= List of METRORail stations =

METRORail is a light rail transit system serving Houston, Texas. The system is operated by the Metropolitan Transit Authority of Harris County, also known as METRO. The system currently has 39 stations and 22.7 miles (36.5 km) of track, served by three lines. METRORail carries 60,600 passengers a day, making it one of the largest light rail systems in the United States in terms of ridership.

METRORail began service on January 1, 2004, with 16 stations from Fannin South station to UH–Downtown station. The line was extended north to the Northline Transit Center/HCC with 8 new stations on December 21, 2013, as part of the North/Red Line Extension. 13 stations were added on May 23, 2015, with the opening of the Green and Purple lines. The two lines intersect with the Red Line at the new Central Station, which had partially opened on February 18, 2015 for Red Line trains. Two additional stations on the Green Line were opened on January 11, 2017, extending the line to the Magnolia Park Transit Center. METRO has also proposed to add 26 more stations on the University and Uptown lines in western Houston.

Only two METRORail stations have public park and rides, Burnett Transit Center and Fannin South; both lots charge a daily rate of $3.

== Stations ==
†	Terminal stations
*	Transfer stations
Transit center	Transit centers

Station	Line(s)	Location	Opened
Altic/Howard Hughes	Green	Second Ward, Houston	May 23, 2015
Bell	Red	Downtown Houston	January 1, 2004
Burnett Transit Center/Casa de Amigos	Red	Downtown Houston	December 21, 2013
Cavalcade	Red	Near Northside, Houston	December 21, 2013
Central Stations *	Green; Purple; Red	Downtown Houston	February 18, 2015
MSG Joe E. Ramirez	Green	Magnolia Park, Houston	January 11, 2017
Coffee Plant/Second Ward	Green	Second Ward, Houston	May 23, 2015
Convention District	Green; Purple	Downtown Houston	May 23, 2015
Downtown Transit Center	Red	Downtown Houston	January 1, 2004
Dryden/TMC	Red	Medical Center, Houston	January 1, 2004
EaDo/Stadium *	Green; Purple	East Downtown Houston	May 23, 2015
Elgin/Third Ward	Purple	Third Ward, Houston	May 23, 2015
Ensemble/HCC	Red	Midtown, Houston	January 1, 2004
Fannin South †	Red	Southeast Houston	January 1, 2004
Fulton/North Central	Red	Near Northside, Houston	December 21, 2013
Hermann Park/Rice University	Red	Houston Museum District	January 1, 2004
Leeland/Third Ward	Purple	East Downtown Houston	May 23, 2015
Lindale Park	Red	Northside, Houston	December 21, 2013
Lockwood/Eastwood	Green	Second Ward, Houston	May 23, 2015
MacGregor Park/Martin Luther King Jr.	Purple	Southeast Houston	May 23, 2015
Magnolia Park Transit Center †	Green	Magnolia Park, Houston	January 11, 2017
Main Street Square	Red	Downtown Houston	January 1, 2004
McGowen	Red	Midtown, Houston	January 1, 2004
Melbourne/North Lindale	Red	Northside, Houston	December 21, 2013
Memorial Hermann Hospital/Houston Zoo	Red	Medical Center, Houston	January 1, 2004
Moody Park	Red	Near Northside, Houston	December 21, 2013
Museum District	Red	Houston Museum District	January 1, 2004
Northline Transit Center/HCC †	Red	Northside, Houston	December 21, 2013
Palm Center Transit Center †	Purple	Southeast Houston	May 23, 2015
Preston	Red	Downtown Houston	January 1, 2004
Quitman/Near Northside	Red	Near Northside, Houston	December 21, 2013
Smith Lands	Red	Medical Center, Houston	January 1, 2004
Stadium Park/Astrodome	Red	NRG Park, Houston	January 1, 2004
Texas Medical Center Transit Center	Red	Medical Center, Houston	January 1, 2004
Theater District †	Green; Purple	Houston Theater District	May 23, 2015
TSU/UH Athletics District	Purple	Third Ward, Houston	May 23, 2015
UH South/University Oaks	Purple	Third Ward, Houston	May 23, 2015
UH–Downtown	Red	Downtown Houston	January 1, 2004
Wheeler	Red	Midtown, Houston	January 1, 2004

== Planned and proposed stations ==
In addition to the 26 stations listed below, three existing stations will be made into transfer stations with the University Line: Wheeler station on the Red Line, and the Robertson Stadium/UH/TSU and Elgin/Third Ward on the Purple Line.

†	Terminal stations
*	Transfer stations
Transit center	Transit centers

Station	Line(s)	Location
Almeda	University	Houston Museum District
Ambassador Way	Uptown	Uptown Houston
Bellaire *	University; Uptown	Bellaire
Cullen	University	Third Ward, Houston
Cummins	University	Upper Kirby, Houston
Eastwood Transit Center †	University	Eastwood, Houston
Edloe	University	Upper Kirby, Houston
Four Oaks	Uptown	Uptown Houston
Gulfton	University	Gulfton, Houston
Hillcroft Transit Center †	University	Sharpstown, Houston
Hutchins	University	Third Ward, Houston
Kirby	University	Upper Kirby, Houston
Memorial	Uptown	Memorial Park, Houston
Menil	University	Montrose, Houston
Montrose	University	Montrose, Houston
Newcastle	University	West University Place
Northwest Transit Center †	Uptown	Spring Branch, Houston
Richmond	Uptown	Uptown Houston
San Felipe	Uptown	Uptown Houston
Shepherd	University	Upper Kirby, Houston
Tierwester	University	Third Ward, Houston
TSU	University	Third Ward, Houston
Uptown Park	Uptown	Uptown Houston
Weslayan	University	West University Place
West Alabama	Uptown	Uptown Houston
Westheimer	Uptown	Uptown Houston
