= EaDo/Stadium station =

Light rail station in Houston, Texas, US

EaDo/Stadium

General information
- Location: Texas Avenue and Dowling Street; Houston, Texas
- Coordinates: 29°45′12.8″N 95°21′07.1″W
- Owner: METRO
- Lines: Green Line; Purple Line
- Platforms: 1 island platform
- Tracks: 2

Construction
- Structure type: Surface
- Accessible: yes

History
- Opened: May 23, 2015

Services
| Preceding station | METRORail | Following station |
|---|---|---|
| Convention District toward Theater District | Green Line | Coffee Plant/Second Ward toward Magnolia Park Transit Center |
| Convention District toward Theater District | Purple Line | Leeland/Third Ward toward Palm Center Transit Center |
Location

EaDo/Stadium is a light rail station in Houston, Texas on the METRORail system. It is served by the Green and Purple lines. The station is named for the East Downtown Houston (EaDo) neighborhood as well as Shell Energy Stadium, which the station serves. Shell Energy Stadium is home to the Houston Dynamo of Major League Soccer and Houston Dash of the National Women's Soccer League.

EaDo/Stadium station opened on May 23, 2015, as part of the first phase of the Green Line.
