= Convention District station =

Light rail station in Houston, Texas, US

Convention District

General information
- Location: Eastbound: 1635 Rusk Street; Westbound: 1700 Capitol Street; Houston, Texas
- Coordinates: 29°45′17.7″N 95°21′25.1″W
- Owner: Metropolitan Transit Authority of Harris County
- Lines: Green Line; Purple Line
- Platforms: 2 side platforms
- Tracks: 2
- Connections: METRO: 500

Construction
- Structure type: At-grade
- Accessible: yes

History
- Opened: May 23, 2015

Passengers
- May 2025: Green Line: 246 (avg. weekday); Purple Line: 218 (avg. weekday)

Services
Preceding station	METRORail	Following station
Central Station toward Theater District	Green Line	EaDo/Stadium toward Magnolia Park Transit Center
Central Station toward Theater District	Purple Line	EaDo/Stadium toward Palm Center Transit Center
Location

Convention District is a METRORail light rail station in Downtown Houston, Texas. It is served by the Green and Purple lines and consists of two side platforms (eastbound on Rusk Street, westbound on Capitol Street) on opposite sides of Avenida De Las Americas.

The station serves the George R. Brown Convention Center and Daikin Park, the home venue of the Houston Astros MLB team. In addition, METRO operates the IAH Downtown Direct shuttle (route 500) to George Bush Intercontinental Airport from the Avenida North parking garage next to the station.

As of May 2025, Convention District has the lowest weekday ridership of all Green Line and Purple Line stations, with an average of 246 riders on the former and 218 riders on the latter.

The station opened with the Green and Purple Lines on May 23, 2015.
