= Palm Center (Houston) =

Services complex in Houston

Coordinates: 29.6960°N 95.3346°W

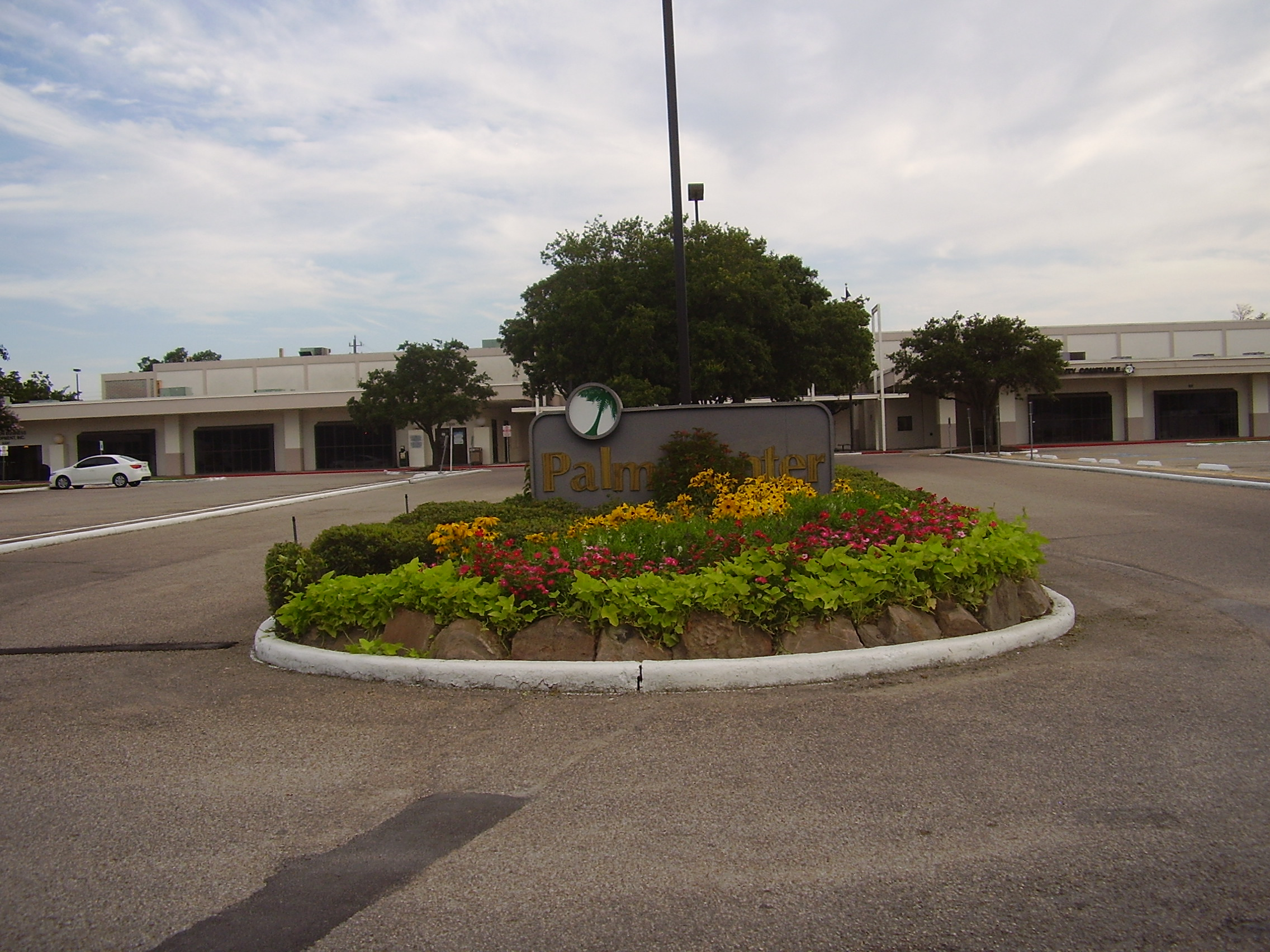
Palm Center entrance

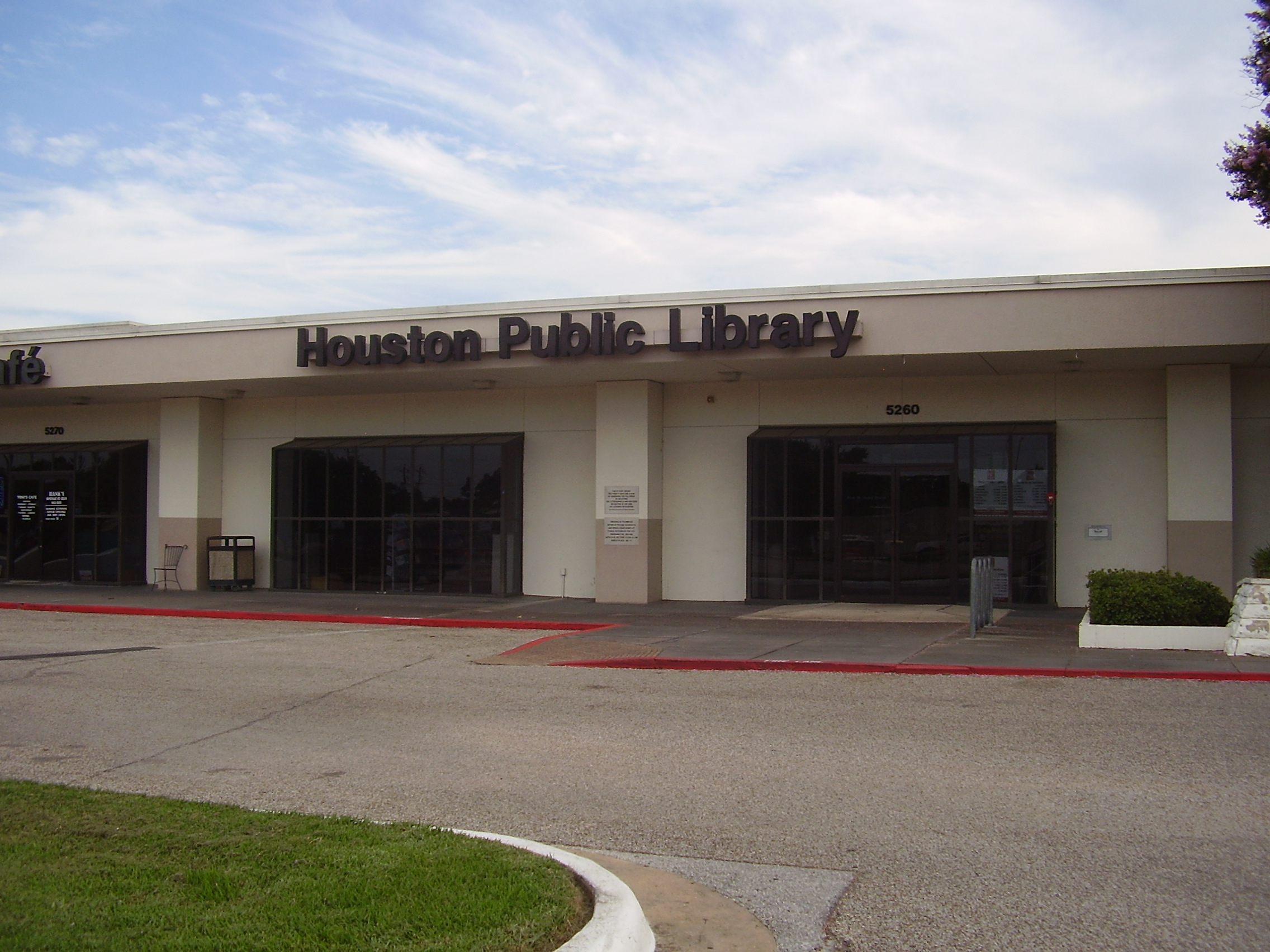
Alice McKean Young Neighborhood Library

The Palm Center Business and Technology Center, commonly known as Palm Center, is a municipally owned services complex in southeast Houston, Texas. It is 6 miles (9.7 km) from NRG Stadium and is in proximity to the Third Ward area.

As of 2011 the 26-acre (11 ha) complex includes a 268,000 square feet (24,900 m^{2}) former shopping center, which is one story tall, and the Park at Palm Center (PAPC). The complex is at the intersection of Martin Luther King Boulevard and Griggs Road. Tenants include small businesses, government agencies, and nonprofits.

== History ==
=== Shopping center ===
It opened as the Palms Center in September 1955. Keiji Asakura, an architect, described it as "the first of its kind that we know today as a shopping center, which means you drive up park and shop." Oscar Holcombe and Sterling T. Hogan Sr. had the shopping center built to serve White Houstonians living in newly developed neighborhoods in Southeast Houston that were not in proximity to the shopping places in Downtown Houston. Irving R. Klein & Associates had designed the center, Stanley Krenek and James Bishop served as the project architects, and Fisher Construction Company completed the structural framework; Holcombe and Hogan had selected Klein & Associates in 1954. The construction of Palm Center started after that of Gulfgate Mall, but Palm Center opened first. Hogan stated that market surveys at the time stated that the Griggs and South Park Boulevard area would have immense growth, so the developers chose this location.

At the time of opening there were 41 stores and 2,000 parking spots. Albert Thomas, a member of the U.S. House of Representatives, cut the ribbon to the facility. J.C. Penney, Oshman's, Walgreens, and Woolworth had stores at the time of opening. The library had opened around that time.

Collins Tuttle & Co., a real estate company headquartered in New York, purchased Palm Center from Holcombe and Hogan. In 1969 Helmsley-Spear acquired Palm Center.

The white neighborhoods quickly became majority black due to white flight in the 1970s. The neighborhoods' rapid changes harmed area retail businesses. Prior to the 1980s many tenants left Palms Center. J. R. Gonzales of the Houston Chronicle wrote "the center resembled a ghost town by the early 1980s." The J.C. Penney, the final tenant, closed in 1984.

=== City-owned complex ===
In the mid-1980s the City of Houston acquired the complex. In 1987 the city began to redevelop Palm Center to attract small businesses as part of the Target of Opportunity program, funded by loans made by the federal government. The Palms Center Management Company and the Tillman Trotter Foundation cooperated with the city government in this endeavor. The small business center opened in 1989. The city government engaged in a memorandum of understanding with the Houston Business Development, Inc. (HBDi), an entity created by the city government several years prior, in 1992, so that it would handle the redevelopment and management of the complex. That year the Department of Housing and Urban Development (HUD) stated that the Houston redevelopment program had over-reported the number of jobs created and not accurately report spending; the HUD stated in a report that the city overpaid the private development team that renovated Palm Center $1 million and that there was $800,000 in other unnecessary expenses. The city paid $572,000 in punitive costs to the HUD. The center received its current name in 1993, and that year HBDi began managing Palm Center.

The HUD approved the construction of a building for light manufacturing and the use of the community development funds for renovation of 12,000-square-foot (1,100 m^{2}) of space. There were 10 offices for start-up businesses and 25 other offices for prospective tenants available by July 1994. By 1996 the organization in the Palm Center complex was the nonprofit management organization in charge of it, HSBDC. By that year, the city had only attracted three additional tenants.

Carroll Parrott Blue, a research professor at the University of Houston, applied for a grant from the National Endowment for the Arts (NEA) to improve the center; she did so on behalf of the university's Third Ward Arts Initiative. The NEA gave a $100,000 grant, scheduled to be spent at the new park at Palm Center. The university consulted 64-year-old Paulette Wagner, the president of the MacGregor Trails Civic Club in the Riverside Terrace community, for ideas on what to do.

In the fall of 2012 a solar-powered kitchen was to be installed in the Palm Center Park. It was designed by UH architecture and graphics communications students.

Since 2015, METRORail light rail has served the Palm Center area with a station at the Palm Center Transit Center on the Purple Line.

== Tenants ==
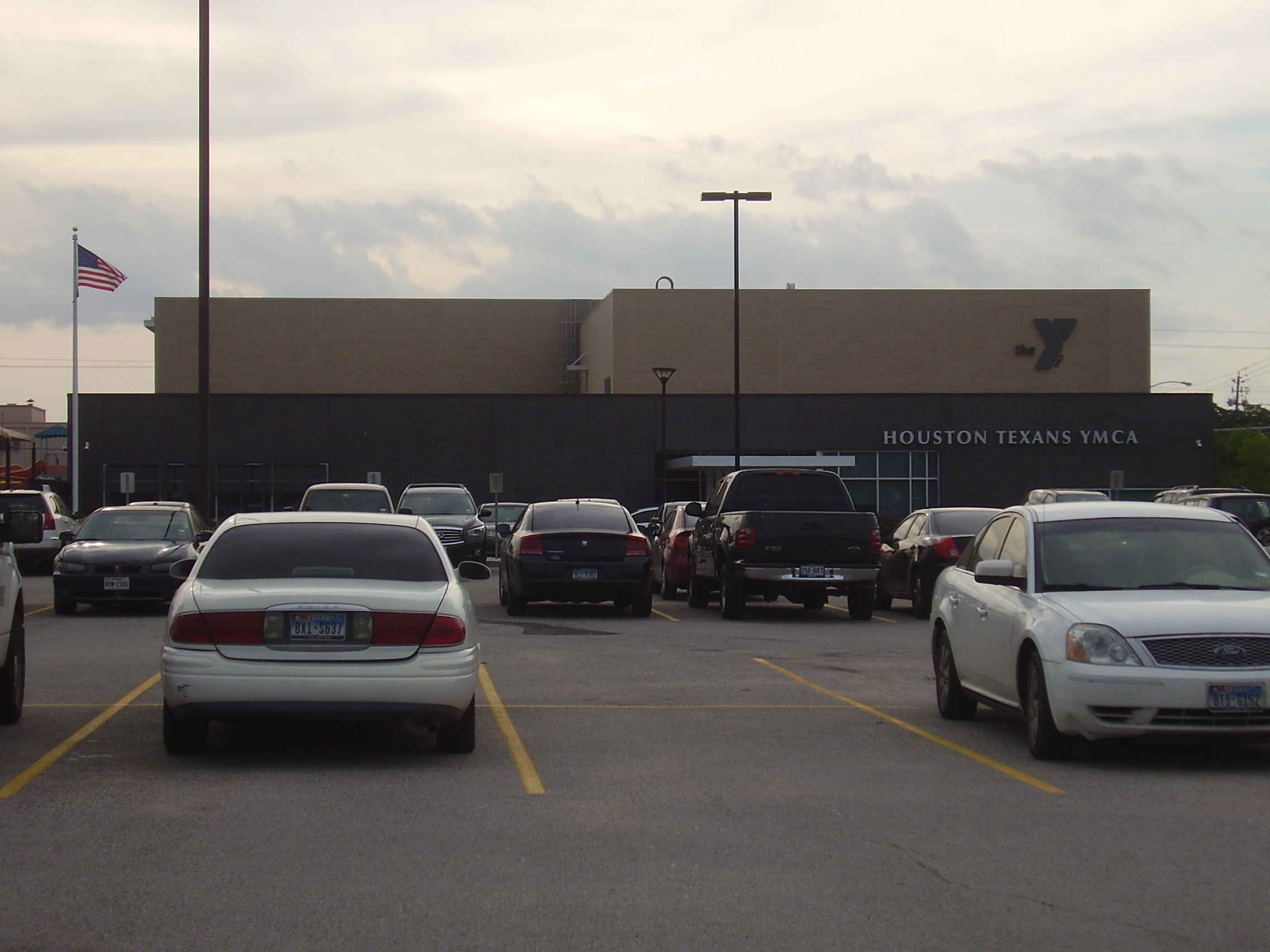
Houston Texans YMCA

The Alice McKean Young Neighborhood Library of the Houston Public Library is within Palm Center. The groundbreaking for the new Young Library building was held on Friday December 19, 2014.

The Harris Health System Dental Center is in Palm Center.

Harris County Constable Precinct 7 has its offices in Palm Center. A branch of the Harris County Tax Office is in the same complex.

There is a U.S. post office and an office of Neighborhood Centers, Inc. within Palm Center.

The Houston Business Development, Inc. (HBD) and the Business Information Center (BIC) are in Palm Center.

Over 40 small businesses are in the complex.

The Houston Texans YMCA was built on 5-acre (2.0 ha) of land, on the site of a previous building that had been abandoned; this building had the original Palms Center sign. The YMCA announced plans to open the new Texans YMCA, which replaced the South Central YMCA, on March 25, 2008. Groundbreaking occurred in December 2008. The opening of the facility, the United States's first YMCA named after an athletic team, was scheduled for January 3, 2011.

Previously Kelsey-Seybold operated the Palm Center clinic at 5290 Griggs. In April 2003 Kelsey-Seybold announced it was closing. The doctors moved to the Kelsey-Seybold main campus.
