= Elgin/Third Ward station =

Light rail station in Houston, Texas, US

Elgin/Third Ward
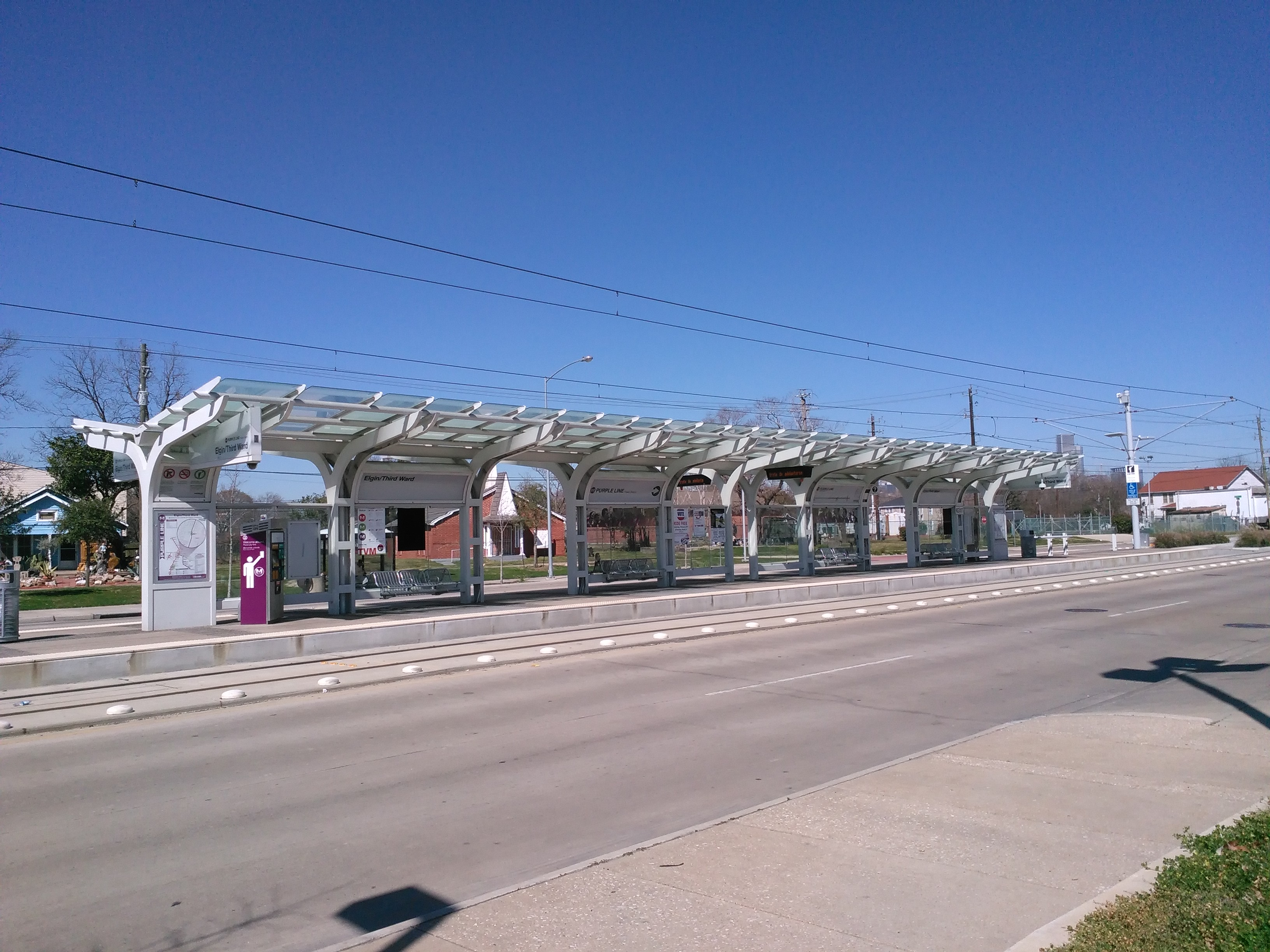
- Station platform, February 2016

General information
- Location: Scott Street & Elgin Street; Houston, Texas
- Coordinates: 29°43′42.2″N 95°20′59.6″W
- Owner: METRO
- Line: Purple Line
- Platforms: 1 island platform
- Tracks: 2

Construction
- Structure type: Surface
- Accessible: yes

History
- Opened: May 23, 2015

Services
Preceding station	METRORail	Following station
Leeland/Third Ward toward Theater District	Purple Line	TSU/UH Athletics District toward Palm Center Transit Center

Proposed services (2030)
Preceding station	METRORapid	Following station
TSU/UH Athletics District toward Westchase Park and Ride	University Line Proposed	Cullen toward Tidwood Transit Center
Location

Elgin/Third Ward is a light rail station in Houston, Texas on the METRORail system. It is served by the Purple Line and is located on Scott Street at Elgin Street in the Third Ward.

Elgin/Third Ward station opened on May 23, 2015.

The station is proposed as a transfer station for the University Line.
