= Leeland/Third Ward station =

Light rail station in Houston, Texas, US

Leeland/Third Ward
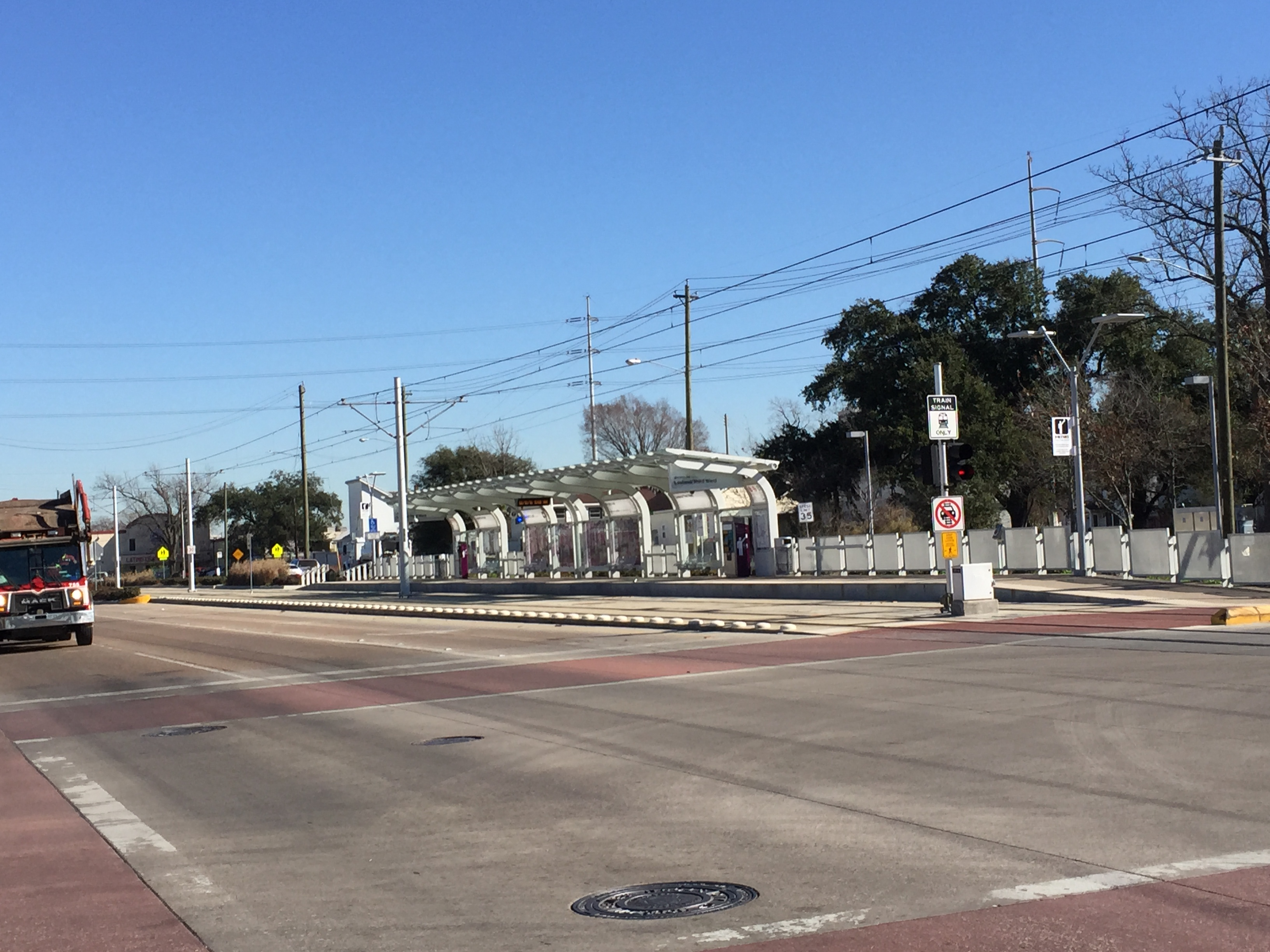

General information
- Location: Scott Street & Leeland Street; Houston, Texas
- Coordinates: 29°44′21.3″N 95°20′44.9″W
- Owner: METRO
- Line: Purple Line
- Platforms: 2 side platforms
- Tracks: 2

Construction
- Structure type: Surface
- Accessible: yes

History
- Opened: May 23, 2015

Services
Preceding station	METRORail	Following station
EaDo/Stadium toward Theater District	Purple Line	Elgin/Third Ward toward Palm Center Transit Center
Location

Leeland/Third Ward is a light rail station in Houston, Texas, on the METRORail system. It is served by the Purple Line and is located on Scott Street at Leeland Street in East Downtown, across Interstate 45 from the Third Ward.

Leeland/Third Ward station opened on May 23, 2015.
