= TSU/UH Athletics District station =

Light station in Houston, Texas

TSU/UH Athletics District

General information
- Location: Scott Street & E Alabama Avenue; Houston, Texas
- Coordinates: 29°43′19.4″N 95°21′04.9″W
- Owner: METRO
- Line: Purple Line
- Platforms: 2 island platforms
- Tracks: 3

Construction
- Structure type: Surface
- Accessible: yes

History
- Opened: May 23, 2015

Services
Preceding station	METRORail	Following station
Elgin/Third Ward toward Theater District	Purple Line	UH South/University Oaks toward Palm Center Transit Center

Proposed services (2030)
Preceding station	METRORapid	Following station
Tierwester toward Westchase Park and Ride	University Line Proposed	Elgin/Third Ward toward Tidwood Transit Center
Location

TSU/UH Athletics District is a light rail station in Houston, Texas on the METRORail system. It is served by the Purple Line and is located on Scott Street near Alabama Avenue. The station is named for the University of Houston, Texas Southern University, and the TDECU Stadium. The station serves both universities.

Robertson Stadium/UH/TSU station opened on May 23, 2015. It was renamed from Robertson Stadium/UH/TSU to TSU/UH Athletics District in August 2017, after Metro received a request from the University of Houston.

The station is proposed as a transfer station for the University Line.
