= UH South/University Oaks station =

Light rail station in Houston, Texas

UH South/University Oaks
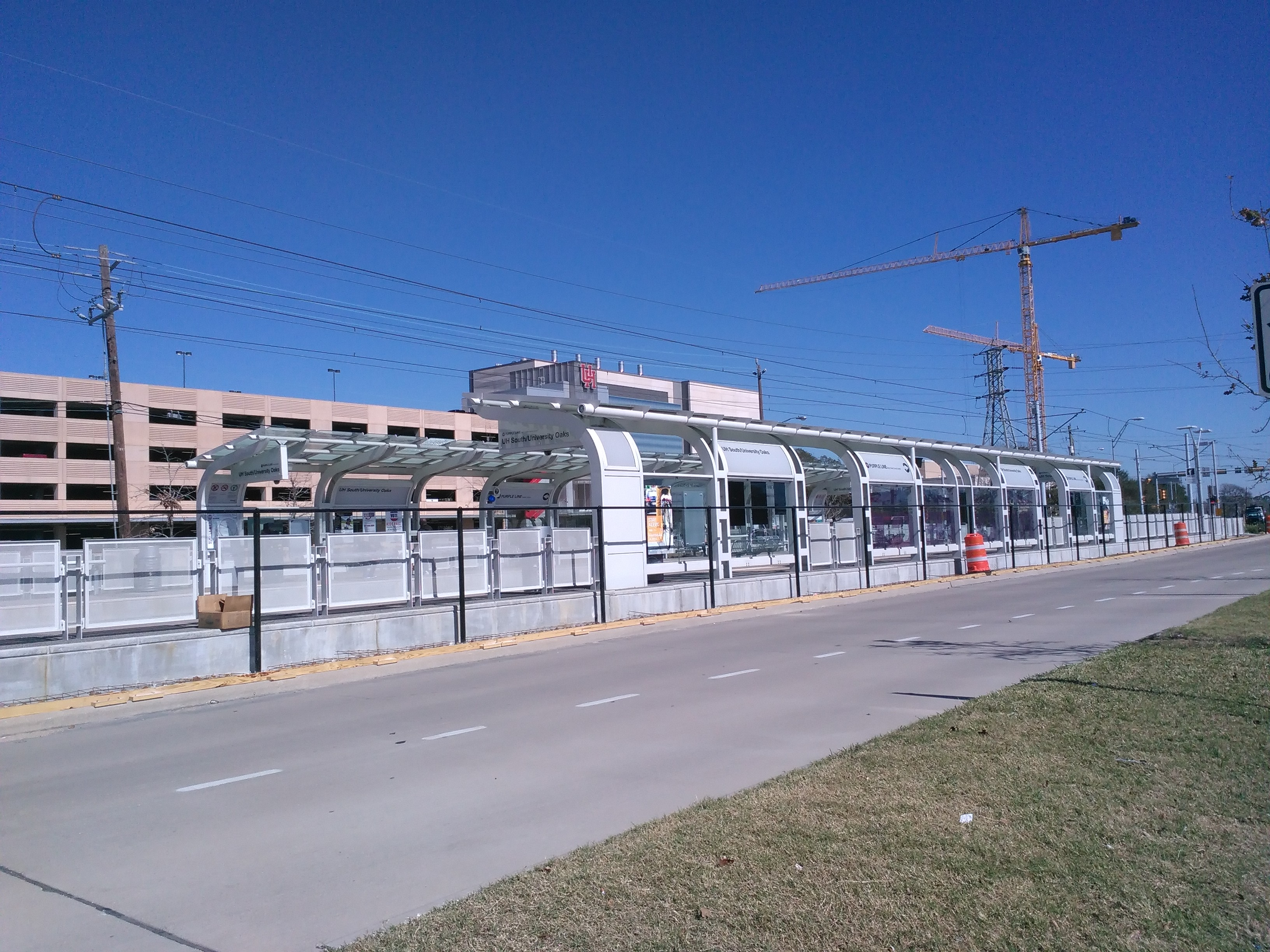

General information
- Location: 4455 Wheeler Ave. Houston, Texas
- Coordinates: 29°42′58.0″N 95°20′28.2″W
- Owner: Metropolitan Transit Authority of Harris County
- Line: Purple Line
- Platforms: 2 side platforms
- Tracks: 2
- Connections: METRO: 25, 80

Construction
- Structure type: At-grade
- Accessible: yes

History
- Opened: May 23, 2015

Passengers
- May 2025: 318 (avg. weekday)

Services
Preceding station	METRORail	Following station
TSU/UH Athletics District toward Theater District	Purple Line	MacGregor Park/Martin Luther King Jr. toward Palm Center Transit Center
Location

UH South/University Oaks is a METRORail light rail station in the University Oaks neighborhood of Houston, Texas. The station is served by the Purple Line and is located north of Wheeler Avenue on the south side of the University of Houston campus.

As of May 2025, UH South/University Oaks has the lowest weekend ridership of all Purple Line stations, with an average of 165 riders on Saturdays and 154 riders on Sundays.

UH South/University Oaks station opened on May 23, 2015.
