= List of Metro Rail stations =

List of Metro Rail stations may refer to:

- List of Buffalo Metro Rail stations
- List of METRORail stations
- List of Los Angeles Metro Rail stations
