= Coffee Plant/Second Ward station =

Light rail station in Houston, Texas, US

Coffee Plant/Second Ward
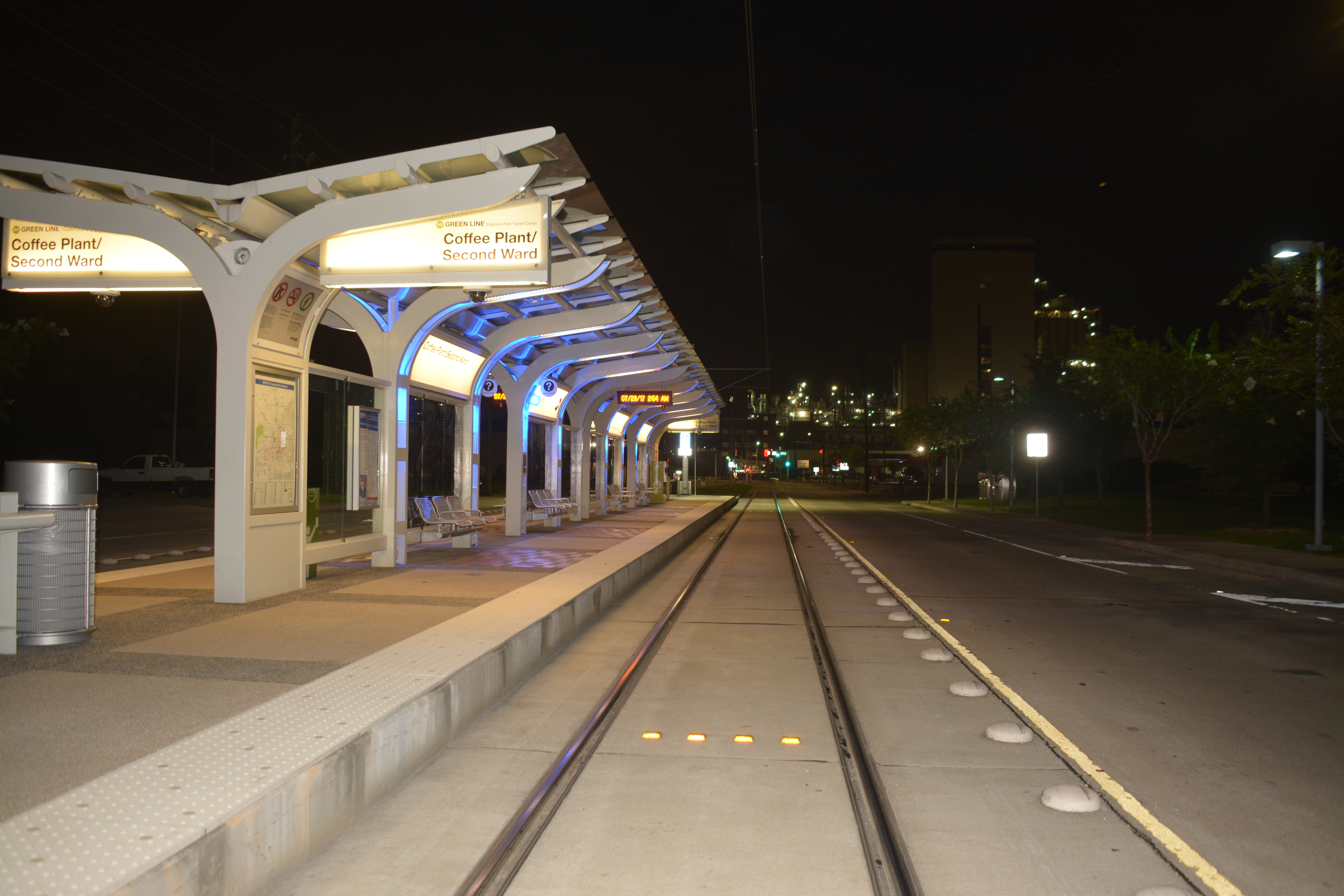
- Coffee Plant Second Ward Rail station from the west part of the platform.

General information
- Location: Harrisburg Blvd and York Street; Houston, Texas
- Coordinates: 29°44′51.2″N 95°20′24.5″W
- Owner: METRO
- Line: Green Line
- Platforms: 1 island platform
- Tracks: 2

Construction
- Structure type: Surface
- Accessible: yes

History
- Opened: May 23, 2015

Services
Preceding station	METRORail	Following station
EaDo/Stadium toward Theater District	Green Line	Lockwood/Eastwood toward Magnolia Park Transit Center
Location

Coffee Plant/Second Ward is a light rail station in Houston, Texas on the METRORail system. It is served by the Green Line and is located on Harrisburg Boulevard between York and Hutcheson streets. The station is named for the Second Ward neighborhood as well as a former Maxwell House coffee manufacturing plant. Maxwell House began operations at the plant in 1948 and sold the plant to Maximus Coffee Group in 2006, which operated the plant under the Atlantic Coffee Solutions brand until 2018.

Coffee Plant/Second Ward station opened on May 23, 2015, as part of the Green Line's first phase.
