= Central Station (Houston) =

Light rail station in Houston, Texas, US

Coordinates: 29°45′31.79″N 95°21′48.41″W

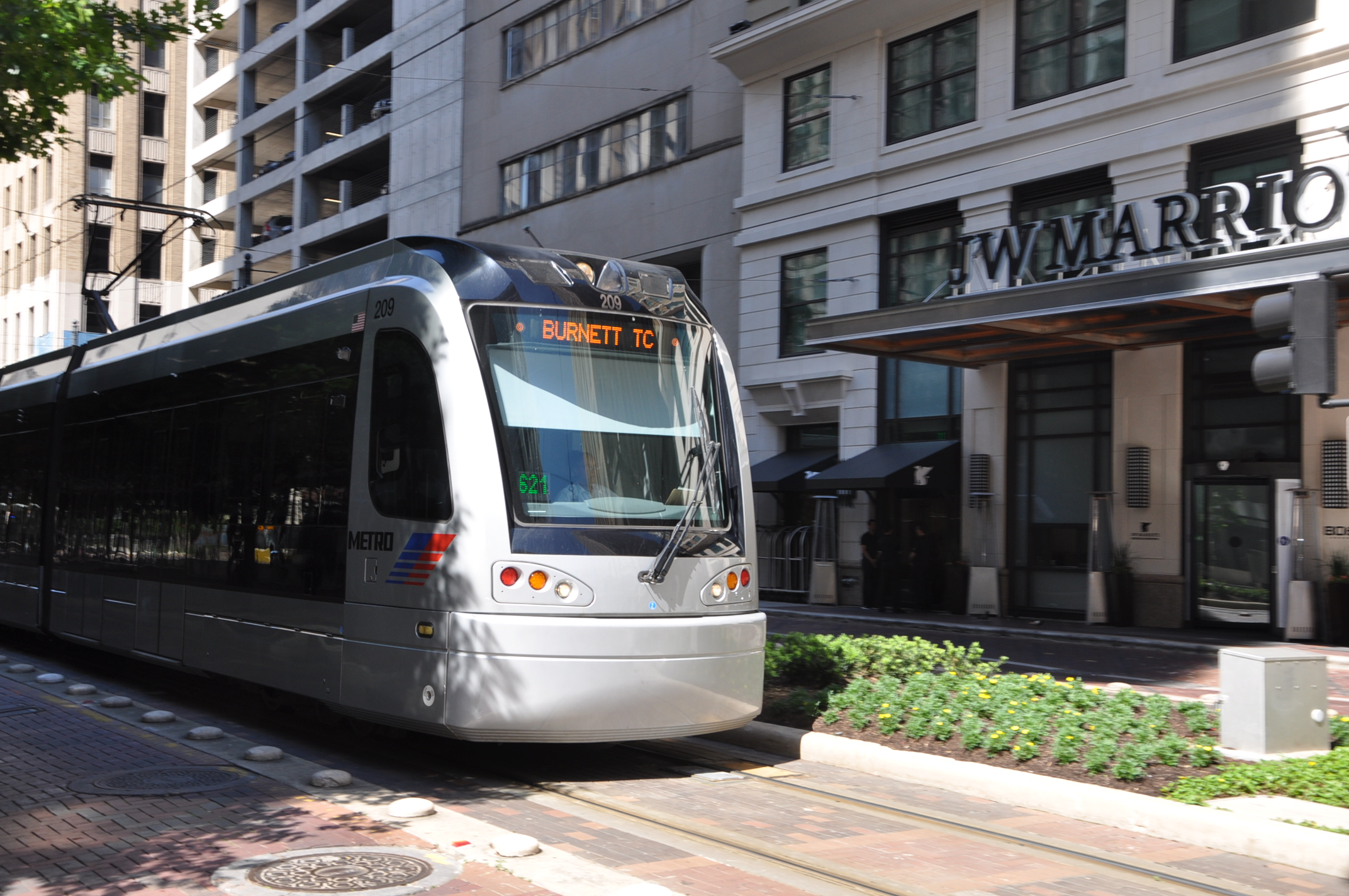
- Northbound Red Line train at Central Station

General information
- Location: Main: 714 Main Street; Capitol: 1120 Capitol Street; Rusk: 1110 Rusk Street; Houston, Texas
- Owner: Metropolitan Transit Authority of Harris County
- Lines: Red Line; Green Line; Purple Line
- Platforms: Main: 1 island platform Capitol/Rusk: 1 side platform
- Tracks: Main: 2 Capitol/Rusk: 1
- Connections: METRO: 6, 11, 51, 52, 82, 102, 108, 137; METRO Park & Ride: 202, 204, 209, 212, 236, 244, 247, 249, 255, 257, 259; METRO Community Connector: Downtown Zone

Construction
- Structure type: At-grade
- Cycle facilities: Main: 10 spaces
- Accessible: Yes

History
- Opened: Main: February 18, 2015; 11 years ago Capitol/Rusk: May 23, 2015; 11 years ago

Passengers
- May 2025: Red Line: 1,851 (avg. weekday); Green Line: 883 (avg. weekday); Purple Line: 798 (avg. weekday)

Services
Preceding station	METRORail	Following station
Main Street Square toward Fannin South	Red Line	Preston toward Northline Transit Center/HCC
Theater District Terminus	Green Line	Convention District toward Magnolia Park Transit Center
Theater District Terminus	Purple Line	Convention District toward Palm Center Transit Center
Location

Central Station is a METRORail light rail station in downtown Houston, Texas, United States. The station serves as a transfer point between all three METRORail lines: the Red Line, Green Line, and Purple Line. Central is the only Red Line station to connect to another METRORail line.

The station proper consists of three separate platforms. Central Station Capitol, a side platform on Capitol Street, serves westbound Green and Purple Line trains, while Central Station Rusk, a side platform on Rusk Street, serves eastbound Green and Purple Line trains. Central Station Main, an island platform in the median of Main Street, 1 1/2 blocks west of Capitol/Rusk, serves the Red Line.

As of May 2025, Central station has the highest ridership of all Green Line and Purple Line stations.

== History ==
The Red line platform opened on February 18, 2015 as an infill station along the pre-existing rail line. The Green and Purple line platforms opened May 23, 2015.

== Points of interest ==
Destinations located within a short walk of the station include:

- The Downtown Aquarium
- Bayou Place
- Alley Theatre
- The Wortham Theater
- Daikin Park
- Jones Hall
- Club Quarters Hotel
- JW Marriott Downtown Houston
- Bombay Indian Grill
- Cafe Express
- Flying Saucer Draught Emporium
- Springbok
- Sunny's Bar
