= University Oaks, Houston =

Subdivision of Houston, Texas, IS

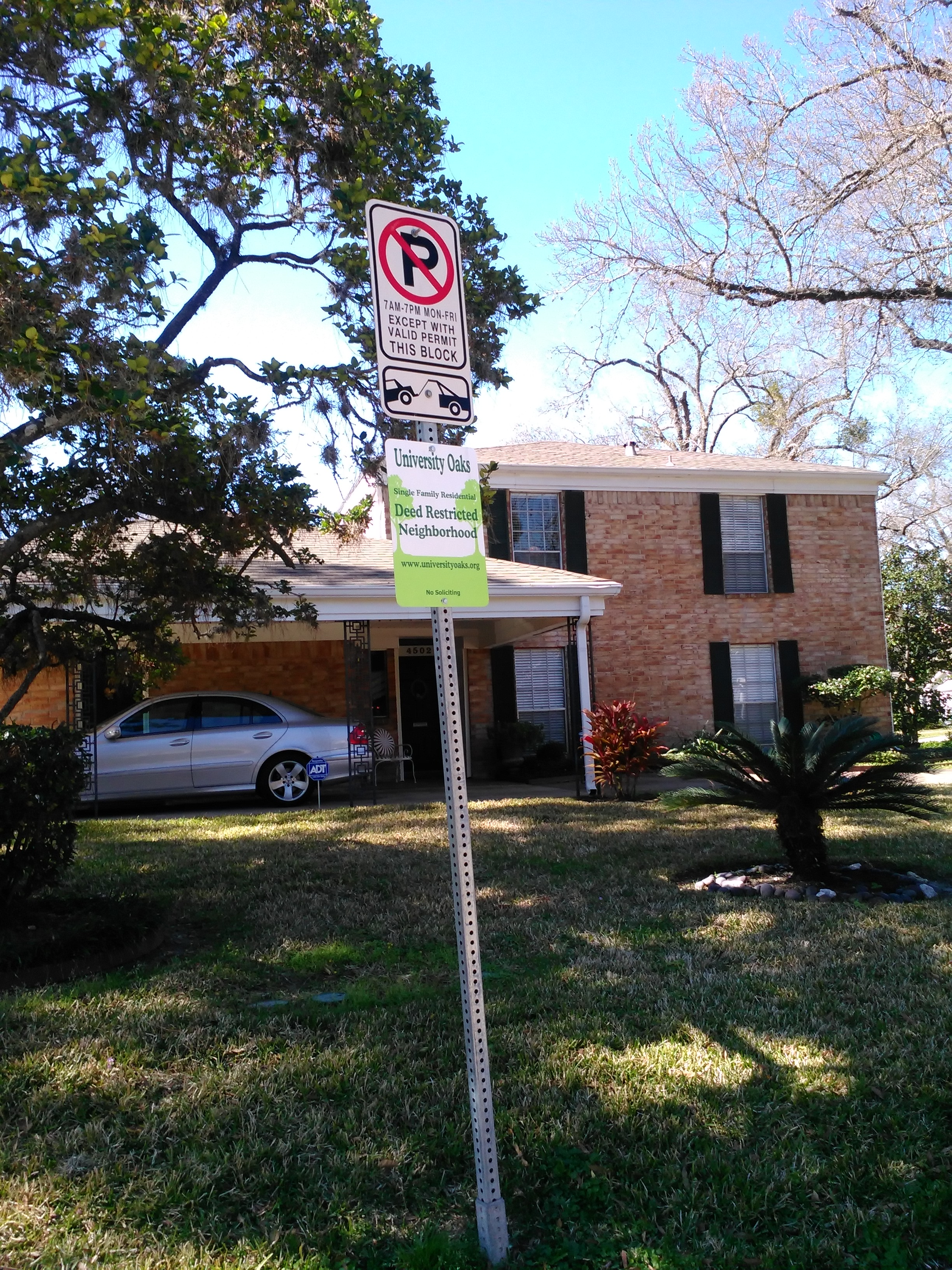
Subdivision sign

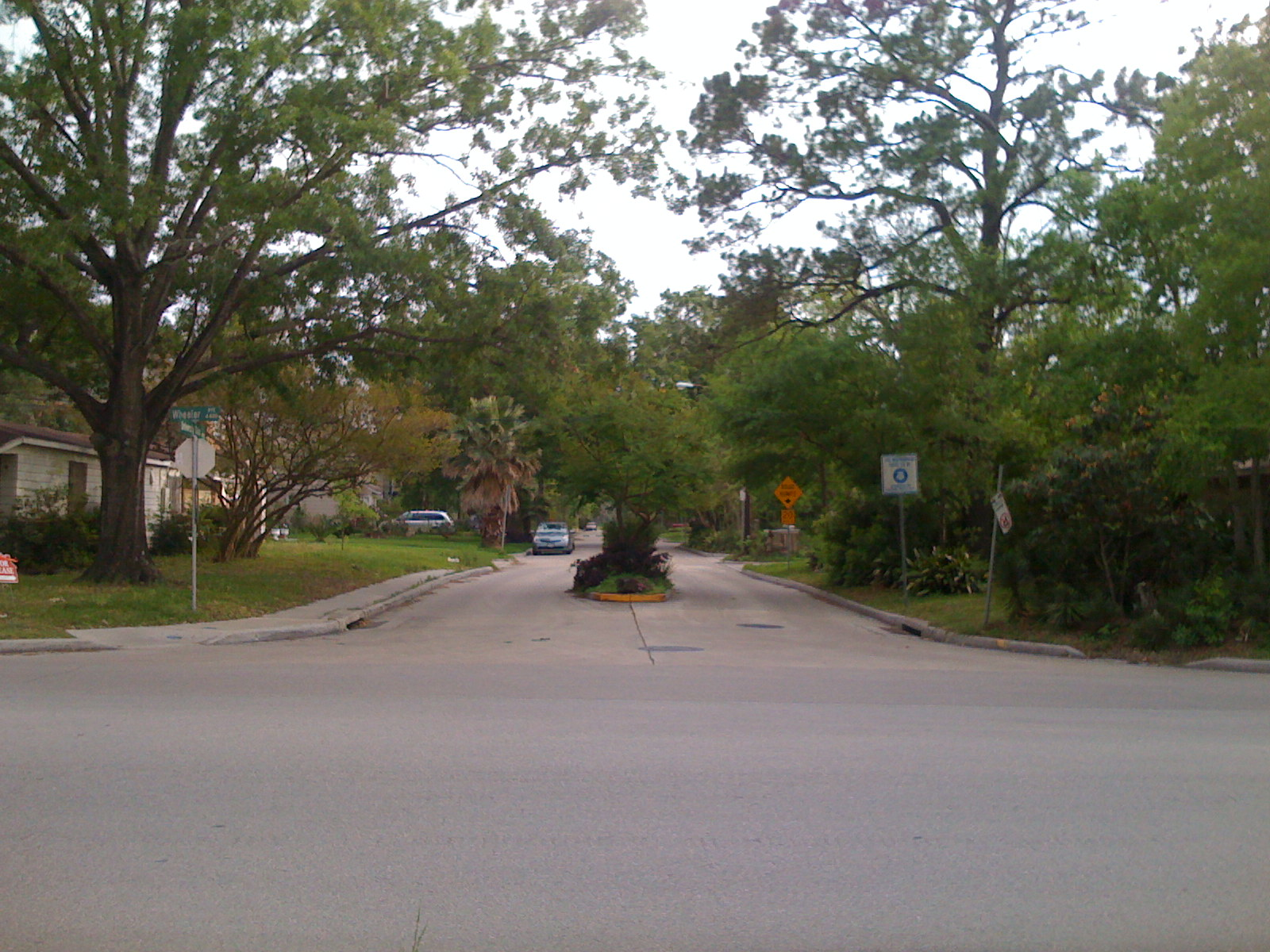
An entrance into University Oaks on Wheeler Avenue

University Oaks is a subdivision in southeast Houston with approximately 240 homes located adjacent to the University of Houston. It is bounded by Wheeler Avenue to the north, South MacGregor Way to the south, Calhoun Road to the east, and Cullen Boulevard to the west.

== History ==
University Oaks was first platted in 1939 and the land that the subdivision occupies was formerly owned by Ben Taub. The original deed included a racial covenant that restricted homeowners from selling or leasing their houses to any groups other than "the Caucasian race." It was last renewed in 1980. In 1984, the homeowners association had over 150 members. During that year the United States Department of Justice sued the subdivision to force it to remove the racial covenant, which was deemed illegal by the 1968 Fair Housing Act. The defendants were John Baust, the civil club president, and Anita Rodeheaver, the Harris County Clerk. In the lawsuit papers, the subdivision argued that deleting the racial covenant would jeopardize the other provisions from the original deed.

In 2006, the University of Houston announced increased development plans—including one to blend low-rise residence halls with the University Oaks subdivision. Doug Erwing, who was at the time the president of the University Oaks Civic Club, announced support for plans to increase retail offerings and added that he would prefer redevelopment that fit with the neighborhood such as lower-rise dormitories as opposed to high rise dormitories.

== Education ==
Houses in the neighborhood are zoned to Houston Independent School District (HISD) schools. The community is within Trustee District IV, represented by Paula M. Harris as of 2009.

Some residents are zoned to Lockhart Elementary School while others are zoned to Peck Elementary School. All residents are zoned to Cullen Middle School and Yates High School.

By spring 2011, HISD planned to consolidate Lockhart and Turner, with a new campus in the Lockhart site. By the same time frame HISD also plans to consolidate Peck and MacArthur elementary schools, with the replacement campus on the Peck site. Residents were previously zoned to Ryan Middle School. In 2013 it closed, with students rezoned to Cullen.

== Government and infrastructure ==
The Harris Health System (formerly Harris County Hospital District) designated the Martin Luther King Health Center in southeast Houston for the ZIP code 77004. The designated public hospital is Ben Taub General Hospital in the Texas Medical Center.

== Transportation ==
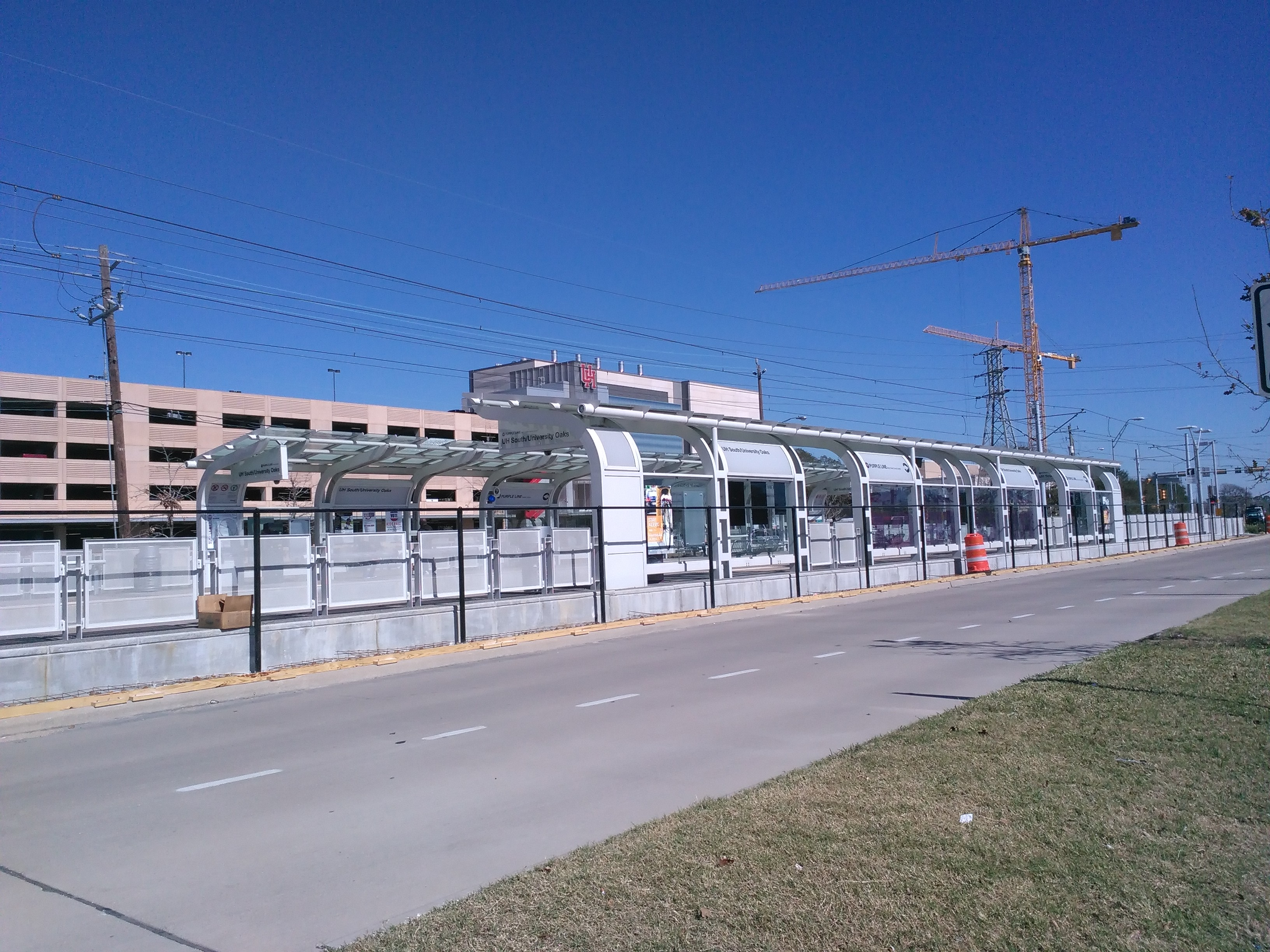
UH South/University Oaks

The METRORail Purple Line UH South/University Oaks railway station serves the neighborhood.

== Notable people ==
- Guy Lewis (1922–2015), basketball player and coach
- Elizabeth Brown-Guillory, academic, playwright and performing artist
- Case Keenum (born 1988), American football player
