= MacGregor Park/Martin Luther King Jr. station =

Light rail station in Houston, Texas, US

MacGregor Park/Martin Luther King Jr.

General information
- Location: Martin Luther King Jr. Blvd. and Old Spanish Trail; Houston, Texas
- Coordinates: 29°42′33.9″N 95°20′11.4″W
- Owner: METRO
- Line: Purple Line
- Platforms: 2 side platforms
- Tracks: 2

Construction
- Structure type: Surface
- Accessible: yes

History
- Opened: May 23, 2015

Services
Preceding station	METRORail	Following station
UH South/University Oaks toward Theater District	Purple Line	Palm Center Transit Center Terminus
Location

MacGregor Park/Martin Luther King Jr. is a light rail station in Houston, Texas on the METRORail system. It is served by the Purple Line, and is located in the median of Martin Luther King Jr. Boulevard at Old Spanish Trail near MacGregor Park.

MacGregor Park/Martin Luther King Jr. station opened on May 23, 2015.
