= MacGregor Park =

Park in Houston, Texas, US

Coordinates: 29.708199°N 95.341593°W

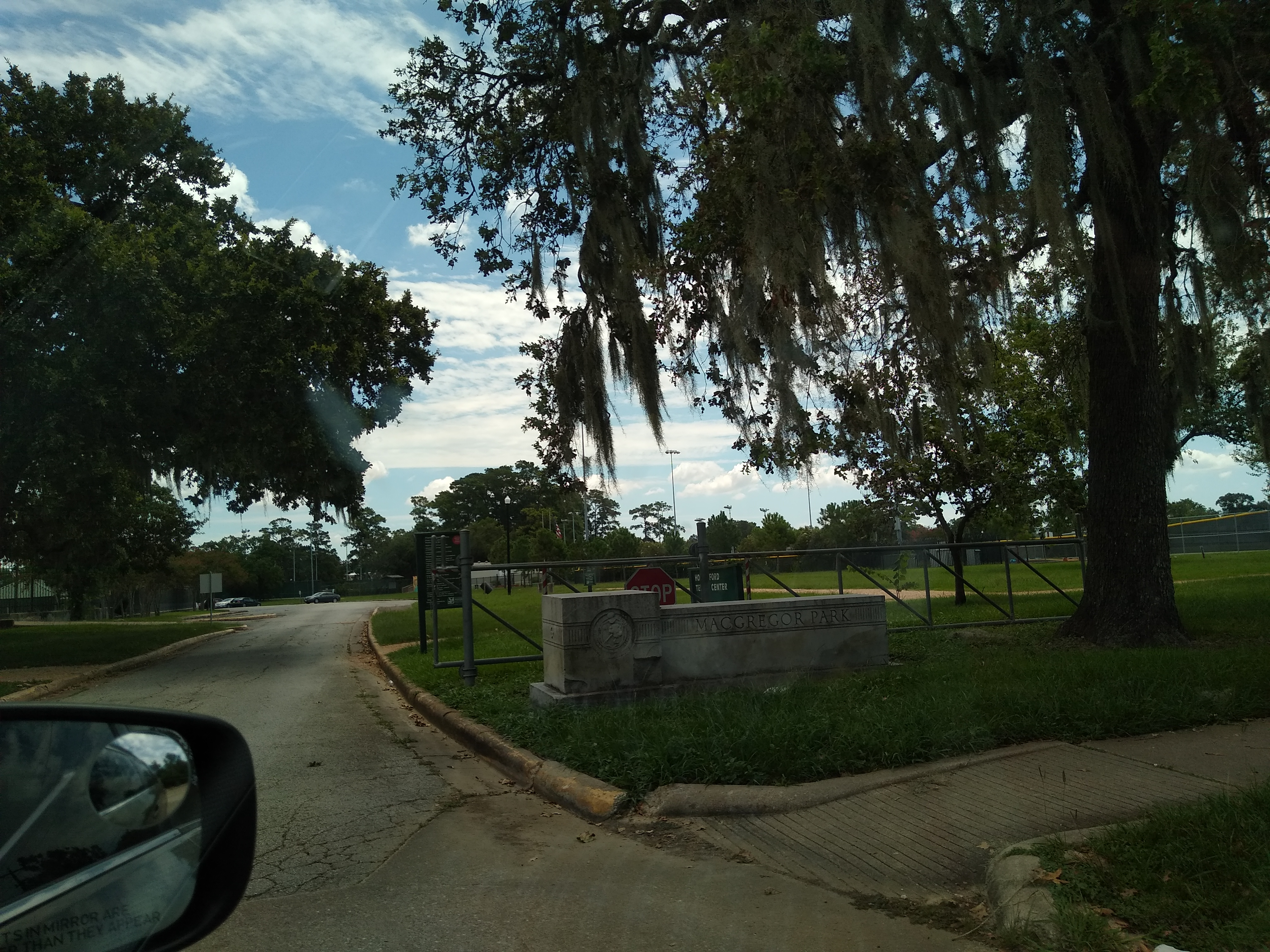
Park entrance

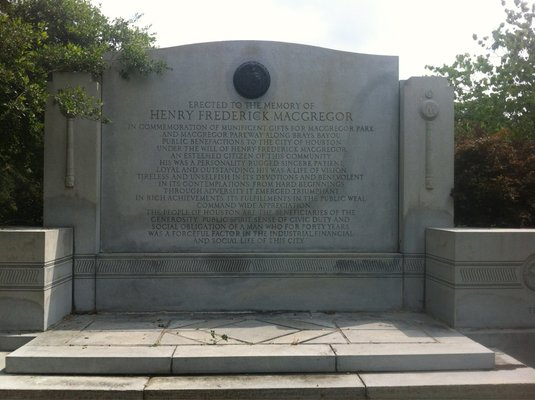
MacGregor Monument at MacGregor Park

MacGregor Park-Neagle Field is a park and baseball venue in the Third Ward, Houston, Texas, and the home field of the Texas Southern Tigers baseball team. The Tigers are a member of the Southwestern Athletic Conference.

A 42-acre section of the park is owned by the University of Houston.

Riverside Terrace is adjacent to the park.

== History ==
It was named after Henry Frederick MacGregor, who was from Derry, New Hampshire, and had ancestry from Northern Ireland.

MacGregor conceptualized a park in the area, with the Brays Bayou being used as a path from Hermann Park to his new park; he died in 1923 before he could see the park completed. His estate gave the city government the money to establish the park, and his widow, Elizabeth "Peggy" MacGregor, donated the land. Will Hogg donated trees to form a World War I memorial, the War Mothers Memorial. The 1926 land survey was done by Howe & Wise, Engineers employee R. O. Bosworth. Hare & Hare developed the park throughout the mid-20th century. The current park has a focus on recreational activities while MacGregor's original vision emphasized it being a space for nature.

Due to demographic changes in the mid-20th century, the surrounding areas became majority African-American. MacGregor Park was a popular gathering spot for African-American youth in the late 1980s and the early 1990s, and they typically pursued recreation on Sundays. The police closed the park temporarily after a 1992 shooting. Andrew Dansby of the Houston Chronicle wrote in 2016 that "Those big Sundays never returned in quite the same way, though MacGregor remained a neighborhood touchstone."

A hip hop show occurred in 2001. Texas Parks and Wildlife Department gave a $1 million grant that resulted in a 2005 renovation. In 2009 the Parks To Standards program of the city government resulted in $600,000 worth of enhancements. A car parade ending at MacGregor, called the SLAB parade, began in 2013.

== Features ==
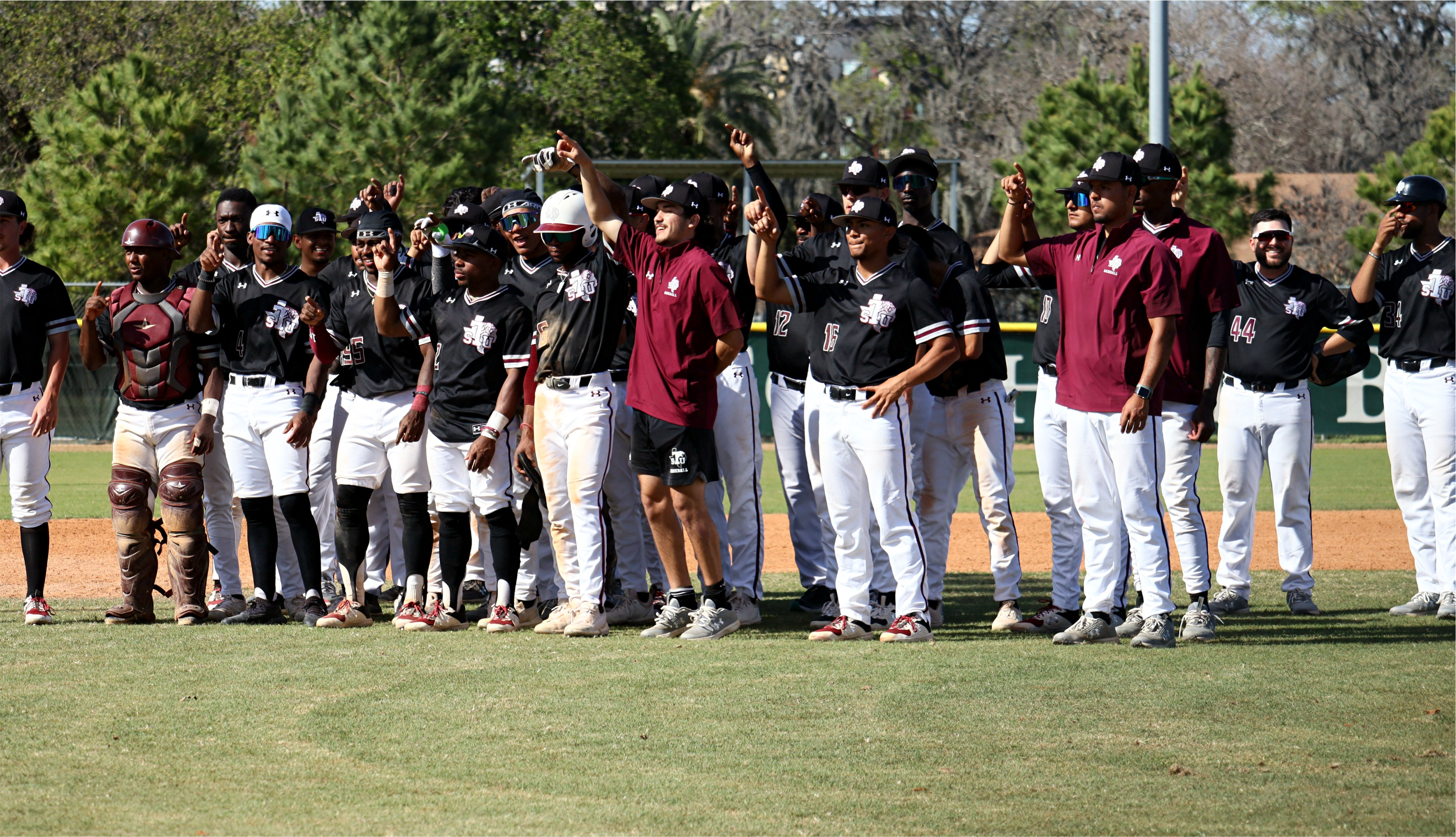
Texas Southern Tigers baseball players salute the crowd gathered at MacGregor Park during a game in 2022.

The park has 82.79 acres (33.50 ha) of land. It has an outdoor basketball court, a disc-style golf course with 18 holes, a hike and bicycle trail that is 1.25 miles (2.01 km) long, a meeting room, a sports field with lighting, a swimming pool, and a weight room.

William Ward Watkin designed a memorial stone for MacGregor, located at the park.

A statue of Peggy MacGregor as a young woman, made by Gutzon Borglum and commissioned by Henry MacGregor, was created in 1927; it was moved to the park and restored by the city government's Municipal Art Commission in 1997.

John Wilkerson established the MacGregor Park Junior Tennis Program.

== Transportation ==
The METRORail station MacGregor Park/Martin Luther King Jr. is in proximity to the park.

== Cultural legacy ==
Andrew Dansby of the Houston Chronicle wrote that due to the park's use by sports figures and in hip-hop culture, "MacGregor Park has a storied place in Houston culture."

Songs about MacGregor Park include the 1985 song "MacGregor Park" with writing attribution to Robert Harlan and by "the L.A. Rapper," as well as the 2015 song "MacGregor Park" by Fat Tony.

== See also ==
- List of NCAA Division I baseball venues
