= Main Street Square station =

Light rail station in Houston, Texas

Coordinates: 29°45′26.64″N 95°21′52.33″W

Main Street Square
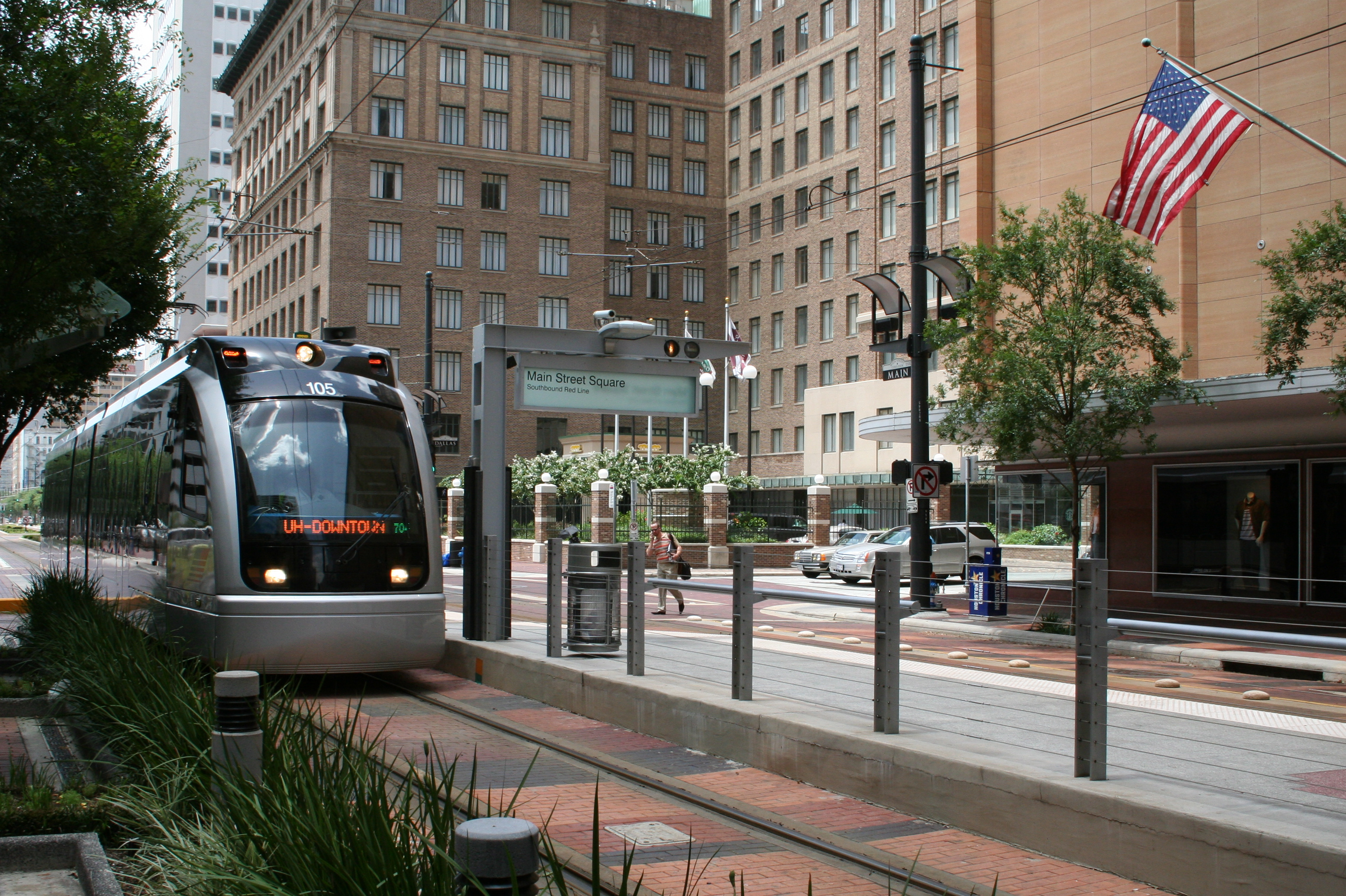

General information
- Location: Main Street; Between Walker & McKinney and Lamar & Dallas
- Owner: METRO
- Line: Red Line
- Platforms: Split Island
- Tracks: Two
- Connections: METRO Community Connector: Downtown Zone

Construction
- Parking: Not available
- Cycle facilities: Adjacent sidewalk racks, Bicycles allowed on train during off peak times (Weekdays: 9am-3pm & 8pm-Close; Weekends: All Times).
- Accessible: Yes

History
- Opened: January 1, 2004; 22 years ago

Services
Preceding station	METRORail	Following station
Bell toward Fannin South	Red Line	Central Station toward Northline Transit Center/HCC
Location

Main Street Square is a station on the METRORail Red Line in Houston, Texas (USA). This originally was the 3rd station heading south along the rail line and is in the heart of downtown. There are many shopping areas and offices nearby. The station is located on Main Street in Downtown Houston and has two separate platforms. The northbound platform is located between Walker and McKinney Streets, while the southbound platform is located between Lamar and Dallas Streets. These two platforms are divided by the Main Street Square fountain.

== Points of interest ==
Attractions located within a short walk of the station include Houston City Hall, the main branch of the Houston Public Library, Discovery Green, Toyota Center, George R. Brown Convention Center and the Hobby Center for the Performing Arts.

== Bus connections ==
All of these routes connect at or nearby both of the station platforms.

LOCAL: 6 Jensen/Greens, 11 Almeda/Lyons, 32 Renwick/San Felipe, 40 Telephone/Heights/Hobby Airport, 41 Kirby/Polk, 44 Acres Homes, 51 Hardy/Kelley, 52 Hardy/Ley, 82 Westheimer, 85 Antoine/Washington.

LIMITED: 102 Bush IAH Express, 108 Veterans Memorial Express, 137 Northshore Express, 160 Memorial City Express, 161 Wilcrest Express, 162 Memorial Express.

COMMUTER: 202 Kuykendahl, 204 Spring, 209 North Corridor Combined, 212 Seton Lake, 221 Kingsland, 244 Monroe, 246 Bay Area, 247 Fuqua, 249 Gulf Corridor Combined, 255 Kingwood, 256 Eastex, 257 Townsen, 259 Eastex Corridor Combined, 262 Westwood, 265 West Bellfort, 269 Southwest Corridor Combined.

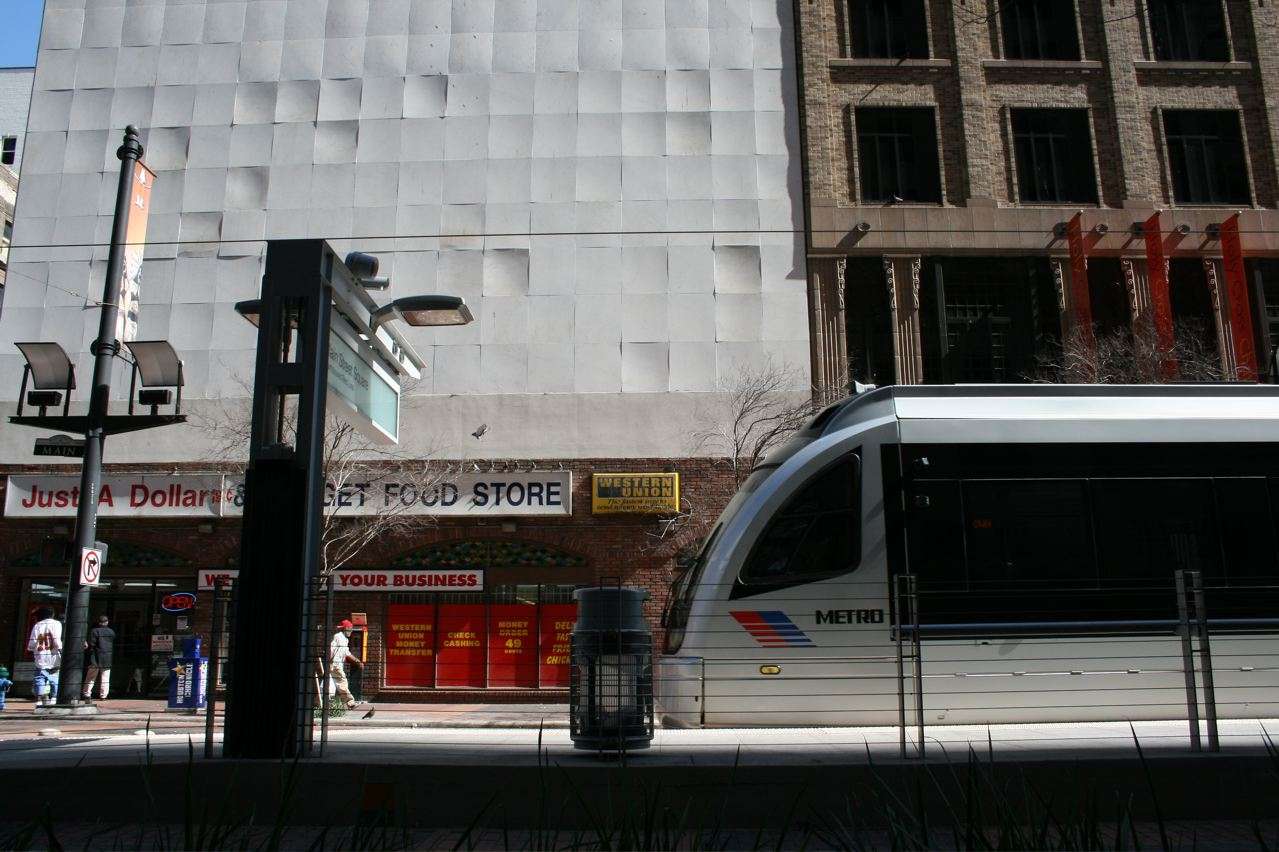
View across the tracks.
