= Bell station (Houston) =

Station on the METRORail transit system

Bell

General information
- Location: Main Street; Between Clay & Bell and Bell & Leeland
- Coordinates: 29°45′13.06″N 95°22′3.3″W
- Owner: METRO
- Line: Red Line
- Platforms: Split Island
- Tracks: Two
- Connections: METRO Community Connector: Downtown Zone

Construction
- Parking: Nearby Public Pay Parking (Not Part of METRO)
- Cycle facilities: Adjacent sidewalk racks, Bicycles allowed on train during off peak times (Weekdays: 9 am-3 pm & 8 pm-Close; Weekends: All Times).
- Accessible: Yes

History
- Opened: January 1, 2004; 22 years ago

Services
Preceding station	METRORail	Following station
Downtown Transit Center toward Fannin South	Red Line	Main Street Square toward Northline Transit Center/HCC
Location

Bell station is a METRORail light rail station in Houston, Texas. The station was opened on January 1, 2004 and is operated by the Metropolitan Transit Authority of Harris County, Texas (METRO). It is located at the intersection of Main Street and Bell Street in Downtown Houston. This is the fourth station heading south along the rail line.

== Points of interest ==
Within several blocks of either platform is the new retail, office & dining complex called GreenStreet. International corporations including Chevron & ExxonMobil also have office buildings within walking distance. It is also the closest stop to the Toyota Center (where the NBA basketball team Houston Rockets play) which is 4 to 5 blocks away.
