= Preston station (Houston) =

Station on the METRORail Red Line in Houston, Texas, USA

Preston
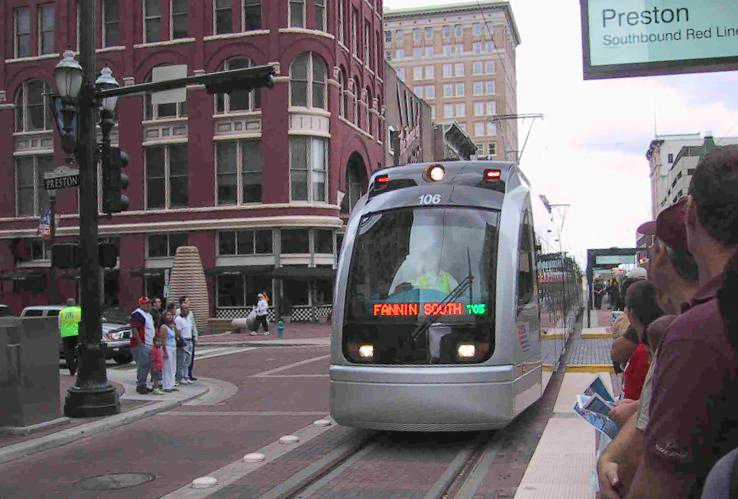

General information
- Location: Main Street; Between Congress & Preston and Preston & Prairie
- Coordinates: 29°45′42.75″N 95°21′39.43″W
- Owner: METRO
- Line: Red Line
- Platforms: Split Island
- Tracks: Two
- Connections: METRO Community Connector: Downtown Zone

Construction
- Parking: Not available
- Cycle facilities: Adjacent sidewalk racks, Bicycles allowed on train during off peak times (Weekdays: 9 am-3 pm & 8 pm-Close; Weekends: All Times).
- Accessible: Yes

History
- Opened: January 1, 2004; 22 years ago

Passengers
- June 2026: 1,573 (avg. weekday ridership) (Qcard)

Services
Preceding station	METRORail	Following station
Central Station toward Fannin South	Red Line	UH–Downtown toward Northline Transit Center/HCC
Location

Preston is a station on the METRORail Red Line in Houston, Texas (USA). The station is located on the 300 block of Main Street, between Preston and Congress avenues in Downtown Houston. Preston Station was designed by two architecture firms, PGAL and M2L Architects. In addition to the station platform, the design includes landscaped medians; two, narrow brick-paved general traffic lanes; and broad sidewalks.

== Points of interest ==
Attractions located within a short walk of the station include:

Listed below are in the Houston Theater District

- The Downtown Aquarium
- Bayou Place
- Alley Theatre
- The Wortham Theater
- Daikin Park
- Jones Hall

The following court buildings are within walking distance:

- Harris County Civil Courts
- Harris County Family Courts
- Harris County Juvenile Courts
- Harris County Criminal Courts

== Hotels ==
- Hotel Icon
- The Magnolia Hotel
- Hotel Alden
- The Lancaster

== Restaurants ==
- Mia Bella

== Bars ==
- Little Dipper
- Captain Foxheart's Bad News Bar
- Pastry War
- Notsouh
- Dean's
- Okra Charity Bar
- Clutch City Squire
- Moving Sidewalk

== Bus connections ==
The following bus route numbers connect to Preston Station

LOCAL: 1 Hospital, 3 Langley/West Gray, 5 Kashmere Gardens/Southmore, 6 Jensen/Tanglewood, 9 North Main/Gulfton, 11 Almeda/Nance, 15 Fulton, 20 Canal/Long Point Limited, 24 Northline, 30 Clinton/Cullen, 44 Acres Homes Limited, 52 Hirsch/Scott, 53 Briar Forest, 56 Airline Limited, 60 South MacGregor, 66 Yale, 77 Liberty/MLK, 78 Alabama/Irvington, 79 West Little York Limited, 80 Dowling/Lyons, 82 Westheimer, 85 Antoine.

LIMITED: 102 Bush IAH Limited, 108 Veterans Memorial Limited, 137 Northshore Limited, 163 Fondren Limited.

COMMUTER: 202 Kuykendahl, 204 Spring, 209 North Corridor Combined, 212 Seton Lake, 221 Kingsland, 244 Monroe, 246 Bay Area, 247 Fuqua, 249 Gulf Corridor Combined, 255 Kingwood, 256 Eastex, 257 Townsen, 259 Eastex Corridor Combined, 262 Westwood, 265 West Bellfort, 269 Southwest Corridor Combined.

== Bibliography ==
- Fox, Stephen (2012). AIA Houston Architectural Guide (Third ed.). Houston: American Institute of Architects, Houston Chapter. ISBN 978-0-615-66959-5.
