= George R. Brown Convention Center =

Convention center in Texas

- Interactive map of George R. Brown Convention Center
- Address: 1001 Avenida de las Americas
- Location: Houston, Texas
- Coordinates: 29°45′8″N 95°21′28″W
- Owner: City of Houston
- Operator: Houston First Corporation
- Public transit: Convention District station

Construction
- Opened: September 26, 1987
- Renovated: 2001–2003; 2014–2016

Website
- www.grbhouston.com

The George R. Brown Convention Center (GRB), opened on September 26, 1987, is located on the east side of Downtown Houston, Texas, United States.

The center was named for internationally recognized entrepreneur, engineer, civic leader, philanthropist and Houstonian George R. Brown (1898–1983). George and his brother, Herman, turned Brown & Root Inc. into the world's largest construction and engineering company. Later, he and investors founded Texas Eastern Transmission Company, which donated six of the 11 blocks required to build the GRB. The center is owned by the city of Houston and managed by the Houston First Corporation. The facility was completed with a price tag of $104.9 million (equivalent to $248 million in 2024), requiring 30 months and more than 1,200 workers. The 100-foot-high (30 m) red-white-and-blue building replaced the obsolete Albert Thomas Convention Center, which was later redeveloped into the Bayou Place entertainment complex in the downtown Houston Theater District. It is the first convention center in the world to have a permanent Bitcoin ATM.

The convention center is served by METRORail light rail service at Convention District station.

== History ==
The center sits where the Pillot House, a house owned by the family of one of the founders of the Henke & Pillot supermarket chain, used to be. The Pillot House was moved to Sam Houston Park in 1965. Designed by John S. Chase, the first licensed Black-American architect in Texas.

The first convention held in the GRB began on October 11, 1987, for the American Society of Travel Agents. A renovation project began on July 28, 2001 to expand the convention center and build an adjacent 1,200-room convention headquarters hotel at a cost of $165 million (equivalent to $278 million in 2024) and requiring 27 months of construction. The adjacent hotel is the Hilton Americas-Houston, which is connected to the convention center via two skywalks. The hotel and convention center are not connected to the Houston tunnel system. The project expanded the center from 1,150,000 to 1,800,000 square feet (107,000 to 167,000 m^{2}). Three exhibit halls were added to increase exhibition space from 451,500 to 853,500 square feet (41,950 to 79,290 m^{2}), and 62 meeting rooms were added for a total of 105. Completion of the project concluded in November 2003, a few months before Super Bowl XXXVIII. There is also a 3,600-seat General Assembly Theater which can be used for concerts, Broadway shows, conferences, meetings, and other events, while Exhibit Hall B3 can be converted into a 6,500-seat indoor arena for concerts and sports using telescopic seating.

At the same time, METRORail was completed on schedule (connecting downtown to the Houston Museum District, Texas Medical Center, and NRG Park), and what is deemed a revived Downtown Houston has opened doors to future conventions (in 2004 and 2008, the Texas Democratic Convention was held at the GRB). The International Quilt Festival and International Quilt Market annually draws about 50,000 per year. In 2008, the 12-acre (4.9 ha) Discovery Green park was completed across the street and three-block GreenStreet (a retail and entertainment complex, anchored by House of Blues) opened four blocks away. A new 700-car parking garage was built under Discovery Green to replace two surface lots removed to make way for the park. The convention center is flanked by Toyota Center (home of the Houston Rockets) and Daikin Park (home of the Houston Astros). With the new improvements, the GRB is one of the 10 largest in the nation.

In November 2014, the ground was broken yet again, this time in preparation for Super Bowl LI. The latest expansion to the GRB includes converting six lanes and the length of five city blocks into ADLA Plaza, a 97,000-square-foot (9,000 m^{2}), pedestrian-friendly, outdoor space. The new Grand Lobby will be 10 stories high and showcase Ed Wilson's 60-foot (18 m) sculpture, "Soaring in the Clouds", suspended from the ceiling in the very center of the GRB. From there, patrons will have improved connectivity to 550,000 square feet (51,000 m^{2}) of prime exhibition space via a 95,000-square-foot (8,800 m^{2}) Grand Concourse. Construction is set to be completed by late 2016.

Opened in late 2016 and located at the north end of the GRB is the Marriott Marquis, which connects to the GRB via skybridge. This unique property boasts 1,000 guest rooms and a Texas-shaped lazy river. An additional 2,461 rooms are being added to Houston's downtown hotel inventory in eight unique properties. By late 2016, there will be more than 7,700 rooms in 24 hotels downtown.

After Hurricane Katrina, approximately 7,000 people went to the convention center, due to the Astrodome being at its full capacity.

In 2009, a televised audition of the show America's Got Talent was filmed at the convention center.

From May 4–15, 1998, Wheel of Fortune aired two weeks of shows that were taped in the center in April 1998, including College Week from May 11–15.

Many graduations from local high schools and colleges are held at the convention center.

The annual FIRST Robotics world championships have taken place in the convention center from 2017-2019, and from 2022 to the present. The event takes place in April and uses up all the space in the convention center, spanning all the floors. In 2023, the event drew 18,000 students from 59 countries.

Houston's largest pop-culture event Comicpalooza draws a massive crowd every year and continues to increase as the convention becomes more popular.

One month after opening on October 28, 1987; the PBS series Firing Line hosted a special 2-hour debate featuring the six major candidates seeking the 1988 Republican nomination for President. The following year; one of those candidates, incumbent Vice-President and longtime Houston resident George H. W. Bush would hold his victory celebration at the convention center.

== Race history ==
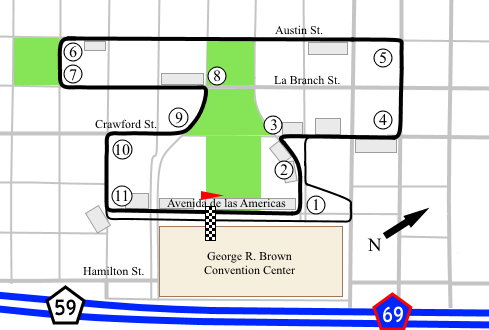
The original track layout from 1998 to 2001

From 1998 to 2001, Championship Auto Racing Teams (CART) held a race on Houston's downtown streets, adjacent to the GRB. This event was sponsored by the oil company Texaco and named the Texaco Grand Prix of Houston. However, construction in Downtown Houston resulted in the race not being renewed for the 2002 CART season.

== Gallery ==
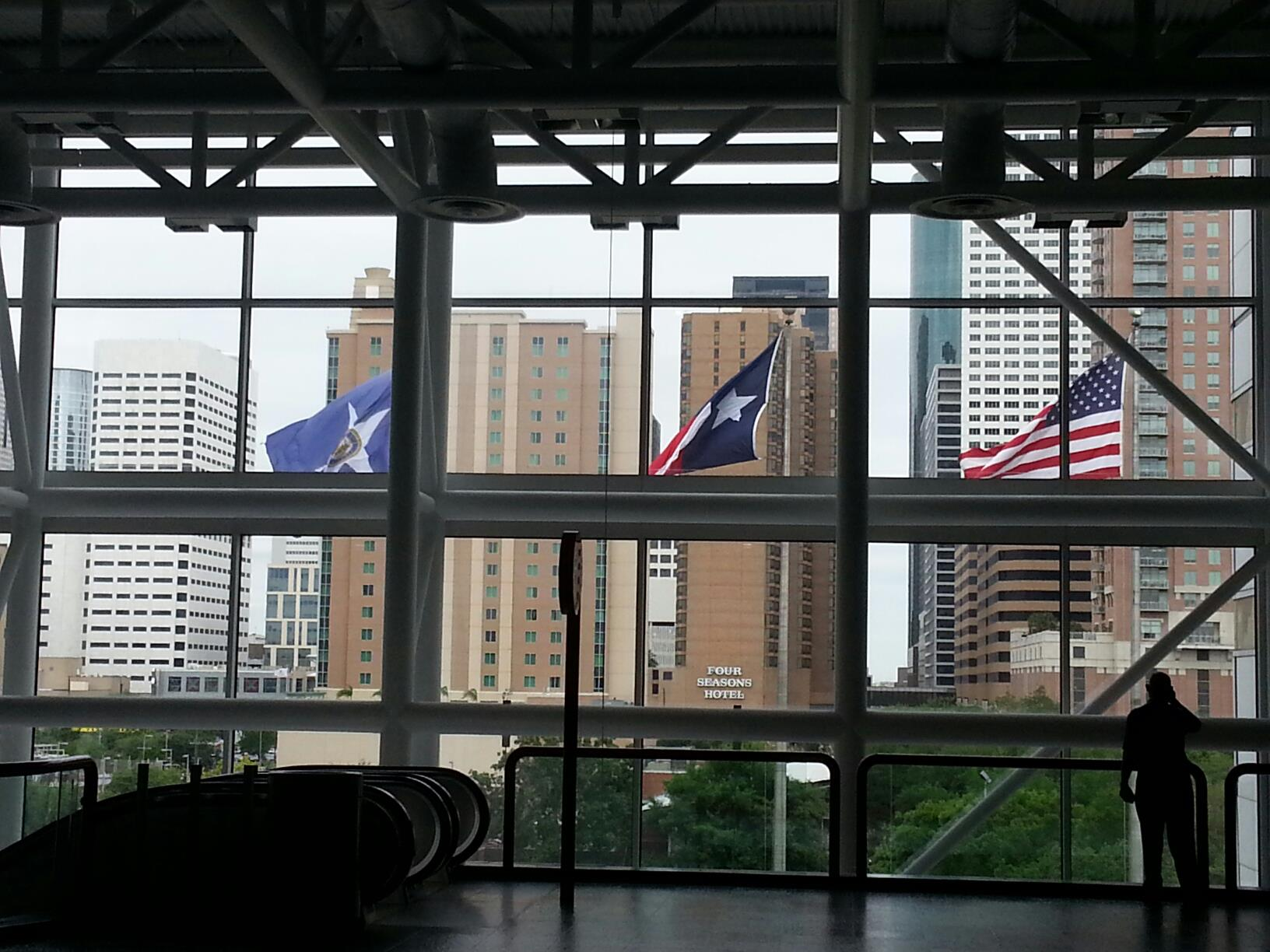
A view of Downtown Houston from inside the GRB

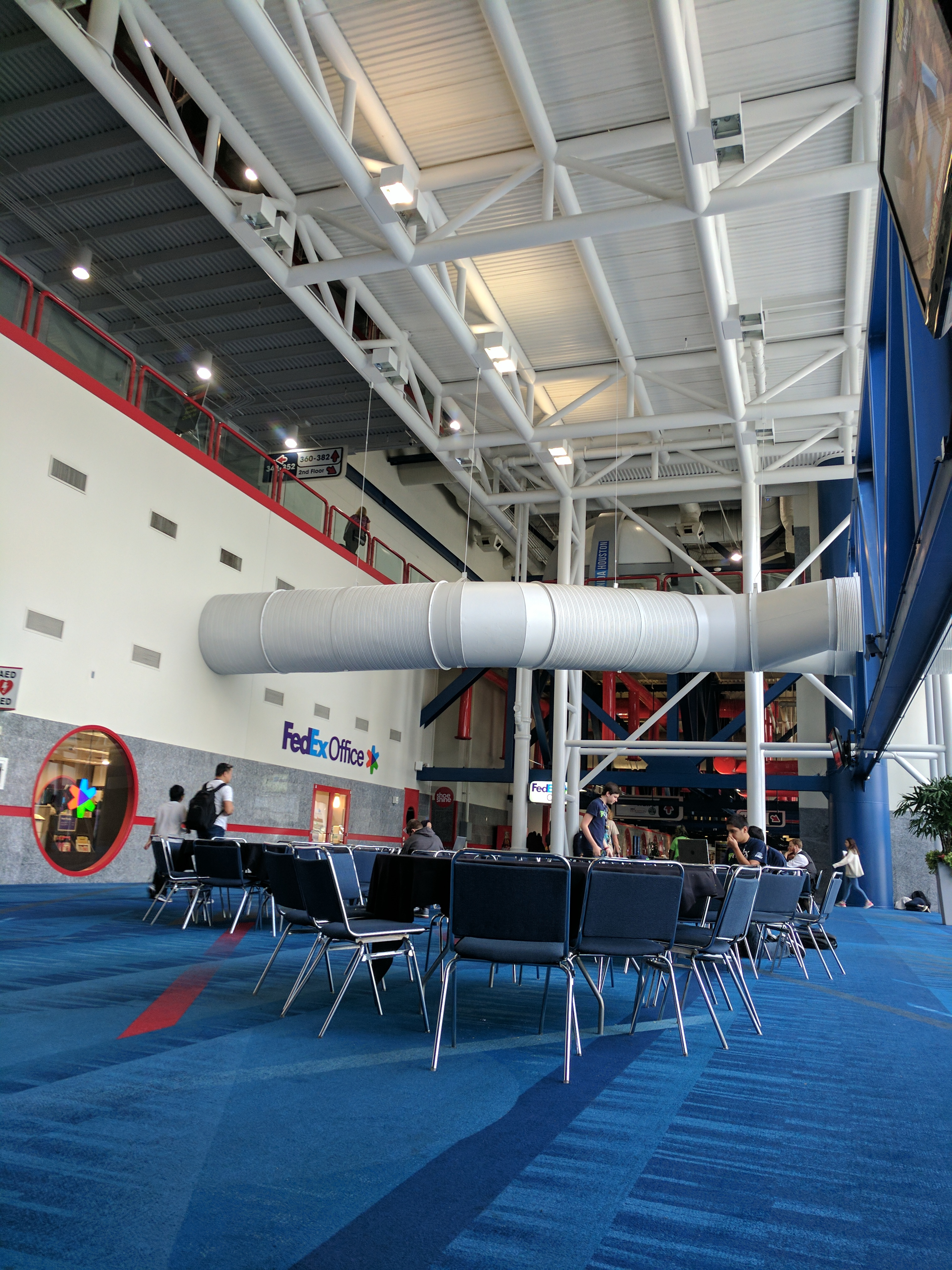
A view of the interior second floor

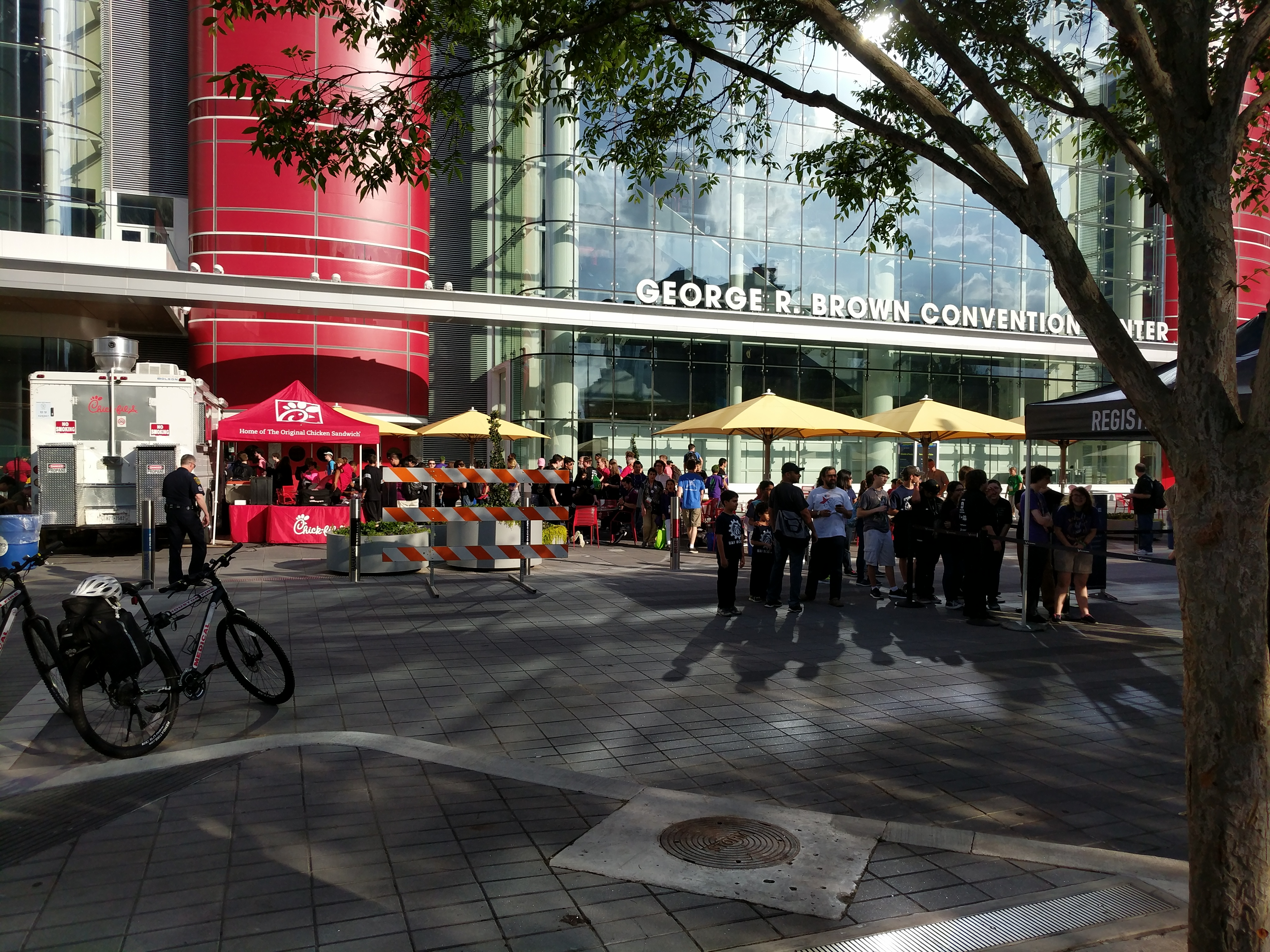
Front exterior
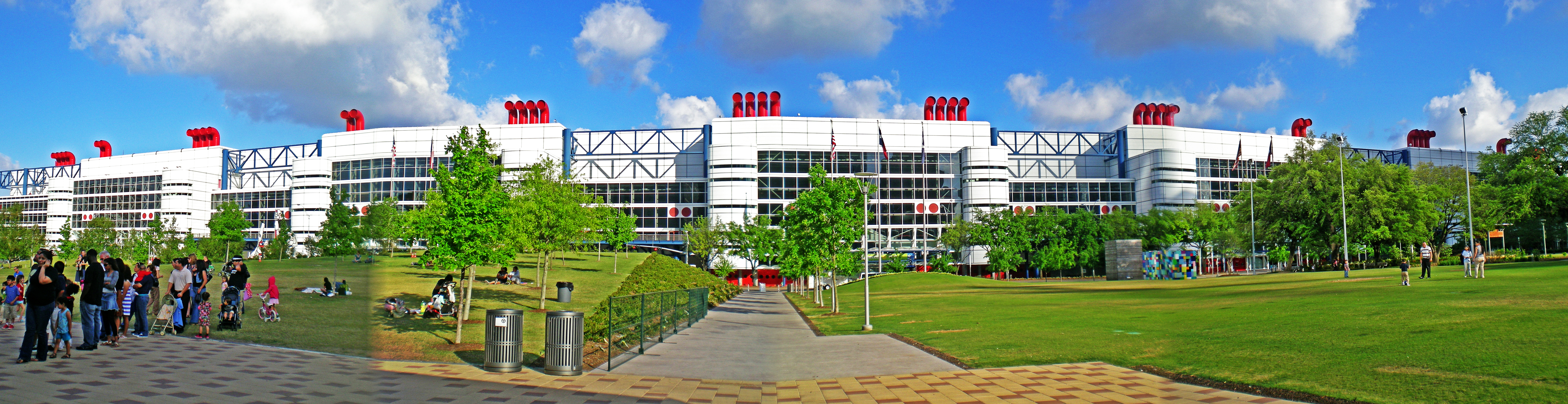
A view of the GRB from Discovery Green (prior to 2016 renovation)
