= METRORail Green Line =

Houston light rail line

Green Line

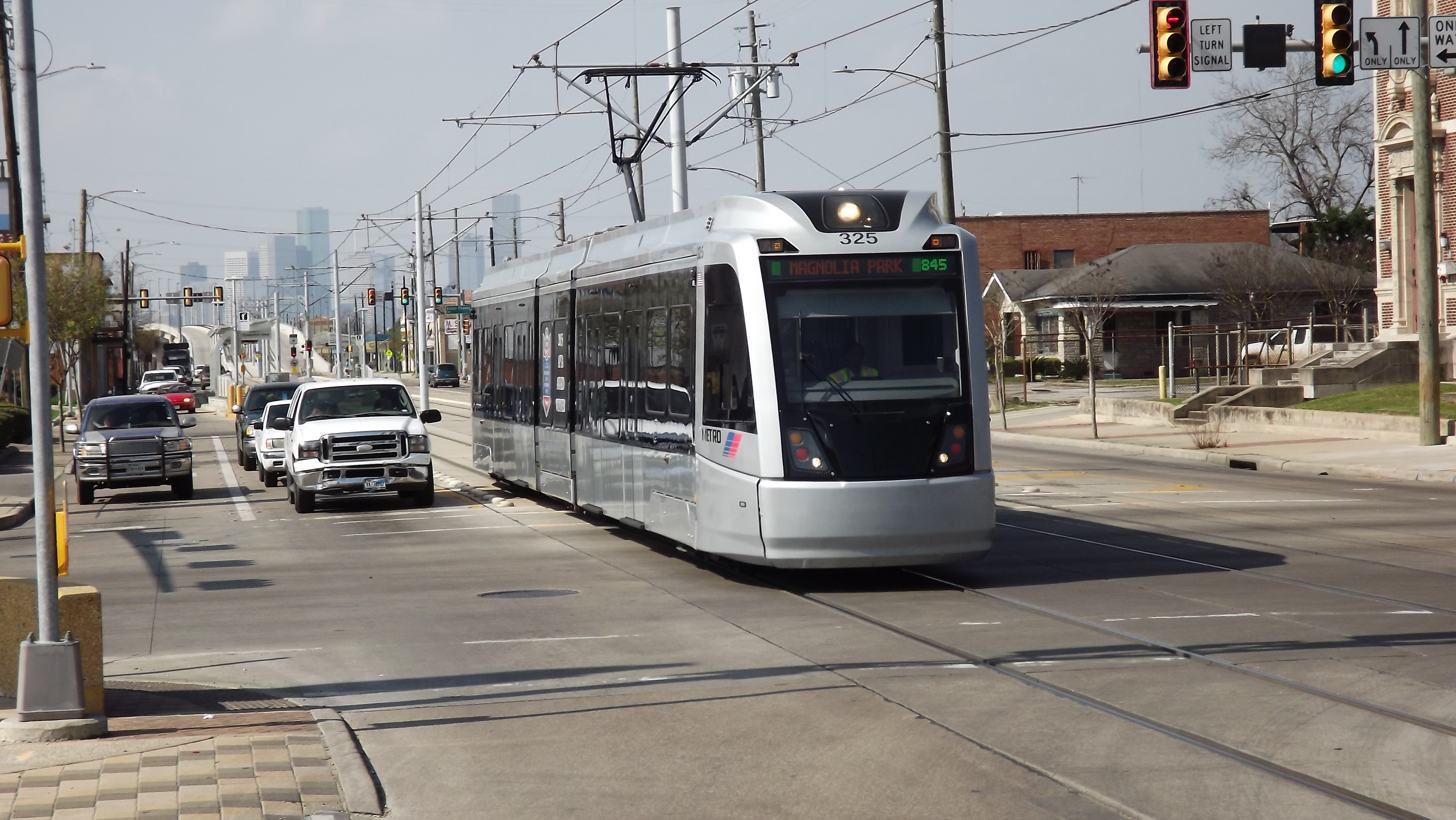
- Green Line train running along Harrisburg Boulevard at Wayside Drive

Overview
- Status: Operating
- Locale: Houston, Texas
- Termini: Theater District (west); Magnolia Park Transit Center (east)
- Stations: 9

Service
- Type: Light rail/Streetcar
- System: METRORail
- Operator: METRO
- Daily ridership: 4,188 (September 2023)

History
- Opened: May 23, 2015

Technical
- Line length: 3.3 mi (5.3 km)
- Character: Street running downtown, exclusive right-of-way elsewhere
- Track gauge: 4 ft 8 1/2 in (1,435 mm)
- Electrification: Overhead cantenary
- Highest elevation: Street level until Altic/Howard Hughes, then returns to street level. Elevated overpass between the streets.
Route map
Key

The Green Line is a 3.3 mi (5.3 km) METRORail light rail/streetcar line operated by METRO in Houston, Texas, serving the East End area. The first seven-station segment of this line opened on May 23, 2015. The two-station eastern end of this route was delayed due to issues over crossing Union Pacific Railroad tracks, but eventually opened in January 2017.

== Route ==
Between Theater District and EaDo/Stadium stations, the Green Line shares tracks with the Purple Line. In downtown, the eastbound track runs along Capitol Street, while its westbound counterpart runs along Rusk Street. On both of these streets, trains operate in mixed traffic using the rightmost lane. Transfers to the Red Line will occur at the Fannin Station. Before crossing I-69/US 59, the 2 tracks converge onto a dedicated right-of-way along the south side of Texas Avenue to EaDo/Stadium Station, which will give access to the BBVA Compass Stadium where the MLS soccer team Houston Dynamo & Texas Southern Tigers football play. East of EaDo/Stadium Station, the Green Line and the Purple Line diverge, with the Purple Line turning south and the East End Line continuing east.

The Green line continues in a dedicated right-of-way on the south side of Harrisburg Road, which transitions to the center of Harrisburg Road at Middleton Street. It remains in the median to its former eastern terminus at Altic/Howard Hughes Station.

A six-block-long bridge carries the line over freight rail tracks located on Harrisburg and Hughes, extending the line eastward to the Magnolia Transit Center. Construction of this bridge began in March 2015 and finished in late 2016, with the extension opening on January 11, 2017.

== Construction ==
Phase I of construction was due to be completed by spring 2012, with Phase II scheduled to be complete by summer 2012, and a planned opening in 2013 or 2014. By fall 2010, it became clear that a late 2013 opening was impossible, and the line would not open until late 2014.

Problems with non-MetroRAIL construction projects downtown, as well as with the axle-counters used to regulate light rail traffic, subsequently pushed back the opening of the line to April and then May 2015.

=== Opposition to east end of line ===
As early as about a month after construction began for this line, it was reported that opposition existed to this line, particularly because of the installation of the six-block-long bridge meant to avoid the freight railroad at the east end of the line. Further opposition to this line arose when area resident began to notice a loss in business in areas where construction was taking place. Subsequently, Metro decided to build the western portion of the line in the meantime, while the construction of the portion of the line between Altic/Howard Hughes Station and Magnolia Transit Center Station was deferred.

An overpass segment meant to avoid the freight railroad track and to complete the line between Altic/Howard Hughes Station and Magnolia Transit Center is expected to take up to 18 months to complete and broke ground in March, 2015. The bridge was completed in early 2017, and the first train traveled across it on January 9, with regular service beginning on the 11th, which marked the completion of the Green Line to its Magnolia terminus.

== Stations ==
The following is a list of stations for the Green Line, listed in order from west to east.

Station	Opening year	Connections	
Station	Opening year	METRORail	METRO Bus
Theater District	2015	METRORail Purple Line	20, 30, 44, 85, 151, 161/162, Park & Ride routes
Central Station (Capitol/Rusk)	2015	METRORail Purple Line METRORail Red Line	6, 11, 51/52, 82, 102, 108, 137, Park & Ride routes
Convention District	2015	METRORail Purple Line	500
EaDo/Stadium	2015	METRORail Purple Line	
Coffee Plant/Second Ward	2015		29
Lockwood/Eastwood	2015		80
Altic/Howard Hughes	2015		
MSG Joe E. Ramirez	2017		
Magnolia Park Transit Center	2017		20, 28, 38, 50, 76

== Expansion ==
A possible expansion for the line would bring it south from the Magnolia Transit Center to converge with the Purple Line at a station yet to be named, and moving along the same right-of-way to Hobby Airport.

== See also ==
- METRORail Purple Line
