= METRORail Purple Line =

Light rail line in Houston, Texas

Purple Line

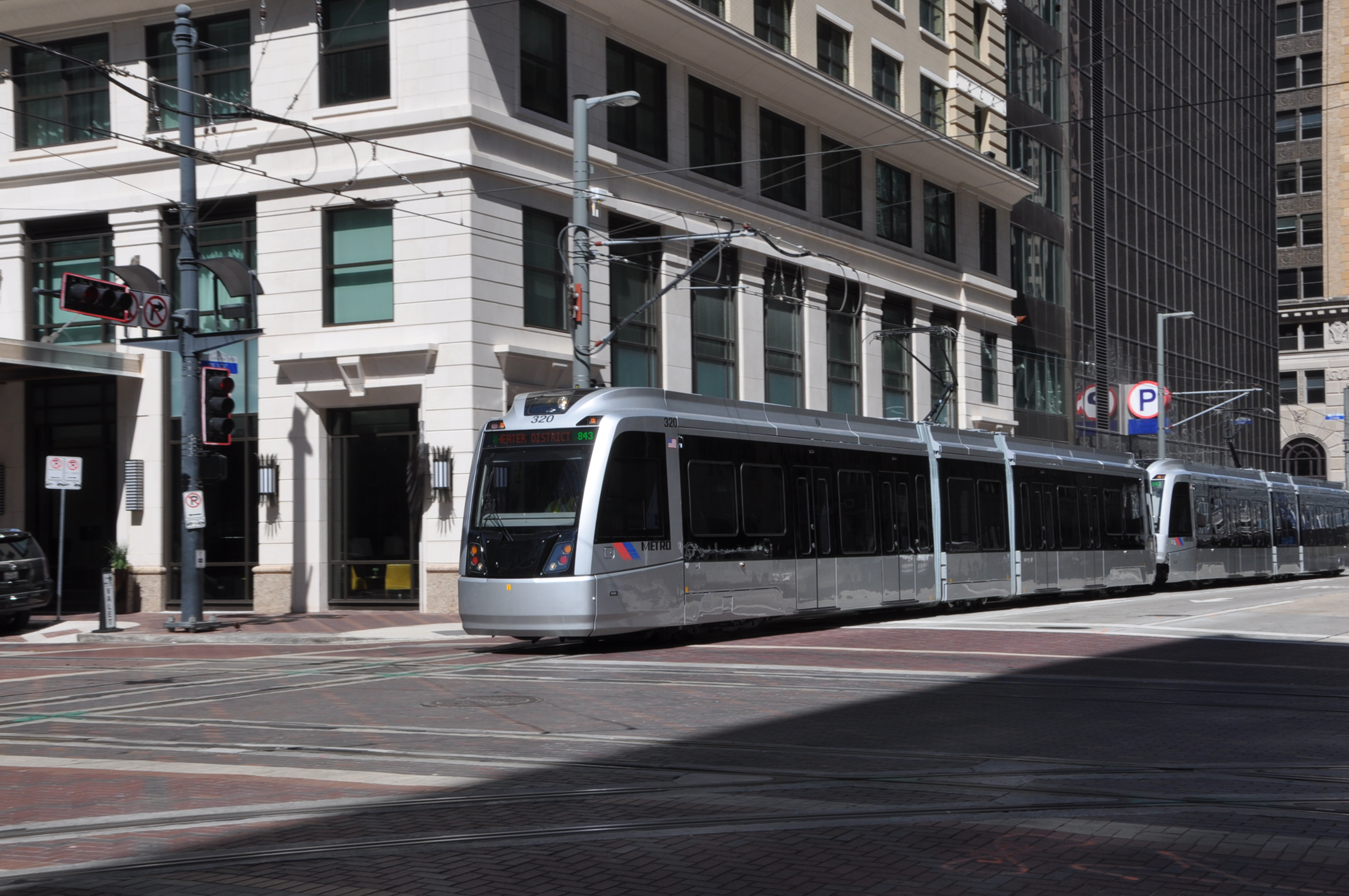

Overview
- Status: Operating
- Locale: Houston, Texas, U.S.
- Termini: Theater District Station (north); Palm Center Transit Center (south)
- Stations: 10

Service
- Type: Light rail/Streetcar
- System: METRORail
- Operator(s): METRO
- Daily ridership: 5,692 (September 2023)

History
- Opened: May 23, 2015; 10 years ago

Technical
- Line length: 6.6 mi (10.6 km)
- Character: Street running downtown, exclusive right-of-way elsewhere
- Track gauge: 4 ft 8 1/2 in (1,435 mm)
- Electrification: Overhead catenary
- Highest elevation: At-grade with city streets
Route map
Key

The Purple Line is a 6.6-mile (10.6 km) METRORail light rail/streetcar route operated by METRO in Houston, Texas, United States, serving Southeast Houston. The line opened on May 23, 2015.

== Route ==
The Purple Line begins at its northern terminus at Smith Street with split tracks on Capitol and Rusk Streets. The northbound track will run along Capitol Street in downtown, while its southbound counterpart will run down Rusk Street. Both of these downtown sections involve street running in mixed traffic like a traditional streetcar line. Four of the line's stations will be in downtown with stops at Smith, Main, Fannin, and Crawford. Transfers to the Red Line will occur at the Fannin Station. Before crossing I-69/US 59 the 2 tracks converge to run together on Texas into the East End where it and the Green Line diverge after EaDo/Stadium Station, which has access to the Shell Energy Stadium, the home venue of the Texas Southern Tigers football, Houston Dynamo & Houston Dash.

From here, the line continues southward towards the next stop at Leeland. Traveling south on Scott Street leads to the next stop, which will be at the intersection of Elgin Street—providing access and transfers to the University/Blue Line. The next stop at Cleburne will provide access to the University of Houston and Texas Southern University. The route then takes a southeastern turn onto Wheeler to the UH South/University Oaks Station, which also provides access to the University of Houston. Turning onto Martin Luther King Drive, the route will head to the MacGregor Park Station. Another southeastern turn onto Griggs leads to the line's southern terminus, the Palm Center Transit Center. From here the tracks continue a short distance further into a storage facility for the METRORail trains.

== Construction ==
Construction began July 2009. On December 8, 2011, the FTA announced the award of a $450 million grant from the New Starts transit program to fund construction of the Purple Line. Phase I construction was due to be completed by Spring 2011, with Phase II construction finishing by Fall 2013, and a planned opening for 2013 or 2014. By fall 2010, it became clear that a late 2013 opening was impossible, and the line would not open until late 2014.

The construction was temporarily halted in the summer of 2012, when the University of Houston opposed the line's initial route around the campus, though the dispute was soon settled.

Problems with non-MetroRAIL construction projects downtown, as well as with the axle-counters used to regulate light rail traffic, subsequently pushed back the opening of the line to April 2015, and subsequently to May 23, 2015.

New plans are in the works for the connection from palm center and the Hobby airport.

== Stations ==
The following is a list of stations for the Purple Line, listed in order from north to south.

| Station | Opening year | Connections | |
| Station | Opening year | METRORail | METRO Bus |
|---|---|---|---|
| Theater District | 2015 | METRORail Green Line | 20, 30, 44, 85, 151, 161/162, Park & Ride routes |
| Central Station (Capitol/Rusk) | 2015 | METRORail Green Line METRORail Red Line | 6, 11, 51/52, 82, 102, 108, 137, Park & Ride routes |
| Convention District | 2015 | METRORail Green Line | 500 |
| EaDo/Stadium | 2015 | METRORail Green Line | |
| Leeland/Third Ward | 2015 | | 29, 40/41 |
| Elgin/Third Ward | 2015 | | 29, 54 |
| TSU/UH Athletics District | 2015 | | 4, 9, 25, 54 |
| UH South/University Oaks | 2015 | | 25, 80 |
| MacGregor Park/Martin Luther King, Jr. | 2015 | | 28, 80 |
| Palm Center Transit Center | 2015 | | 5, 87 |
Future Extension to William P. Hobby Airport.
| Telephone/Long | TBA | | 005, 040 |
| Bellfort | TBA | | 040, 073, 076 |
| Hobby Car Rental | TBA | | 040 |
| Hobby Airport | TBA | | 040, 050, 073, 088 |

== Expansion ==
A possible expansion for the Purple Line would allow it to head east onto Griggs Road and into the Gulfbank area. From there it would head south to William P. Hobby Airport.

== Impact on students ==
The light rail route was intended to benefit students of the University of Houston and Texas Southern University, by giving students (especially those without transportation) access to Houston's attractions and Downtown restaurants and nightlife. METRO acknowledges college students to be the biggest rider demographic for the Purple Line.

== See also ==
- METRORail Green Line
