= Southeast Houston =

Human settlement in Houston, Texas, United States of America

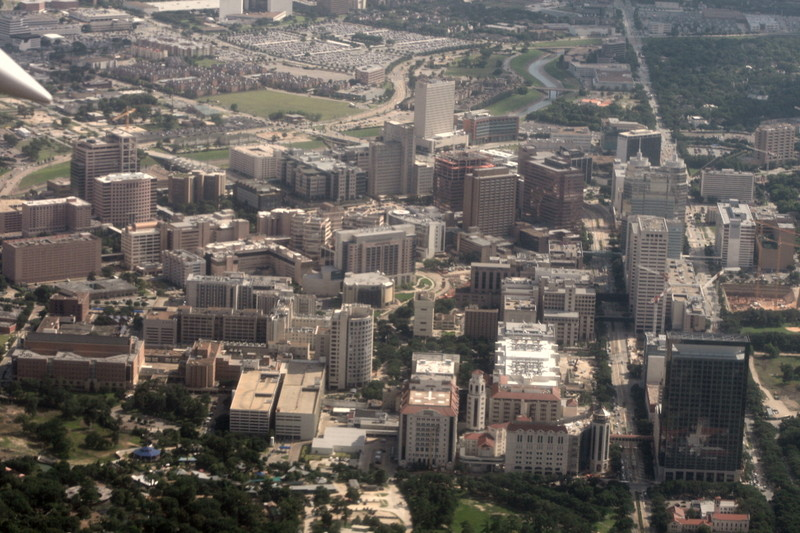
Aerial of the Texas Medical Center, an area in the Southeast Houston district.

Southeast Houston is an area in Houston, Texas, United States. The Greater Southeast Management District (GSMD) manages a district using the name Southeast Houston. Communities within the district include the Third Ward, Texas Medical Center, Riverside Terrace, University Oaks, and Washington Terrace.

== History ==
The Texas Legislature created the Greater Southeast Management District in 2001. In 2005 District 146 was removed from the GSMD boundaries. Borris Miles, the area state representative, passed House Bill 1383, which would restore the original boundaries of the district.

== Economy ==
Grocers Supply's headquarters are within the district.

== Government and infrastructure ==
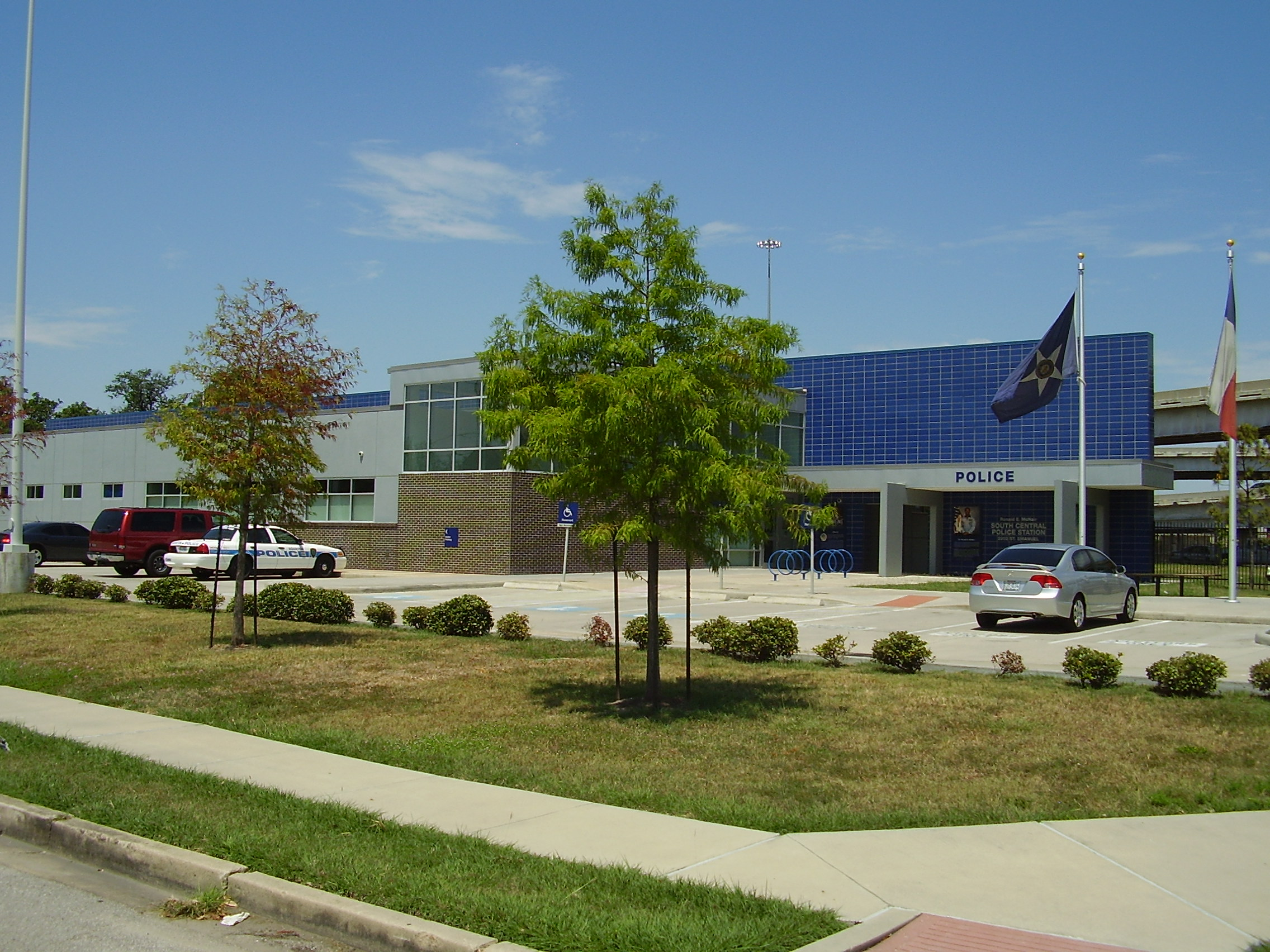
Ronald E. McNair South Central Police Station

The Greater Southeast Management District is headquartered in Suite 503 at 5445 Almeda Road.

The Houston Police Department's South Central Patrol Division, in the Third Ward, serves most of the district. Portions of the district are served by the Southeast Patrol Division.

Houston Fire Department Station 25 Third Ward, in Fire District 46, serves Southeast Houston. The station opened at the intersection of Blodgett and Velasco in 1928 and opened in its current location at Rosewood at Scott in 1979. In addition Station 33 Medical Center, a part of Fire District 21, is in Southeast Houston. The original Firehouse 33 was one of the last stations to be housed in an original volunteer fire station. The original Station 33 was the city hall/fire station of Braeswood. The City of Houston annexed the area in 1950. The current Fire Station 33 opened one block from the original station in August 2004. The city relinquished its ownership of the original fire station.

== Education ==
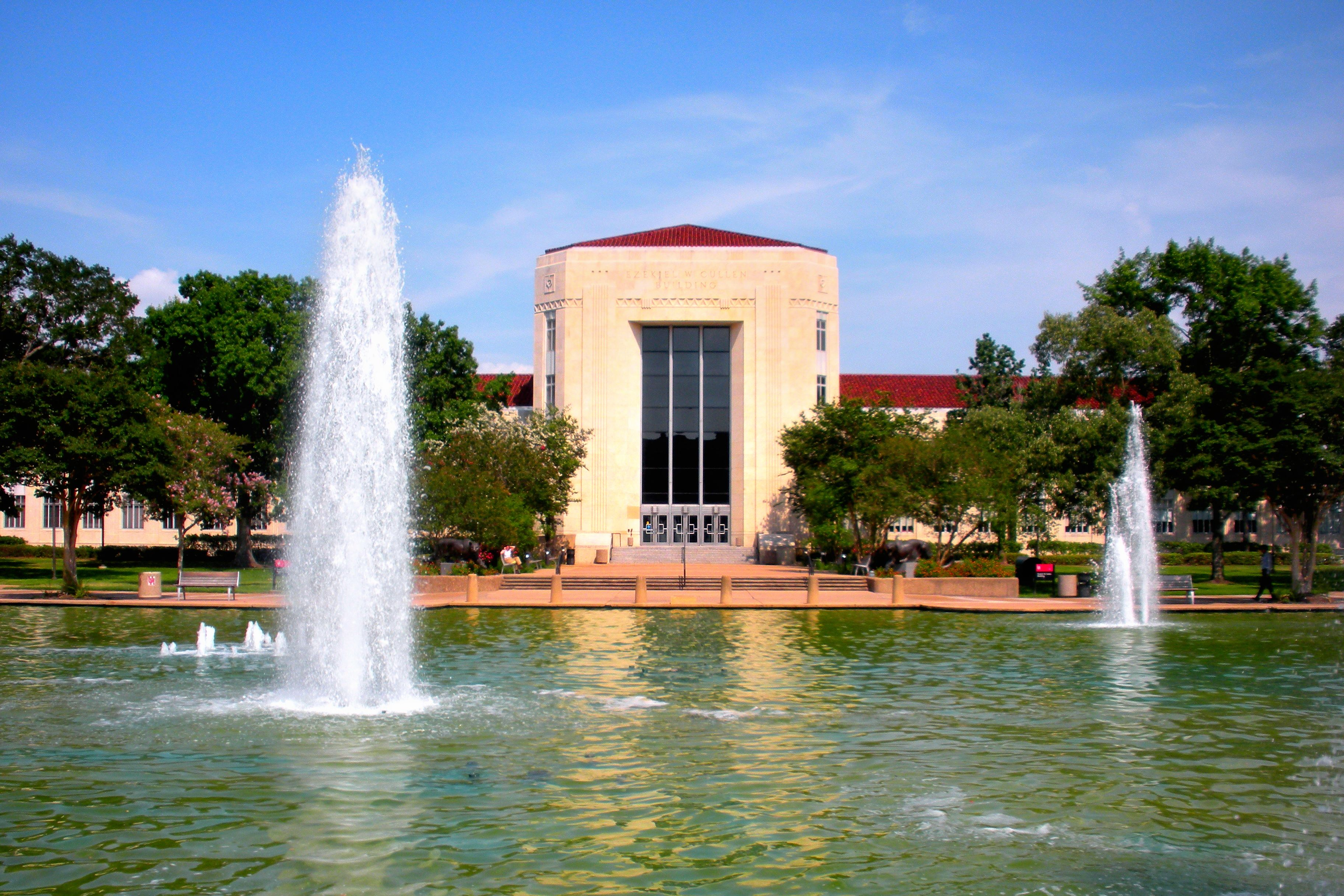
University of Houston

=== Colleges and universities ===
Two state universities are located within the Greater Southeast Houston Management District.

The University of Houston is a nationally recognized Tier One research university, and is the flagship institution of the University of Houston System. The third-largest university in Texas, the University of Houston has nearly 40,000 students on its 667-acre campus in southeast Houston.

Within the Houston's historic Third Ward community is Texas Southern University. Founded in 1927, it is one of the largest historically black colleges and universities in the United States. In addition, TSU has specialized professional academic programs in pharmacy and law.

The Houston Community College System is the area community college system.

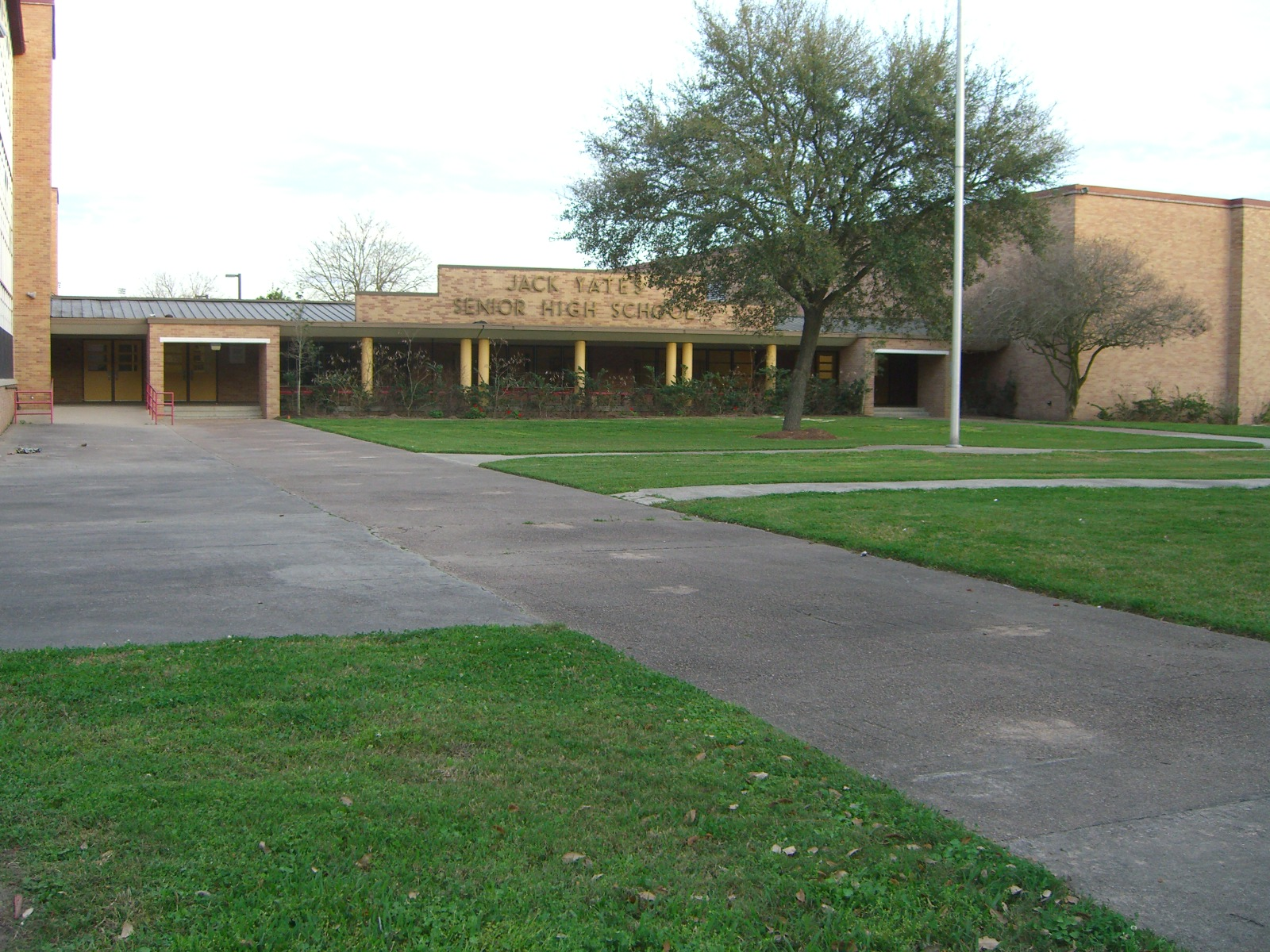
Yates High School

=== Public schools ===
The community is zoned to Houston Independent School District (HISD) schools. The community is within Trustee District IV, represented by Paula M. Harris as of 2008.

Middle schools serving sections of Southeast Houston district include Cullen and Ryan, both in the management district. Lamar and Yates high schools serve sections of Southeast Houston; Lamar is outside of the district while Yates is in the district.
