= Magnolia Park Transit Center =

Light rail station in Houston, Texas, US

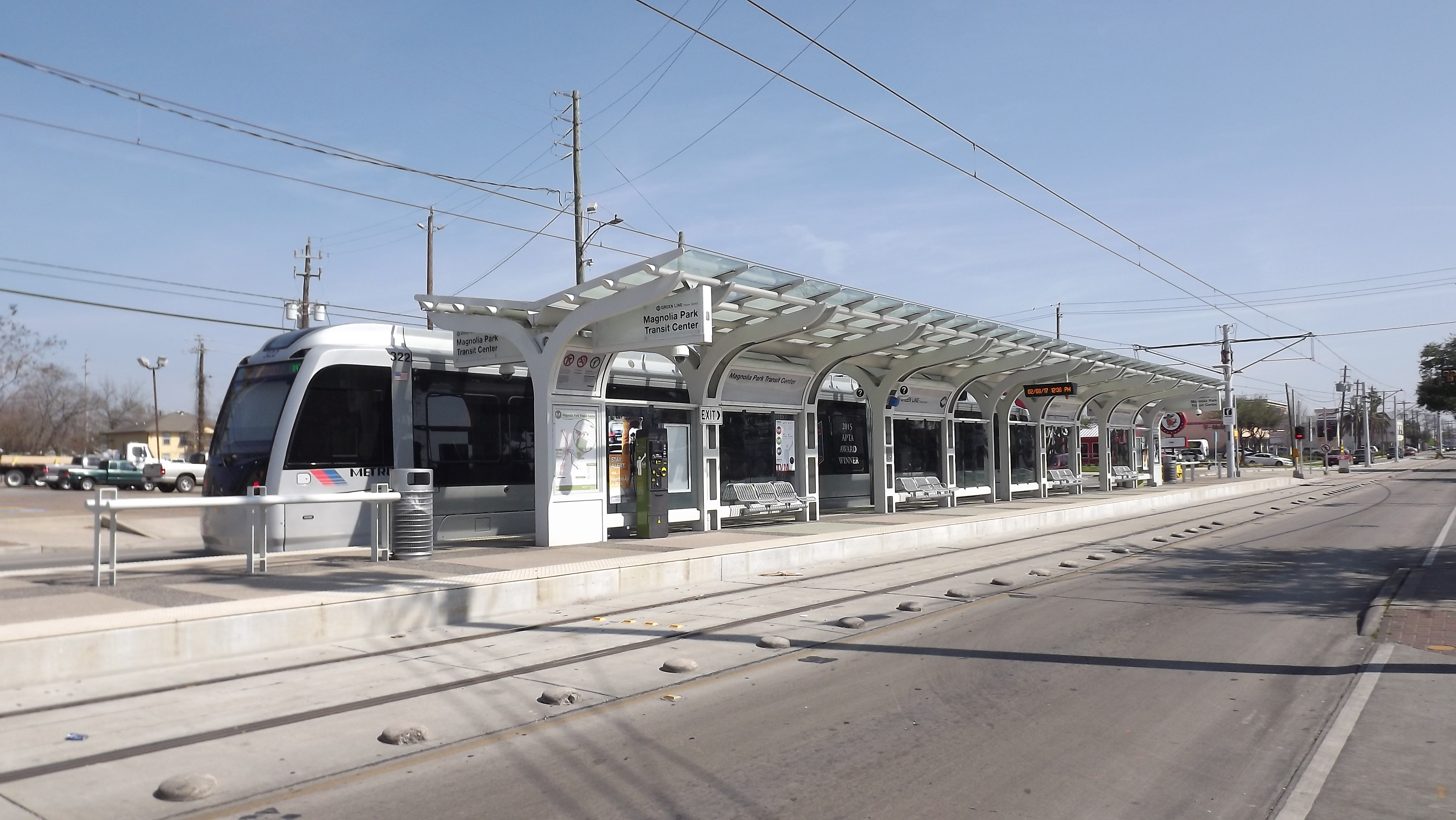
- Station platform, February 2017

General information
- Location: Harrisburg Blvd and 70th Street; Houston, Texas
- Coordinates: 29°44′09.2″N 95°18′10.4″W
- Owner: METRO
- Line: Green Line
- Platforms: 1 island platform
- Tracks: 2

Construction
- Structure type: Surface
- Accessible: yes

History
- Opened: January 11, 2017

Services
Preceding station	METRORail	Following station
MSG Joe E. Ramirez toward Theater District	Green Line	Terminus
Location

Magnolia Park Transit Center is a light rail and bus station in Houston, Texas on the METRORail system. It is the eastern terminus of the Green Line and is located on Harrisburg Boulevard at 70th Street in Magnolia Park, in the East End. Nearby the station are many restaurants and taquerias. The Magnolia Park shopping center is a half block down the street at Harrisburg and Sgt. Macario Garcia Drive.

The light rail station opened on January 11, 2017, as part of the Green Line's second phase, extending it east from its initial terminus at Altic/Howard Hughes station.

== Bus routes ==
- 20: Canal/Memorial
- 28: OST–Wayside
- 38: Manchester–Lawndale
- 50: Broadway to Hobby Airport
- 76: Evergreen

== Multi-Modal Facilities ==
The Magnolia Park Transit Center is bound by Harrisburg and the Green Line to the North, 70th Street to the East, Capitol Street to the South, and commercial developments to the West.

The Magnolia Park TC includes access to the METRORail Green Line which runs west towards the Theater District in Downtown Houston. The Magnolia Park TC serves as the eastern terminus of the line. The transit center features local bus service, a pickup/drop-off drive, passenger canopy, B-Cycle bike share kiosk, and a Park & Ride parking lot.

Future southeast expansion of the Green Line to Hobby Airport is in the planning stages and would serve as a direct connector between one of Houston's major airports and Downtown Houston. BCycle currently serves the transit center, however, it is anticipated that the transit center will house METRO Bikeshare in the future following announcement of their forthcoming bike-share program.

=== Parking ===
- There is a Park and Ride lot for vehicles across Capitol St that includes 78 total parking stalls (4 of which are ADA stalls)
- Limited bike parking available
- No bike lockers or storage facilities

=== Transport ===
- Light Rail
- Local Bus
- Private/Uber/Lyft pickup and drop-off drive
- BCycle, METRO Bikeshare (future)

=== Intercity ===
The Magnolia Park Transit Center is in proximity to many private bus service terminals that provide Intercity travel to cities across the United States, primarily across the South, and Mexico. Nearby private bus services include:

- Autobuses Americanos (7000 Harrisburg Blvd, Houston, TX 77011)
- Greyhound SE Bus Station (7000 Harrisburg Blvd, Houston, TX 77011)
- Grupo Senda (7011 Harrisburg Blvd, Houston, TX 77011)
- Turimex Internacional (7011 Harrisburg Blvd, Houston, TX 77011)
- Zima Real Bus Line (6949 Harrisburg Blvd, Houston, TX 77011)

Common US destinations include:

- Atlanta, Georgia
- Austin, Texas
- Dallas, Texas
- Charlotte, North Carolina
- Chicago, Illinois
- Huntsville, Alabama
- Kansas City, Missouri
- Memphis, Tennessee
- Mobile, Alabama
- Montgomery, Alabama
- Nashville, Tennessee
- Natchez, Mississippi
- Raleigh, North Carolina
- San Antonio, Texas

Common Mexican destinations include:

- Guadalajara, Jalisco
- Matehuala, San Luis Potosí
- Mexico City, Mexico
- Monterrey, Nuevo Leon
- Morelia, Michoacan
- Reynosa, Tamaulipas
- San Luis Potosí, San Luis Potosí
- Tampico, Tamaulipas

=== Trails ===
There are Hike & Bike trails and bike lanes within proximity to the Magnolia Park Transit Center. Alignments within a mile of the transit center include the following:

- Capitol Street Bike Shareway
- Brays Bayou Greenway Trail
- Sunset Hike & Bike Trail
- Harrisburg Hike & Bike Trail
- Lawndale Bike Lane
- 72nd Street/Forest Hill Bike Lane (future)
