= Palm Center Transit Center =

Light rail station in Houston, Texas, US

General information
- Location: Griggs Road and Royal Palms Street; Houston, Texas
- Coordinates: 29°41′47.4″N 95°19′56.6″W
- Owner: METRO
- Line: Purple Line
- Platforms: 1 island platform
- Tracks: 2
- Connections: 5, 87

Construction
- Structure type: Surface
- Accessible: yes

History
- Opened: May 23, 2015

Services
Preceding station	METRORail	Following station
MacGregor Park/Martin Luther King Jr. toward Theater District	Purple Line	Terminus
Location

Palm Center Transit Center is a light rail station in Houston, Texas on the METRORail system. It is the terminus of the Purple Line and is located on Griggs Road near Beekman Road in the Palm Center neighborhood.

Palm Center Transit Center opened to light rail service on May 23, 2015.
