= Theater District station =

Light rail station in Houston, Texas

Theater District

General information
- Location: Houston, Texas
- Coordinates: 29°45′39.3″N 95°22′00.8″W
- System: Light rail station
- Owner: METRO
- Lines: Green Line; Purple Line
- Platforms: 2
- Tracks: 2

Construction
- Structure type: Surface
- Accessible: yes

History
- Opened: May 23, 2015

Services
Preceding station	METRORail	Following station
Terminus	Green Line	Central Station toward Magnolia Park Transit Center
Terminus	Purple Line	Central Station toward Palm Center Transit Center
Location

Theater District is a light rail station in Houston, Texas on the METRORail system. It is the western terminus of the Green and Purple lines, and is located on Capitol and Rusk streets near Smith Street. The station is named for the Houston Theater District.

Theater District station opened on May 23, 2015.
