= Chinquapin Preparatory School =

School in Highlands, Texas, US

- Chinquapin Prep Logo

Location
- 2615 E Wallisville Rd; Highlands, Texas, 77562; United States; 29.8207°N 95.0217°W

Information
- Type: Nonprofit private college-preparatory school
- Motto: Latin: Quid pro Quo (Something for Something)
- Established: 1969
- Founder: Robert and Maxine Moore
- Director: Mily S. Pérez, M.Ed.
- Faculty: 21
- Key people: Bill & Kathy Heinzerling, Bob & Maxine Moore
- Grades: 6–12
- Enrollment: 156
- Campus type: Rural
- Colors: Black, white, and red
- Athletics: basketball, cross country, soccer, track and field, volleyball
- Athletics conference: Texas Association of Private and Parochial Schools
- Mascot: Burr
- Accreditation: Texas Alliance of Accredited Private Schools
- Newspaper: The Burr
- Website: www.chinquapin.org

Chinquapin Preparatory School is a nonprofit private college-preparatory school with grades six through twelve. It serves low-income youth, particularly minorities from the Greater Houston area. The school, accredited by the Texas Alliance of Accredited Private Schools, is located in Highlands in unincorporated Harris County, Texas, US, near Baytown.

Chinquapin Prep, along with Cristo Rey Jesuit College Preparatory of Houston and Yellowstone Schools, is one of the few Greater Houston private schools that caters to low income students.

== History ==
The Chinquapin School was founded by Robert P. Moore — formerly head of the English Department at St. John's School in Houston and his wife Maxine. Incorporated in March 1969 as a school for boys, it was funded with a grant from The Brown Foundation of Houston. The school changed its name to Chinquapin Preparatory School in 2010. The school's motto is Quid pro Quo (Latin: Something for Something).

== Operations ==
As of 2023 the school has boarding facilities which can take students in grades 6-12 of all genders; the school permits students in middle school to board if the school grants approval, and the boarding facility requires proof of a "demonstrated need" for girls in grades 6-7 and boys in grade 6. In 2006 the boarding facility was only for boys in the 7th and 8th grades, while girls of all grades and 6th grade boys were not permitted to use the boarding facility.

The school provides teacher residences on its property.

Funds given by private entities make up, as of 2006, the majority of the funds used by the school to operate.

== Academics ==
In 2010, Chinquapin added the Urban Teaching Fellows Program, an initiative that exposes recent college graduates to teaching, coaching, and residential life at boarding schools.

== Athletics ==
Chinquapin is grouped in TAPPS Division 2A and competes in basketball, bowling, cross country, soccer, tennis, track and field, and volleyball.

== Notable alumni ==
- Jarvis Johnson, member of the Texas House of Representatives
- Nhial "Simon" Malia, a Lost Boy of Sudan
