= J. Elle =

American fiction author

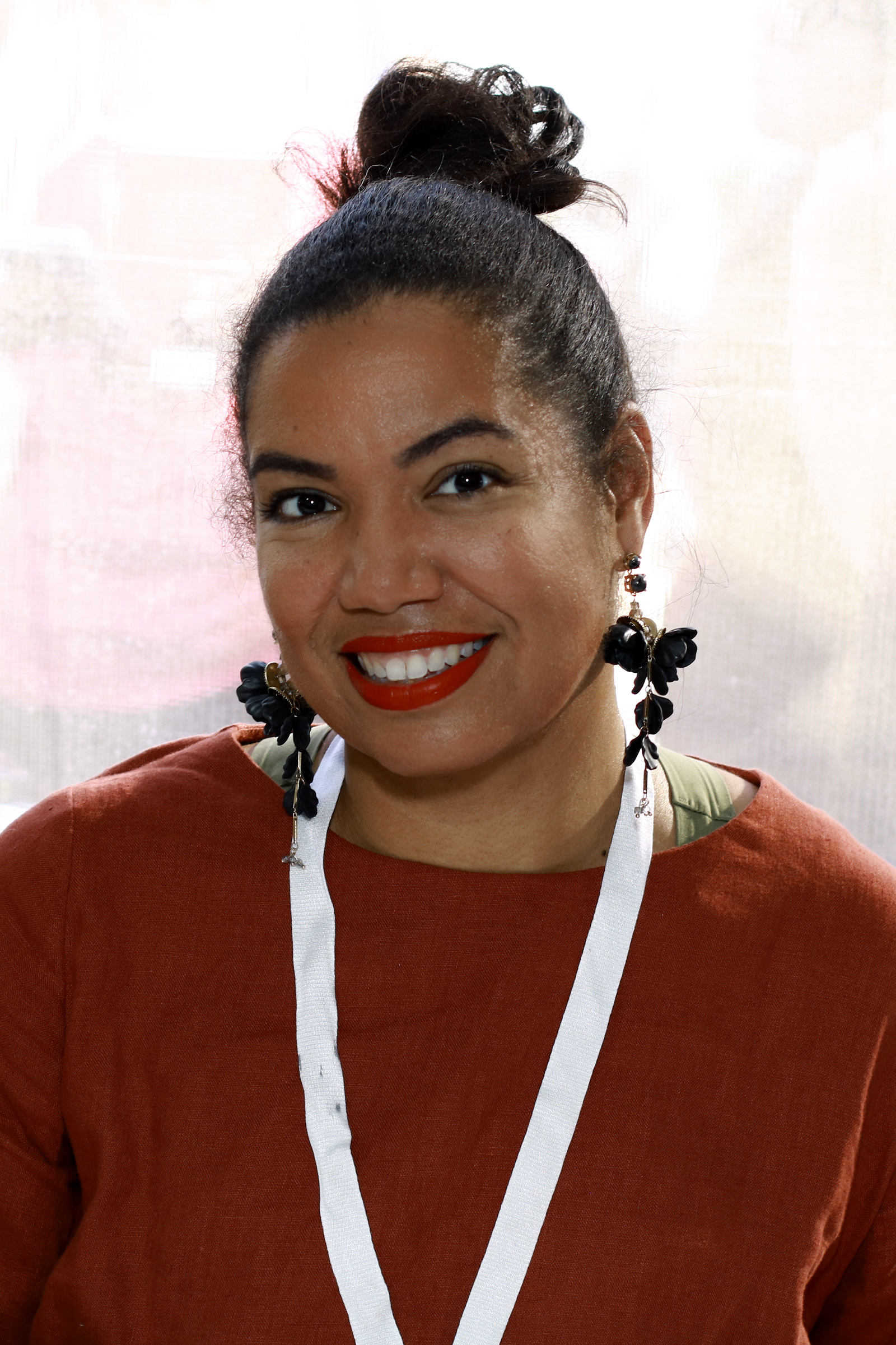
- Elle at the 2024 Texas Book Festival.
- Education: Belhaven University (BFA)
- Occupation: Writer
- Writing career
- Language: English
- Genres: Young Adult Fiction, Middle Grade
- Notable works: Wings of Ebony duology (2020–2022); The Little Mermaid: Against the Tide (2023)

J. Elle is an author of children's and young adult fiction.

== Early life ==
Elle grew up in Third Ward neighborhood of Houston. She received a Bachelor of Journalism from University of Texas, Austin, and a Master of Arts in Educational Admin and Human Development from George Washington University. She has worked as a preschool, middle school, and high school educator. Elle is Black.

== Writing career ==
Elle's young adult fantasy novel Wings of Ebony (2020), the first book in a duology of the same name, was a New York Times bestseller. The Third Ward neighborhood where she grew up was the model for the East Row neighborhood in the book. Wings of Ebony was nominated for an NAACP Image Award for Outstanding Literary Work for Youth/Teens in 2022. Daniel Jose Older reviewed the book on National Public Radio. It was the 2022 First Novelist honor book of the Black Caucus of the American Library Association. Kirkus Reviews wrote, "debut author Elle’s characters shine with determination and heart". Publishers Weekly wrote that it was a "poignant debut" and that "Elle relentlessly highlights the ancestral trauma of genocide, colonialism, and institutional racism that Black people endure to this day". School Library Journal wrote that it was a "high-stakes debut" and "#BlackGirlMagic at its most earnest, teaching readers that strength is nothing to apologize for".

Ashes of Gold (2022), the second book in the Wings of Ebony duology, received a starred review from Kirkus Reviews, which wrote, "Elle’s thrilling conclusion to the Wings of Ebony duology delivers a hefty punch".

Elle's A Taste of Magic (2022) was called a "fast-paced, heartfelt story deliciously blends realism with the whimsy of the mystical" by Kirkus Reviews. Elle has said that her grandmother was an inspiration for the book. Publishers Weekly called it a "whimsical culinary fantasy" and praised Elle for "a story of familial love and friendship and tops it with pure culinary enthusiasm". Booklist referred to it as a "warm food- and family-centered story".

In 2023, Elle's novelization of Disney's live-action version of The Little Mermaid (2023) was published. In 2023, she released the first book in her new trilogy, House of Marionne, which was an instant New York Times bestseller, USA TODAY bestseller, and Sunday Times bestseller.

In May 2024, she received the Outstanding Young Texas Ex Award from the Alumni Association of the University of Texas. Later that year, in October, she released the second book in her House of Marionne trilogy, Shadows of Perl, which also became a USA TODAY bestseller.

== Works ==
- A Taste of Magic. Bloomsbury. 2022. ISBN 978-1-5476-0671-9.
- The Little Mermaid: Against the Tide. Disney Press. 2023. ISBN 9781368077224.
- House of Marionne. Penguin Random House. 2023. ISBN 9780593527702.
- Shadows of Perl. Penguin Random House. 2024. ISBN 9780593527733.

=== Wings of Ebony duology ===
- Wings of Ebony. Simon & Schuster. 2020. ISBN 978-1-5344-7068-2.
- Ashes of Gold. Simon & Schuster. 2022. ISBN 978-1-5344-7070-5.
