= Third Ward, Houston =

Neighborhood in Houston, Texas

Coordinates: 29.73°N 95.36°W

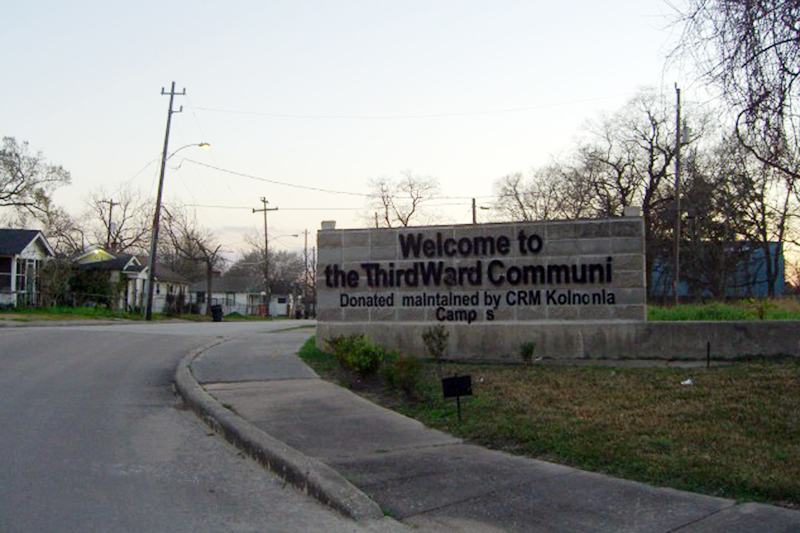
A sign indicating Houston's Third Ward

Third Ward is an area of Houston, Texas, United States which evolved from one of the six historic wards of the same name. It is located in the southeast Houston management district.

Third Ward, located inside the 610 Loop is immediately southeast of Downtown Houston and to the east of the Texas Medical Center. The ward became the center of Houston's African-American community. Third Ward is nicknamed "The Tre".

Robert D. Bullard, a sociologist teaching at Texas Southern University, stated that Third Ward is "the city's most diverse black neighborhood and a microcosm of the larger black Houston community."

== History ==
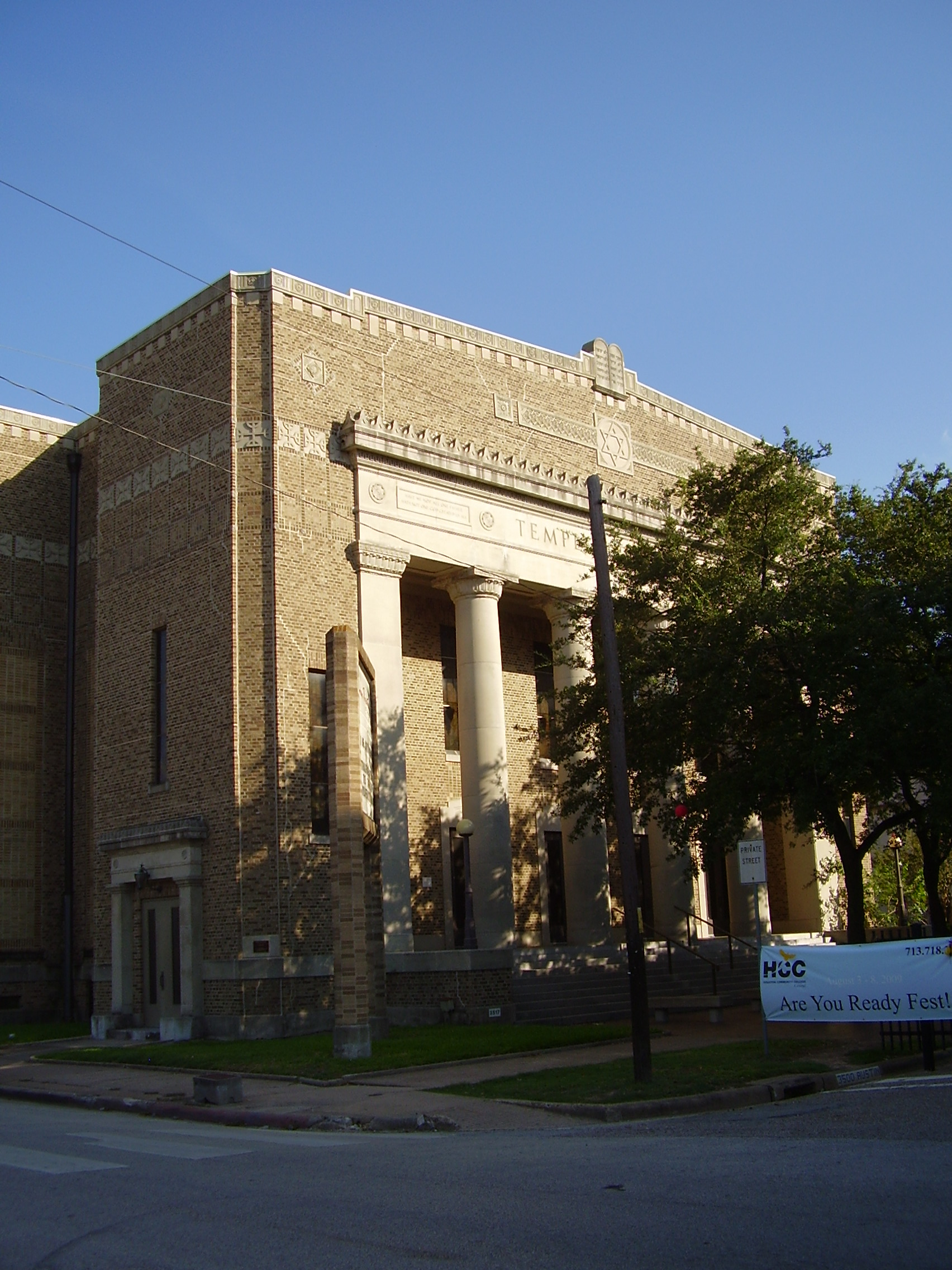
Temple Beth Israel, now the Heinen Theater, was a part of Third Ward.

Soon after the 1836 establishment of Houston, the City Council established four wards as political subdivisions of the city. The original Third Ward district extended south of Congress Street and east of Main Street and ended at the north shore of the Brays Bayou; what was then the district includes what is today portions of Downtown Houston and Midtown Houston in addition to residential African-American area currently identified as Third Ward, which is located southeast of Downtown Houston. As of 2003 the usage of the land within the boundaries of the historic Third Ward is more diverse than the land usage in the current Third Ward.

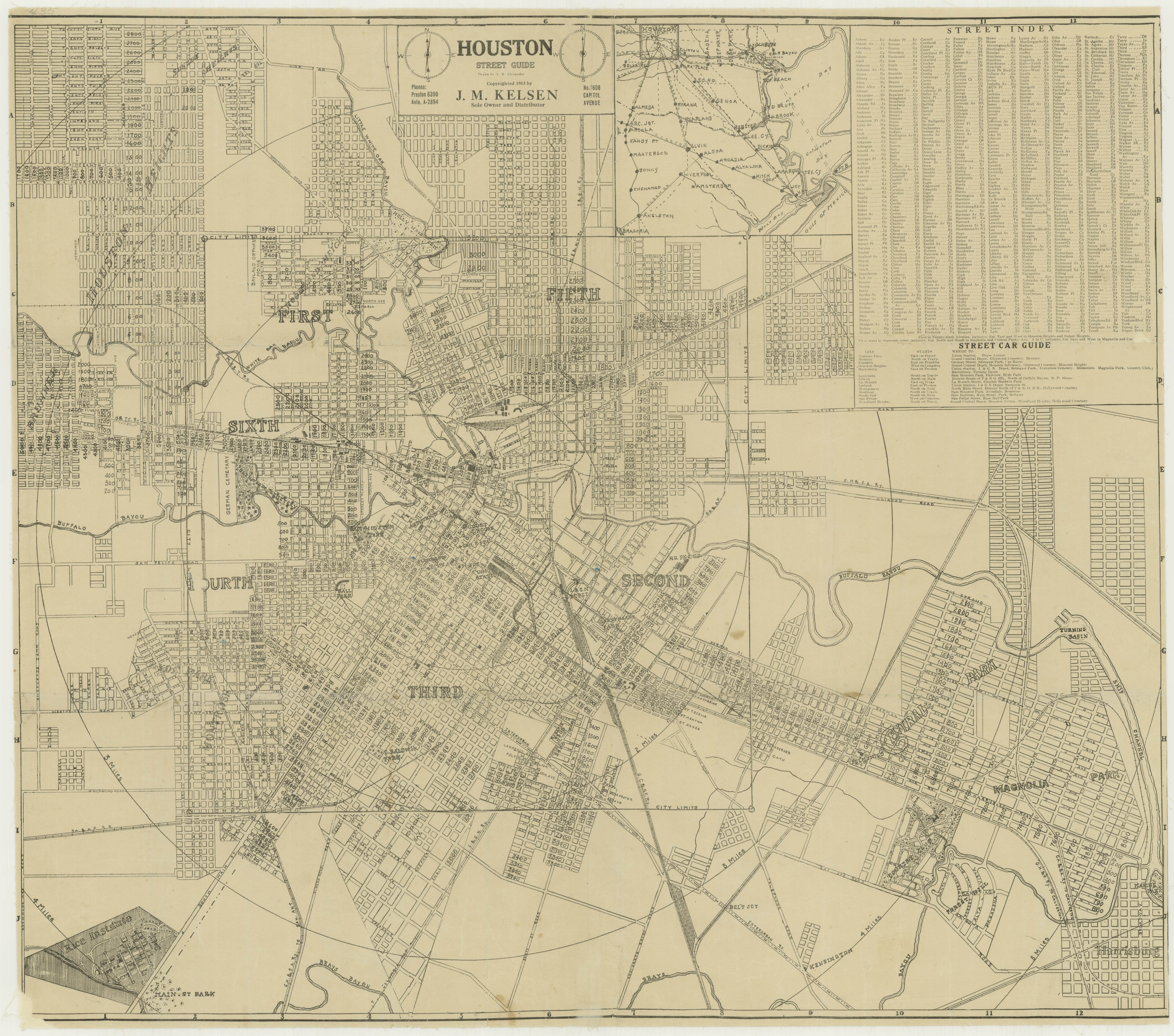
1913 map of the six wards of Houston

In the 1800s much of what was Third Ward, the present-day east side of Downtown Houston, was what Stephen Fox, an architectural historian who lectured at Rice University, referred to as "the elite neighborhood of late 19th-century Houston." Ralph Bivins of the Houston Chronicle said that Fox said that area was "a silk-stocking neighborhood of Victorian-era homes." Bivins said that the construction of Union Station, which occurred around 1910, caused the "residential character" of the area to "deteriorate." Hotels opened in the area to service travelers. Afterwards, according to Bivins, the area "began a long downward slide toward the skid row of the 1990s" and the hotels were changed into flophouses. Passenger trains stopped going to Union Station. The City of Houston abolished the ward system in the early 1900s, but the name "Third Ward" was continued to be used to refer to the territory that it used to cover.

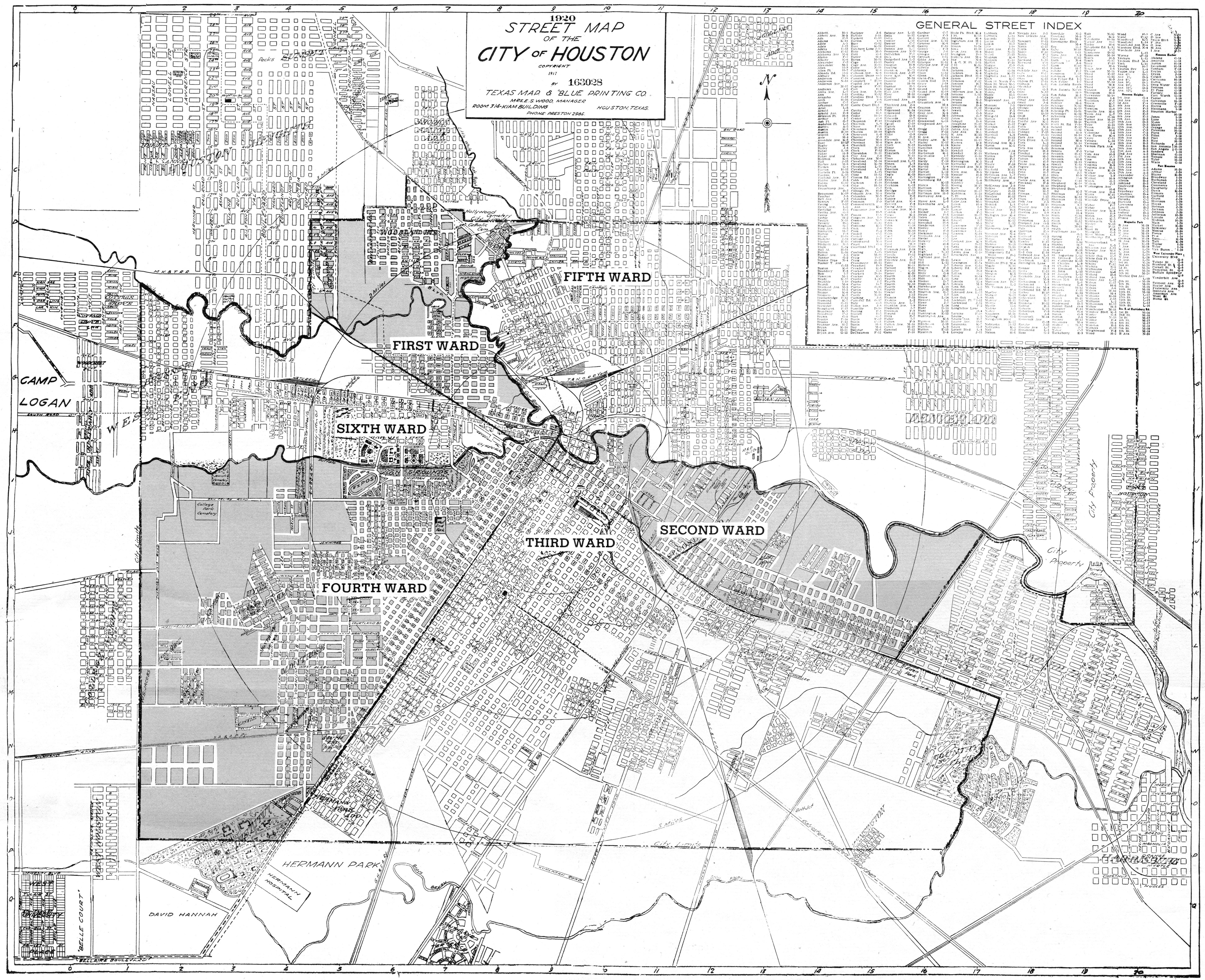
1920 map of the six wards of Houston

Historically, Whites lived in the southern part of Third Ward, while African Americans were economically segregated and lived north of Truxillo Street. By the 1930s the White and Black populations of Third Ward were about even. After World War II White residents and the Temple Beth Israel moved from Third Ward to newly developed suburbs on the southwest side, and Third Ward became mostly African-American. In the post-World War II period a large number of black migrants, many of them from Louisiana and some from East Texas and other areas in the Deep South, settled in Third Ward. The community became characterized by poverty since many of these migrants were unable to get non-menial jobs. In the era of racial segregation, Almeda Road, a road located in Third Ward area that at that time served as a corridor to Downtown Houston, was a busy commercial corridor. The construction of Interstate 45 in the 1950s separated portions of the historic Third Ward from the rest of Third Ward and brought those portions into Downtown.

The People's Party II, a community activist organization that eventually became the Houston Chapter of the Black Panther Party was originally led by Carl Hampton - a charismatic speaker who organized the PPII at 2800 Dowling Street in the spring of 1970 to address police brutality and corruption towards Black and Brown people in the community. Hampton died after being shot without provocation by police from a top of a church on July 26, 1970. J. R. Gonzales of the Houston Chronicle stated that there were disputes between southern whites and blacks regarding the nature of Hampton's death. Carl Hampton's contribution to Third Ward Community was the Rainbow Coalition that included The MAYO group - a Mexican community activist group - and The John Brown Revolutionary League, a group of white community activists. These groups worked together to bring about positive changes in their working class communities by supporting each other's "survival" programs. Programs included free childcare, free food giveaway, free fumigation for poor people, assisting the elderly in the community and free sickle cell anemia testing. Charles Boko Freeman became the PPII/local Black Panther Party Chairman. Party activity continued until membership dropped in late 1974 and early 1975 due to constant police repression.

In the 1960s and 1970s many families in Third Ward relocated to racially integrated suburbs; racial integration allowed many Blacks to move to the suburbs, therefore Third Ward lost some of its population with decades of neglect and economic traffic. Despite the relocations the Almeda Road commercial corridor remained busy. Kent Hadnot, the executive director of Third Ward Redevelopment Council, said in a 2000 Houston Press article that blockbusting beginning in the 1970s began to drive homeowners and business owners away from the Third Ward and into suburbs including Missouri City. The construction of Texas State Highway 288, which offered a quicker alternative into Downtown, caused Almeda Road's commercial properties to decline. In addition 288's construction had divided existing parts of Third Ward. Many children of Third Ward area business owners, educated in universities, had no desire to work in their parents' businesses, reducing the employee base of the Third Ward businesses. The 1980s oil bust hurt the economy of Third Ward and the nearby Almeda Road commercial corridor.

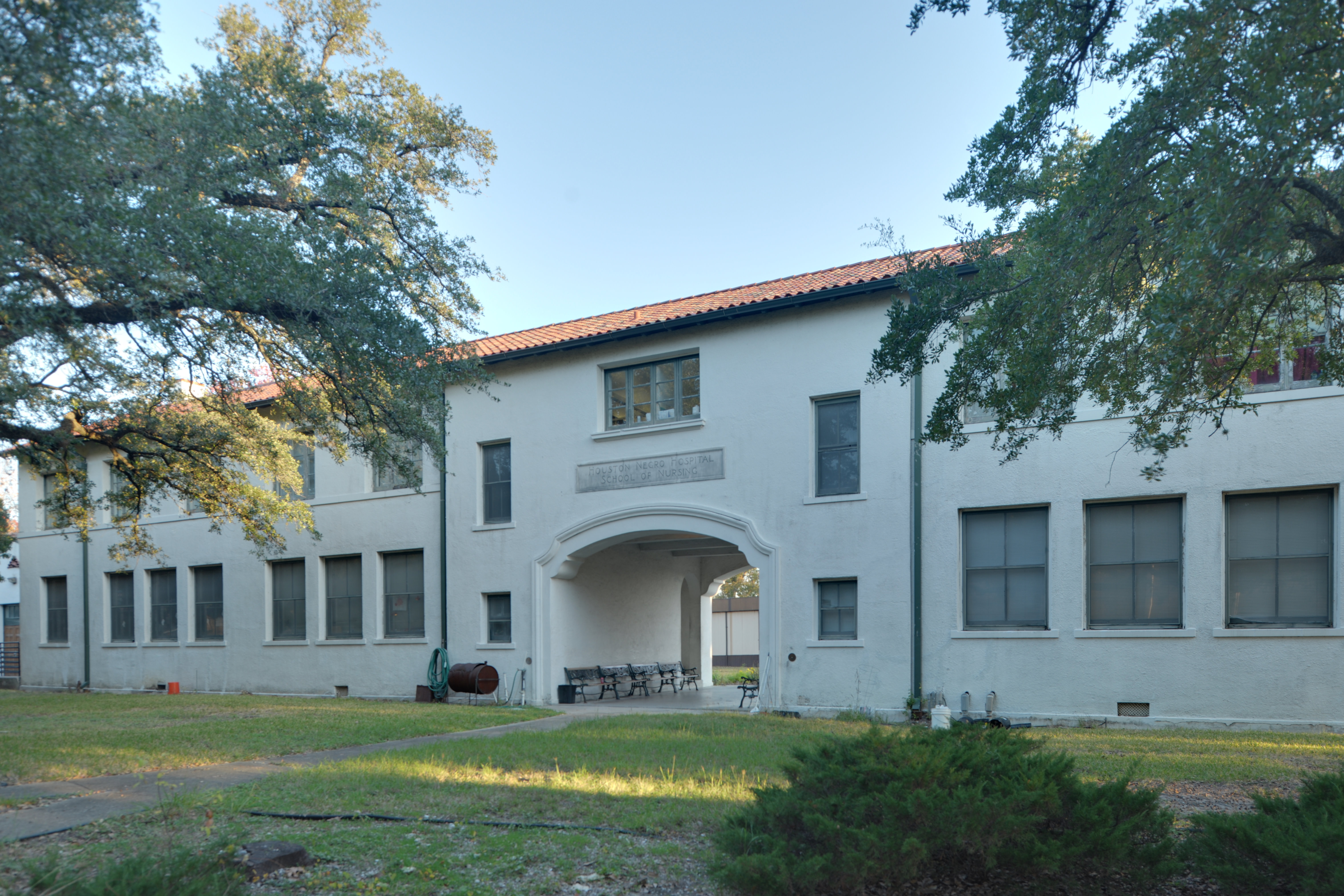
Houston Negro Hospital School of Nursing

From the 1980 U.S. Census to the 1990 Census, many African Americans left traditional African-American neighborhoods such as Third Ward and went into areas in Southwest Houston.

In 1987 Dr. Joyce Williams, the chairperson of the Southeast Area Council, an organization within the Mayor's Citizens Assistance Council, said that her group stopped referring to the area as "Third Ward." The practice became official on Wednesday June 3, 1987. The group itself was formerly named Third Ward Area Council. Williams said "The city has become a cosmopolitan city. The term 'ward' is stagnant, unsophisticated, and places areas in isolation." Williams hoped that fellow Houstonians would also stop referring to sections of the city as "wards." Kim Cobb of the Houston Chronicle explained that "She's particularly concerned about the Riverside-MacGregor area near the Medical Center that her group represents. She thinks the term "Third Ward" implies an economic division that will get in the way of the benefits that will come to the rest of the city from the opening of the George Brown Convention Center." Betty Chapman, a historian, said in 2007 "The wards haven’t had any real meaning since 1905. But people are very interested in them. They’re an important part of our history."

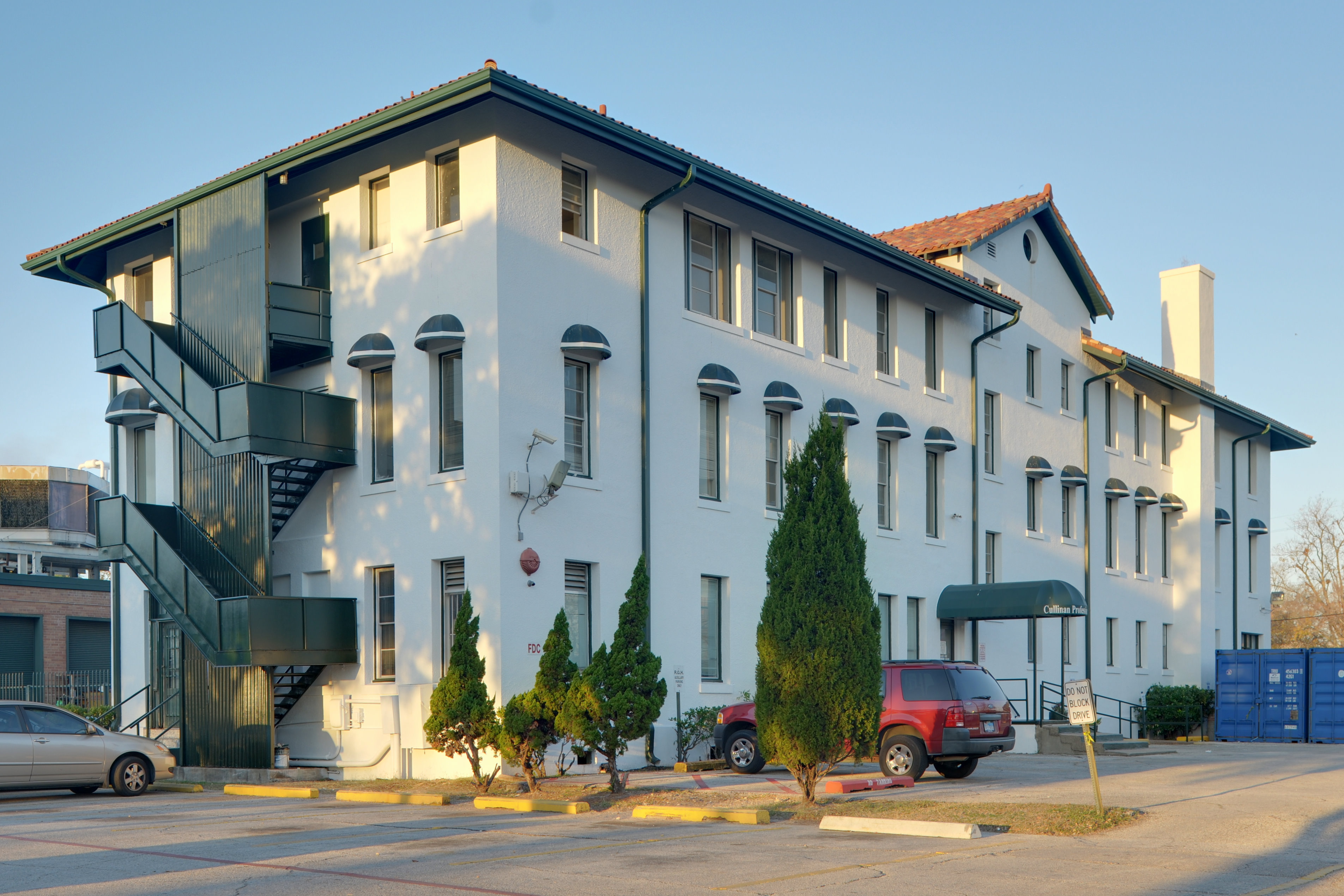
Houston Negro Hospital

In 1998, a report by Third Ward Redevelopment Council concluded that the area had 55,000 residents. In addition, the report concluded that area shoppers and residents spend $345 million outside of the Third Ward per year; the residents and shoppers spend the money in other areas such as The Galleria, Meyerland, Pearland, Rice Village, and Sharpstown. By 2000 younger business owners began to increase activity in the Almeda Road corridor. Old Spanish Trail/Almeda TIRZ funded area businesses with collected property taxes and offered incentives to prospective business owners. The redevelopment council offered prospective entrepreneurs lists of contacts and other forms of assistance. Between 1990 and 2000 the Hispanic population of Third Ward increased by between 5 and 10 percent as Hispanics in the Houston area moved into majority black neighborhoods. In the same period the black population of the area declined by 1,272 as majority African-American neighborhoods in Houston had declines in their black populations. In 2002 the City of Houston planned to build its Olympic village in Third Ward if its bid for the 2012 Olympic Games was successful; many Third Ward residents and activists stated that they needed to receive some form of economic benefit from the proposed facilities. Houston's bid was rejected later that year.

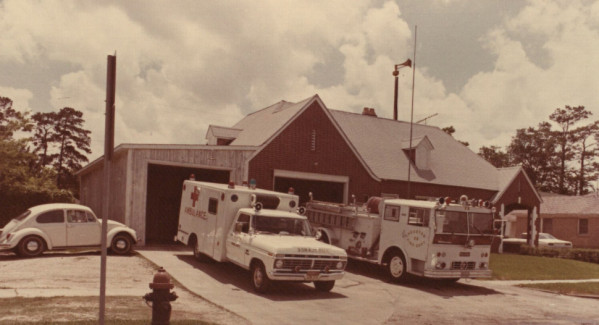
Fire Station 25, 1976

Around 1996 many artists began moving into Third Ward. In 2011 Danyahel Norris, a Third Ward resident and a legal research instructor and attorney at Texas Southern University, said that he observed the first sign of gentrification in Third Ward in 2000, when a crack house was converted into a high-end residence. Some activists in Third Ward area created campaigns encouraging area residents to not sell their homes to new residents to avoid gentrification and re-development. By 2006 many townhouses appeared in the area across the freeway from the Third Ward, with childless couples, empty nesters, and yuppies occupying the movements. Garnet Coleman—a state representative from the area—expressed his opposition to gentrification and a desire to keep the original residents in the neighborhood. Coleman had some control over the Midtown Tax Increment Financing District, which bought land in Third Ward and enacted deeds restricting what may be done with the land, so that the land could indefinitely be used to house low income residents. In 2009, Coleman said "We learned a lot from the debacle in the Fourth Ward. So it would be stupid not to respond to the negative byproducts of rapid development. We want to find people who will make this community better by becoming part of its fabric, not by changing its fabric." In 2010 Norris published an article in the Thurgood Marshall Law Review stating how existing Third Ward residents could continue to keep their properties, including enforcing deed restrictions; because the City of Houston does not have zoning, many Houston neighborhoods use deed restrictions to maintain their existing setups and atmospheres.

In 2010 Paul Knight of the Houston Press wrote that from 2000 to 2010, "while other areas of the inner city have redeveloped dramatically in the last decade," citing the changes in the Fourth Ward, "Third Ward has, except for a few pockets, remained unchanged." By 2016 the western Third Ward was undergoing new development, influenced by Midtown to the west, while many demolitions occurred in the northeast Third Ward. In a ten-year period ending in 2016 the rate of construction was lower than the Harris County average while the rate of demolition in the Third Ward was higher than the county average.

By 2017, gentrification had become highly noticeable and more non-Black people had gradually moved into Greater Third Ward drawn by its proximity to popular destinations in Houston; the white population increased by 100% from 2007 to 2017, and the black population decreased by 10%. The dawn of a new decade in 2020 saw more changes as longtime residents pushed back against rising housing costs and gentrification efforts changing the face of iconic structures such as the historic Sears building to pave way for a $100M innovation called The Ion. By 2020, Third Ward's black population dropped to 45% from 71% in 2010, while the white population jumped 170% from 2010 to 2020. Also, Third Ward's median home price and average rent price jumped significantly from 2010 to 2020.

== Layout ==
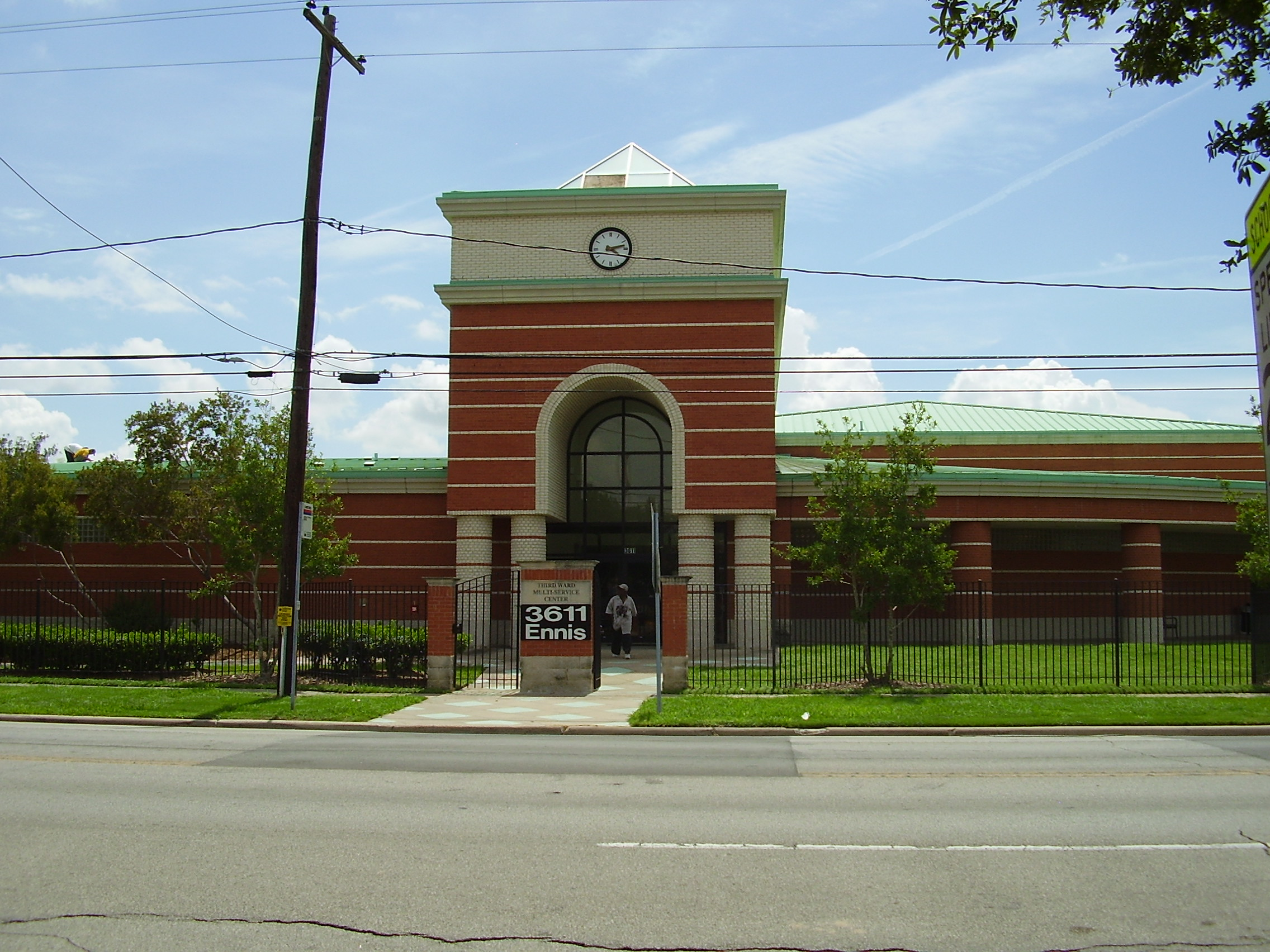
Third Ward Multi-Service Center

Third Ward is immediately north of North MacGregor Boulevard and South MacGregor Boulevard. The area is northeast of the Texas Medical Center, Hermann Park, and the Houston Museum District, which are west of Texas State Highway 288. It is in close proximity to Downtown Houston.

=== Boundaries ===
Roger Wood, author of Down in Houston: Bayou City Blues, said that "determining exactly where to draw" the boundaries of Third Ward "is not easily done" due to the variety of opinions about what Third Ward is. The Third Ward Redevelopment Council has a defined set of boundaries, with the Houston Belt & Terminal Railroad as the eastern boundary of Third Ward area. Joe "Guitar" Hughes, a local musician, stated that Third Ward's cultural southern boundary was Truxillo Street, regardless of any technical map divisions, due to the cultural division between the shotgun shack areas to the north and the houses to the south. According to Hughes, the eastern boundary is a low rent group of houses near Texas Southern University that he refers to as "Sugar Hill." Wood says that among area musicians, Third Ward's boundaries are usually thought of as extending southward from the junction of Interstate 45 (Gulf Freeway) and Interstate 69/U.S. Route 59 (Southwest Freeway) to the Brays Bayou, with Main Street forming the western boundary.

The definitions of Third Ward as of 2004 differ from the definition of the historical Third Ward political entity. The political district had the following boundaries: Congress Street, Main Street, and the city limits to the east and south. Will Howard, an assistant manager of the Texas and local history department of the Houston Public Library, said in 2004 "They are cultural entities today, not legal entities, and like any culture, they are almost obligated to change." Jeannie Kever of the Houston Chronicle said "That evolution allows people to designate the area around Texas Southern University Third Ward, for example, even though the city limits stopped far short of there in the early 1900s."

Katharine Shilcutt of the Houston Press said that Third Ward is southwest of Interstate 45, southeast of Interstate 69/U.S. Route 59/Texas State Highway 288, north of Blodgett and Wheeler, and west of Texas State Highway 5/Calhoun. Shilcutt said that in her article on the best restaurants on the Third Ward, due to historical reasons she adjusted the western boundary to Almeda Road and the southern boundary down to MacGregor Way.

In the era of de jure segregation, Alabama Street was the dividing line between the black and white areas.

=== Composition ===
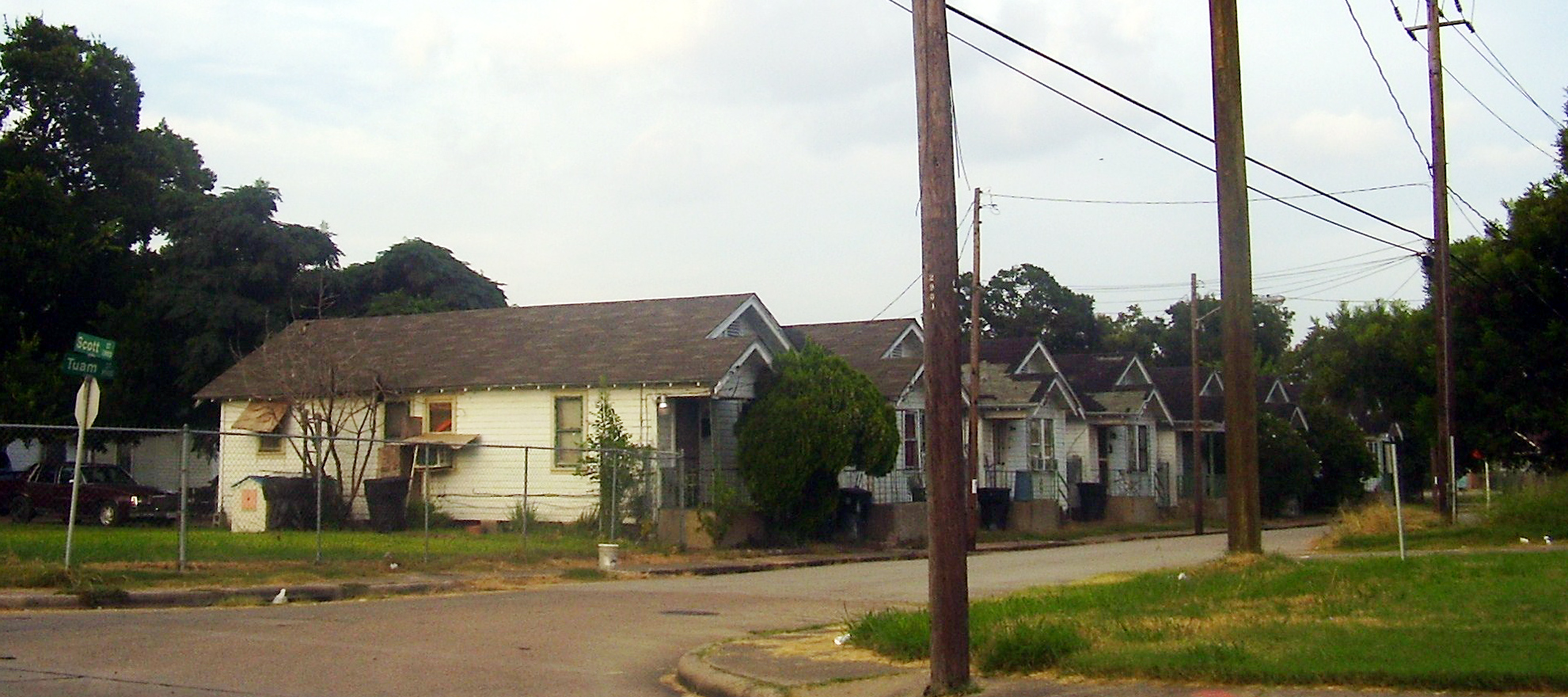
The portion of Third Ward north of Truxillo has many shotgun shacks.

In 1995 T. R. Witcher of the Houston Press reported that the Third Ward, as defined by Third Ward Redevelopment Council, "may be the most variegated community in Houston." He said the area west of Texas Southern University is "the heart of the Third Ward," has "blocks of sturdy, well-tended brick houses," and is the "home" of a "diminished but still-viable base of middle-class and working-class homeowners and renters" of the area. The brick houses, south of Truxillo are larger and, in the words of Roger Wood, author of Down in Houston: Bayou City Blues, "nicer" than the housing stock north of Truxillo. Throughout the history of Third Ward, African Americans gradually occupied the brick houses. As of 2003 the brick houses are in varying conditions; Woods said that some are "beautifully renovated," some are "respectfully maintained," and some are "severely neglected."

Witcher described the northern part of Third Ward, which in his view "more than any other in Third Ward, call to mind the word "ghetto," Houston-style," as having "rows of shotgun shacks, worn frame houses and fraying apartments" owned by absentee landlords. The section included crime, families affected by welfare dependency, unemployment, and proliferation of recreational drugs. In the summer residents of that area who wanted to cool down from the summer heat sat on porches and visited friends on the streets. The Third Ward area included many churches of varying sizes; some churches still attracted members who lived in Missouri City and other suburbs. The shotgun shacks, located north of Truxillo Street, are smaller and more cheaply built than the houses, and they have been historically occupied by working class African Americans. Some shotgun shacks have been continually occupied, and some shotgun shacks have been abandoned; some of the abandoned shotgun shacks have been boarded up.

Emancipation Avenue, renamed as such in 2017 and previously Dowling Street, has served as the main northeast to southeast artery of the Third Ward. The street intersects with Elgin, Holman, Southmore, and Wheeler. It was named after the Confederate soldier Dick Dowling. Roger Wood, author of Down in Houston: Bayou City Blues, said that the street is widely viewed as the center of Houston's blues music culture. Big Robert Smith, an area singer, called Dowling the "main street of black Houston." Witcher described the Dowling Street corridor, which once functioned as the main commercial area of Third Ward, as still having "many thriving enterprises" while its blocks have "an unsettling profusion of empty, overgrown lots and dilapidated structures."

As of 2004 Third Ward has the highest concentration of "you buy, we fry" fish restaurants in the City of Houston.

In 2013 Katharine Shilcutt of the Houston Press said that "Today, Third Ward possess a dynamic mix of old and new as the area slowly undergoes a slow gentrification process: beautiful brick homes abutting wonderfully divey restaurants like Chief Cajun Snack Shack, 80-year-old meat markets turned into vegan coffee shops, non-profit arts organizations such as Project Row Houses side-by-side with still-occupied row houses."

The Third Ward Redevelopment Council defines Hermann Park, the Museum District, and the TMC as being part of Third Ward. Witcher of the wrote in 1995 that these are "not the first places that come to mind when you say "Third Ward,"[...]".

== Demographics ==
Third Ward is a predominantly African-American community. As of 2011 over 13,000 people live in Third Ward. As of 2019, the area has gentrified rapidly with a surge in population, racial diversity, and cost of living.

The City of Houston-defined Greater Third Ward Super Neighborhood in 2015 had 14,295 residents. 67% were non-Hispanic black, 14% were Hispanics, 13% were non-Hispanic white, 5% were non-Hispanic Asians, and 1% was non-Hispanic other. In 2000 the super neighborhood had 15,463 residents. 79% were non-Hispanic black, 10% were Hispanic, 7% were non-Hispanic white, and 2% each were non-Hispanic Asians and others.

In 1870 29% of the African Americans in Houston lived in Third Ward. In 1910 the plurality now lived in Third Ward, with 32%.

== Government and infrastructure ==
=== Local government ===
The Houston Police Department's South Central Patrol Division, headquartered at 2022 St. Emanuel in the Third Ward, serves the neighborhood. HPD opened the South Central Police Station in 1986 when the Central Police Station, 61 Riesner, split and the 3rd Ward, the East End and the Medical Center became 10 District. 3rd Ward, had one of the highest crime and homicide rates in the City and the South Central Police Station was Chief Browns attempt to include the citizens in his "NOP" or Neighborhood Oriented Policing.

Fire and emergency medical services are provided by Houston Fire Department Station 25 Third Ward. The station is in Fire District 8. The station opened at the intersection of Blodgett and Velasco in 1928 and opened in its current location at Rosewood at Scott in 1979.

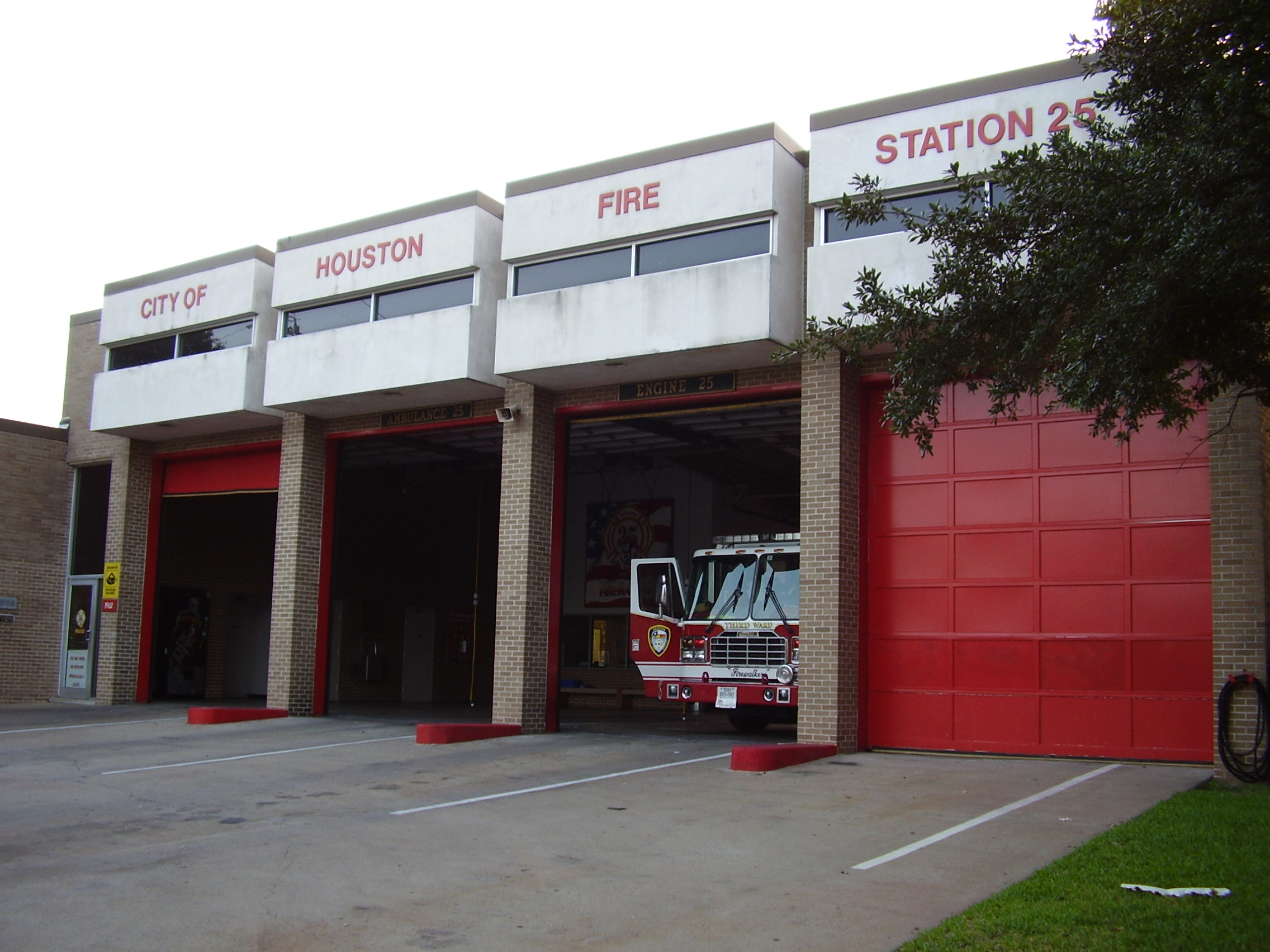
Fire Station 25 Third Ward

The city operates the Third Ward Multi-Service Center at 3611 Ennis Street. The city multi-service centers provide several services such as child care, programs for elderly residents, and rental space.

Third Ward is part of Houston City Council District D and, as of 2020, is represented by Dr. Carolyn Evans-Shabazz. In the 2000s Third Ward was split between districts D and I. In the 1990s it was split between districts D, E, and I.

In the 1991 Mayor of Houston election most Third Ward voters voted for Sylvester Turner. Turner had performed well in black neighborhoods throughout the city.

Housing Alliance HTX, formerly the Houston Housing Authority (HHA), operates Cuney Homes, a public housing complex. Cuney is across from Texas Southern University. It first opened in 1938, and it was modernized in 1997. It is named after Norris Wright Cuney, a Texas politician who assisted African-Americans during the Reconstruction.

Third Ward is Home, University Village, and Washington Terrace civic clubs serve part of the community, along with Emancipation Park Community Association (EPCA).. Also, Riverside Civic Association serves the neighboring Riverside Terrace area.

=== County, state, and federal representation ===
Third Ward is in Texas's 18th congressional district. Its representative as of 2008 is Sheila Jackson Lee.

== Crime ==
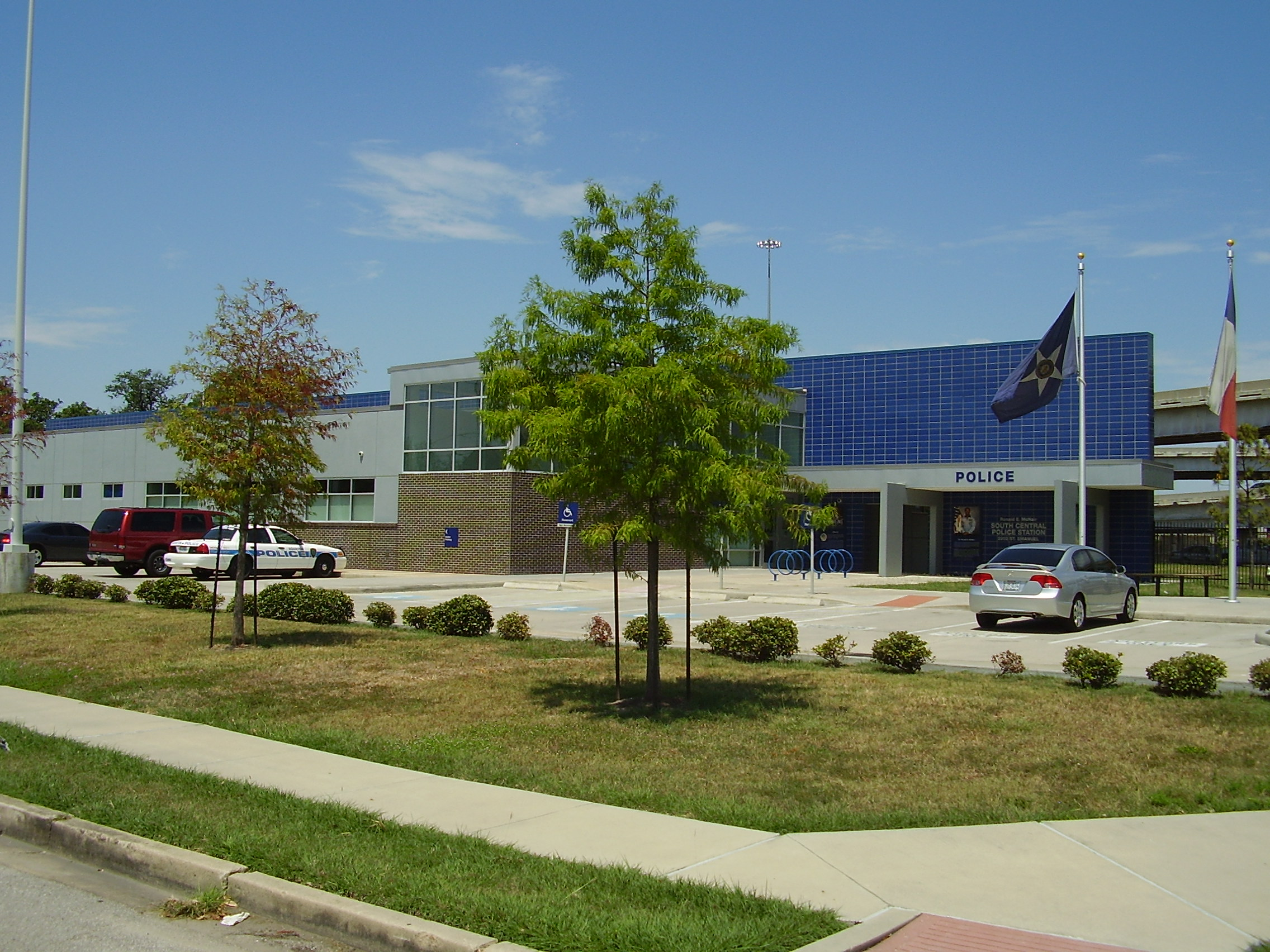
Ronald E. McNair South Central Police Station

Crime in Third Ward has been on a steady decline since 2006 and as of 2014. According to Houston Police Department's Uniform Crime Summary, there were approximately 1,428 total violent and non-violent crimes in 2006 in the Third Ward area patrolled by police beat 10H50. In 2013, there were approximately 991 violent and non-violent crimes in the area. In other words, there were 437 fewer crimes in 2013 than in 2006.

Some of the drops in crime rate may be related to the fact that the City of Houston, the University of Houston, and other private companies are cleaning up the area through construction. A prime example of this is the Campus Vue apartment complex off North MacGregor Way and Calhoun Road. Other companies like Fountain Residential Partners and Asset Campus Housing, who have decided to build off-campus boutique dorms in the area, are receiving tax abatement and government support for building in a high poverty area.

“We continually evaluate the types of crime that are affecting our community and adjust our patrol and investigation methods to address those issues,” said Bret Collier, UHPD lieutenant and chief of staff.

== Education ==
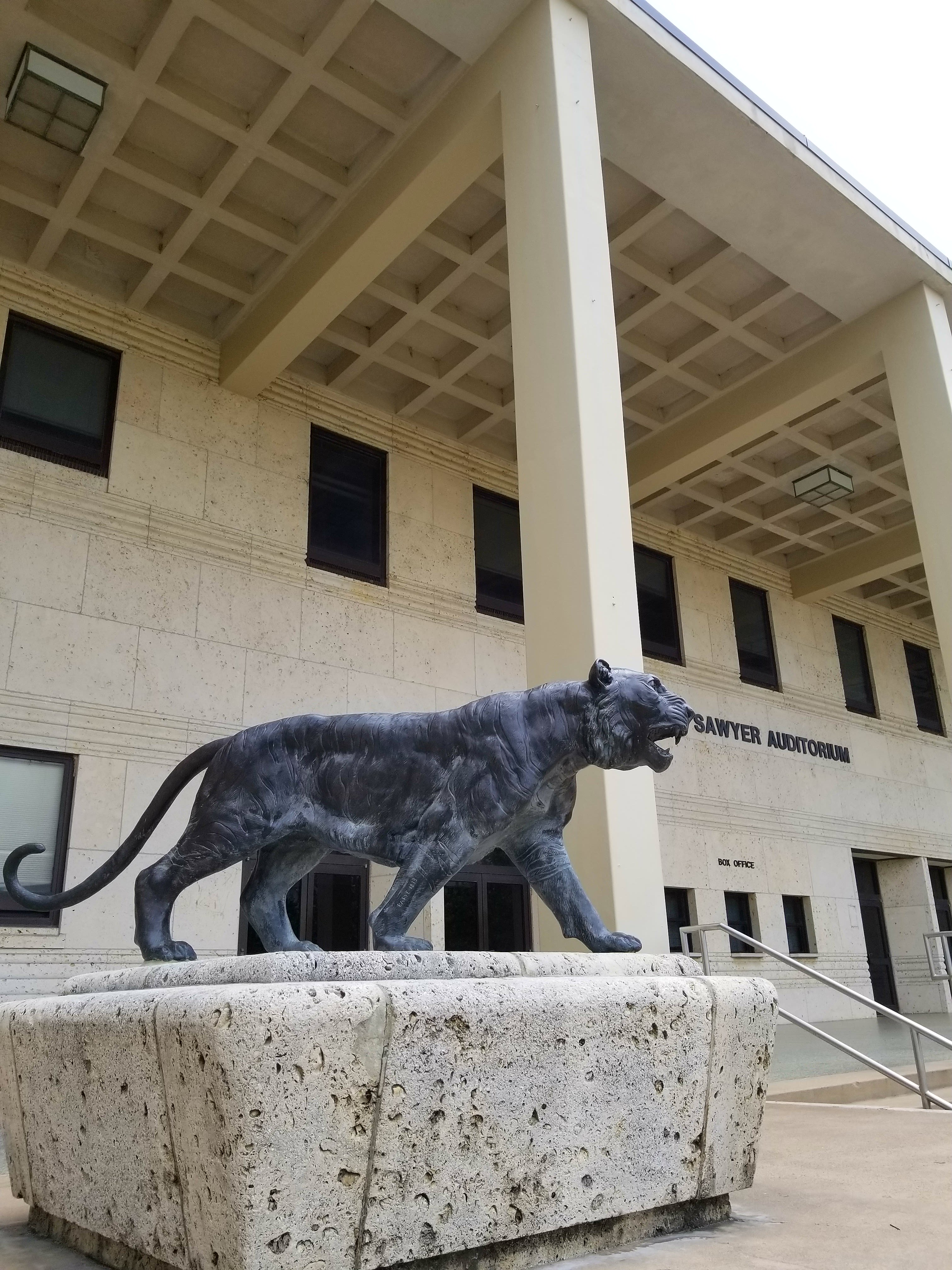
Texas Southern University

=== Colleges and universities ===
The historic Third Ward area has the campus of Texas Southern University. Waldivia Ardlaw of Cite: The Architecture + Design Review of Houston wrote that the university serves as "the cultural and community center of" the Third Ward area where it is located, in addition to being its university.

In addition, the University of Houston is located within proximity of the area which shares three main streets, namely Scott, the heart of Third Ward. The Redevelopment Council defines University of Houston as being part of the Third Ward.

The area previously housed the Houston Negro College of Nursing. The facility, as of 2003, now houses a charter school.

=== Primary and secondary schools ===
==== Public schools ====
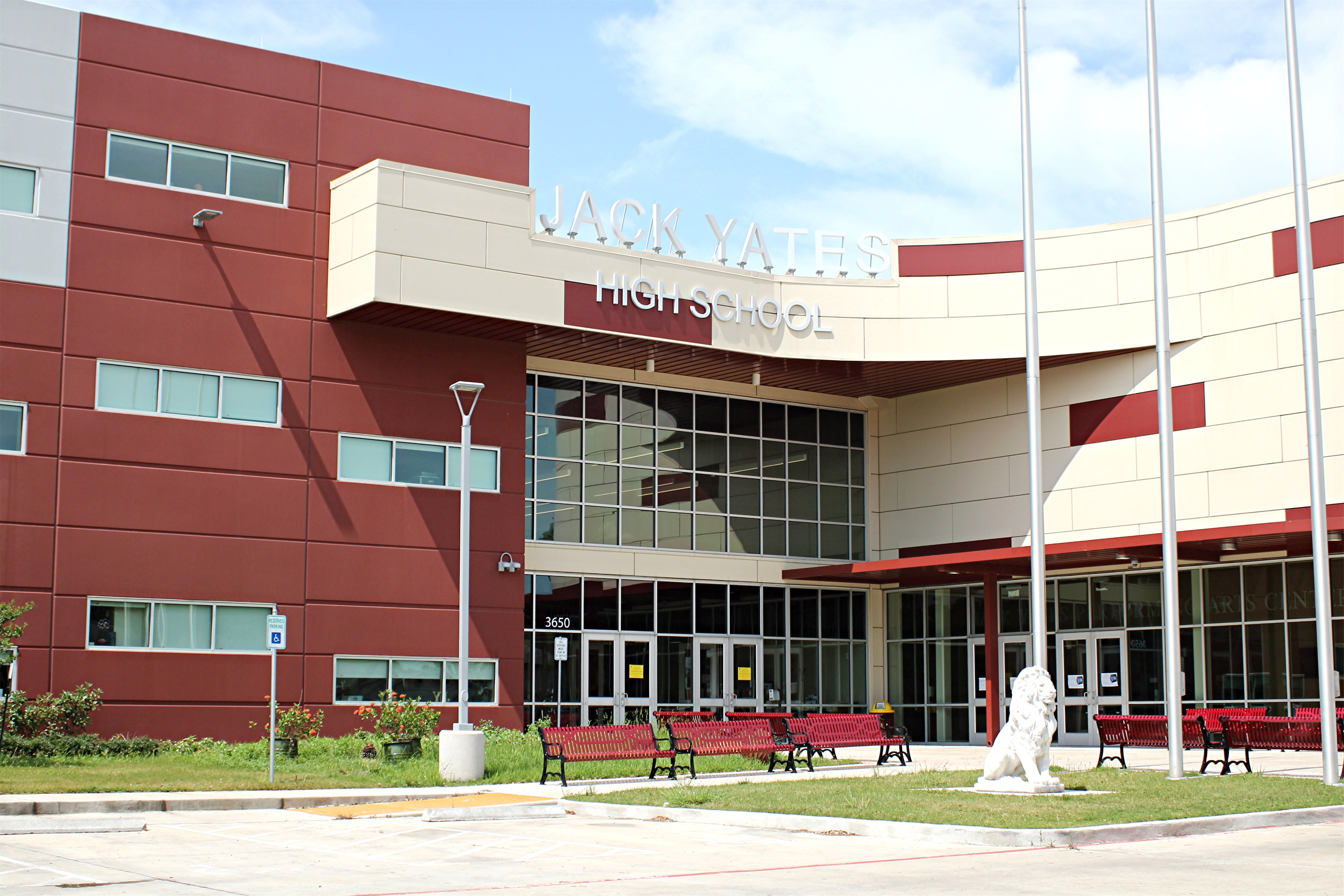
Yates High School

Area students attend schools in the Houston Independent School District. The community is within Trustee District IV, represented by Paula M. Harris as of 2009.

Elementary schools serving sections of the Third Ward include Blackshear, located in Third Ward; and Lockhart in Riverside Terrace. All area residents are zoned to Cullen Middle School and Yates High School. The Baylor College of Medicine Academy at Ryan, a magnet school, is located in the former Ryan Middle School building. Beginning in 2018 the school also serves as a boundary option for students zoned to Blackshear, Lockhart, and MacGregor elementary schools. The current Energy Institute High School campus opened in the Third Ward in 2018.

The Texas Southern University/Houston Independent School District Charter Laboratory School is in Cuney Homes. The building housing Young Women's College Preparatory Academy (which formerly had the Contemporary Learning Center) is in the Third Ward area. DeBakey High School is also in the Third Ward area. Energy Institute High School is in the former Dodson Elementary School in East Downtown, which once served the Third Ward.

The William A. Lawson Institute for Peace and Prosperity has a campus on Scott Street serving students from 6th to 8th grade at The Lawson Academy. The program has been led by Dr. Cheryl Lawson since 2006. The Lawson Academy is opening up an early childhood program at Regency Lofts serving 3 and 4 year olds starting fall of 2023.

===== History of public schools =====
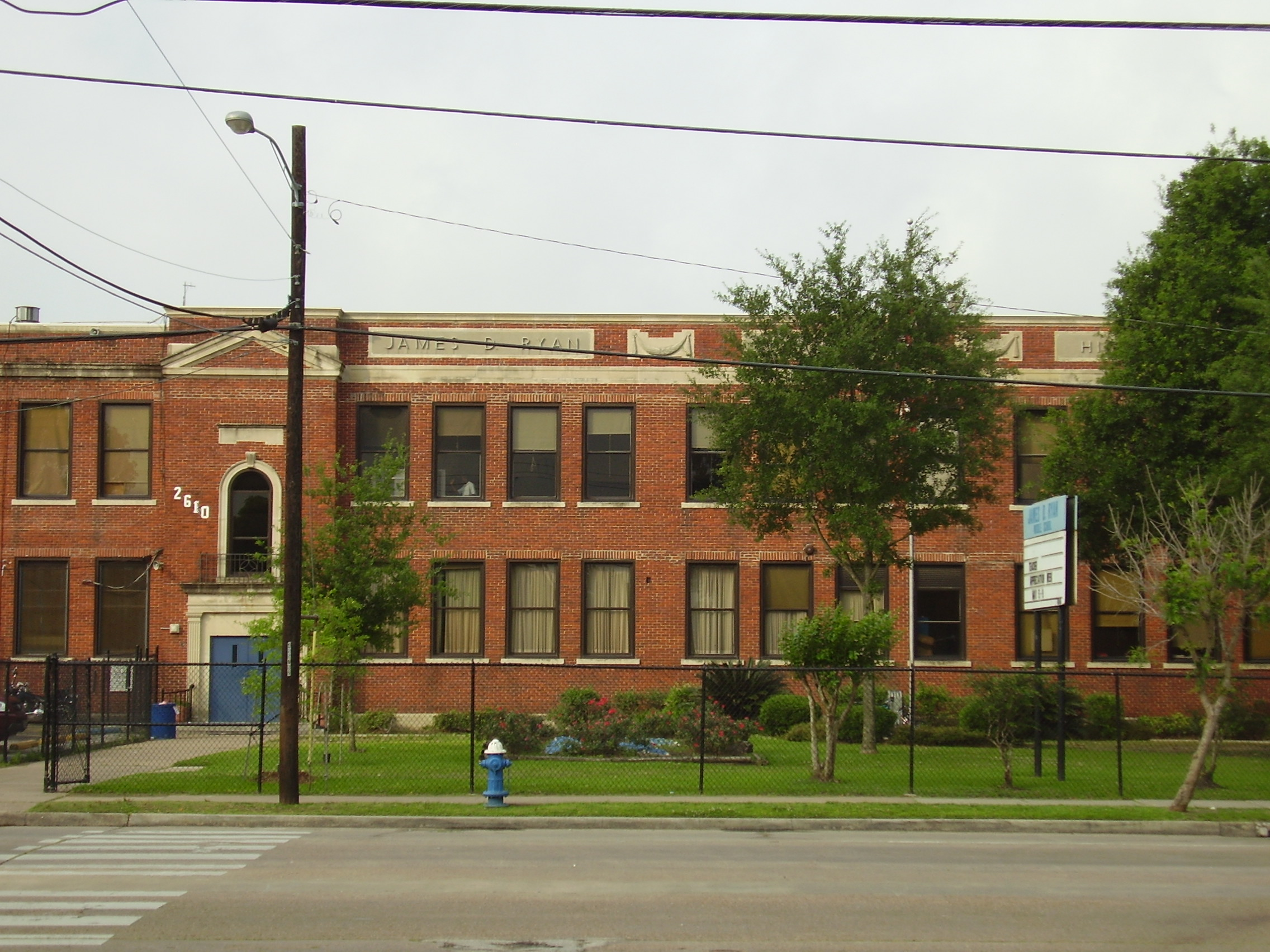
Ryan Middle School, the former location of Yates High School; the campus now houses the Baylor College of Medicine Academy at Ryan

Allan Turner of the Houston Chronicle said that the building now belonging to Ryan Middle School and formerly housing Yates High School served as an "educational anchor" for the Third Ward as many professionals in the Third Ward community such as educators, ministers, and lawyers received education in it.

Allen Elementary School opened as an elementary school for White people on February 1, 1907; back then the schools were segregated. Longfellow Junior High School, located at 2202 St. Emanuel Street, opened in 1913. Blackshear Elementary School opened in 1916. Bowie Elementary School opened in 1921. Johnston Middle School opened in 1925. Douglass opened in 1927. Bowie was renamed to Dodson Elementary School in 1945; for a period it was the second-largest Black elementary school in the Third Ward area.

In 1955 a new Allen elementary opened in another area not in proximity to the Third Ward. The former Allen campus became the Yates Annex, a school for Black 7th Graders meant to relieve Yates High School. In 1956 the campus was renamed J. Will Jones Elementary School, relieving Blackshear and Dunbar schools. In September 1959 the new Johnston opened in Meyerland and the old Johnston became Miller Junior High School. Blackshear received an expansion in 1960. In 1961 the Longfellow building began to house Dunbar Elementary School. Blackshear received expansions in 1965. In 1966 J. Will Jones received a 12 classroom annex. Contemporary Learning Center began in 1973 and moved into the former Miller building in 1976. Blackshear received an expansion in 1980. Dunbar closed in 1981. Kazi Shule, an HISD-affiliated charter school in the Third Ward serving grades 4-6, opened in 1996. The name in Swahili meant "The Working School".

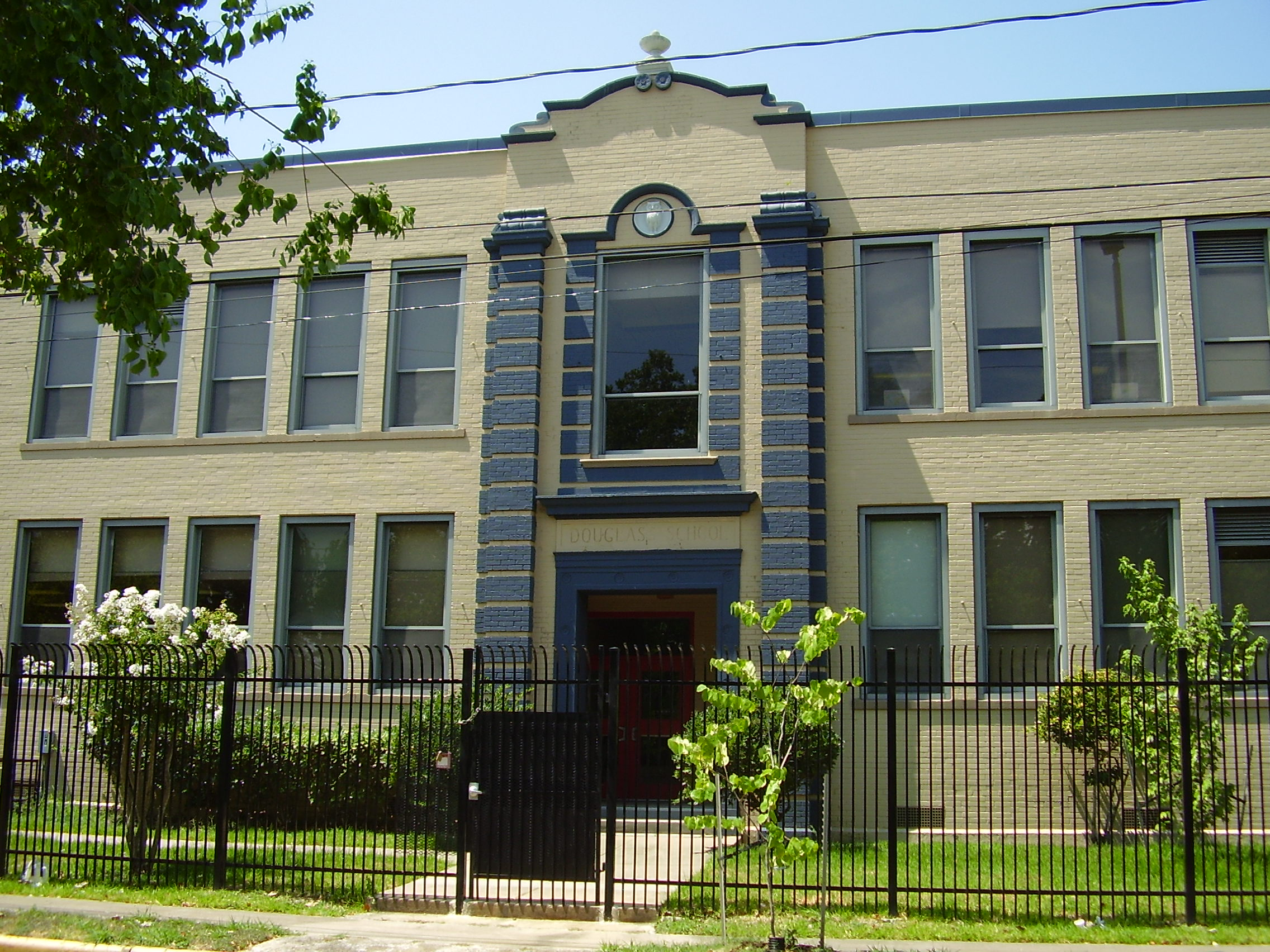
The former Douglass Elementary School, now Yellowstone Academy

Due to a decline in enrollment, HISD closed Douglass Elementary School in May 2005. In spring 2005 Douglass Elementary had 274 students and had faced a 26 percent decline in enrollment in a five-year period leading to 2005. After Hurricane Katrina struck in the fall of that year Douglass temporarily reopened to accommodate hurricane refugees. The HISD board voted 6-1 to lease Douglass to the KIPP program for one year, so the Katrina school could operate. KIPP opened NOW (New Orleans West) College Prep, a temporary K-8 school. In March 2006, HISD agreed to sell the Douglass Building to Yellowstone Academy. Yellowstone bid on the building for $1.9 million ($3034417.3 when adjusted for inflation).

In May 2006 Kazi Shule closed. The TSU/HISD Lab School opened in fall 2006. Before the start of the 2009-2010 school year J. Will Jones Elementary School, which was located in Midtown Houston and served sections of the Third Ward, was consolidated into Blackshear. During its final year of enrollment J. Will Jones had more students than Blackshear. Many J. Will Jones parents referred to Blackshear as "that prison school" and said that they will not send their children to Blackshear. Jones will house Houston Community College classes after its closure as a school. Turner Elementary School, a school in Riverside Terrace which served a section of the Third Ward, closed in 2009 and consolidated into Lockhart; by Spring 2011 a new campus was scheduled to be built on the Lockhart site. In March 2013 the HISD board voted to close Ryan Middle School and move all students into the zone of Cullen Middle School.

In 2013 the new Lockhart campus was to only have the Lockhart name, without combining "Lockhart" and "Turner", resulting in protests. HISD dedicated the campus, scheduled to house about 750 students, on Thursday August 22, 2013. The funds to build the campus originate from the 2007 bond.

In 2014 the Dodson school had about 445 students. That year, the HISD school board was to vote on whether to close Dodson Elementary. Terry Grier, the HISD superintendent, argued that Dodson needs to close so another school will be located there while its permanent facility is under construction. On Thursday March 13, 2014, the HISD board voted to close Dodson Elementary 5-4. The Montessori program will move to Blackshear Elementary. As part of rezoning for the 2014-2015 school year, all areas in the Third Ward previously under the Dodson zone were moved to the Blackshear zone.

==== Charter schools ====
The Lawson Academy, formerly WALIPP-TSU Preparatory Academy, is a charter middle school in Third Ward area. KIPP Houston Public Schools operates the KIPP Liberation College Preparatory School, a middle school charter school, in the Third Ward. KIPP operates KIPP Sunnyside High School near Sunnyside; that school has some students from the Third Ward. KIPP PEACE Elementary School, a KIPP school near the Third Ward, opened in 2011.

Pro-Vision Academy was established as an HISD-affiliated charter school for boys in 1995, originally occupying a campus in the Third Ward. After 2008 it moved to a new campus in Sunnyside.

==== Private schools ====
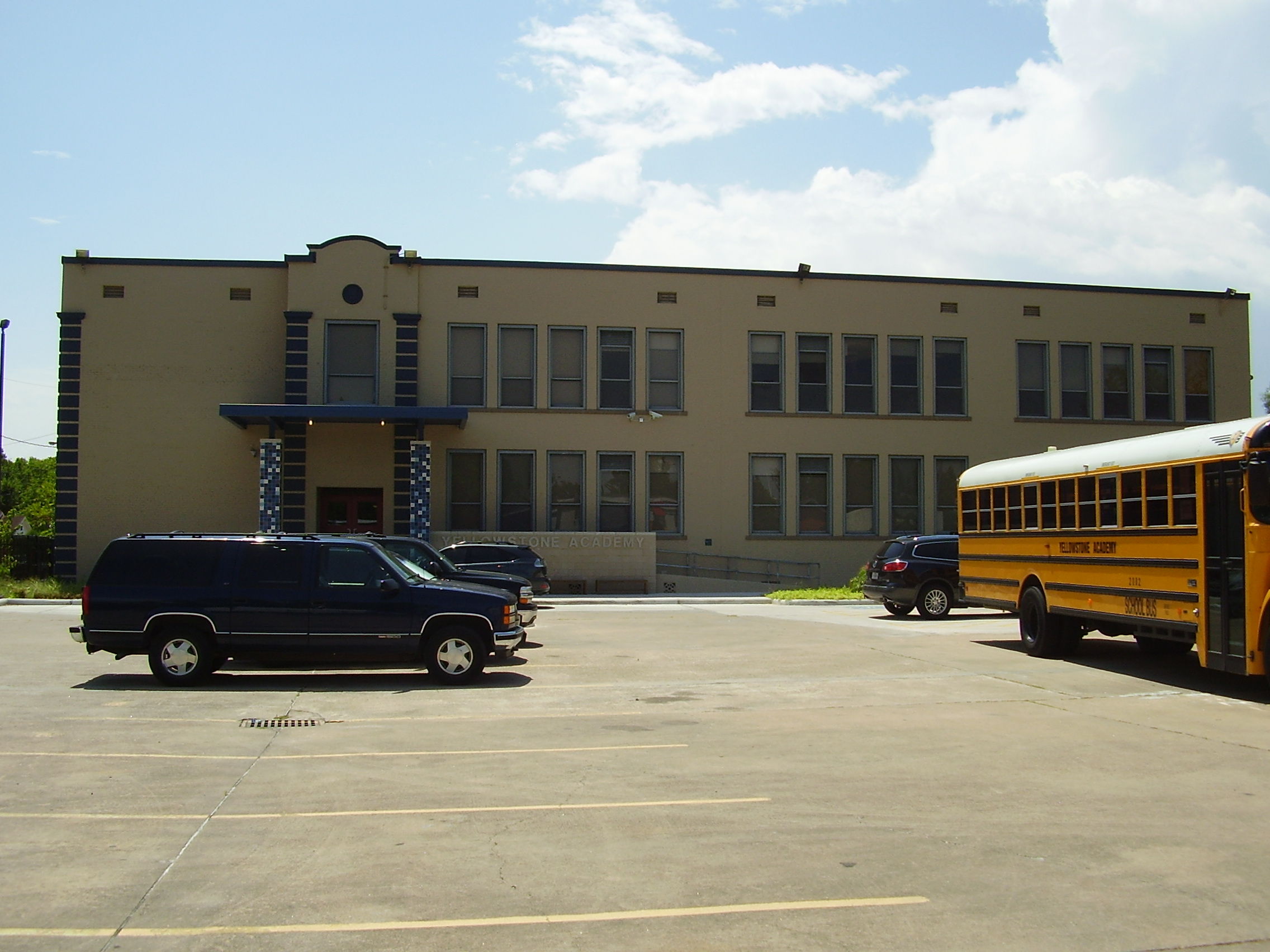
Yellowstone Academy, formerly Douglass Elementary School

The Roman Catholic Archdiocese of Houston operates Roman Catholic private schools in the area. St. Mary of the Purification School (kindergarten through grade five) and St. Peter the Apostle School, are in the area. St. Mary, located in the Riverside Terrace area, opened in a temporary building on September 8, 1930. The building was blessed on October 27. The Sisters of Dominic operated the school until it closed in 1967. The school reopened in 1980 as a Montessori school.

St. Peter the Apostle, before its closure, was a PreK-8 school. Its peak enrollment was about 600 students in the 1960s. Prior to 2009 St. Peter was a middle school with grades 6-8; that year St. Philip Neri School in the Sunnyside area merged into St. Peter, making it PK-8. In 2019 St. Peter the Apostle had 33 students; in May 2019 the Archdiocese announced that it was going to close. Debra Haney, the superintendent of schools of the Galveston-Houston diocese, stated that the enrollment decreased due to the proliferation of charter schools.

Yellowstone Academy, a Christian private school, is in the Third Ward. Yellowstone opened in August 2002, but in 2006 it agreed to purchase Douglass Elementary School from the Houston Independent School District. The Wheeler Avenue Christian Academy is a private school for students in kindergarten to fifth grade. The school operates under Wheeler Avenue Baptist Church located on Scott Street.

==== Gallery of schools ====
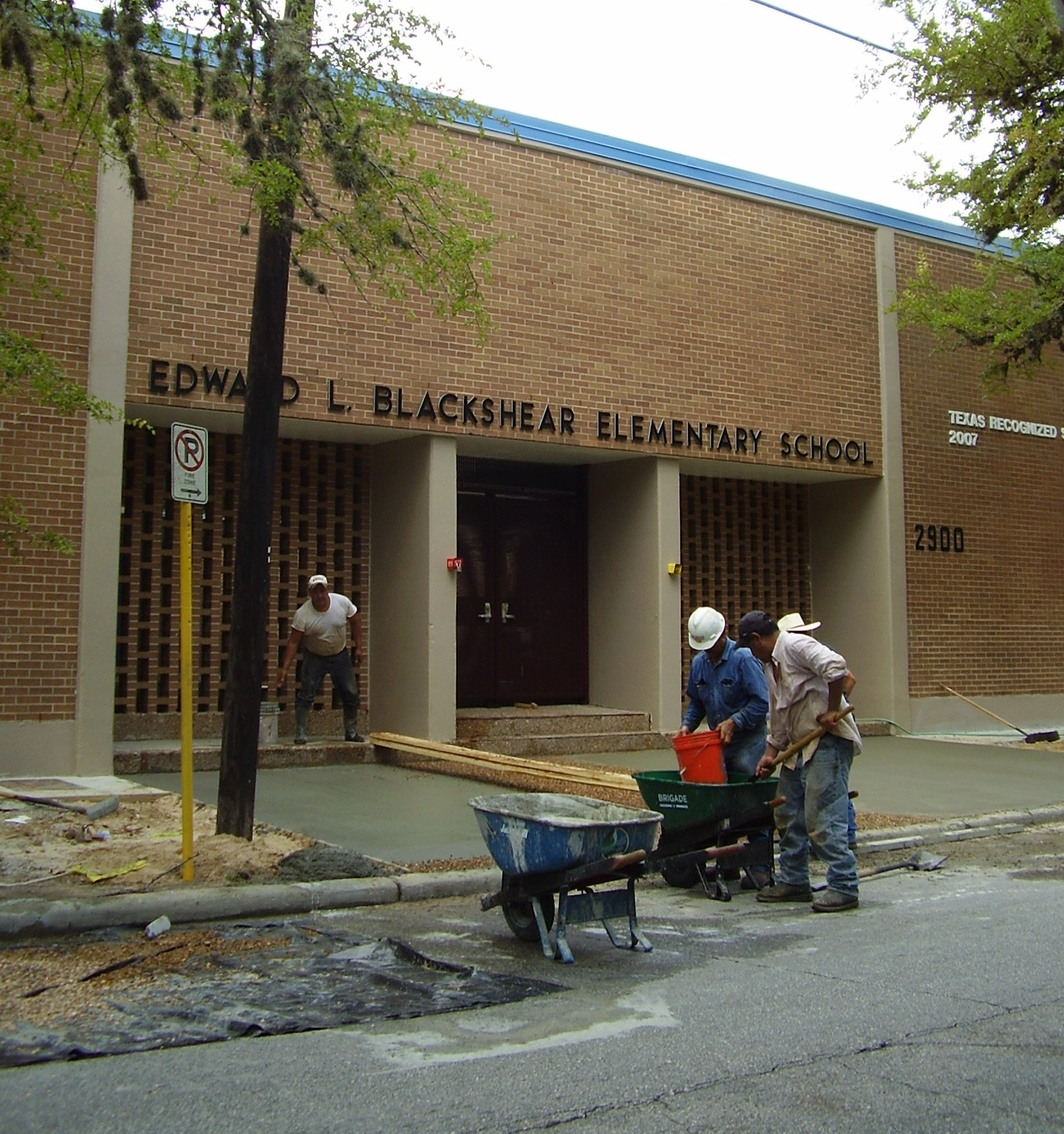
Blackshear Elementary School

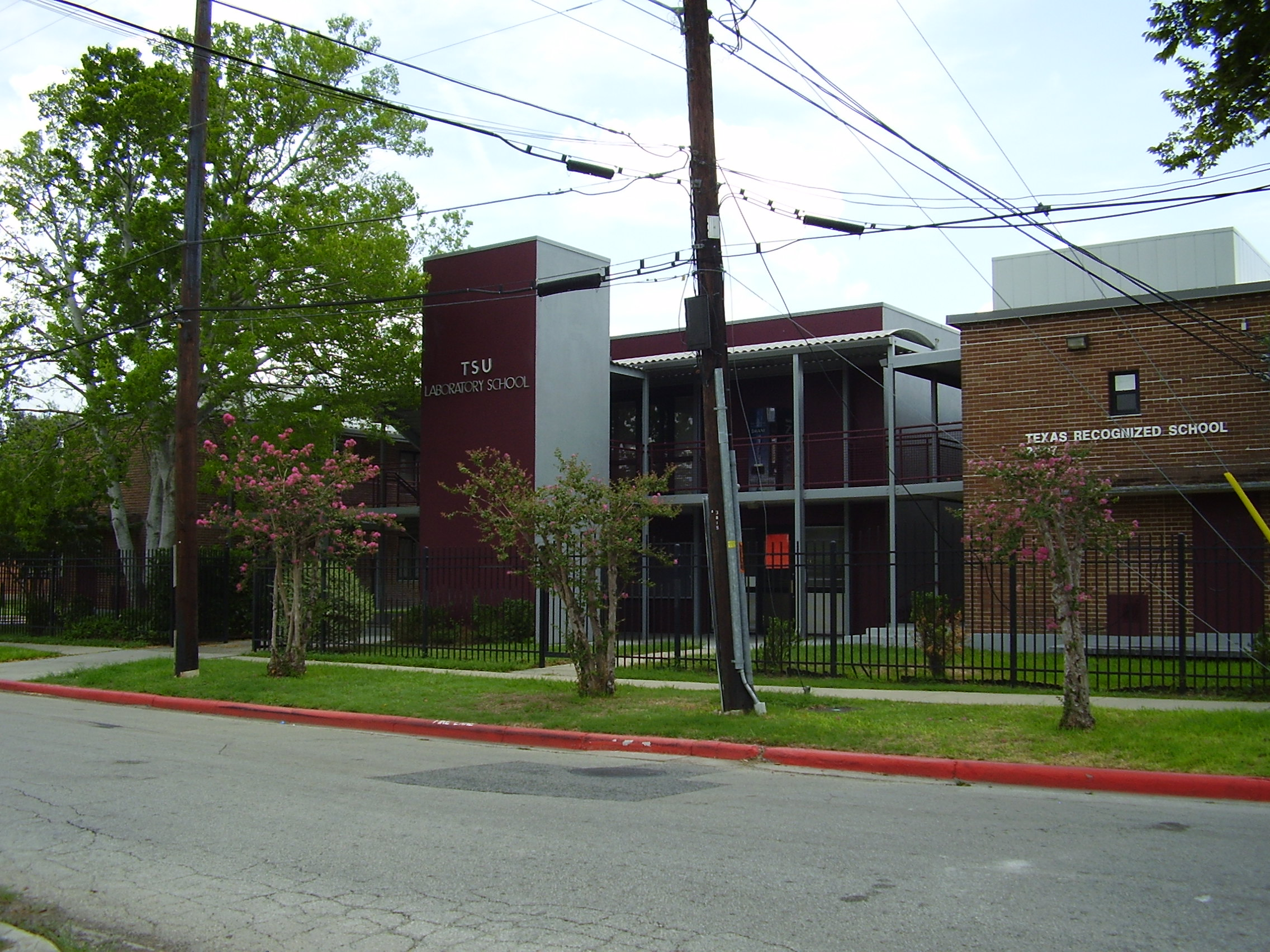
Texas Southern University/Houston Independent School District Charter Laboratory School in Cuney Homes

=== Public libraries ===
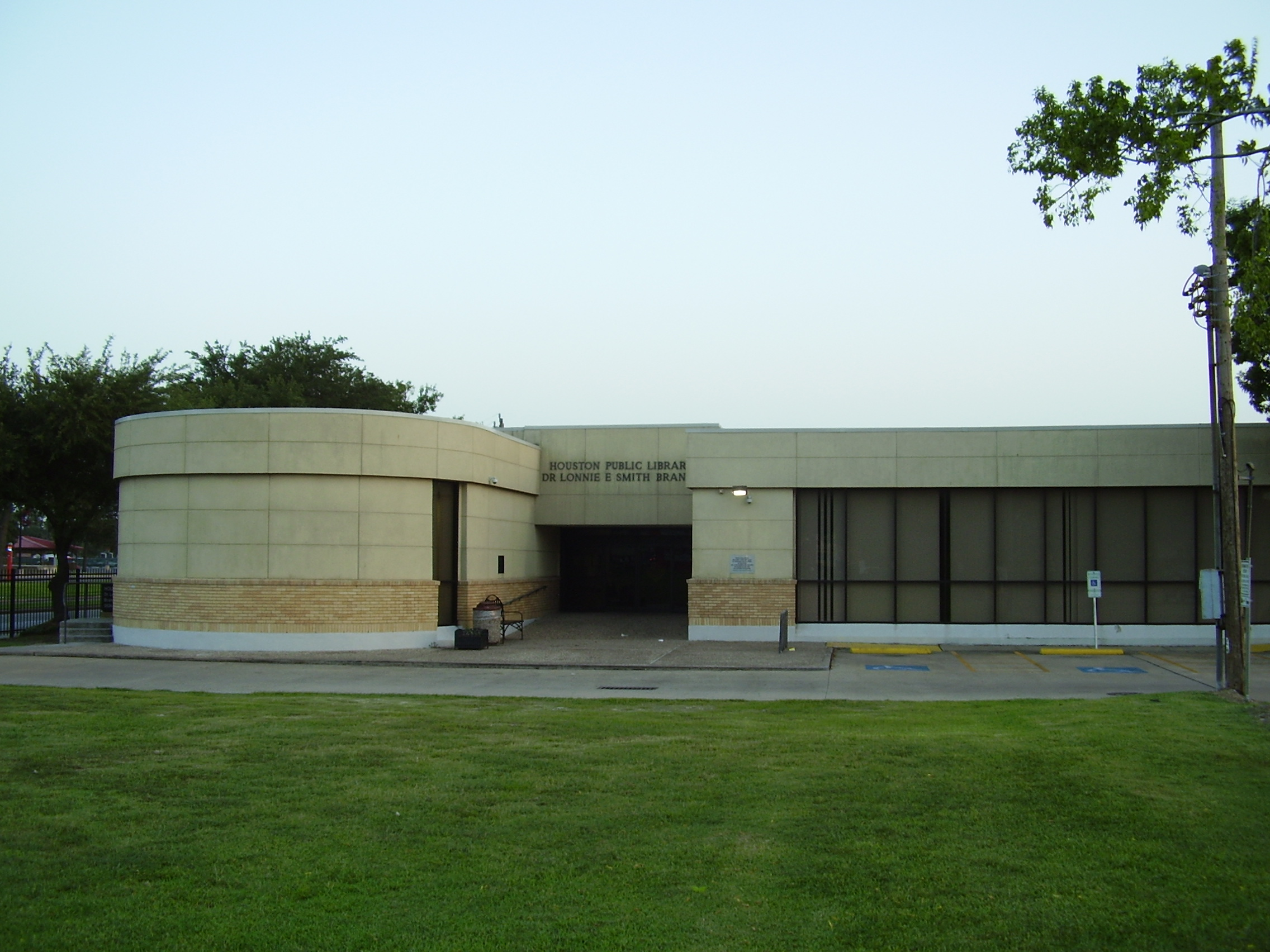
Smith Branch Library

The Third Ward is served by the Houston Public Library Smith Neighborhood Library at 3624 Scott Street.

== Health care ==
The Quentin Mease Health Facility (formerly Quentin Mease Community Hospital), operated by Harris Health System (formerly Harris County Hospital District), is located in the Third Ward area. It was previously a long-term care hospital but as of 2021 is being transformed into an outpatient facility.

The Martin Luther King Health Center, also of Harris Health System, first opened on April 28, 1972. Quentin Mease opened in 1983. At one point, the MLK health center was located on the first and third floors of Quentin Mease. MLK's standalone facility on Cullen Boulevard was scheduled to open in 2009 and free space at Quentin Mease. On May 14, 2010, MLK relocated to a site in southern Houston, on Swingle Road. The designated public hospital is Ben Taub General Hospital in the Texas Medical Center.

The southeast branch of the American Red Cross serves the Third Ward.

In 2017 the University of Houston HEALTH Research Institute received a $2 million grant for an anti-obesity and anti-diabetes program to be established in the Third Ward.

== Transportation ==
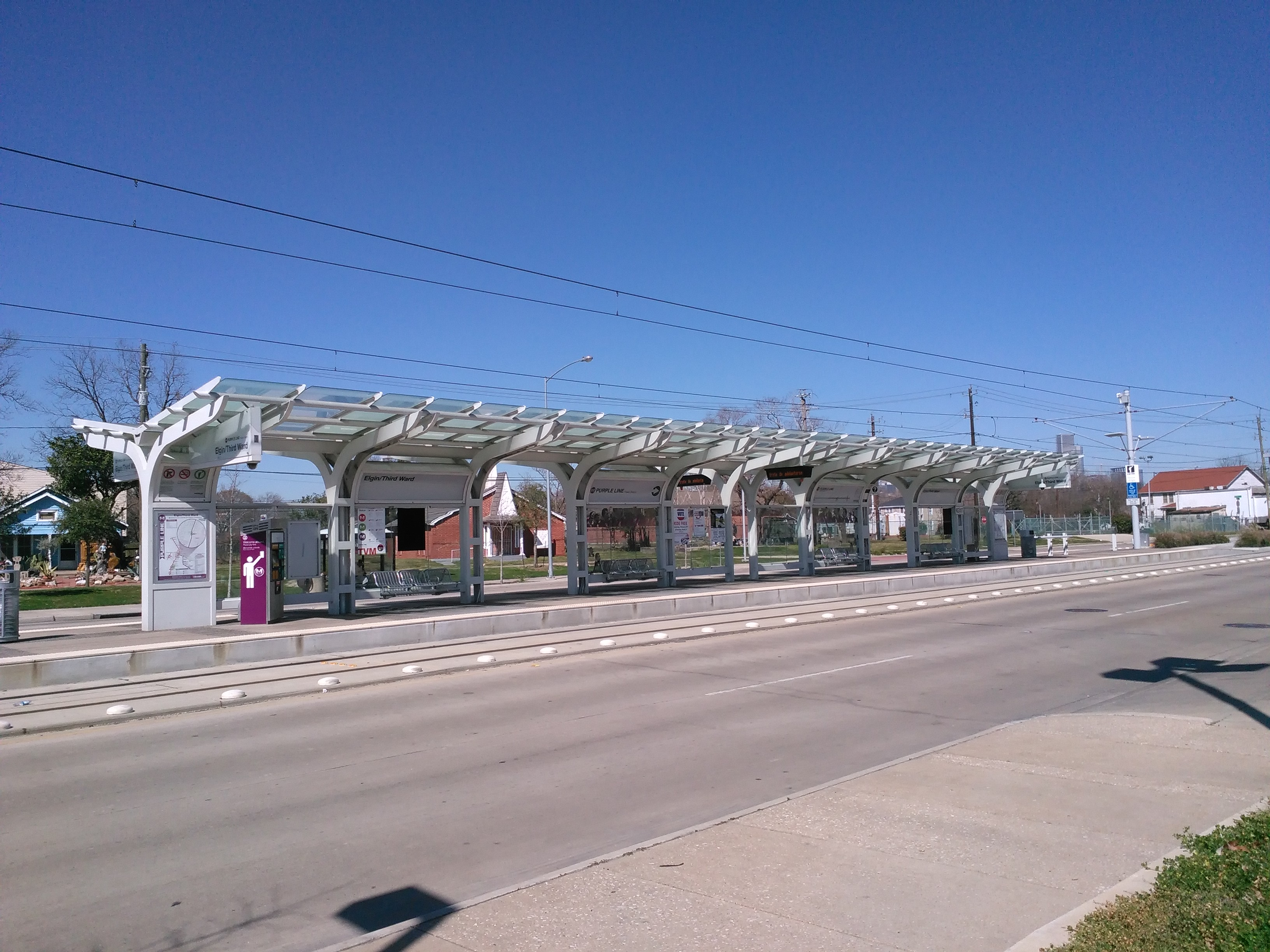
Elgin/Third Ward station

Metropolitan Transit Authority of Harris County (METRO) operates public transportation services, including buses and the METRORail tram service. METRORail Purple Line stations serving Third Ward include:

- Leeland/Third Ward station (in the East Downtown)
- Elgin/Third Ward station
- TSU/UH Athletics District station
- UH South/University Oaks station

== Arts and culture ==
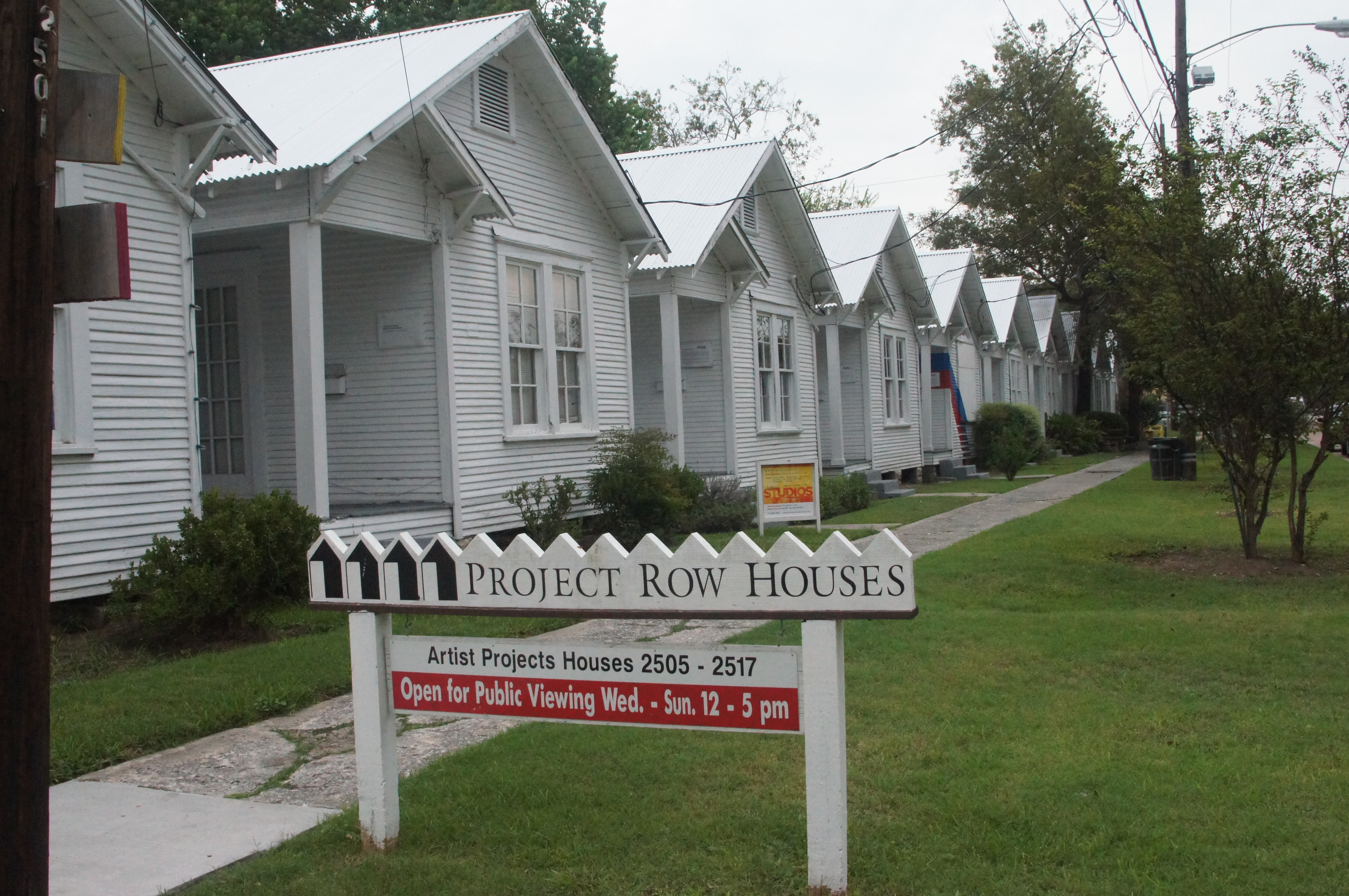
Project Row Houses

The Trinity United Methodist Church, which began in 1848, is the oldest African-American church congregation in the City of Houston. Trinity does not occupy the oldest church building.

Project Row Houses (PRH) is a community-based arts and culture non-profit organization in Houston's northern Third Ward, one of the city's oldest African-American neighborhoods. It was founded in 1993 by artist and community activist Rick Lowe, along with James Bettison (1991), Bert Long, Jr. (1940-2013), Jesse Lott, Floyd Newsum, Bert Samples, and George Smith, all seeking to establish a positive, creative and transformative presence in this historic community. Inspired by both the American artist Dr. John T. Biggers (1924-2001) and the German artist Josef Beuys (1921-1986), PRH is a unique experiment in activating the intersections between art, historic preservation, affordable and innovative housing, community relations and development, neighborhood revitalization, and human empowerment.

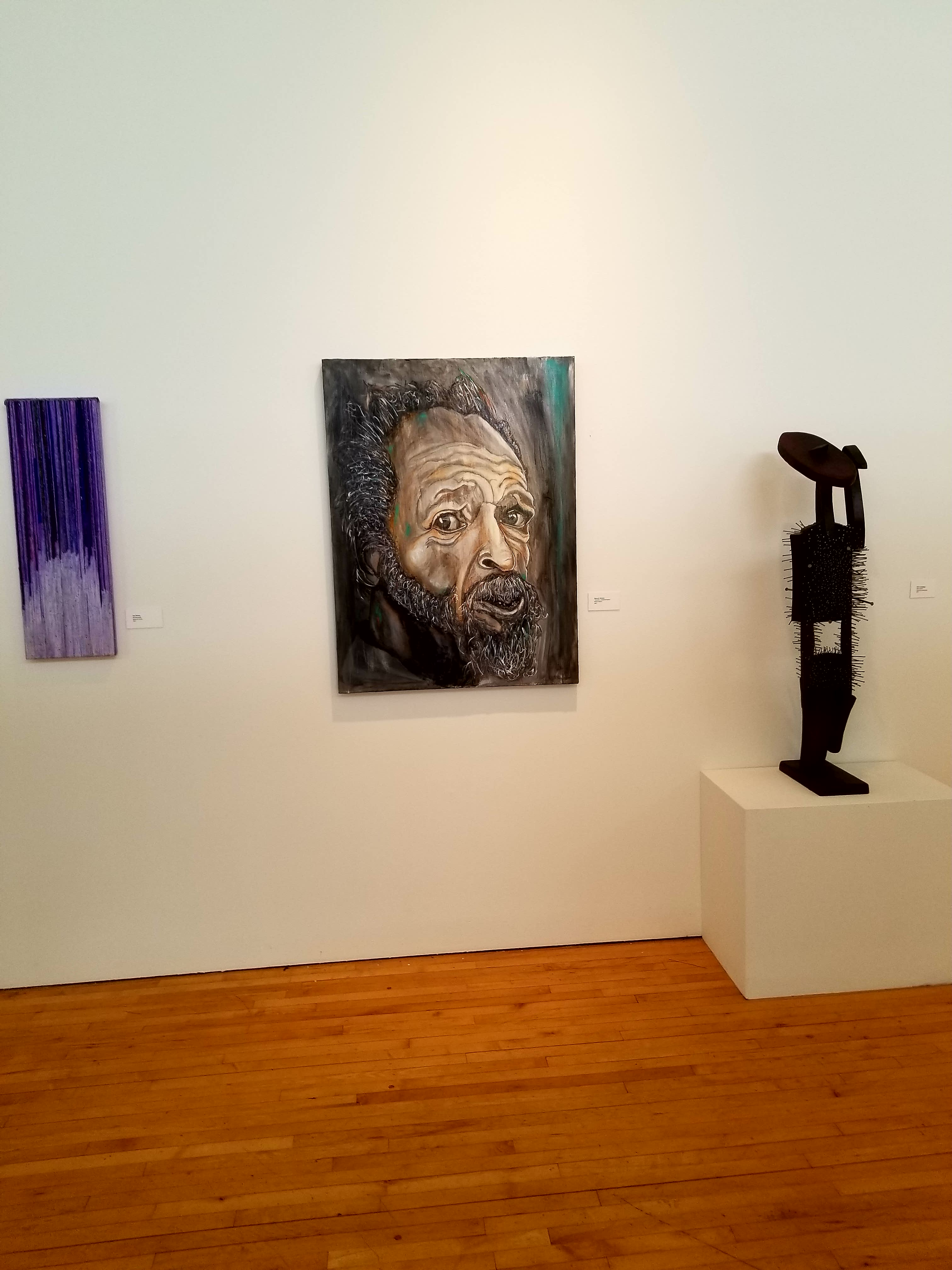
University Museum at Texas Southern University

Katharine Shilcutt of the Houston Press said that the Third Ward includes "a diverse mix of restaurants to suit every taste". Among these are fried chicken restaurants; The original Frenchy's Chicken and its satellite location are both located in the Third Ward. The University Museum at Texas Southern University (TSU) is one of a few museums in Texas that emphasizes celebrating art and artifacts by creators of the African Diaspora. Renowned art historian and curator Dr. Alvia Wardlaw is the director of the museum.

The Community Artists' Collective is a nonprofit organization founded by Michelle Barnes and Dr. Sarah Trotty that has served Third Ward community for thirty years, providing educational programming and support for African-American artists since its conception in 1985.

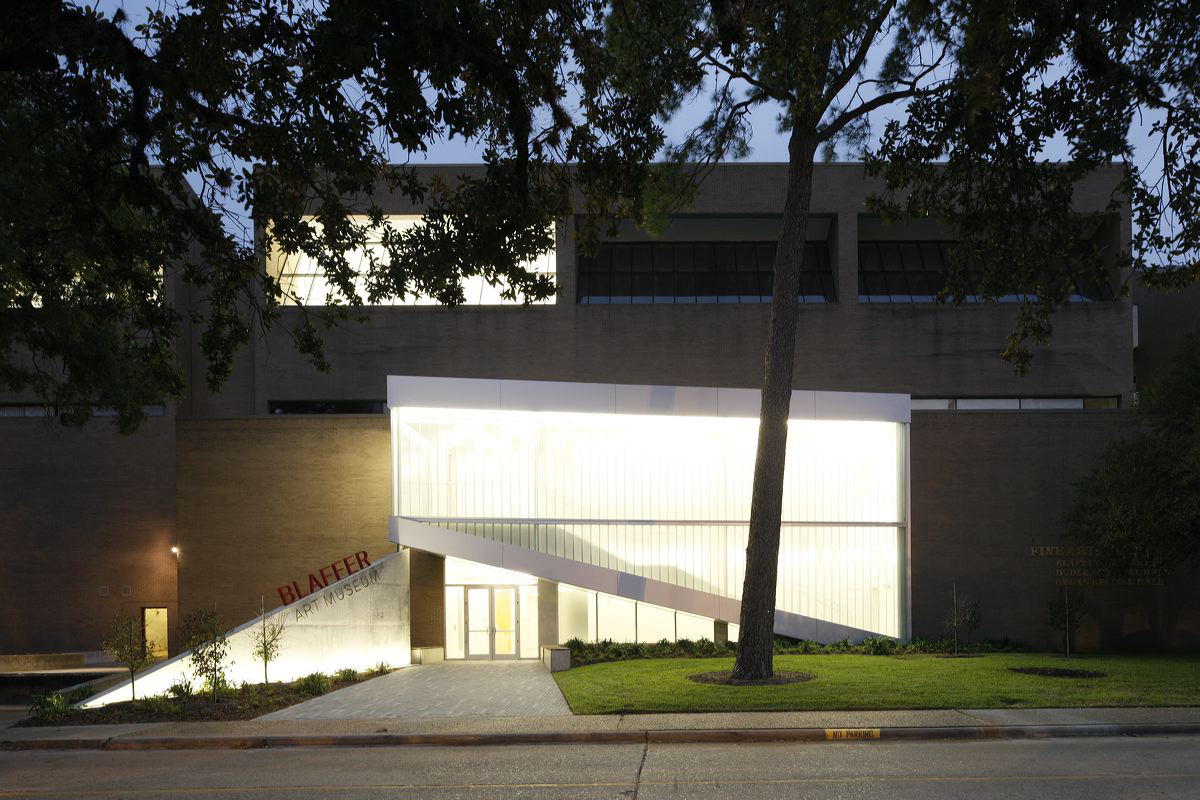
Blaffer Art Museum at UH

Houston Chronicle columnist Joy Sewing wrote in 2020 that "The 'Tre, as we natives say, is a predominately Black neighborhood just south of downtown and east of the Museum District. Despite the stereotypes that often come with inner-city Black neighborhoods, Third Ward is also home to some of the city's most noted and greatest African-American artists, activists, educators and leaders."

The Blaffer Art Museum at the University of Houston focus on major monographic and group exhibitions of national and international contemporary artists as well as artwork by University of Houston School of Art students.

== Parks and recreation ==
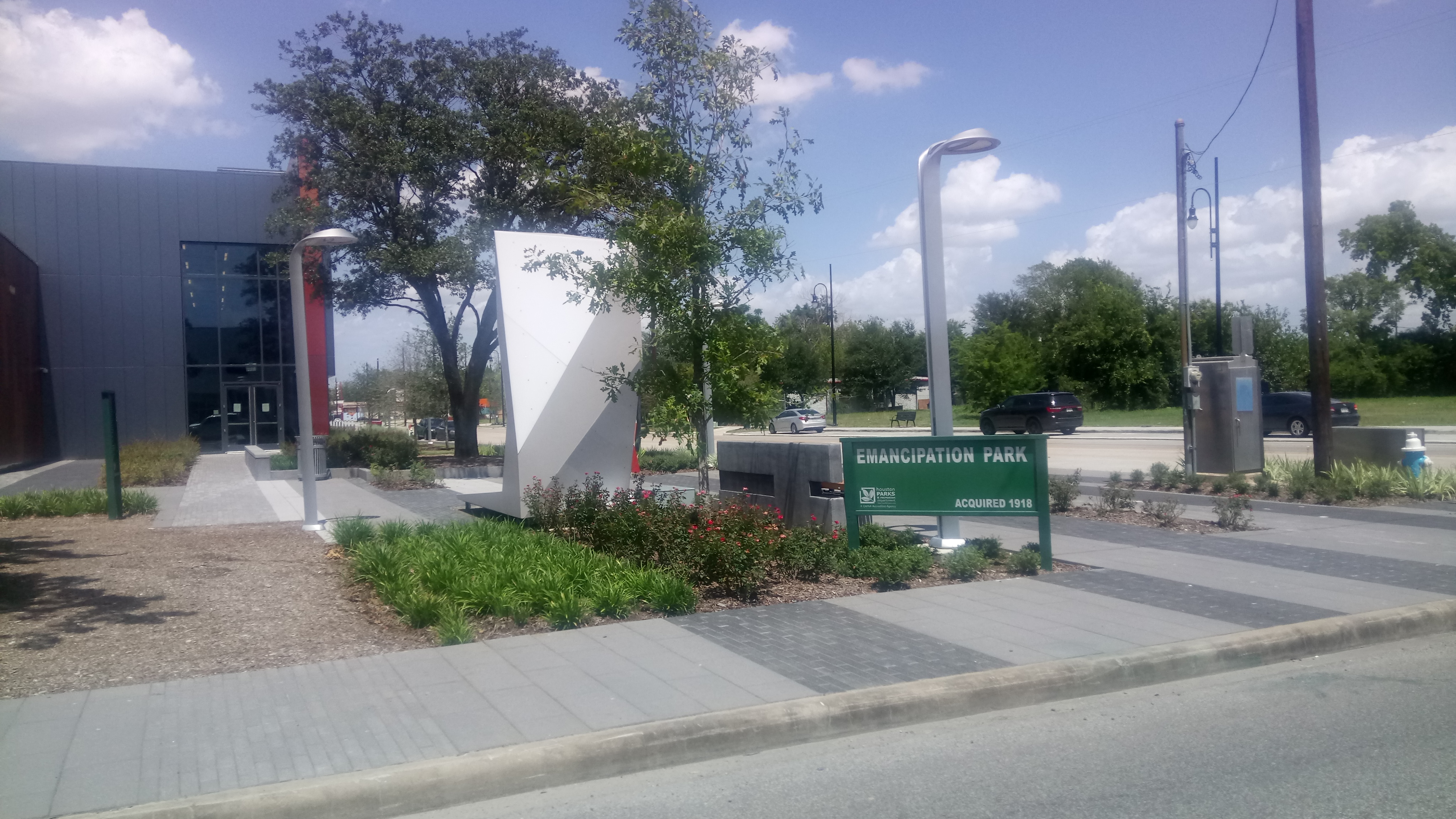
Emancipation Park

Emancipation Park and Emancipation Community Center are located at 3018 Dowling Street. Around 1870 the original owners of Emancipation Park purchased it to commemorate the end of slavery in the United States. The community center includes an indoor gymnasium, a weight room, and meeting rooms. The park has an outdoor basketball pavilion, lighted sports fields, lighted tennis courts, a swimming pool, a playground, and picnic areas.

Moses Leroy Park is located at 3100 Trulley Street. Our Park is located at 2604 Alabama Street beside SHAPE Community Center. Zurrie M. Malone Park is located at 2901 Nettleton Street, near Anita Street. Riverside Park is located at 2600 Calumet. The Third Ward is included in the service area of the Sam Houston Area Council Boy Scouts W.L. Davis District.

The Houston Texans YMCA, serving the Third Ward, is located in Palm Center. The previous YMCA facility in the Third Ward was the South Central YMCA, between the two universities. This YMCA, in the era of de jure racial segregation, was open to African-Americans. Civil rights activist Quentin Mease found a previous facility and sought to expand it, with a new facility opening in 1955. This facility serviced activists in the Civil Rights Movement and housed NAACP meetings. By the mid-2000s, the building had problems with its air conditioning and plumbing. Membership fell by 90%, and at the end of its life it had 300 members. For these reasons it closed in December 2004. The following year the board of that YMCA planned to relocate to a new facility.

== Notable residents ==
- Debbie Allen, actress/dancer/director
- Phylicia Allen, actress/dean of Howard University Chadwick Boseman School of Fine Arts)
- Michelle Barnes, artist and arts administrator
- Beyoncé
- Arnett Cobb
- Albert Collins
- Johnny Copeland
- Garnet Coleman, state representative
- J. Elle, writer
- George Floyd
- Sam "Lightnin'" Hopkins
- Solange Knowles
- Anthony Obi "Fat Tony"
- Pat Parker
- Rinny Perkins, writer and artist
- Slim Thug hip-hop artist
- Big Moe hip hop artist
- DJ Screw originator of Chopped & Screwed music

== In popular culture ==
Beyoncé grew up in the Riverside Terrace area and features the neighborhood in her music video "No Angel" from her 2013 self-titled fifth album Beyoncé. Also from the album, songs "Drunk in Love" and "Pretty Hurts" further represent the neighborhood. Her company, Parkwood Entertainment, is named for Parkwood Park, where she played as a child.

Rapper Drake has also made references to Third Ward, as well as Houston more generally, in his music. In his 2014 single "Days in the East," he states: "Know I do this [expletive] for Third Ward already/ Know I do this __ for H-town already." Despite hailing from Toronto, Drake repeatedly mentions Houston in his songs and has adopted it as a city he represents.

Houston rappers often reference Third Ward in their lyrics.

== See also ==
- Emancipation Park of Third Ward
- History of the African-Americans in Houston
- Riverside Terrace
