= Rinny Perkins =

American artist, comedian, actress and writer

- Born: Houston, Texas, U.S.
- Occupations: Artist, writer, actress, comedian
- Years active: 2009–present
- Known for: Brownie Points (online store)

Rinny Perkins is an American artist, comedian, actress, and writer. She created the online shop Brownie Points featuring original memes of Black women from retro media. Her debut book, an essay collection called Not Everyone is Going to Like You: Thoughts From a Former People Pleaser was released in April 2023.

== Career ==
Perkins moved to Los Angeles in 2009 to pursue an acting career. She trained in comedy at Upright Citizens Brigade and eventually began to make her living as a performer.

In 2017 she opened an online shop called Brownie Points featuring memes with original writing and designs. The memes are often drawn from her own life experiences, such as "Bad Bitch on Antidepressants." Many of her digital graphics have a 1960s or 1970s aesthetic with images of Black women from back issues of magazine ads and records. Her work also has feminist themes. In an interview with i-D she stated about her artistry, "I like to think of my work as propaganda for Black personhood. I strive to saturate viewers with undeniable images of Blackness adjacent to my own personal experiences; so much so that our existence is normalized and not othered."

In April 2023 Perkins released her debut book Not Everyone is Going to Like You, an essay collection interspersed with original memes and designs.

== Personal life ==
Perkins, born and raised in the Third Ward, Houston, Texas. Her education and social life were shaped by her upbringing in the predominantly Black neighborhood, and she has stated that her work is heavily informed by that experience.

She is queer.

== Works ==
- 2023, April 25. Not Everyone Is Going to Like You: Thoughts from a Former People Pleaser. Penguin Young Readers Group, ISBN 9780593325520

== Filmography ==
Year	Title	Role	Notes
2018	Bosch	Toben	Recurring role
2022	Physical	Melinda	2 episodes
2023	Grand Crew	Jordan	2 episodes
