= The Lawson Academy =

Charter middle school in Houston, Texas

Coordinates: 29°42′52″N 95°21′22″W

The Lawson Academy, formerly WALIPP-TSU Preparatory Academy (WALIPP Prep), is a charter middle school in the Third Ward area of Houston, Texas. It was established as waves of single sex public schools opened in American inner city communities circa the 2000s.

The school focuses on students living in urban communities, but does not have a specific focus on students deemed to be "at risk".

== History ==
It was established by the 501(c)(3) William A. Lawson Institute for Peace and Prosperity (WALIPP), headed by Audrey Lawson, the wife of the pastor emeritus of the Wheeler Avenue Baptist Church, William Lawson. The nonprofit had been established on April 15, 1996. After members of the U.S. Congress expressed support for male-only and female-only education at the primary and secondary levels, and a federal law passed making it easier for single-gender schools to get federal funding, WALIPP opened the school in fall 2002.

The school was initially boys' only, and a charter school affiliated with the Houston Independent School District (HISD). In the beginning it was given temporary classroom space at Dodson Elementary School in what is now East Downtown. In Spring 2003 it moved into its first dedicated facility at 3810 Ruth Street. In 2007 it moved to 3100 Cleburne, second floor, on the Texas Southern University campus. In 2010 it received a charter from the State of Texas and was no longer affiliated with HISD. It added a girls' program in 2011, housed at St. James Episcopal Church. It received its current name in 2015.

The prospective opening of the current Lawson building was January 2017, with $1 million of funds coming from the Kinder Foundation, as well as a grant from the federal government. The school hitherto did not have a permanent campus partly because charter schools cannot raise bonds to have new campuses built. The current campus is in proximity to the University of Houston.

== Curriculum ==
Despite the association with the pastor, the school is banned from giving religious instruction as it is a public charter school.

== Admissions ==
As of 2010 the school had no entrance requirements.

== Student body ==
As of 2014 most of the students came from lower socioeconomic backgrounds. There were students who originated from and who did not originate from the area around the school.

== Notes ==
- Much of the content originates from Third Ward, Houston
