= Yellowstone Schools =

School organization in Houston, Texas, US

Coordinates: 29.737510°N 95.355743°W

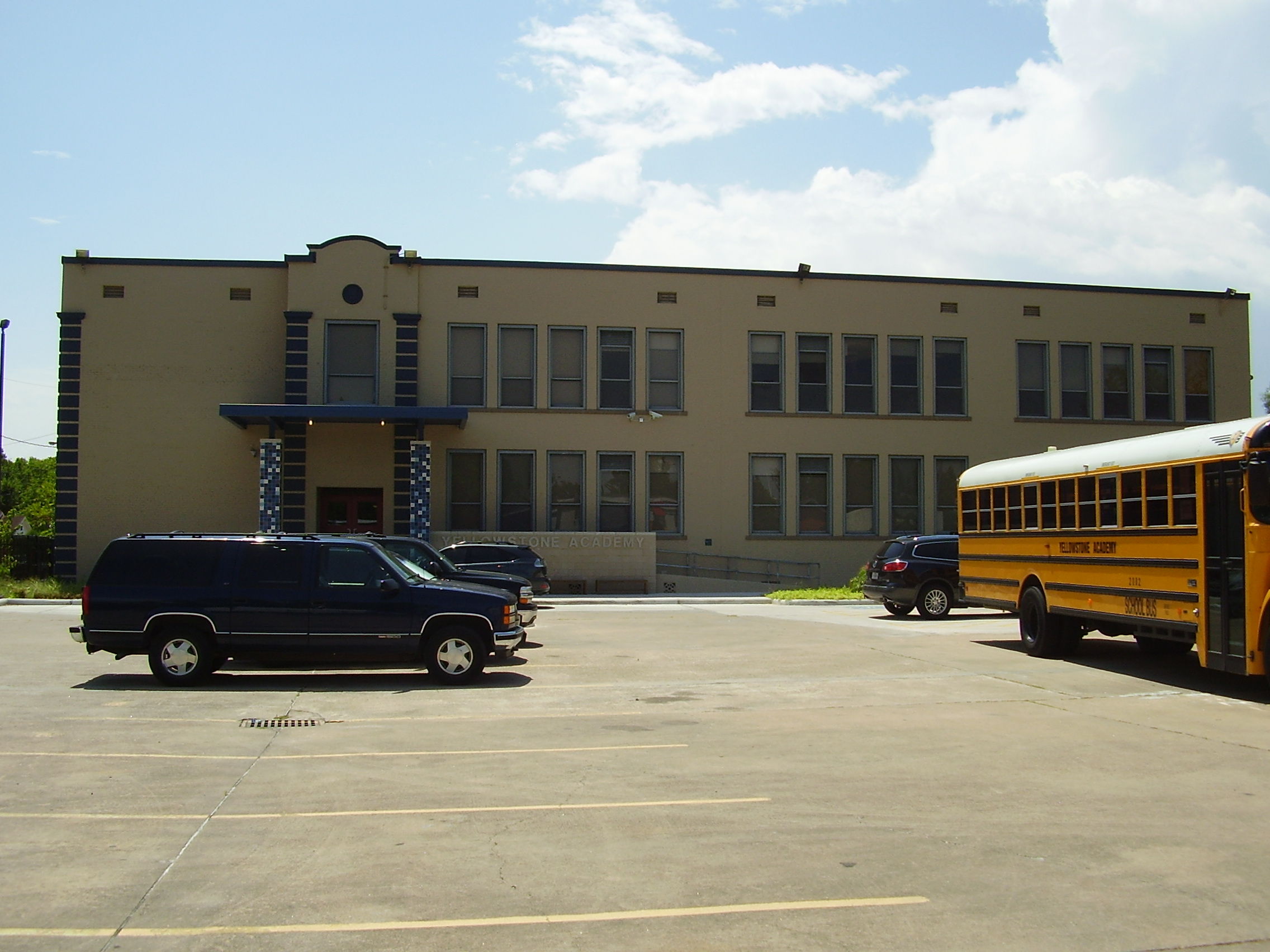
- Yellowstone Schools, then Yellowstone Academy
- Texas; United States

Information
- Type: Private (for Yellowstone Academy); Charter (for Yellowstone College Prep)
- Religious affiliations: Christianity (for Yellowstone Academy); None (for Yellowstone College Prep)
- Established: 2002
- Website: yellowstoneschools.org

Yellowstone Schools is a school organization based in the Third Ward, Houston, Texas.

One component is Yellowstone's lower school, a non-profit, non-denominational Christian, private school, which includes pre-kindergarten to grade 5 (formerly known as "Yellowstone Academy"). The other component is a charter school, Yellowstone's upper school, which covers secondary grades (6-12) (formerly known as Yellowstone College Prep). Both are separate under law, but work together.

The Yellowstone system was established to educate low-income Black children in the Third Ward area, and it is one of three Houston area private schools aimed at low income families. It occupies several buildings, including the former Frederick Douglass Elementary School.

== History ==
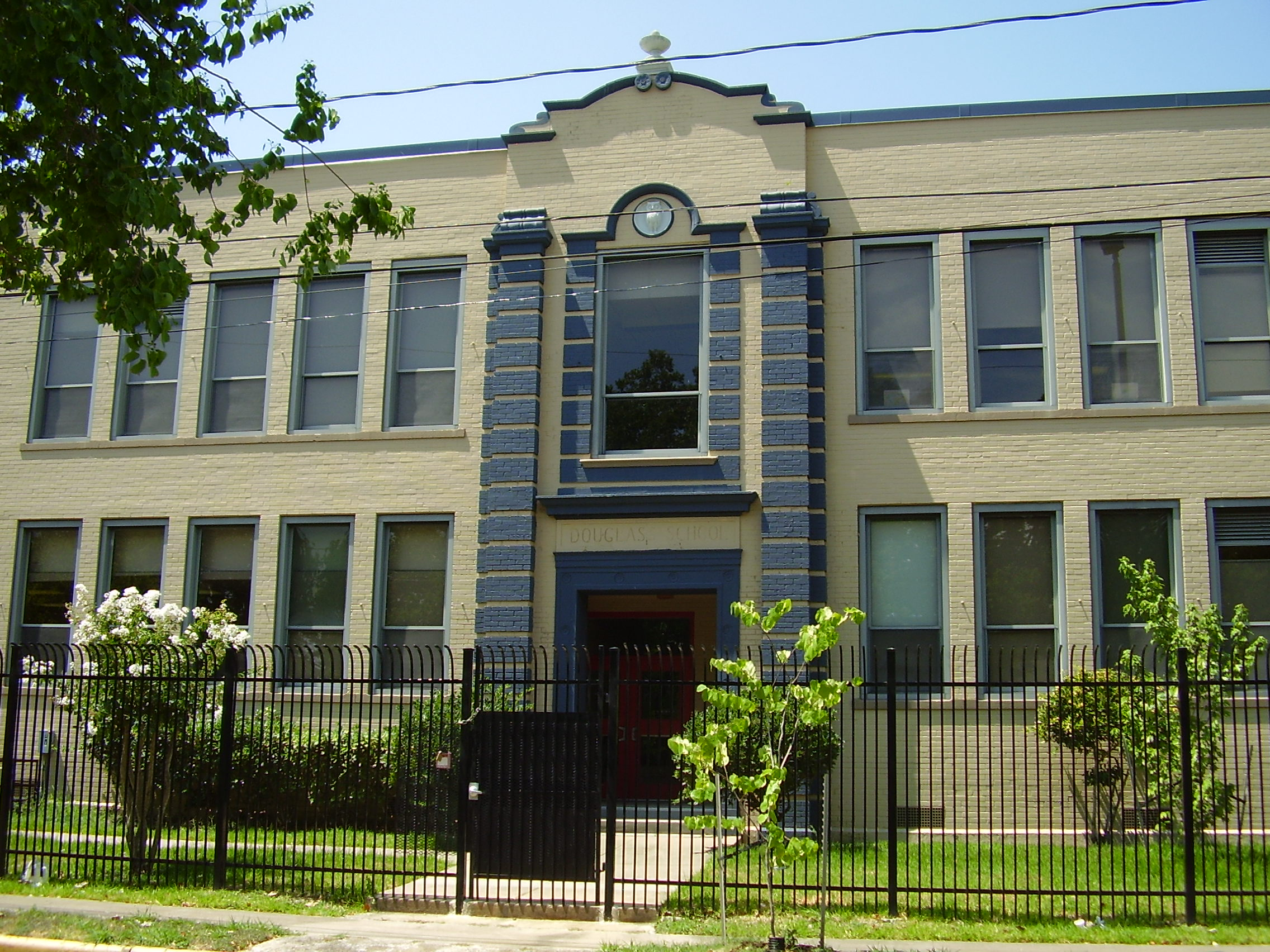
The campus Yellowstone currently occupies was formerly Douglass Elementary School

David and Kristi Lumpkins co-founded Yellowstone Academy. The non-profit organization Yellowstone Academy opened in July 2001. After the board of directors was established, the board hired Kim Hansen as the executive director. The board asked her to travel to twelve inner city private schools across the United States to observe their practices. The school opened in August 2002, within leased facilities in the Lilly Grove Missionary Baptist Church. The school had an initial enrollment of 64 students, all three- and four-year-olds who lived in the Third Ward.

In August 2003, the school moved into the City of Refuge Church. Rufus and Jacqueline Smith, the pastor and his wife, assisted in recruiting students. The school did not conduct a lot of advertising or recruiting, but the school became popular. As of 2006, it had a waiting list of over 300 students, and it intended to have a maximum capacity of 352 students in grades kindergarten through 8. In 2006 it agreed to purchase the Douglass Elementary School building, a former public school facility, from the Houston Independent School District. The school's bid on the building for $1.9 million ($3034417.3 when adjusted for inflation) was above bids from other groups, such as KIPP.

The school opened a capital campaign so it does not have to take out loans to purchase the building. The school had a goal of $11.5 million ($18366209.97 when adjusted for inflation). It received $1 million ($1597061.74 when adjusted for inflation) from Jack S. Blanton and the Brown Foundation. Robert Rowling, an entrepreneur from Dallas, gave another $1 million to the school. With 85% of the targeted level of funds, the school acquired Douglass and a .7-acre (0.28 ha) plot of land at 2813 Sauer Street, adjacent to Douglass. On the Sauer property it constructed the Jack Blanton Community Center. The school took possession of the Douglass property in June 2006. Ultimately the capital campaign netted $12 million ($19164740.84 when adjusted for inflation), and it was able to acquire land for ball fields.

In 2009, the school had about 256 students. In 2010 it had about 320 students. In 2011 Hansen received the AdvancED Texas Excellence in Education Award. In 2011 the school added the eighth grade, finishing its expansion into middle school. In 2022, the school started adding a grade each year to eventually serve students all the way to 12th grade by 2026. In 2026, the school now serves 650 students from PreK all the way to 12th grade.

== Mission ==
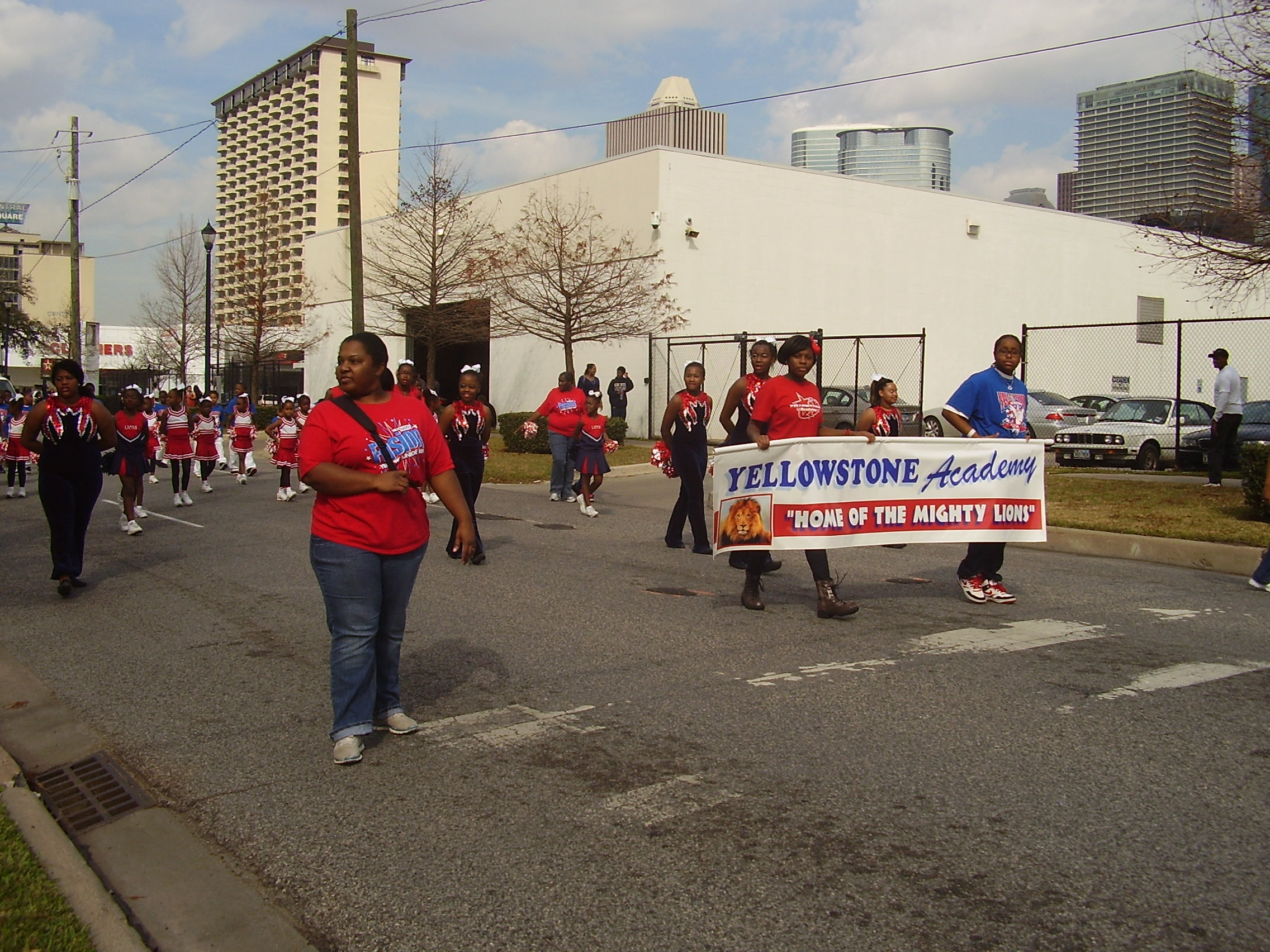
Yellowstone Academy students and staff at the 2013 Martin Luther King Day Parade in Midtown Houston

The school's goal is to educate children who are, according to the U.S. Census Bureau, under the poverty line. Specifically the school intends to serve students who live in households making no more than half of the poverty line. The school intends to put children from inner city neighborhoods at the same academic standing as children from suburbs. Yellowstone intends to prepare the students for university studies. Larry Marshall, the principal of Douglass from 1963 to 1971 and a Houston Independent School District board member as of 2006, compared Yellowstone to the Chinquapin School. Yellowstone, along with Chinquapin and Cristo Rey Jesuit College Preparatory of Houston, is one of the only private schools in Greater Houston catering to low income students.

== Facility ==
The Houston Business Journal said that the new location was a "perfect fit" for the school since its mission was to educate low income inner city students.

The Douglass Elementary School building first opened in 1927. Due to a decline in enrollment, HISD closed Douglass Elementary School in May 2005. In spring 2005 Douglass Elementary had 274 students and had faced a 26 percent decline in enrollment in a five-year period leading to 2005. After Hurricane Katrina struck in the fall of that year Douglass temporarily reopened to accommodate hurricane refugees. The HISD board voted 6–1 to lease Douglass to the KIPP program for one year, so the Katrina school could operate. KIPP opened NOW (New Orleans West) College Prep, a temporary K-8 school. In March 2006, HISD agreed to sell the Douglass Building to the academy.

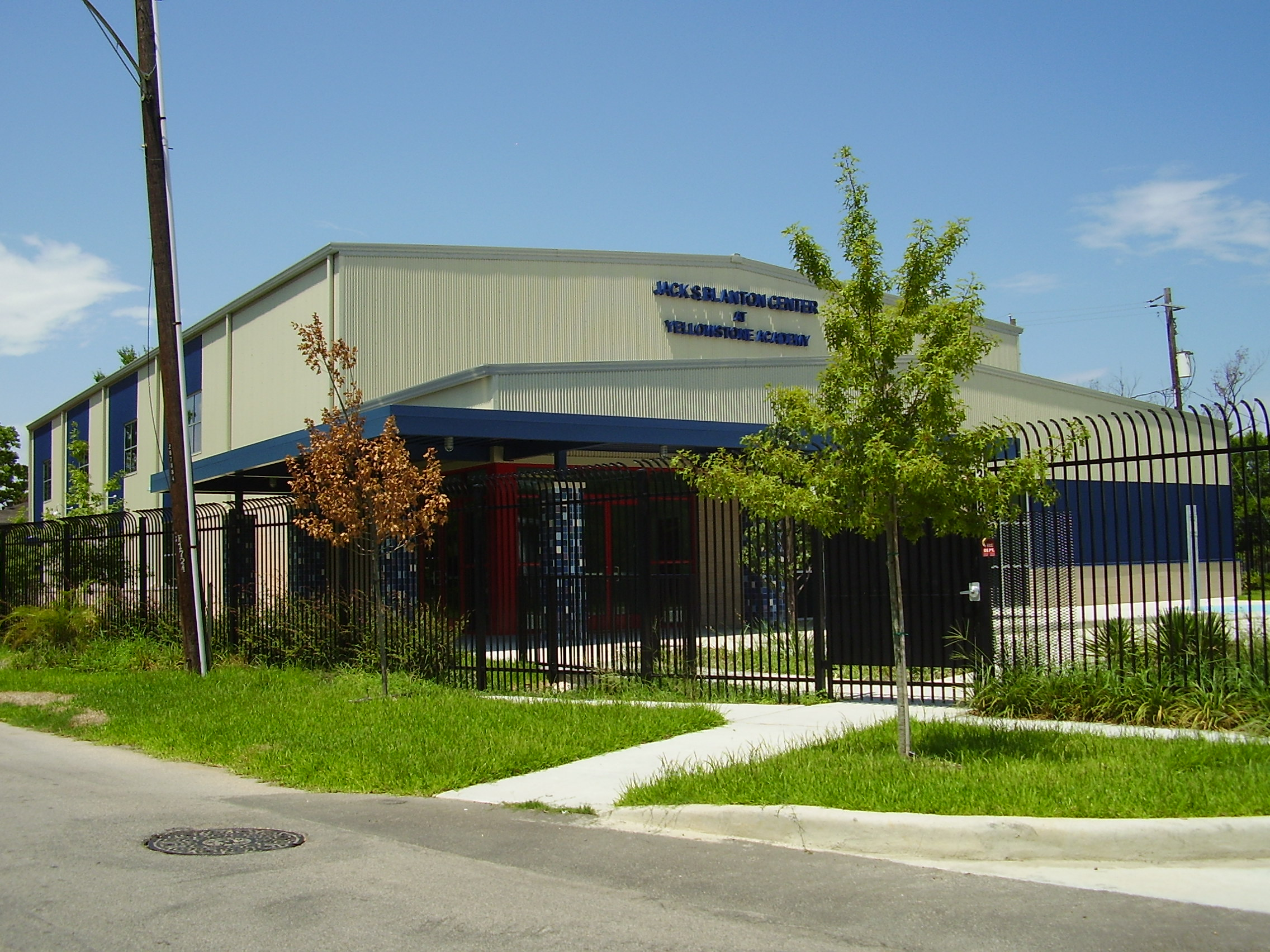
Jack S. Blanton Center

The 10,700-square-foot (990 m^{2}) Jack Blanton Community Center is located on a .7-acre (0.28 ha) plot of land at 2813 Sauer Street, adjacent to the main school. The center houses the school's physical education facilities. Yellowstone wanted a center in order to add facilities necessary for middle school students and to expand its offerings for elementary school students. Midway Cos. served as the project developer. The center has classrooms, a multipurpose basketball gymnasium, and a volleyball court. It houses an event center that is used to conduct after-school activities. The developer used refurbished materials in order to reduce negative effects on the environment. Midway donated a reclaimed metal building to Yellowstone, and that building became the community center. The developer purchased a wooden floor from a Michigan school district over eBay, and the floor became the center's basketball floor after the floor had been refurbished. The developer installed an HVAC system that met the most current energy code requirements. The Houston Business Journal gave a "landmark award" to the Blanton Center in 2009. In December 2008 the center's construction was completed.

== Student body ==
As of 2006, almost all of the students are Black. That year the typical student lived with a family who had an annual income of $9,600 ($15331.79 when adjusted for inflation), and almost 80% of Yellowstone students lived in single parent households; over half of the students received public assistance. As of 2010 the median annual household income for the households of the students was $8,000 ($11811.38 when adjusted for inflation), and most parents of Yellowstone students did not complete high school.

== Academics ==
The school's 3-year-old students receive instruction in literacy, mathematics, and social skills. In between instruction times, students take meals and naps. When the school receives preschool students, they are already academically behind other preschool students. In 2002, when the school first started, it was unable to implement a color-coded discipline system because the students did not know the names of the colors.

== Tuition ==
Yellowstone charges tuition rates which differ depending on each family's income and spending habits. As of 2006 most families pay fewer than 25 dollars per month, per child in tuition. The school says that it charges the fee, described by Jennifer Radcliffe of the Houston Chronicle as "nominal," so students could approach their studies seriously. If a family is having trouble paying tuition, the school may lower that family's tuition to $3 per month per child. Teachers have operated carpools and lent gasoline cards to ensure that students continue to attend Yellowstone while they experience times of financial difficulty. Despite the fact that payments are small sums and a small part of the school budget, school employees put a lot of effort into making sure that payments are made.

== Finances ==
Most of Yellowstone's budget consists of private funds originating from churches, corporations, foundations, and individuals. As of 2010, those groups contribute $4 million per year to the school budget. As of 2006, of Yellowstone's 1.6 million annual budget, less than one percent came from tuition. For each child, as of 2006 the school's annual cost per student was over $10,500. As of 2010, the education costs per student were about $10,000 and about $2,500 per student for meals and transportation.

Teachers quoted in a Houston Chronicle article in 2006 said that the school places two adults in each 16 student class, so its per student costs are higher than average. The school used to hold an annual fundraiser breakfast but now hosts an annual Party in the Park each spring.

The school also uses many volunteers to lower costs.
