= Texas Alliance of Accredited Private Schools =

Education association in Texas, United States

The Texas Alliance of Accredited Private Schools (TAAPS) seeks to accredit private schools that meet the standards of the association and that maintain the quality of education as expected by TAAPS.

The alliance was established to accredit nonpublic schools under the umbrella of the Texas Private School Accreditation Commission (TEPSAC). In 1985, the Texas Education Agency (TEA) discontinued nonpublic school accreditation because it interfered with the agency's first obligation to the public schools. At the time two state accrediting associations were serving Texas private schools.
