= Eastwood, Houston =

Historic Neighborhood in Houston, Texas

Coordinates: 29.73673°N 95.32094°W

Eastwood is a historic neighborhood in the East End area of Houston, Texas, United States. It forms the core of the city-designated Greater Eastwood Super Neighborhood. Eastwood maintains Houston’s largest intact collection of Craftsman, Arts & Crafts, Foursquare and Mission style architecture.

== History ==
=== Early development ===
The area now known as Eastwood, just prior to its development

Eastwood, then at the extreme southeast corner of Houston, was one of Houston’s first master-planned subdivisions. It was designed and developed in 1911 by William A. Wilson, who also developed Eastwood's sister neighborhood, Woodland Heights. The first lots went on sale in June 1912 and Eastwood officially opened in September 1913. A few of the homes were built between 1900 and 1909, prior to the official platting of the neighborhood.

The development was planned with shelled streets that were sixty to eighty feet in width, cement curbs and sidewalks, city water, gas, electricity, telephones and sanitary sewerage, as well as terraced lots designed for natural drainage. One of the unique features of the neighborhood is the symmetrically planned placement of live oak and sycamore trees. Wilson envisioned Eastwood to be a more upscale counterpart to the Woodland Heights subdivision, which he previously developed in Houston. Utility service connections were placed at the rear of the lots to avoid marring the landscape of the community streets.

A boulevard driveway was built through the center of the neighborhood, which skirted a natural ravine that provided lush greenery and a drainage route for surplus water to empty into Brays Bayou. The ravine was later filled and planted with cypress trees; it is currently the esplanade dividing Park Drive.

By October 1913, Eastwood was hailed by The Houston Daily Post as a “model suburb, one of the most convenient, attractive and beautiful homesite additions in the city of Houston."

=== Notable early residents ===
The first residents were young entrepreneurs in the city, primarily business owners and management personnel. Its reputation as one of Houston's rising preeminent suburban neighborhoods attracted wealthy and notable residents, including:

- Howard Tellepsen, former president of Tellepsen Builders
- Charles L. Bering, owner of Bering's Hardware
- Ira G. Bond
- March Culmore, President of the Sam Houston Trust Co.

Howard Hughes is believed to have lived for a brief period with his aunt on McKinney Street while he was building an airplane in a garage on nearby Eastwood Street, in addition to his oil-drilling machinery manufacturing business, the Hughes Tool Company, which moved to 5425 Polk Street in the 1940s.

=== Architectural style ===
The homes built in Eastwood were custom homes reflecting the early 20th century fondness for Craftsman, Arts & Crafts, American Foursquare and Mission styles of architecture. Today, Eastwood remains Houston’s largest intact collections of Craftsman, Arts & Crafts, and Mission-style homes. Influences from the Prairie-style of architecture, which branched from the Arts and Crafts movement, can be seen in some houses.

== Cityscape ==
Eastwood is in proximity to Daikin Park (formerly Enron Field, Astros Field, and Minute Maid Park) and Downtown Houston. YuShan Chang, author of Newcomer's Handbook Neighborhood Guide: Dallas-Fort Worth, Houston, and Austin, said that Eastwood is in proximity to "the city's major sports venues, fine arts district, and nightlife."

At a later point, Eastwood was "characterized by graffiti, abandoned buildings, and blight". In 1997, Lori Rodriguez of the Houston Chronicle said that it is "considered a forerunner of today's planned communities.". However, it wasn't until 1998 that a revitalization of the area commenced.

== Gentrification (1998–2017) ==
Between 1998 and 2013 the price per square foot of the Eastwood subdivision more than doubled—jumping from $55.75 per square foot in 1998 to $117.46 in 2013. The average price per square foot has continued to increase year-over-year: $132.81 in 2014, $143.63 in 2015, $152.31 in 2016, $169.14 in 2017 and $181.88 in 2018.

It continues to evolve into a "lovely neighborhood that is aesthetically on par with some of Houston's esteemed residential areas" that is attracting young families, single professionals, and couples who restored the older houses. Many people who find houses in the Houston Heights and Montrose unaffordable opt to buy in Eastwood. Chang said that Eastwood was "a good option for those desiring to live in a close-knit neighborhood with the grace, history, and character of the Heights, but without the price tag". However, with high demand and sale prices on the rise, Eastwood has been developing a reputation as "the new Heights".

== Landmarks ==
- The Tellepsen home at 4518 Park Drive was built in 1916 by Tom and Ingeborg Tellepsen, of Tellepsen Builders. The style of the house is an architecturally distinct "airplane bungalow", also known as a "hangar craftsman." The home features large windows and deep eaves, characteristic of the Craftsman style homes.
- Church of the Redeemer (Houston, Texas)
- The former Maxwell House coffee factory on Harrisburg Boulevard has been a prominent fixture in Houston’s East End for more than five decades. The factory was once the site of a Ford Motor Company Model T plant at the turn of the century. General Foods purchased the old Ford assembly plant in 1947 and opened the Maxwell House Coffee manufacturing facility in its place. Kraft Foods purchased the factory in 1988. The factory continues to produce coffee today. With its soaring tower and intricate neon sign in a perpetual face-off with downtown structures, the factory hints at one of the most interesting but little-known facets of East End commerce: three of America’s largest coffee roasters and distributors call the East End home. Maxwell House, Cadeco Industries, Inc. and Sara Lee Coffee & Tea. The plant is now operated by Atlantic Coffee Solutions. A massive mural made entirely from coffee beans was built in 1959 and is still preserved at the plant today.
- Eastwood is home to Tlaquepaque Plaza, a shopping center originally named the Eastwood Shopping Center. It opened in 1929 and was given its current name in 2004.
- Cage Elementary School, built in 1910
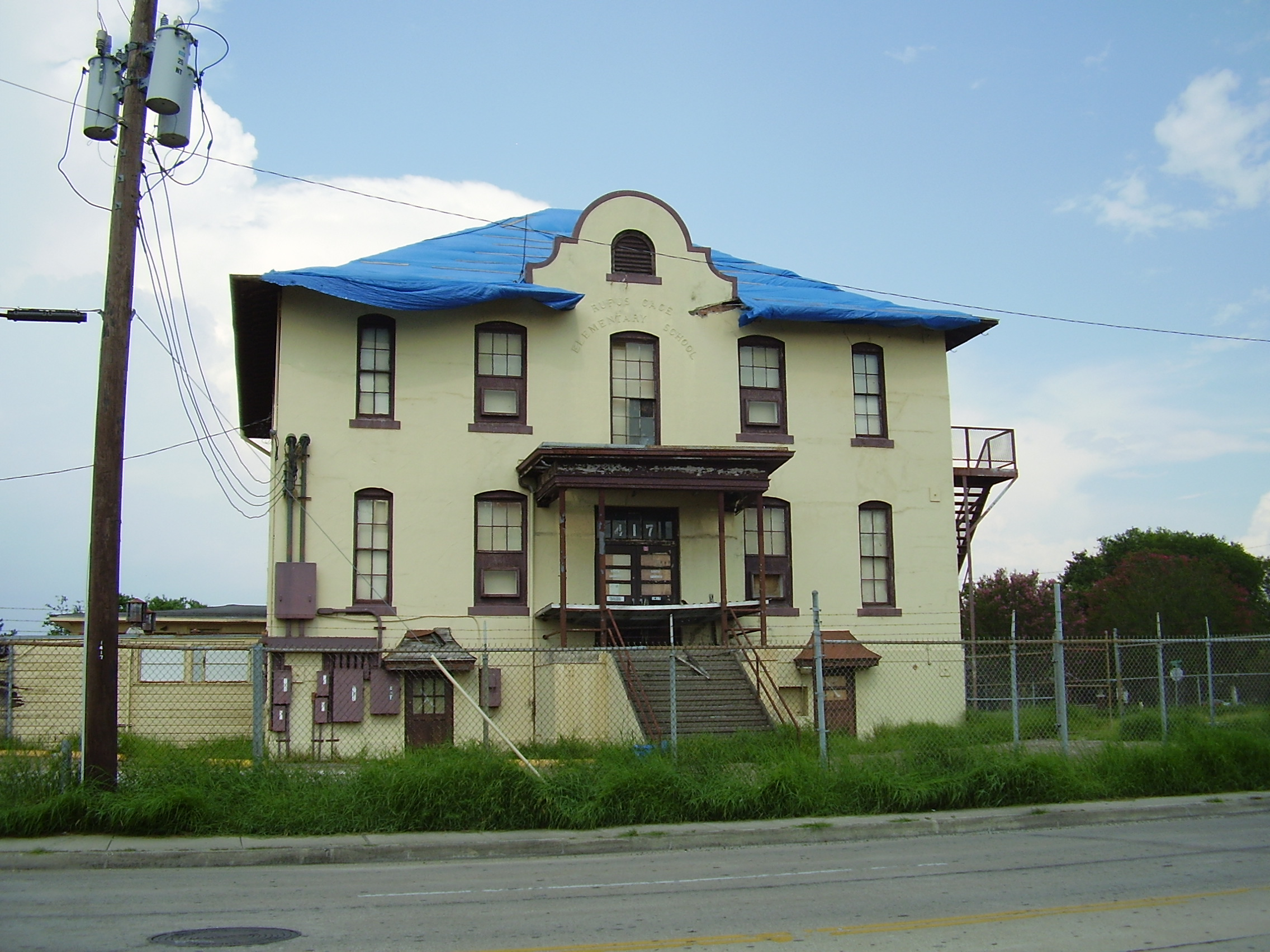
  The original Cage Elementary School
- The former Morse Candy Factory, which was purchased by the former war history museum in Navasota, TX. The group commence renovations of the abandoned factory in 2011 to transfer the World War II history museum to Houston's East End. The confectioner's plant has hosted occasional tours during the Annual Eastwood Historic Home Tour.
- The former Stewart & Stevenson manufacturing plant was used in the 1940s to fill wartime contracts with the U.S. Government during World War II. At that time, the facility was operated predominantly by female factory workers to remanufacture 2,200 green U.S. Army Jeeps and 4,000 Sherman tank engines. The facility is believed to have previously been built in the 1920s for use as a wagon factory.
- The former Hughes Tool Company headquarters were located at 5425 Polk in the 1940s. The oil-drilling machinery manufacturer was steered by celebrity owner Howard Hughes, known for his aircraft and film production. The building now houses branch offices for several state-run agencies.

== Government and infrastructure ==
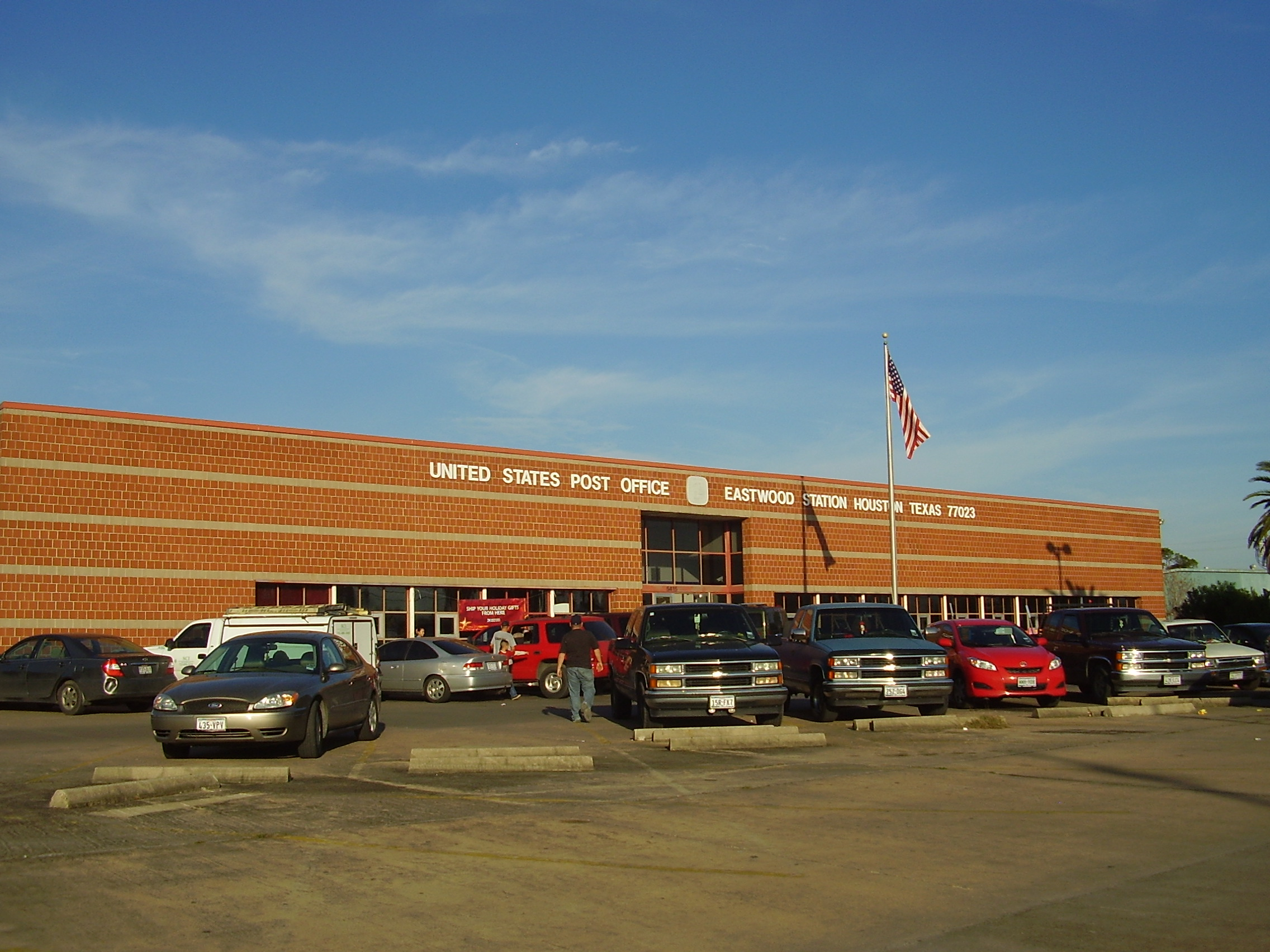
Eastwood Post Office

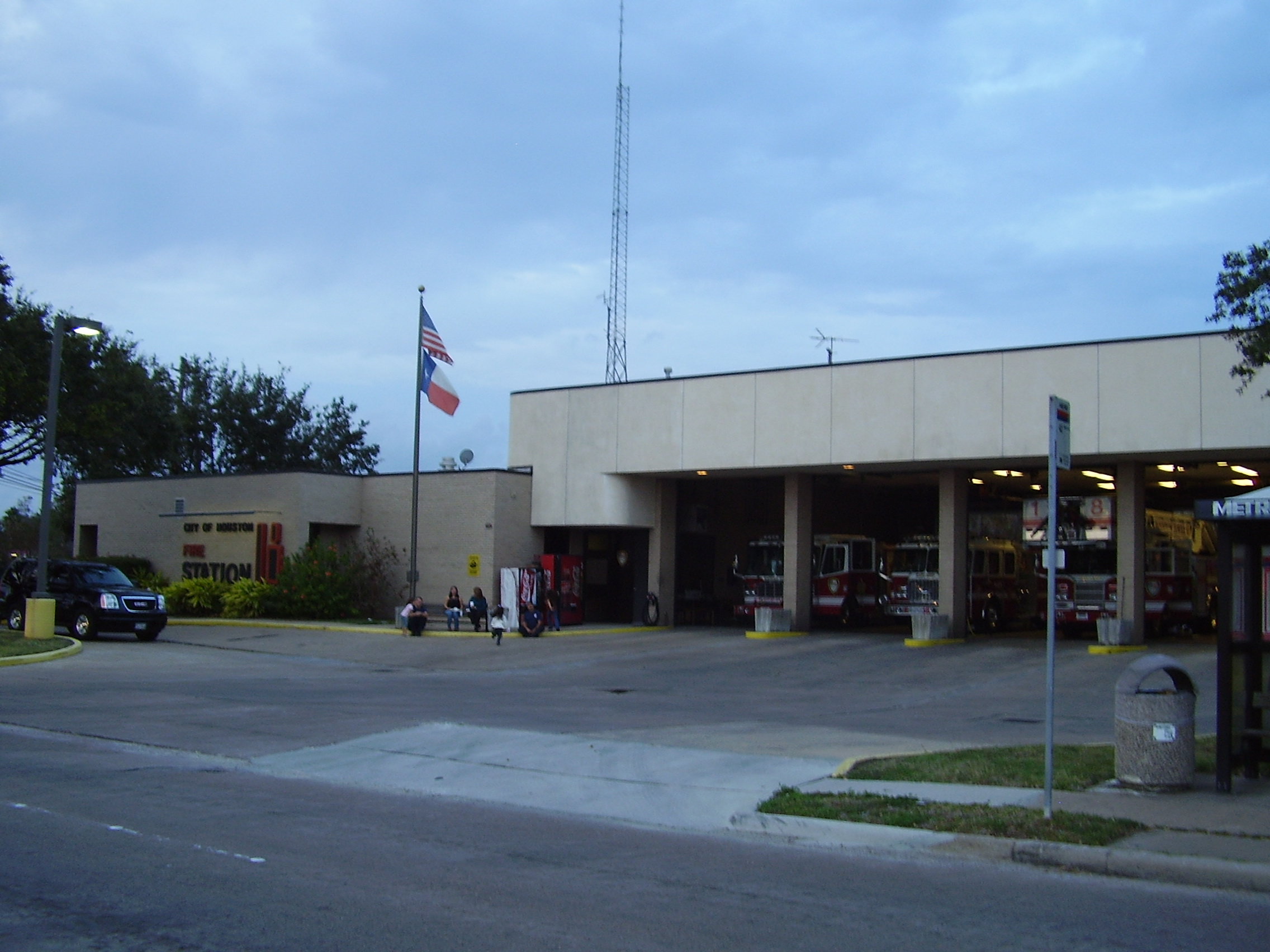
Fire Station 18

Eastwood is in the Houston City Council District I.

Eastwood is served by the following elected officials:

- Houston City Council District I - Robert Gallegos;
- Texas District 145 - Christina Morales;
- Texas Senate District 6 - Carol Alvarado;
- Texas's 29th Congressional District - Sylvia Garcia;
- United States Senator - John Cornyn;
- United States Senator - Ted Cruz

The Houston Fire Department operates Station 18 East End, in Fire District 20, along Telephone Road and in Eastwood. In 1925 Station 18 opened at the 4400 Block of Walker while its permanent facility was being constructed. The station moved to its permanent facility at 619 Telephone Road on July 7, 1926. In 1976 the station moved to the former Station 24 facility while the new Station 18 was being built along Telephone Road. In 1980 the station moved to its new permanent location. In 2001 Tropical Storm Allison damaged the station, so it was temporarily closed. Fire Station 18 re-opened in 2002. The station underwent a minor renovation in January 2008.

The United States Postal Service operates the Eastwood Post Office at 5415 Lawndale Street.

Harris Health System (formerly Harris County Hospital District) designated the Ripley Health Center in the East End for the ZIP codes 77003 and 77023. In 2000 Ripley was replaced by the Gulfgate Health Center. The designated public hospital is Ben Taub General Hospital.

== Transportation ==
The Metropolitan Transit Authority of Harris County (METRO) operates public transportation services, including buses and light rail. Several bus lines meet at the Eastwood Transit Center on Lockwood Drive. METRORail Green Line's Lockwood/Eastwood station and METRORail Purple Line's Leeland/Third Ward serve the area. The two lines converge at the nearby EADO/Stadium station, bringing commuters to and from EaDo, Downtown, and Second Ward. Interstate 45, the Gulf Freeway, was constructed immediately south of Eastwood in 1948 as Houston's first freeway.

== Parks and recreation ==
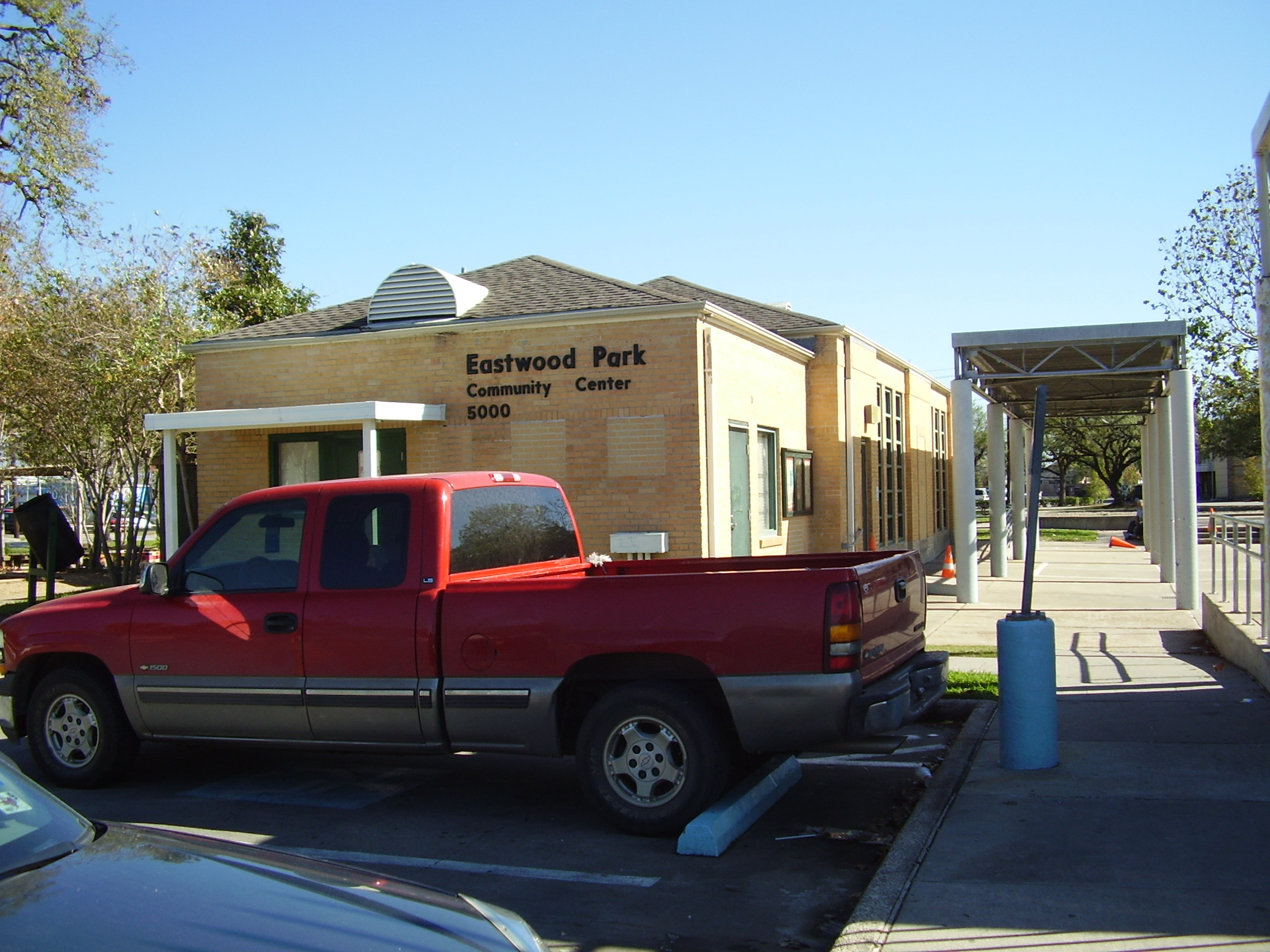
Eastwood Park

Eastwood Park, operated by the City of Houston, is located at 5000 Harrisburg Boulevard. The Eastwood Community Center is located at 5020 Harrisburg Boulevard. The center has a skate park, a swimming pool, an outdoor basketball pavilion, a lighted sports field, a playground, a .20 mile hike and bicycle trail, and lighted tennis courts. In 2009 the president of the Second Ward Super Neighborhood, Jessica Hulsey, complained about the lack of a skate park in Eastwood Park.

Diez Street Park, adjacent to Austin High School, contains four baseball diamonds, used by local Little Leagues.

== Education ==
=== Primary and secondary schools ===
==== Public schools ====
Eastwood is served by the Houston Independent School District. Eastwood is within and Trustee District VIII, represented by Diana Dávila as of 2009.

Some residents are zoned to Cage Elementary School, while other residents are zoned to Lantrip Elementary School; both schools are in Eastwood. Some residents are zoned to Carrillo Elementary School, located outside of Eastwood. All residents are zoned to Yolanda Black Navarro Middle School of Excellence (formerly Stonewall Jackson Middle School) and Austin High School in Eastwood. Eastwood Academy, an alternative school, is also located in Eastwood; anyone zoned to Austin is eligible to attend Eastwood Academy. Project Chrysalis Middle School is on the grounds of Cage Elementary.

The Kirby School opened in 1902 at a site on Telephone Road. In 1906 a newer structure opened across the street. Lantrip, originally Eastwood Elementary School, opened in 1916. In 1923 Kirby was renamed Cage Elementary School after Rufus Cage, a philanthropist and school board president. Jackson opened in 1925. Austin opened in 1936. In 1983 Cage moved to a new site on Leeland Street. Carrillo opened in 1993. Lantrip received a new facility in 2007.

In 2012 Richard Connelly of the Houston Press ranked Austin High School as the most architecturally beautiful high school campus in Greater Houston.

Effective 2026, Cage Elementary will move onto the property of Lantrip Elementary while remaining a separate institution.

==== Gallery of schools ====
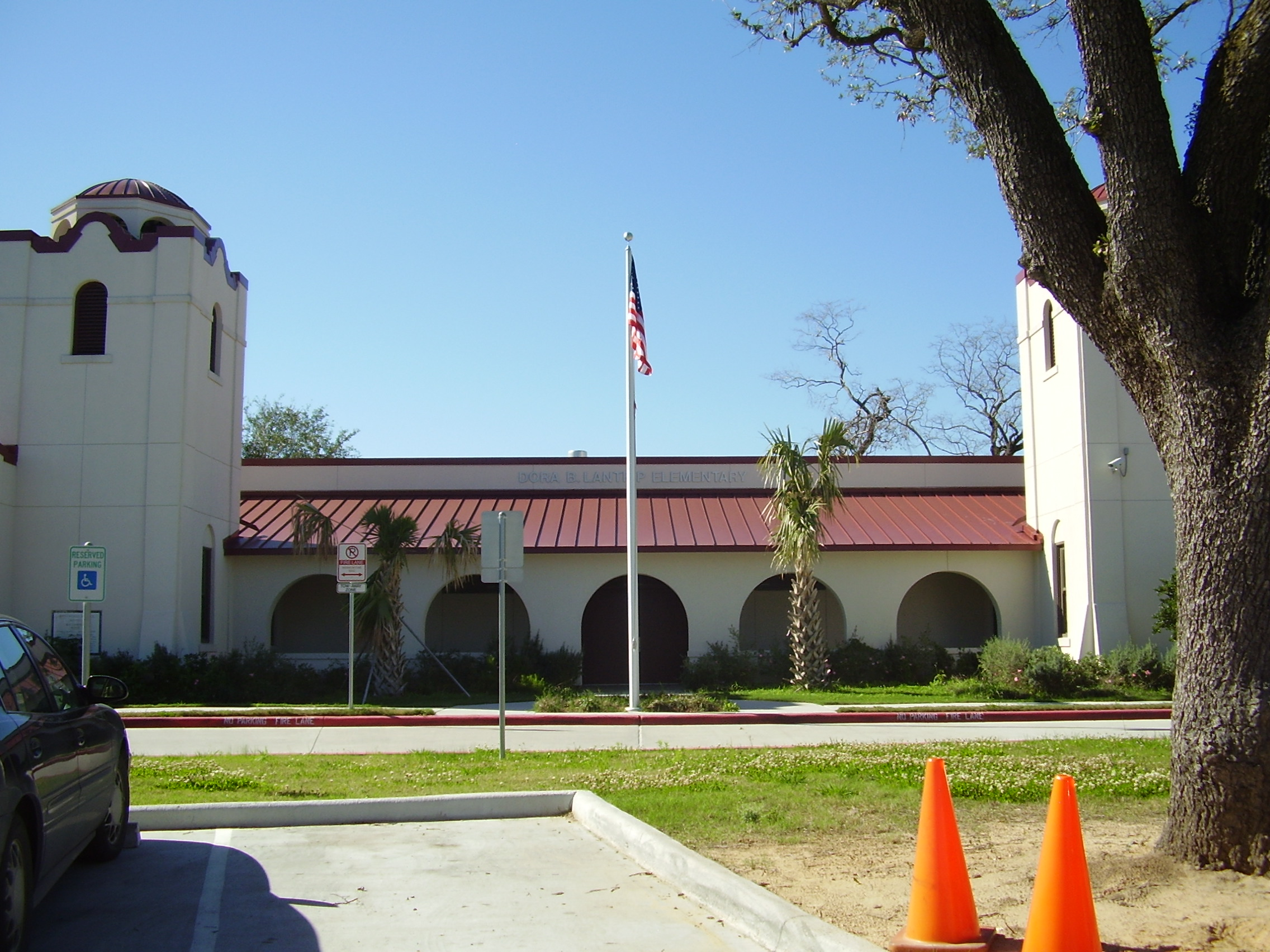
Lantrip Elementary School

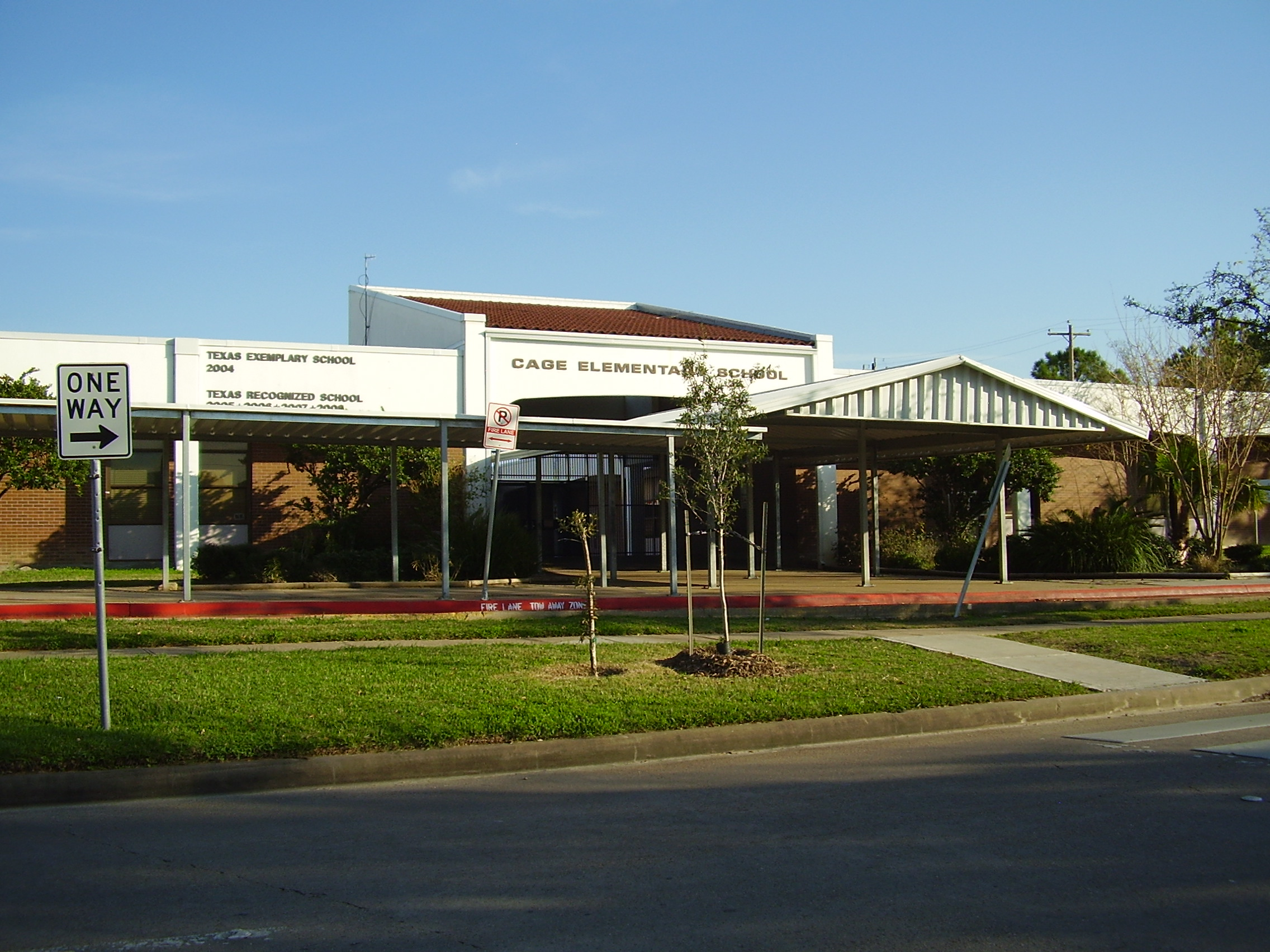
Cage Elementary School

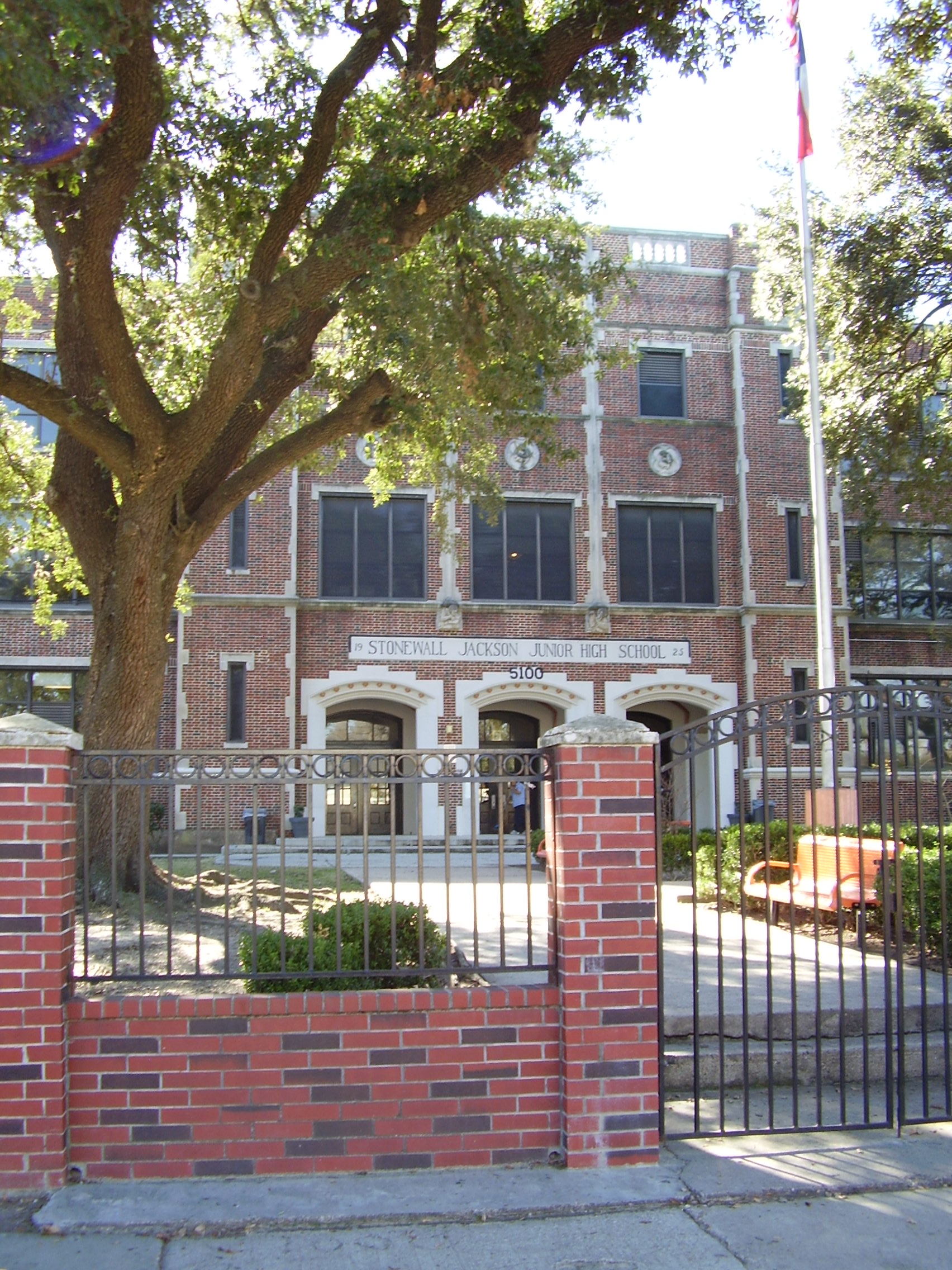
Jackson Middle School

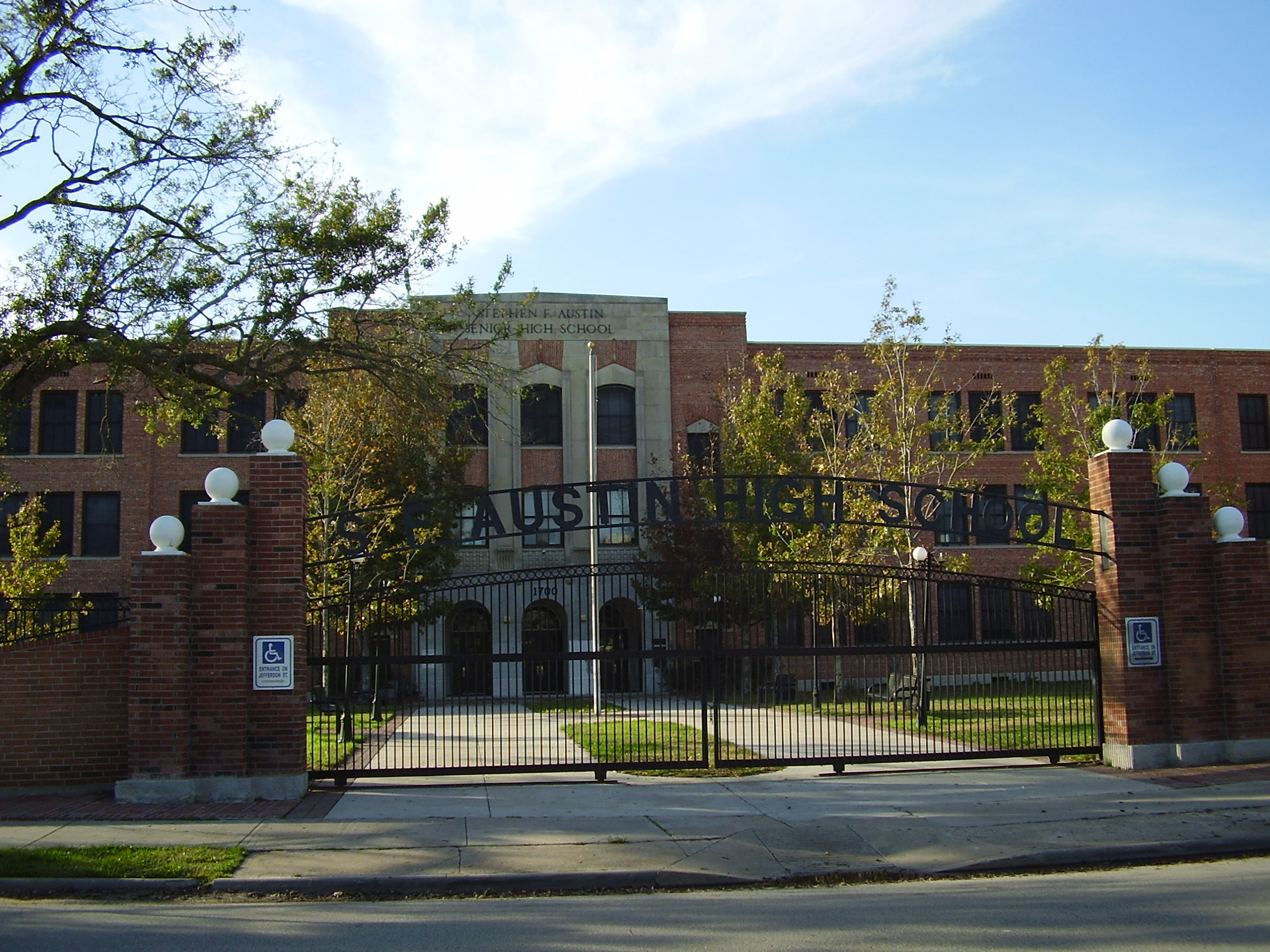
Austin High School

=== Public libraries ===
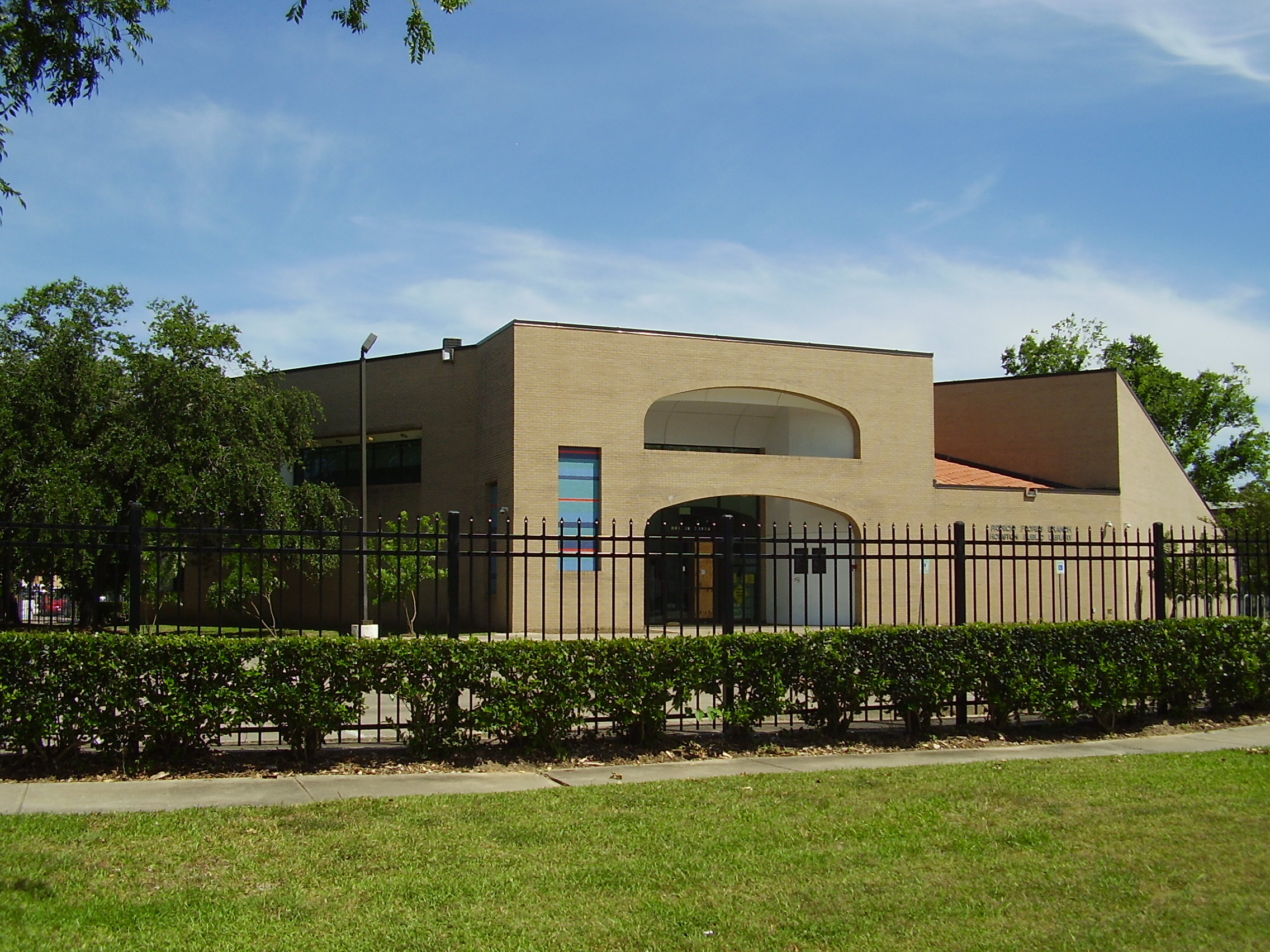
Patricio Flores Neighborhood Library

Eastwood is in close proximity to Houston Public Library's Flores Branch.

== Community Information ==
=== Eastwood Civic Association ===
The Eastwood Civic Association serves the neighborhoods of Eastwood, Broadmoor, Lawndale, W.A. Kirby, Jackson Court, Woodleigh, Eastlawn, Dissen Heights, Houston City Railroad, Suburban, L.B. Moody, Beverly Park, Eastview, Hauser, Dor Ruth, Mueller, Dixie, Georgia, and Youngmens.

The Eastwood Civic Association is composed of volunteers who donate their time and resources "to improve the quality of life for our residents; protect the value and beauty of our homes and neighborhood assets; and work with local government officials and law enforcement to protect and serve our citizens."

Since 1996, the association has hosted the Annual Historic Home Tour on the third weekend of every October that showcases architecturally significant homes and other historic landmarks in the Eastwood neighborhood.

=== Super Neighborhoods ===
Eastwood is geographically designated as part of Super Neighborhood 64 - Greater Eastwood. The elected council is composed of residents and stakeholders and serves as a forum to discuss issues and identify and implement priority projects for the area.
