= Lantrip Elementary School =

Dora B. Lantrip Elementary School
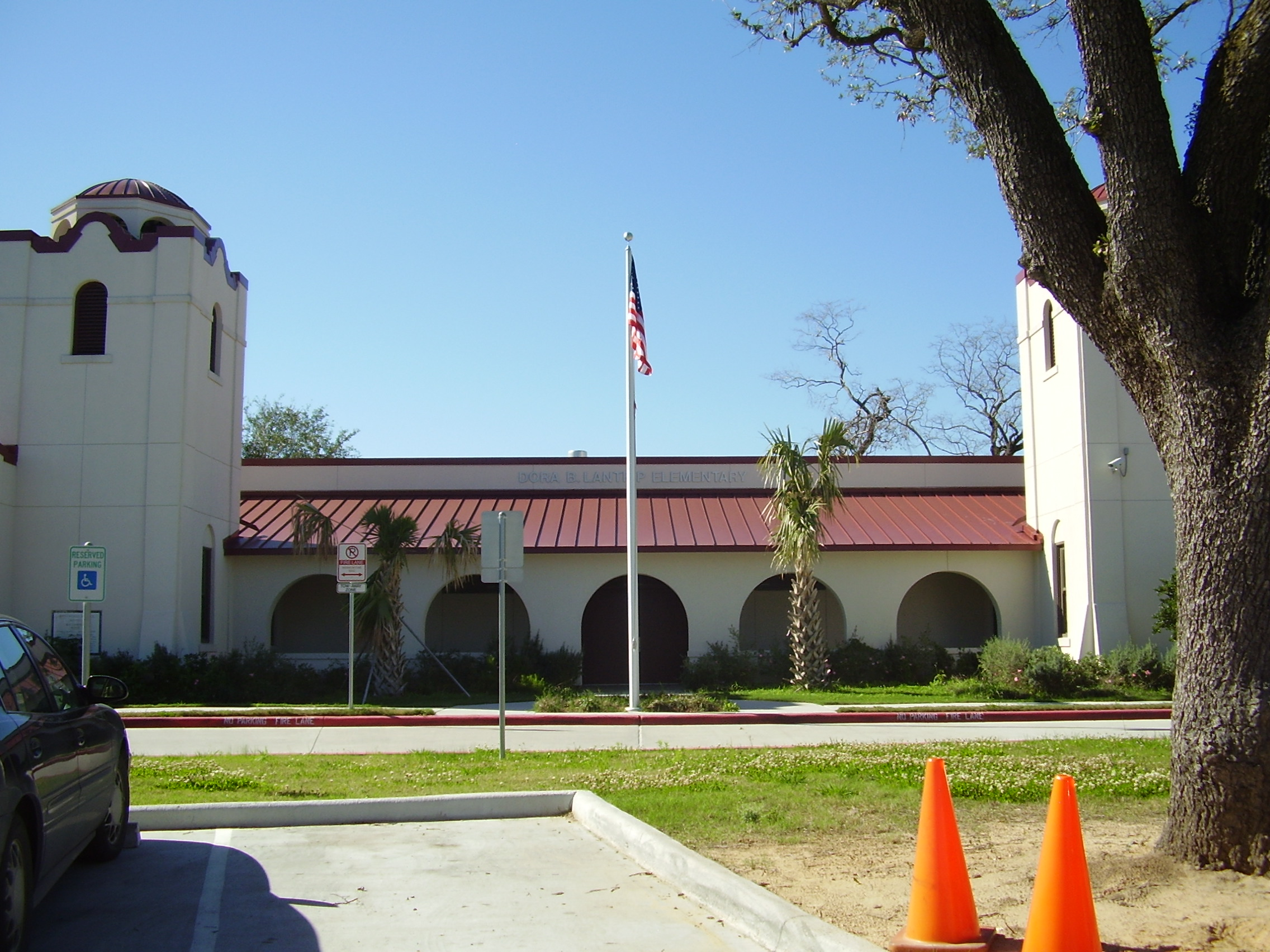

Location
- 100 Telephone Rd., Houston, TX 77023; United States; 29.740660°N 95.335322°W

Information
- Type: Elementary school
- Established: 1916
- School district: Houston Independent School District
- Grades: K–5
- Communities served: Eastwood, Second Ward, East Downtown
- Website: www.houstonisd.org/lantripes

Dora B. Lantrip Elementary School is a primary school at 100 Telephone Road in the Eastwood community in the East End region of Houston, Texas, United States. The school is within the Houston Independent School District (HISD).

The school serves a section of Eastwood. The school has the Environmental Science Magnet Program. Lantrip's building has been designated as a Texas state historic site.

== History ==
The school was originally Eastwood Elementary School. The developer of Eastwood, William A. Wilson, had deeded the land to have the school built. Lantrip first opened in 1916. The Houston school district redirected all students from Kirby School (now Cage Elementary School) to Eastwood School, but in 1925 reopened what became Cage. Eastwood School was renamed after its first principal, Dora B. Lantrip.

Lantrip was previously reserved for white children (Hispanics being categorized as white prior to 1970) but it desegregated by 1970.

By the 1970s it became a majority Mexican American school.

From 2000 to 2005 the enrollment declined, and the Eastwood area gentrified.

A new facility opened in 2007 at the school's location. The new facility designed by Sustaita Architects incorporates sections of the original building. The new building was dedicated on October 24, 2007. HISD had originally planned to completely demolish Lantrip Elementary, but preservationists convinced the district to keep the administration building and the detached, bungalow-style classroom buildings. The district demolished the newer additions and replaced them with new construction.

As part of rezoning for the 2014–2015 school year, some areas in East Downtown previously under the attendance zone of Dodson Elementary School, which closed, were rezoned to Lantrip Elementary.

Beginning in the 2016–2017 school year the elementary zoned grades at Rusk School were to be phased out, with most of Rusk's territory, including portions of East Downtown and the Second Ward, reassigned to Lantrip. PreKindergarten through grade 2 were to be phased out immediately, with 3-5 being phased out in the following five years; elementary grades for Rusk were to be phased out by fall 2019.

Effective 2026, Cage Elementary will move onto the property of Lantrip Elementary while remaining a separate institution.

== Campus ==
Lantrip, along Telephone Road and next to McKinney Street, is in the Eastwood neighborhood of the East End. Lantrip is 2 miles (3.2 km) from Downtown Houston.

Lantrip was designed by architect Maurice J. Sullivan, who intended for it to be designed more like a house and less like an institution. The school has a Spanish revival theme, using Alamo-style design. The buildings, in beige stucco with a brown trim, featured arcaded loggias, including arches; patios; and tile roof. It was the first Houston school to be laid out in a "cottage plan".

The school uses wooden lockers with inside mesh. The kindergarten classroom once featured an Ima Hogg fireplace, which was relocated to the library and preserved when the new facility was constructed.

The campus, by 2005, remained as a series of detached buildings. Four additions and renovations occurred prior to a 2007 addition which turned them into a single contiguous building.

The campus received a Texas state historical marker, dedicated by the Harris County Historical Commission on September 24, 2011.

== School uniforms ==
Students at Lantrip are required to wear school uniforms. The Texas Education Agency specifies that the parents and/or guardians of students zoned to a school with uniforms may apply for a waiver to opt out of the uniform policy so their children do not have to wear the uniforms. Parents must specify "bona fide" reasons, such as religious reasons or philosophical objections.

== Demographics ==
In the 2004–2005 school year Lantrip had about 770 students, with 95% being Hispanic or Latino.

== Feeder patterns ==
Residents zoned to Lantrip are also zoned to Yolanda Black Navarro Middle School of Excellence (formerly Jackson Middle School) in Eastwood. Most residents zoned to Lantrip are also zoned to Austin High School in Eastwood, while some are zoned to Wheatley High School in the Fifth Ward.
