= Cage Elementary School =

Elementary school in Houston, Texas

Coordinates: 29.73461°N 95.33376°W

Rufus Cage Elementary School
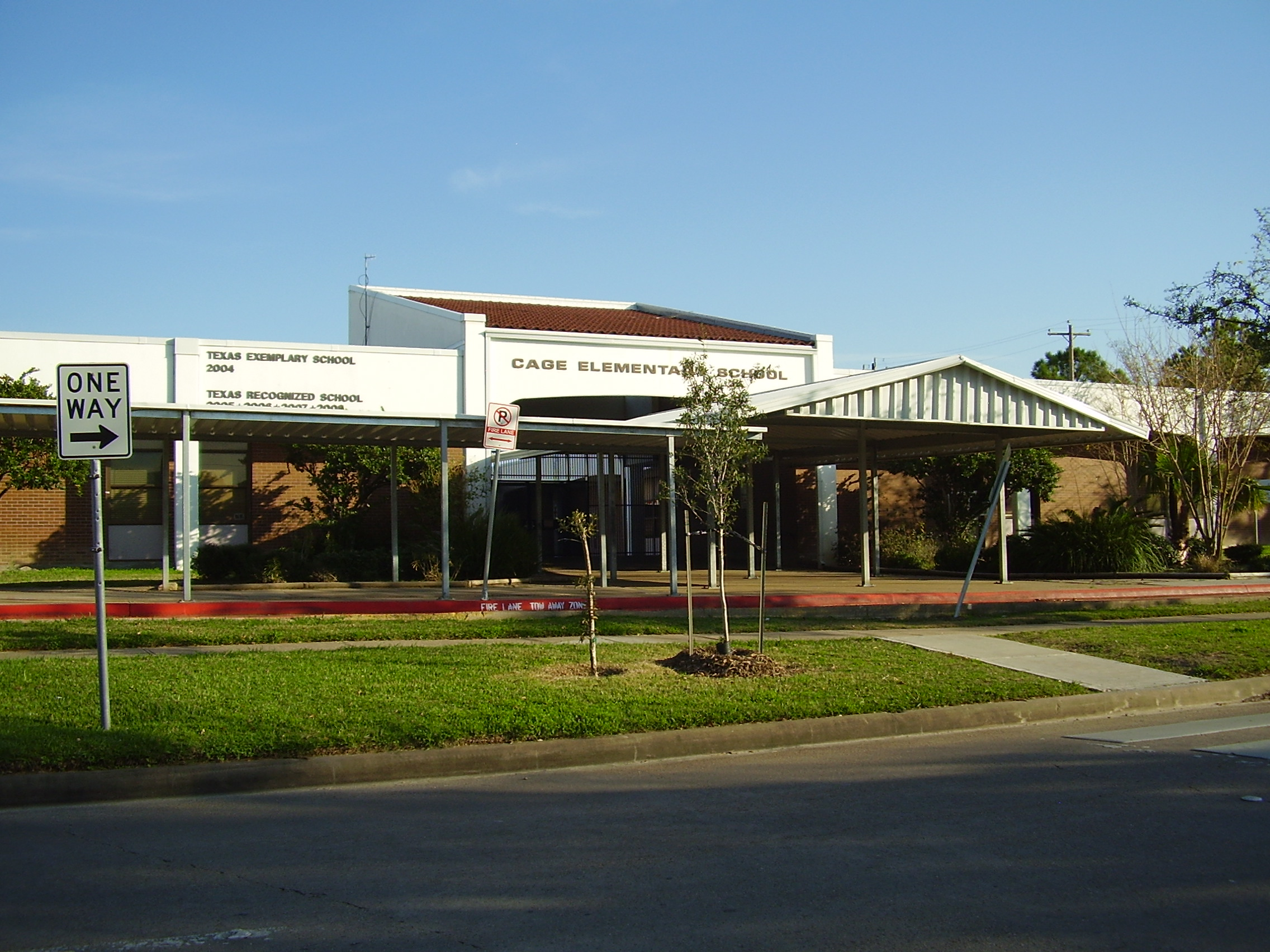
- The 1983 Cage Elementary School building

Location
- 4528 Leeland Street; Eastwood, Houston, Texas 77023; United States

Information
- Former name: Kirby School
- Type: Elementary School
- Established: 1925; 101 years ago
- Locale: Urban
- School district: Houston Independent School District
- NCES District ID: 4823640
- Educational authority: Texas Education Agency
- Superintendent: Mike Miles
- NCES School ID: 482364005999
- Principal: Deirdre Riordan
- Teaching staff: 25.80 (on an FTE basis)
- Gender: Coeducational
- Enrollment: 319 (2024-2025)
  - Pre-kindergarten: 39
  - Kindergarten: 32
  - Grade 1: 42
  - Grade 2: 40
  - Grade 3: 63
  - Grade 4: 45
  - Grade 5: 58
- Student to teacher ratio: 12.36
- Feeder to: Austin High School
- Website: cage.houstonisd.org

Rufus Cage Elementary School is an elementary school in Eastwood, a neighborhood in the East End district of Houston, Texas. It is a part of the Houston Independent School District (HISD). It serves a section of Eastwood. Founded as the Kirby School in 1902, it transitioned from a county school to a municipal school. The school, renamed after the death of the benefactor who donated land for the school, occupied a building dedicated in 1910 until its current campus opened in 1983, with the exception of the period 1914–1925, when the building was used as an apartment complex. The 1910 building is now a City of Houston historic landmark and is owned by the city government.

== History ==
=== Predecessors ===
It first opened in 1902 as the Kirby School. A man named Rufus Cage donated the land which housed the school. It moved into another building, across from the original, in 1906. In 1910 a new building opened on that site. The building, designed by Jones and Tabor company, was designed more like a school in a city than one in a rural area. The school was originally owned by Harris County, but in 1914 the City of Houston took control.

Initially the Houston school district closed Kirby School and redirected all students to Eastwood Elementary (now Lantrip Elementary School), but area parents complained. The Kirby building was repurposed into an apartment complex, and the tenants kept cattle there. The school reopened after 11 years of apartment usage.

In 1923 Cage died, and the school, which reopened in 1925, was now Cage Elementary School. Food was cooked using a kerosene stove provided by the Cage Elementary mothers' association since initially the school was not supplied with cooking equipment nor water. A cafeteria and an addition were installed in the 1940s. In the 1950s the school had 251 students. The parents opposed closure requests during that decade; the parent-teacher organization of Cage at the time had 314 persons on its membership roster. Cage was previously reserved for white children (Hispanics being categorized as white prior to 1970) but it desegregated by 1970.

=== 1983 school and current school ===
The later Cage building on Leeland Street opened in 1983. Circa 1996 Cage Elementary was overcrowded and had several temporary buildings. At that time the alternative middle school Project Chrysalis moved to the Cage campus.

Effective 2026, Cage Elementary was scheduled to move onto the property of Lantrip Elementary while remaining a separate institution.

== Old Cage building ==
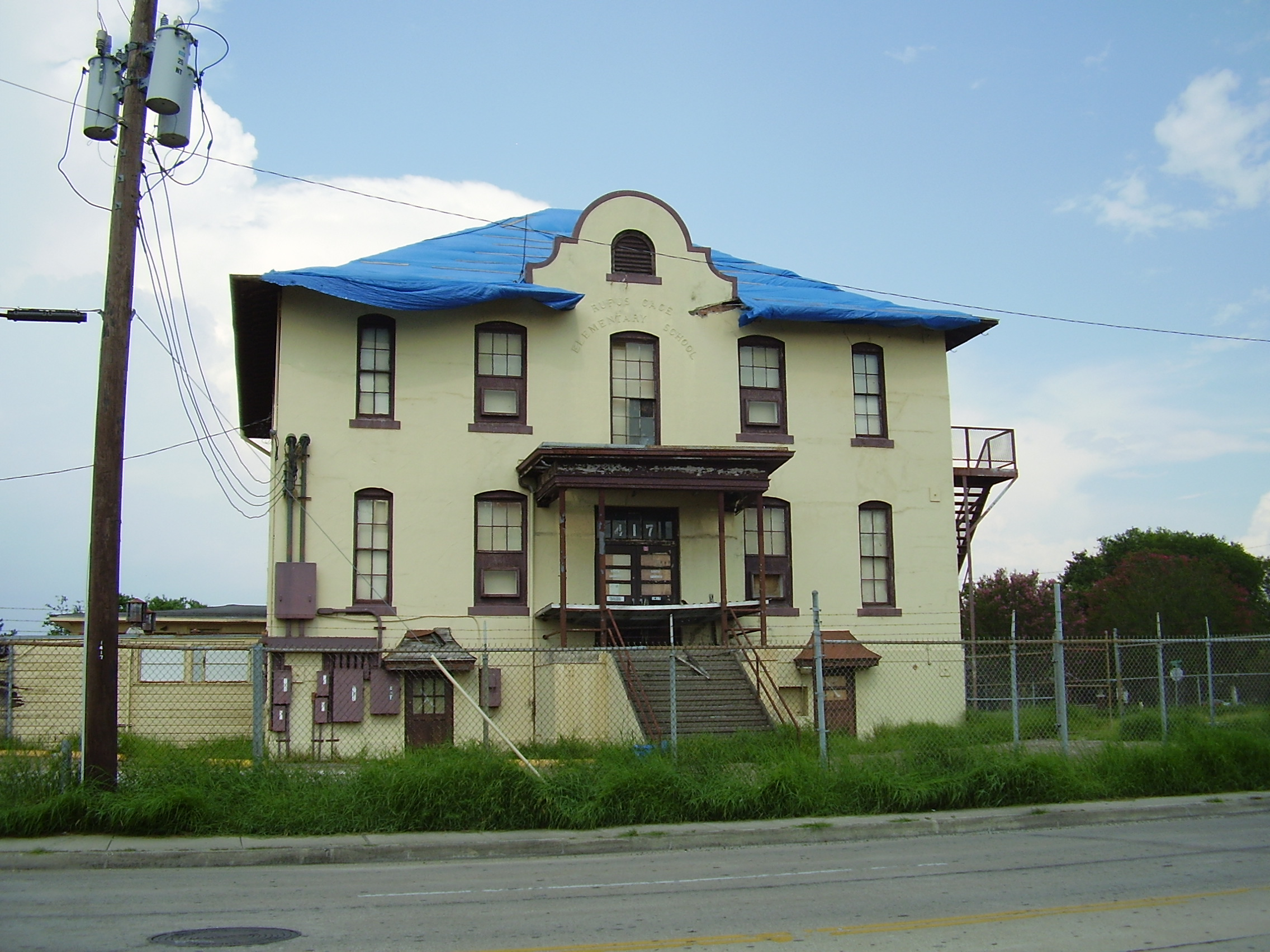
The old Rufus Cage building

Prior to 2012 HISD used the former Cage building as storage. Around 2005 a historical preservation group stated that repairs costing $400,000 were necessary to put the school in a usable condition. At a later point a storm damaged the roof.

In 2011 HISD put Cage up for sale, stating that it needed to ensure its budget would remain balanced. Area residents were concerned that HISD could sell it to a party that would demolish the building. In October 2011 several area residents asked HISD to sell the former Cage school to the City of Houston. The City of Houston offered to buy the old Cage in exchange for a right-of-way purchase credit of $100,000. HISD accepted the offer. In 2012 the City of Houston designated Cage a protected historic landmark.

Activist Lenwood Johnson, known for his advocacy for the Fourth Ward, criticized Mayor of Houston Annise Parker for seeking to preserve the original Cage Elementary while not doing enough to preserve the Fourth Ward.

== Operations ==
Circa 1996 the school allowed fifth graders with academic success to move on to Jackson Middle School (now Yolanda Navarro Middle School) in the sixth grade, while it had an in-house sixth grade program for students who previously faced academic and/or maturity issues.

== Curriculum ==
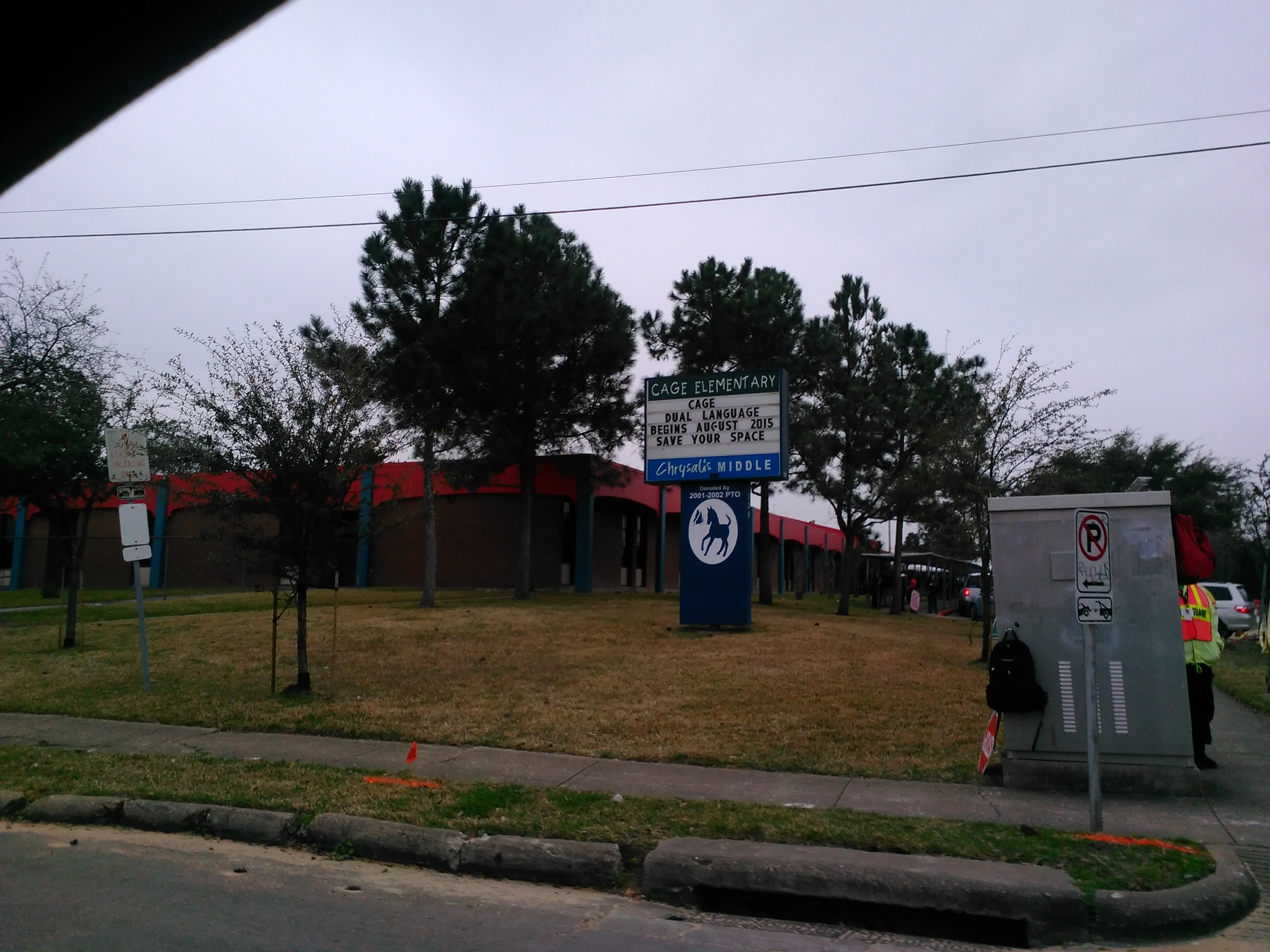
The current Cage Elementary School campus also houses the Project Chrysalis middle school program

By 2005 the school implemented "Reading Buddies", a program in which students of higher grade levels read books to students of lower grade levels. This was implemented to allow students of different education levels and ages to interact with one another.

== Feeder patterns ==
Residents zoned to Cage are also zoned to Yolanda Black Navarro Middle School of Excellence (formerly Jackson Middle School) and Austin High School.
