= Stephen F. Austin High School (Houston) =

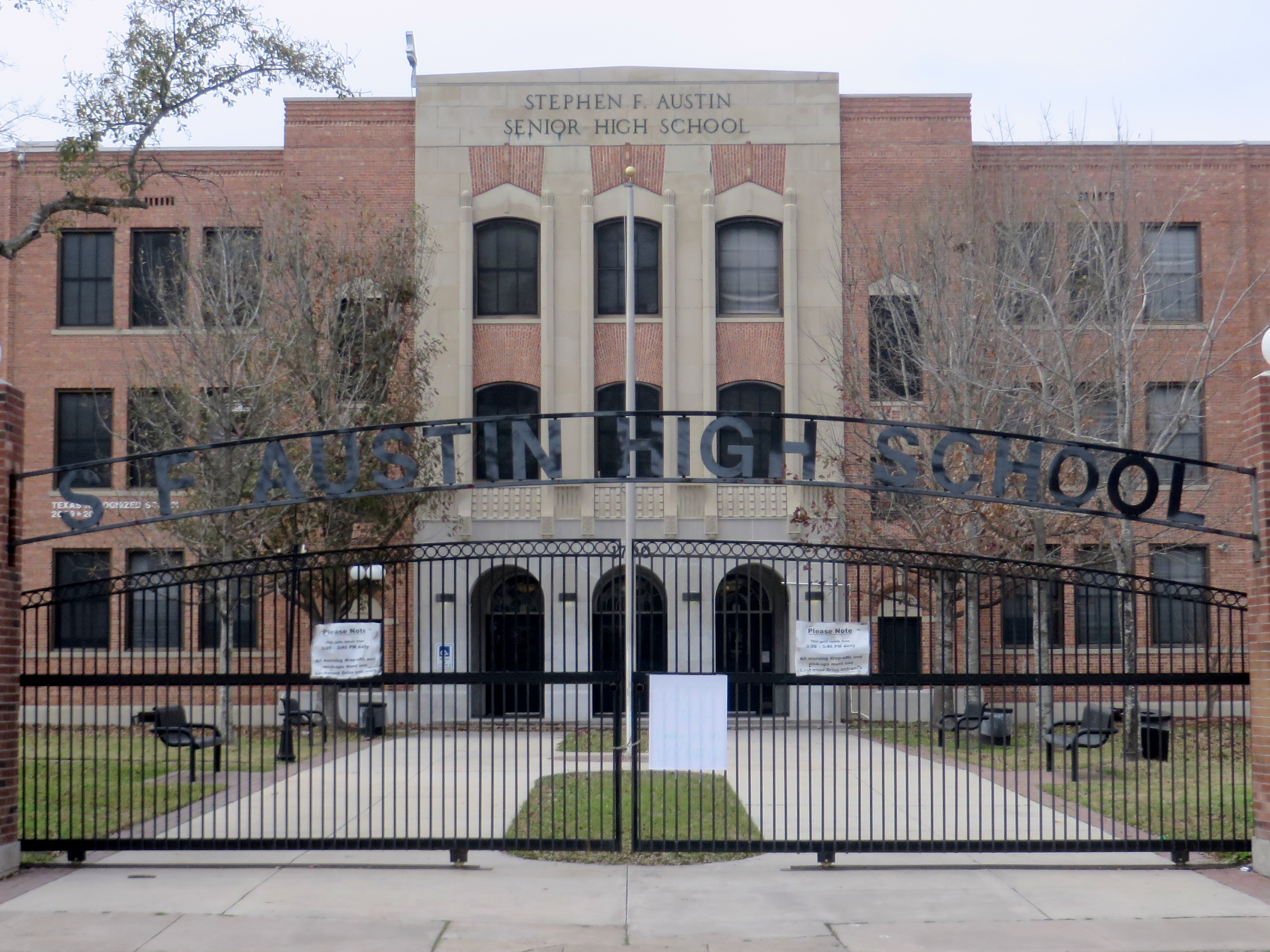

Location
- 1700 Dumble St. Houston, Texas 77023-3139; United States; 29.732°N 95.332°W

Information
- School type: Public high school
- Established: 1936
- School district: Houston Independent School District
- Principal: Steve Guerrero
- Teaching staff: 89.56 (FTE)
- Grades: 9-12
- Enrollment: 1,448 (2022-23)
- Student to teacher ratio: 16.17
- Colors: Green and White
- Athletics conference: UIL Class AAAA
- Mascot: Mustang
- Yearbook: The Corral
- Feeder schools: Cage Elementary School; Lantrip Elementary School; Others listed below
- Website: Austin High School

Stephen F. Austin High School is a secondary school located at 1700 Dumble Street in Houston, Texas, United States. The school handles grades nine through twelve and is a part of the Houston Independent School District. In 2013, the school was rated "Met Standard" by the Texas Education Agency.

The school, named after Stephen F. Austin, the "Father of Texas", is located in the East End. The neighborhood was developed in the 1920s, and the school's Art Deco architecture reflects this. The school has HISD's magnet program for Teaching Professions. The Port of Houston Maritime Academy was scheduled to come to Austin High School in August 2009.

The school is about 2 miles (3.2 km) southeast from Downtown Houston.

== History ==
Austin was first built in 1936. Austin was previously reserved for white children (Hispanics being categorized as white prior to 1970) but it desegregated by 1970. The three-story building was designed for every room to have windows for ventilation in Houston's humid climate. Air conditioning was installed circa 1970. Among other notable architectural features, Austin had a swimming pool in the basement below the gymnasium.

In 1984 Mimi Swartz of the Texas Monthly wrote that Austin High School was "not considered particularly dangerous" in comparison to other HISD schools.

=== 21 Jump Street Incident ===
By 1989 the school had experienced issues related to student absenteeism and dropouts. On Monday, October 16, 1989 two students, 16-year-old Alma Rincon and 18-year-old-Cedric Smith watched an episode of 21 Jump Street about students who protest and walk out of school. The following day the two discussed the show during an American history class; Austin High School had a lack of textbooks and scheduling conflicts. The students decided that a protest could help change this. Before the walkout, the administration learned that there would be a walkout on Monday, October 23 and principal Otila Urbina warned students to not participate. The organizers tricked the administration by rescheduling the walkout to Friday. On Friday, October 20, 1989 up to 1,000 students walked out of class and talked to reporters. One week later, on Friday October 27, HISD superintendent Joan Raymond announced that Urbina would be reassigned to administrative duties. After the incident, students received additional books. Macario Garcia, a spokesperson for the students, said that he believed that school officials may "review everything but are not going to take immediate action."

=== 1990s ===
In September 1991, Austin was one of 32 HISD schools that had capped enrollments. The school was filled to capacity and excess students had to attend other schools. In December 1991, Austin was one of the largest high schools in Texas, with 2,669 students. Due to the overcrowding, by that month Houston ISD trustees approved a plan to open a new high school in 1995 instead of in 1997.

In 1992 superintendent Frank Petruzielo asked Jose Treviño to become the principal of Austin High. Carol E. Vaughn of the Houston Chronicle stated that for Treviño, who had served as principal of others schools, "it was the "principalship" at Austin High School where he emblazoned his name."

In 1996 the school used eighteen temporary buildings, and the enrollment had increased to 3,000.

By 1997, the new high school had not been constructed; area community leaders and parents anticipated the construction of César Chávez High School, as Austin and Milby were still overcrowded. Prior to 1997 residents zoned to Furr High School also had the option to attend Austin and Milby high schools; in 1997 the school district canceled the option.

=== 21st Century ===
In the fall of 2000, Chávez opened and took most of Milby's traditional neighborhoods. In turn Milby absorbed some students from Austin. Areas that were zoned to Austin in 1998 were rezoned to Milby, In turn, Austin absorbed areas previously zoned to Furr and Yates high schools.

In 2002 Treviño was promoted to the southeast district regional superintendent. In 2003 Linda Llorente, an Austin High alumna, became the principal.

In 2005, the administration decided to open a new music program. A new Band Director was hired to build a new band which was given the nickname "Sonic Boom". In 2010, the Sonic Boom was selected out of more than 80 applicants nationwide to compete in the Home Depot Center Battle of the Bands, sponsored by Vh1 Save the Music Foundation. At the end of the day, the Grand Champion of the Battle of the Bands in Los Angeles was Stephen F. Austin's Sonic Boom who also headlined the HEB Holiday (Thanksgiving Day) Parade in Downtown.

In 2007, a Johns Hopkins University study commissioned by the Associated Press included Austin in a "dropout factory" list of 42 Houston-area high schools; a "dropout factory" school is where at least 40% of the entering freshman class does not make it to their senior year.

In the 2000s, property values around the school increased. This created the large student population decrease as gentrification made the surrounding area more expensive. This led to the demotion of the school from 5A to 4A as per the University Interscholastic League ranking.

By 2018 a reconstruction project began where much of the building, except for historically significant sections, was rebuilt. The Temporary Learning Center (TLC) accommodated students during the process.

As of 2020 Orlando Reyna was the principal.

== Academic performance ==
In 1995 the Texas Assessment of Knowledge and Skills (TAAS) passing rate was 19.8%. In the 1990s the school's reported dropout rate declined from 14% to 0.3%, and because of that the Texas Education Agency gave the school an "exemplary" rating. In 2001 the TAAS passing rate was 90.5% and the official dropout rate was about 12%. The TEA gave Austin High a "low-performing" rating in late 2003. By 2003 accusations had been made that Austin High's dropout rate data was falsified.

== Demographics ==
For the 2022-23 school year:

- African American: 5.8%
- Hispanic: 92.6%
- White: 1.0%
- American Indian: 0.0%
- Asian: 0.1%
- Pacific Islander: 0.1%
- Two or More Races: 0.4%
- Economically Disadvantaged: 97.4%

In 2007 the school had 304 12th grade (senior students). That year a counselor estimated that 250 of them had permission to leave Austin High during the school day, and many of those students had outside jobs.

In 1940 less than 1% of the student body of the school was of Mexican origin.

== Campus ==
In 2012 Richard Connelly of the Houston Press ranked Austin as the most architecturally beautiful high school campus in Greater Houston. Connelly said that "Another in the classic mode, with an entrance that just says "high school." And we don't mean the gate."

== Neighborhoods served by Austin ==
Several areas inside the 610 Loop that are east of Downtown, including the area known as the East End, are zoned to Austin; several East End subdivisions such as the Second Ward, Eastwood, Idylwood, East View, Riverview, Forest Hill, Hampshire Oaks, Simms Woods, Houston Country Club Place, Woodleigh, Sunnylan, Broadmoor, Central Park, and some of Magnolia Park, are zoned to Austin. In addition a section of East Downtown is zoned to Austin.

== Academics ==
The school is ranked 72 by U.S News in the state due to its offered AP courses and supportive staff.

=== Magnet program ===
Dr. Ronald McIntire and Dr. Mark Ginsburg developed Austin's magnet program, the High School for Teaching Professions. Due to a lack of Hispanic teachers in HISD at the time, HISD established the magnet program at Austin High School in order to have more Hispanic teachers in the schools; in 1984 7% of HISD's teachers were Hispanic even though 31% of its students were Hispanic. As of 1984 the magnet program required four years of English, three years each of social studies, science, and mathematics, and two years each of a foreign language and physical education. The classes sizes had numbers of students below the HISD class average of 30.

In 1984 Swartz reported that in the magnet school many students chose not to take liberal arts electives but instead those related to vocational studies, such as speech class. Swartz also reported difficulties with trying to balance out the demands of brighter students with those who had more difficulty with the course material. She concluded that "there are signs that all is not well".

== Athletics ==
=== State Titles ===
- Boys Basketball
  - 1961(4A), 1964(4A)
- Boys Track
  - 1946(All)

==== State Finalist ====
- Football
  - 1954(4A)

==== National Championship ====
Marching Band 2010

== Dress code ==
As of 2015 Austin students no longer wear uniforms.

Austin High School students previously wore school uniforms. As of the 2009-2010 school year each student wore a polo shirt of a color depending on the student's year of estimated graduation. Freshmen wore black, Sophomores wore blue, Juniors wore maroon, and Seniors wore green. All students had khaki bottoms.

The Texas Education Agency specified that the parents and/or guardians of students zoned to a school with uniforms may apply for a waiver to opt out of the uniform policy so their children do not have to wear the uniform; parents must specify "bona fide" reasons, such as religious reasons or philosophical objections.

== Transportation ==
Houston ISD provides school buses for students who live more than two miles away from the school or who have major obstacles between their houses and the school. Students are eligible if they are zoned to Austin or are in the Austin magnet program.

Three METRO bus stops (Polk Street @ Dumble Street, Telephone Road @ Dumble Street, and Ernestine Street @ Coyle Street) are located near the school. Bus line 36 stops at Polk @ Dumble, and bus line 40 stops at Telephone @ Dumble. Bus line 42 stops at Ernestine @ Coyle. Telephone @ Dumble is the stop closest to the school.

== Feeder patterns ==
Elementary schools that feed into Austin include:

- Cage
- Carrillo
- Franklin
- Briscoe (partial)
- Brookline (partial)
- Burnet (partial)
- Gallegos (partial)
- J. P. Henderson (partial)
- Lantrip (partial)
- Peck (partial)
- Tijerina (partial)

Middle schools that feed into Austin include:

- Yolanda Black Navarro Middle School of Excellence (formerly Stonewall Jackson Middle School) (partial)
- Deady Middle School (partial)
- Edison Middle School (partial)

== In popular culture ==
In the 1986 film The George McKenna Story, this school was the location for George Washington High.

== Notable alumni ==
- Robert Gallegos, politician
- Eva Guzman - Former Justice of the Texas Supreme Court and prospective candidate for Texas Attorney General in the 2022 election cycle.
- Jody Miller - Artist/Political Editor/Writer for the Houston Voice
- Ken Spain - professional basketball player
- Joel Youngblood - Major League Baseball Player
