= Eastwood Academy =

Public secondary school in Texas, US

- Eastwood Academy Charter High School

Location
- 1315 Dumble Street; Houston, Texas; United States; 29.7356°N 95.3285°W

Information
- Type: Public Secondary
- Motto: Where it's cool to be smart!
- Established: 1999; 27 years ago
- School district: Houston Independent School District
- Category: Houston ISD
- School Improvement Officer: Jennifer Topper
- Principal: Natasha Cruz-Jefferson
- Teaching staff: 25.00 (FTE)
- Grades: 9-12
- Gender: Co-educational
- Enrollment: 427 (2017-18)
- Student to teacher ratio: 17.08
- Campus: Urban
- Color
- Athletics: Eastwood Boxers
- Mascot: Boxer
- TEA Rating: Exemplary
- Website: eastwood.houstonisd.org
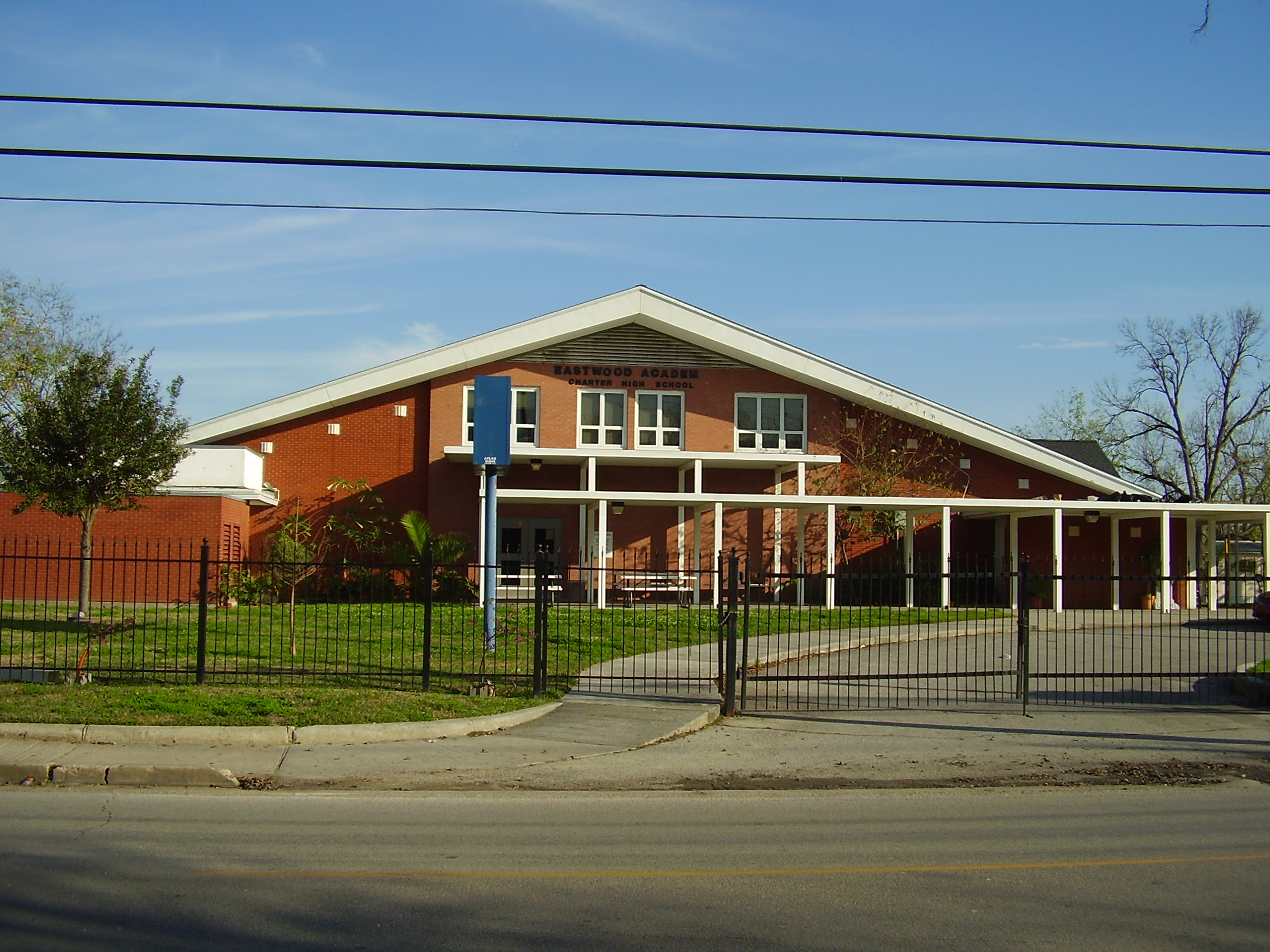

Eastwood Academy is a secondary school in the Eastwood neighborhood of the East End, Houston, Texas, United States. The school is a member of the Houston Independent School District and is a school-of-choice for residents in the city of Houston.

Eastwood Academy has been an "exemplary" high school by the Texas Education Agency since 2008. It was nominated as a Blue Ribbon School in 2010 and received the award officially in 2011.

== History ==
Eastwood was built in 1954 as a Baptist Church before the Houston Independent School District bought the property and admitted the school as an internal charter in 2001. The 22,000-square-foot (2,000 m^{2}) building was renovated and expanded for "re-adaptive" use for 175 students. The renovation included administrative offices, library, cafeteria, classrooms, science laboratories, computer laboratories and a multi-purpose room with a stage. Additionally, a new library was built around 2018 and included a new multi-purpose space, a makerspace, and a computer repair room.

== Student body ==
In 2006 most of the students were of Mexican and Central American ancestry, of low income backgrounds, and had parents who had immigrated to the United States shortly prior.

== Academics ==
Eastwood Academy offers Advanced Placement courses and Dual-Credit courses (through the Houston Community College system).

Advanced Placement courses include: Statistics, Calculus AB/BC, Biology, Chemistry, Physics 1, Environmental Science, English Language and Composition, English Literature and Composition, Spanish Language and Culture, Spanish Literature and Culture, Human Geography, World History, U.S. History, European History, Art History, Studio Art, Computer Science A, U.S. Government and Politics, and Macroeconomics. Dual Credit courses include: English 1301 and 1302, Psychology 2301, Sociology 2301, Economics 2301, Government 2301, and Speech 1315. Along with these courses, students are encouraged to self-study or seek assistance for AP examinations not available as a class through the school (such as Comparative Government and Politics) or not being taken as a course by the student.

== Operations ==
In 2006, the school sought grants and donations from corporations so it could install new technology because there was reduced governmental funding for high schools with lower student enrollments.

== Transportation ==
In 2006 most students walked or used bicycles since the school did not have school bus services.

== Athletics and Clubs ==
Eastwood Academy formerly offered volleyball and rugby through local divisions. However, the school continues to have a soccer team that participates in a local division. Due to the small size of the school, Eastwood Academy students that wish to participate in other athletic sports must do so through the school they are zoned to.

Eastwood Academy offers several clubs that students can participate in. These include clubs such as the National Honor Society, Science National Honor Society and Debate. In addition, students are able to start their own clubs, after approval by staff via a form.

== Graduation and college acceptance ==
Eastwood Academy has averaged, over the past seven years, a 99.7% graduation rate. In some cases juniors (11th graders) are able to graduate early because they have completed the required coursework earlier than their peers (3-5% of students each year). 100% of each graduating class has been accepted to college since 2007.
