= Idylwood, Houston =

Neighborhood of Houston, Texas

Coordinates: 29.721°N 95.310°W

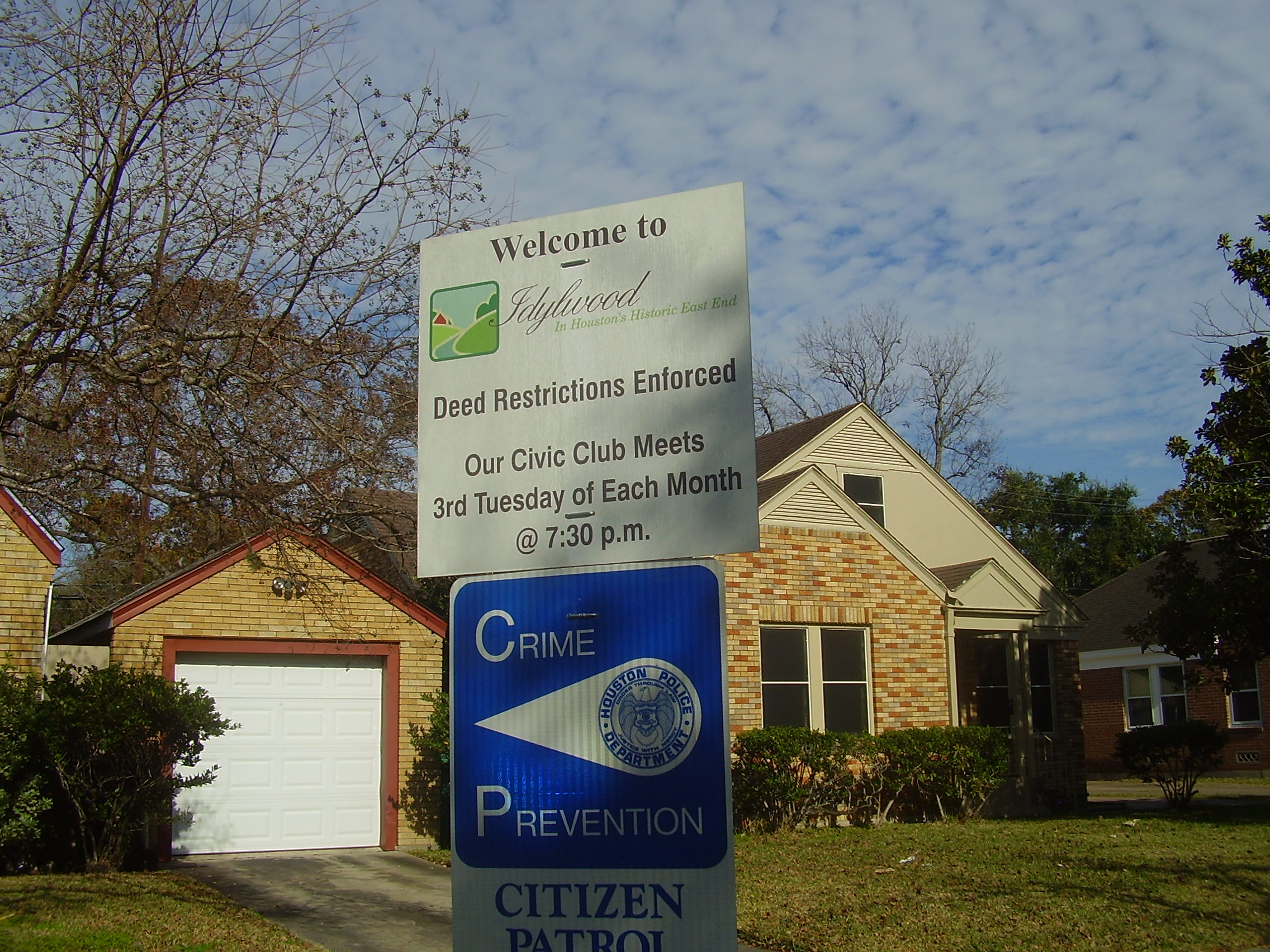
Idylwood

Idylwood is a historic neighborhood in the southeastern part of the I-610 loop in Houston, Texas. It is the most expensive neighborhood in the East End; as of 2021, its houses were priced between $295,000 and $679,900. It currently has approximately 340 homes. Bill England, a redeveloper in the East End area, stated in 2004 that Idylwood appealed to buyers who are priced out of houses located in the cities of Bellaire and West University Place.

== History ==
Idylwood was developed in the 1930s. Richard Connelly of the Houston Press said "like most of these underrated [Houston neighborhoods]," Idylwood "watched helplessly as development trended elsewhere" as more prominent development appeared west of Downtown Houston instead of southeast of Downtown Houston.

From 1998 to 2003, houses in Idylwood appreciated 10% per year.

According to the neighborhood's National Register of Historic Places Registration Form, development "which began in 1928, was largely complete by the early 1960s". Alterations since then have been minimal, with very few new builds. Many of the area's earliest residents were middle-class, with many working for "nearby industries along Telephone Road, Harrisburg Road, and the ship channel". As recently as 2009, only 35 new homes had been built since 1950.

Idylwood is home to several architect-designed houses. Notable Houston architects such as Allen R. Williams, Jr., S. R.. Slaughter, and Harry A. Turner, amongst others, designed homes that still stand today in Idylwood.

In 2010 the Houston Press ranked Idylwood one of the "Five Most Underrated Neighborhoods In Houston." The neighborhood has a strong civic club that meets monthly. They work hard to preserve the character and safety of the neighborhood. They state that the neighborhood is a place where "neighbors become friends and community thrives".

== Cityscape ==
Idlywood is inside the 610 Loop and southeast of Downtown Houston. The neighborhood is bounded by the Brays Bayou, the Wortham Golf Course, and the Villa de Matel, a Roman Catholic convent and basilica. Forest Park Lawndale, a cemetery, lies on the other side of the Brays Bayou. The neighborhood features some of the few rolling hills located within the City of Houston. As of 2004, at a certain point of time, six to nine houses are on sale, and sales conclude quickly. In 2009 Richard Connelly of the Houston Press said that the classic-style houses in Idylwood were "affordable."

Early advertisements dating back to 1928 for the neighborhood described it as "situated in the seclusion of a forest of glowing pines, oaks, hickory and gum trees, amidst a succession of gently sloping hills and glens, bordering the quiet waters of beautiful Brays Bayou".

Anjali Athavaley of the Houston Chronicle said that flooding is not a significant problem for Idylwood residents. In 2001 Tropical Storm Allison affected some houses located in proximity to North MacGregor Way. The houses primarily consist of cottage bungalows. Idlywood is in proximity to the Texas Medical Center, the Houston Museum District, Hermann Park, the University of Houston, and Rice University.

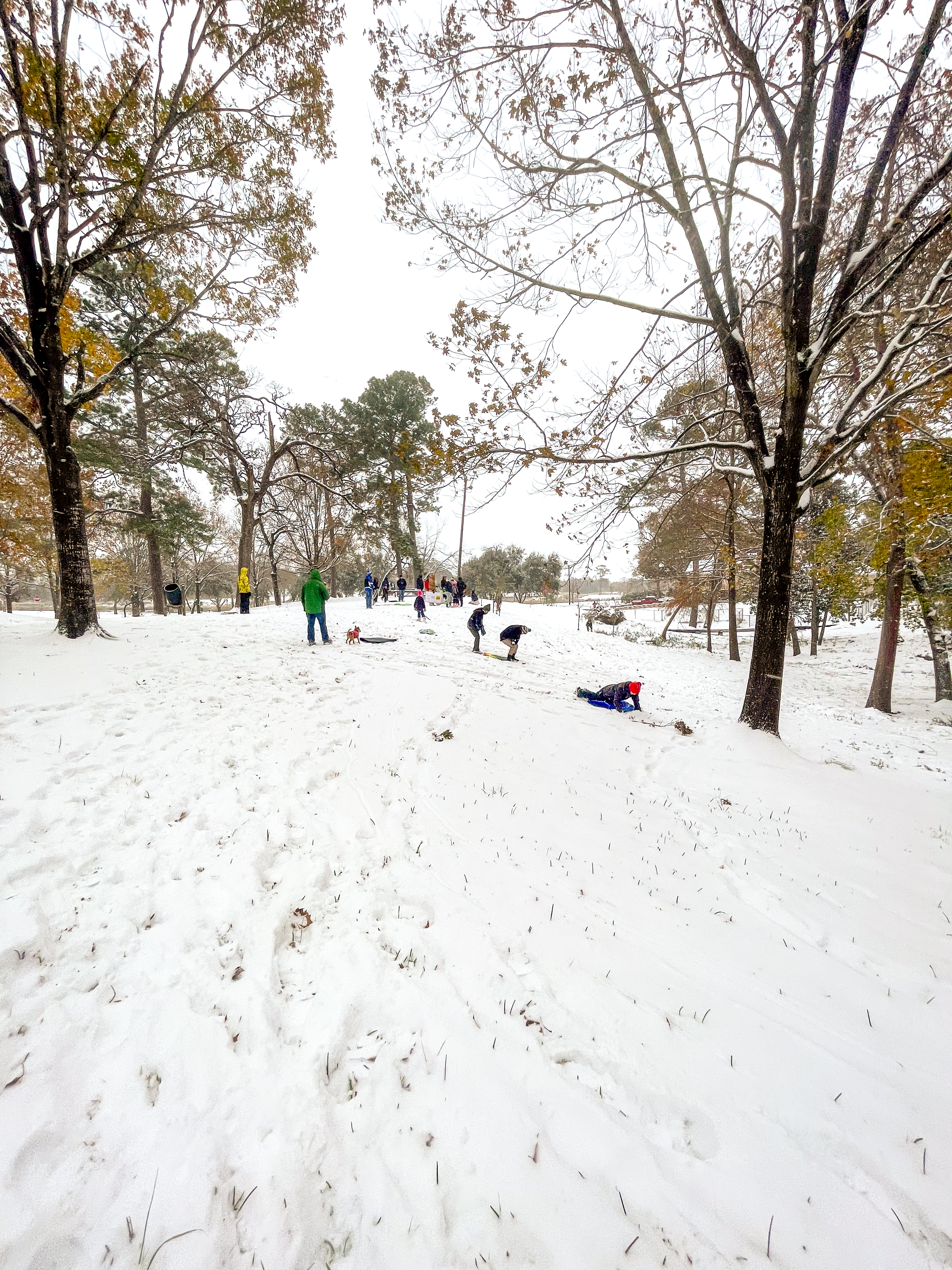
Idylwood's hilly landscape, seen during winter storm Enzo

== Government and infrastructure ==
Idylwood is in Houston City Council District I.

The Harris Health System (formerly Harris County Hospital District) designated the Ripley Health Center for the ZIP code 77023. In 2000 Ripley was replaced by the Gulfgate Health Center. The designated public hospital is Ben Taub General Hospital in the Texas Medical Center.

== Education ==
Idylwood is within the Houston Independent School District.

Idylwood is zoned to J.P. Henderson Elementary School, Navarro Middle School (formerly Jackson Middle School), and Austin High School.

== Parks and recreation ==
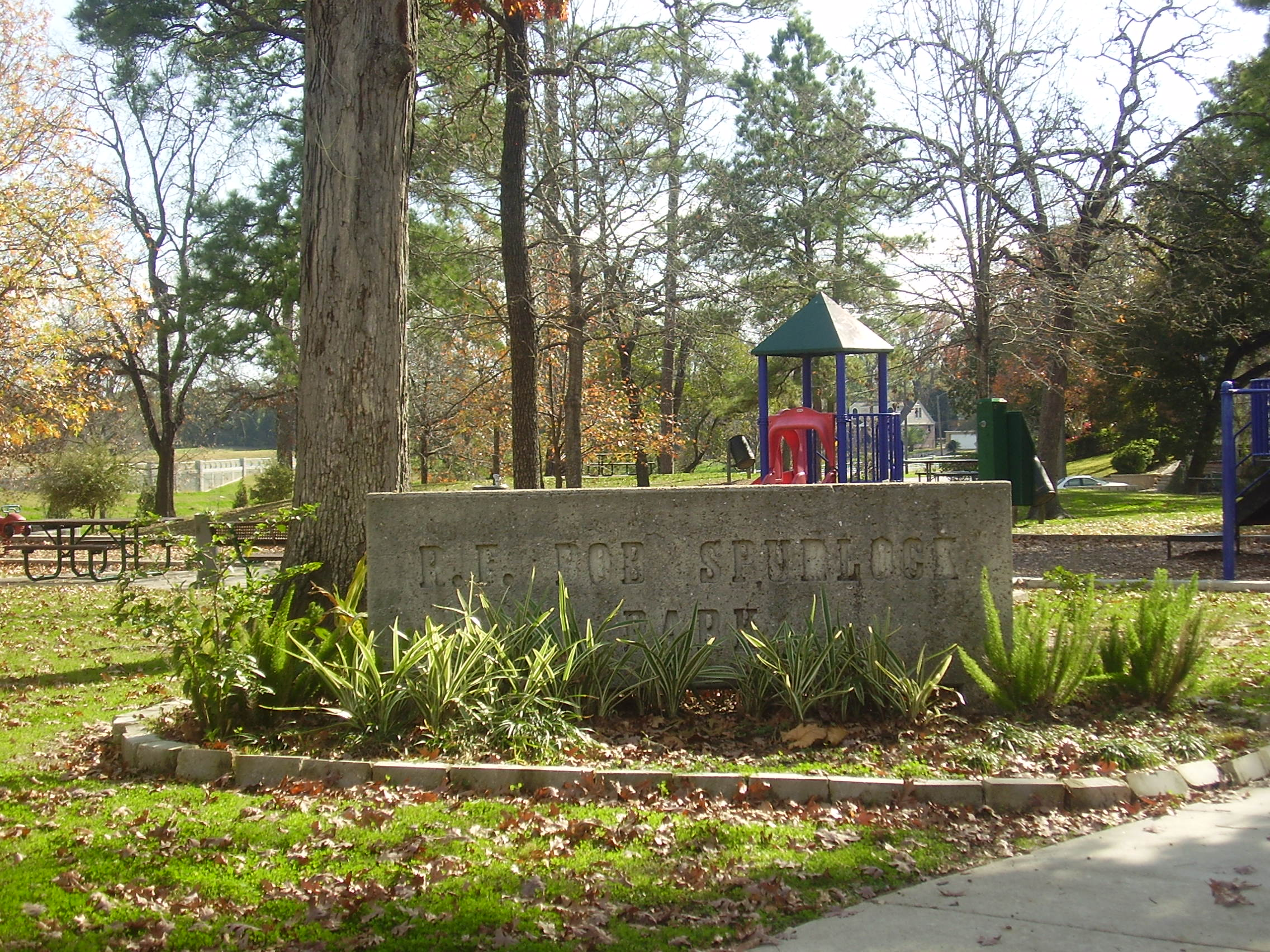
R. F. Bob Spurlock Park

Spurlock Park, operated by the City of Houston, is located within Idylwood. The park is named for Robert “Bob” Spurlock who was the Convention Judge for Harris County, and oversaw all voting results during elections.
