= Tellepsen Builders =

- Type: General Contractors
- Industry: General Contracting; Pre-Construction & Construction Services; Construction Management
- Founded: 1909
- Founder: Tom Tellepsen
- Headquarters: Houston, USA
- Area served: Greater Houston Area
- Key people: Chairman & CEO: Howard Tellepsen, Jr.
- Number of employees: 400
- Website: Tellepsen Builders Company Website

Tellepsen Builders is a construction company founded by Tom Tellepsen in Houston, Texas in 1909. The company has been family owned and operated for four generations, and was created during a period when Houston was rapidly expanding. Tellepsen Builders has been recognized as a safety leader in the construction field, and was recently noted for completing more than 4.5 million man-hours with no time lost due to injury over the past four years. The Houston Business Journal has awarded Tellepsen Builders its Landmark Award for Houston-area projects numerous times, and the company has been the recipient of the "Houston's Greatest" award, among many others.

== First generation ==
Tom Tellepsen founded Tellepsen Builders in 1909. The first Tellepsen Builders offices were built in Houston in 1921. The company's first notable project was the Miller Outdoor Theatre in 1922, followed by the Rice University Chemistry Building in 1923. In 1925, the company began work on Houston's first 10-story hotel at Texas Avenue and La Branch Street. The company constructed the Palmer Memorial Episcopal Church in 1927 and the Episcopal Church of the Redeemer in 1932. In 1929 Tom incorporated, changing from "Tom Tellepsen, General contractor" to Tellepsen Construction Company.

His former home at 4518 Park Drive, located in the historic neighborhood of Eastwood, Houston, was built in 1916 by Tom and his wife Ingeborg. The style of the house is an architecturally distinct "airplane bungalow", also known as a "hangar craftsman." The home features large windows and deep eaves, characteristic of the Craftsman style homes.

== Second generation ==
Tom's son, Howard Tellepsen, became president of the Tellepsen Construction Company in 1940. In the 1940s and 1950s the Tellepsen Construction Company was awarded many projects that have become Houston landmarks, such as Ellington Field, Annunciation Greek Orthodox Cathedral, Texas Children's Hospital, St. Luke's Episcopal Hospital, the Falcon Dam, and the Melrose Building. The company was involved with the construction of the Shamrock Hotel. At the time of its grand opening on St. Patrick's Day, 1949, the Shamrock Hotel was the largest hotel in the United States.

During Howard's tenure, he served as president of the Houston County Chamber of Commerce and was the youngest ever chairman of the Houston Ship Channel (now Port Authority). Howard was a board member for the Texas A&M Research Foundation, served on the chair and the board of the Texas State Board of Hospitals, and was the fundraising chairman for Houston's United Way, overseeing a time when more than 100% of United Way fundraising goals were met.

== Third generation ==
Howard Tellepsen Jr., succeeded his father and is currently the third-generation Tellepsen to serve as CEO of Tellepsen Builders. Tellepsen contracts during this time included American Retirement Corporation, MetroNational Corporation, Memorial Hermann Healthcare System, Methodist Healthcare System, Episcopal Diocese of Texas, ExxonMobil Exploration, Reliant Energy, Sterling Bank, and Texas Medical Center.

== Fourth generation ==
After 100 years, Tellepsen is still family owned and operated by Howard Jr. and his four sons, Tadd, Tellef, Trent, and Trevor.

== Notable Houston projects ==
=== Churches ===
- Prince of Peace Catholic Community: Worship center with seating for 1,400 featuring massive wood beams and exposed wood decking
- St. Martin's Episcopal Church: Worship center with customized wood pews and gray slate floors with seating for 1,400
- First Baptist Church, Pasadena: Two-story multi-purpose building to house educational, fellowship and worship activities including a central gathering area and worship space that seats 1,000
- Lakewood Church: Complete renovation of former Compaq Center into Joel Osteen's new worship center with accommodations for 16,000. Lakewood Church is the second largest Christian worship center in the United States.

=== Educational facilities ===
- Rice Chemistry Building
- Pasadena High School
- Channelview High School

=== Healthcare ===
- Memorial Hermann Professional Office Building: Modernization and remodeling of the existing fifty-two-year-old medical facility located in the Texas Medical Center
- Memorial Northwest Hospital Medical Office Building: Six-story medical office building and a seven-and-a-half level parking garage
- Methodist Community Health Care Center: Three-story health care center located in Sugar Land with accompanying four-story medical office building

=== Hospitality ===
- Marriott Courtyard Hotel
- Houston Country Club Renovations
- Bentwater Yacht Club: One-story yacht club located on Lake Conroe

=== Interiors ===
- Coastal Banc Headquarters: Designed to resemble a lighthouse on the Texas Gulf Coast
- Reliant Energy Plaza
- Splitrock Services, Inc.
- Williams Communications National Technical Research Center

=== Retirement communities ===
- The Terrace Program
- The ARC Program
- Pinehaven I & II

== Project awards ==
- St. Martin's Episcopal Church: ASA, 2004 Project of the Year
- Splitrock Services, Inc.: APEX IV, 2000 Best Interior Project Over 50,000 SF
- Methodist Community Health Care Center: APEX IV, 2000 Best Healthcare Project Over $10 Million
- Memorial Hermann Professional Office Building: APEX IV, 2000 Best Renovation/ Remodel Project
- Pasadena High School Additions & Renovations: APEX IV, 2000 Best Education Project Over $10 Million
- Coastal Banc Headquarters: APEX III, 1998 Best Interior Project Over 50,000 SF
- Lakewood Church: ASA Project of the Year, 2006 Project of the Year Over $15 Million
