= Lockwood/Eastwood station =

Light rail station in Houston, Texas

Lockwood/Eastwood

General information
- Location: Harrisburg Blvd and Hagerman Street; Houston, Texas
- Coordinates: 29°44′37.2″N 95°19′47.1″W
- Owner: METRO
- Line: Green Line
- Platforms: 2 island platforms
- Tracks: 2

Construction
- Structure type: Surface
- Accessible: yes

History
- Opened: May 23, 2015

Services
Preceding station	METRORail	Following station
Coffee Plant/Second Ward toward Theater District	Green Line	Altic/Howard Hughes toward Magnolia Park Transit Center
Location

Lockwood/Eastwood is a light rail station in Houston, Texas on the METRORail system. It is served by the Green Line and is located on Harrisburg Boulevard at Hagerman Street in the East End. The station is named for nearby Lockwood Drive as well as Eastwood Park.

Lockwood/Eastwood station opened on May 23, 2015 as part of the Green Line's first phase.
