= East End, Houston =

District in Houston, Texas, United States

Coordinates: 29.7492°N 95.3426°W

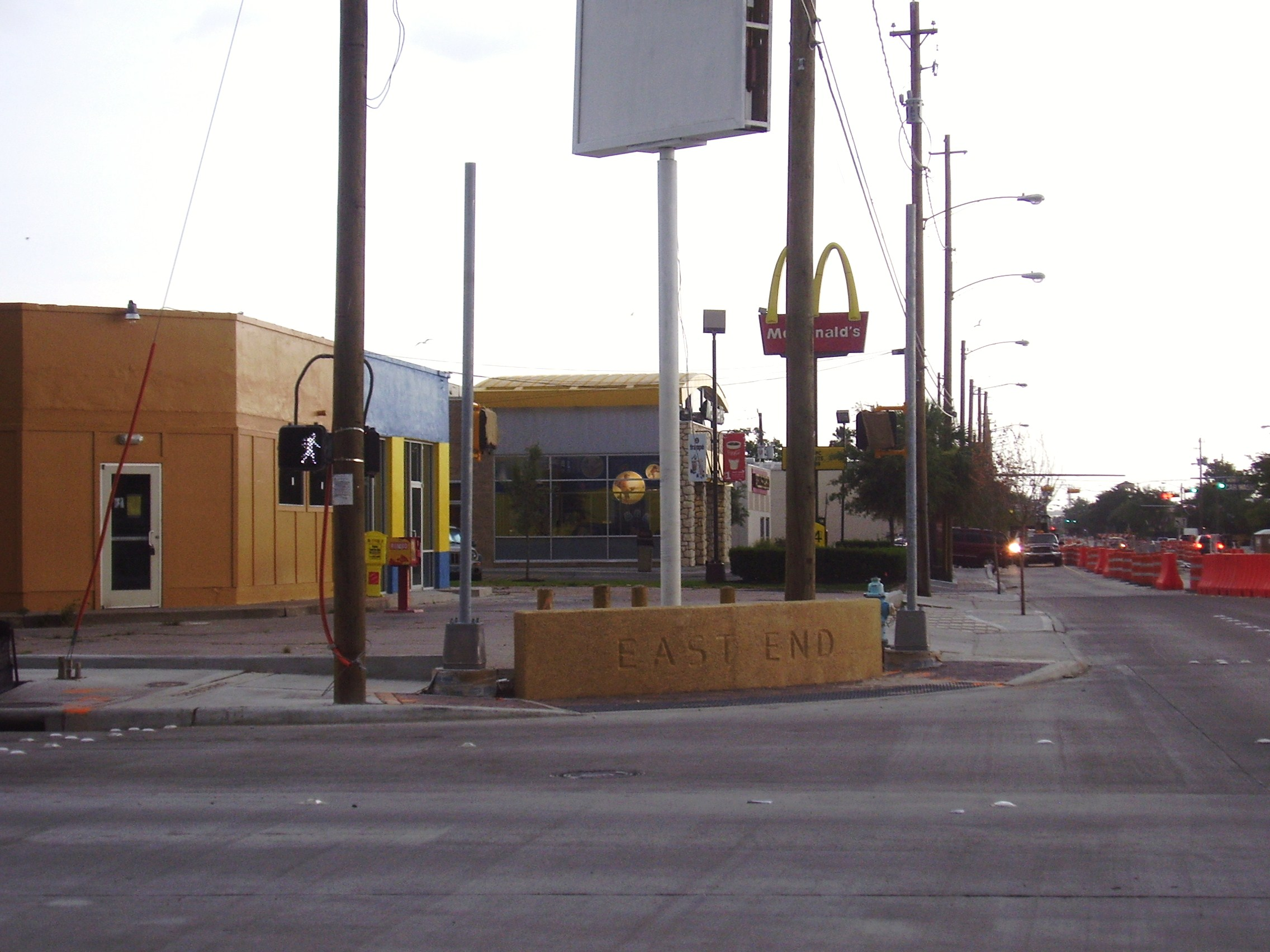
East End

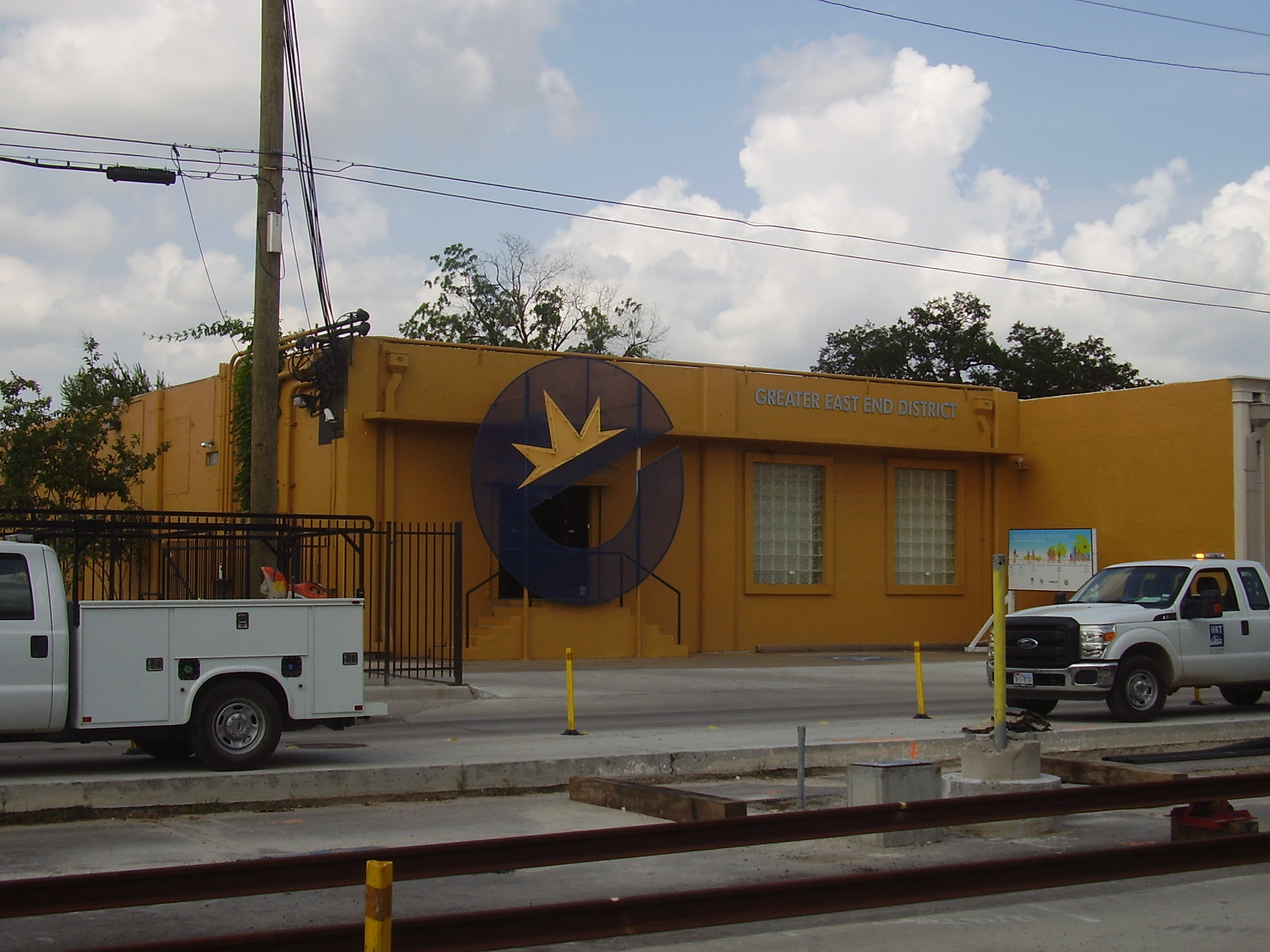
East End District management offices

The East End, managed by the East End District (EED), is a district in eastern Houston, Texas, United States, located between the eastern edge of downtown to the Port of Houston and south to the Gulf Freeway. The District is home to Houston's early history and industry and is the site of Harrisburg, the seat of government for the Republic of Texas in 1836. East End Houston consists of many different ethnic groups, including Hispanic, Asian, White, and African American. Latinos make up more than half of the 100,512 residents, The area includes two of Houston's oldest Hispanic neighborhoods, Magnolia Park and Second Ward.

== History ==
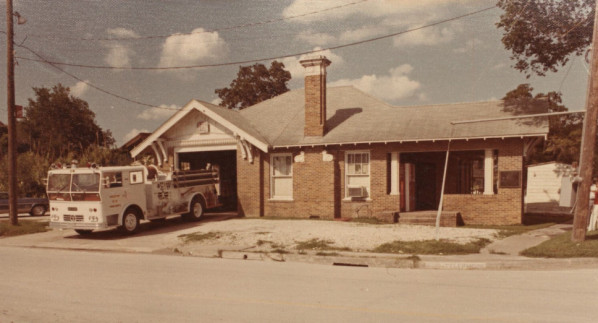
Fire Station 18, 1976

East End Houston is bounded on the west by downtown Houston and on the east by the Port of Houston. Buffalo Bayou flows past the site of Harrisburg, an early Texas trading post and seat of government for the Republic of Texas in 1836. Founded by John Harris, for whom Harris County is named, Harrisburg was initially considered by the Allen brothers for the initial development of Houston.

East End Houston was a primary area for relocation for Germans, Italians and Mexican Americans that settled in areas near the port of Houston. Second Ward and Magnolia Park, in the district, are two of Houston's oldest Hispanic neighborhoods.

The Eastwood subdivision, established in 1913, is considered one of the first master-planned communities in Houston. Many well-known Houstonians including Howard Hughes lived in Eastwood as children.

The District has become popular among those who restore many of its vintage homes. In the mid-to-late 2000s upper middle class residents moved into East End Houston to take advantage of houses that are less expensive than west side houses. Other neighborhoods include: Lawndale/Wayside, EaDo (East Downtown Houston), Broadmoor, Idylwood, Houston Country Club Estates, Forest Hill, Mason Park and Pecan Park. For several months leading into August 2007, the East End Chamber of Commerce Crime Awareness Committee argued that the Houston Police Department assigned insufficient police officers in the area.

In 1997, Lori Rodriguez of the Houston Chronicle said "In the lifetime of some coalition members, the East End has gone from being mainly white to mainly Hispanic, mainly affluent to mainly modest, mainly thriving to mainly struggling," and that "a younger and more aggressive leadership is trying to revitalize the area and, to a touchingly discernible degree, it has succeeded."

The Greater East End management district was established by a bill sponsored by Texas Senator Mario Gallegos and Texas Representative Rick Noriega after a petition circulated advocated for the establishment of the district. The Governor of Texas signed the bill into law in 1999.

The 2002 East End murders involved the deaths of a 15-year-old girl and two waitresses. The perpetrators were arrested and convicted, with two of them receiving death sentences.

== Culture ==
The Talento Bilingue de Houston, the largest cultural arts center of its kind in Houston is in East End Houston, as well as the 100 seat Carlos Garcia Theater at Houston Community College-Southeast campus which was dedicated in late 1997. The district is home to The Orange Show, Our Lady of Guadalupe Church, Mutalistan Hall, and a Chicano mural by artist Leo Tanguma on Canal Street.

The Association for the Advancement of Mexican Americans opened the new $3.6 million AAMA Multi-Purpose Education Center in 1999. The center includes computer and science labs. The Ripley House-Neighborhood Centers successfully completed a capital campaign to raise $9 million to replace its 60-year-old, aging physical structure with a new 60,000-square-foot (5,600 m^{2}) community center.

=== Cuisine ===
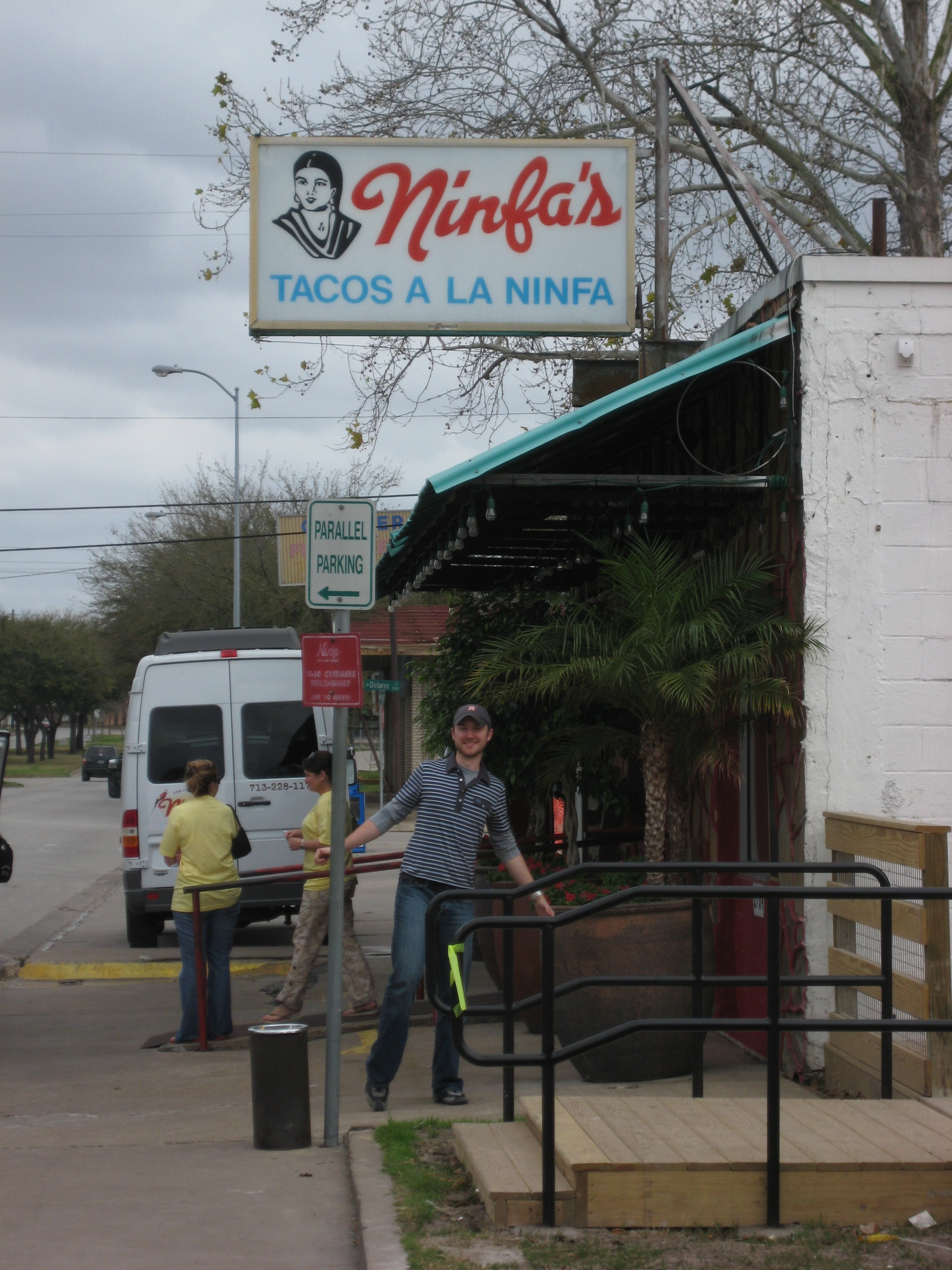
The original Ninfa's

In 1997 Paul Galvani of the Houston Press wrote that despite the fact that the East End has "standouts " like Ninfa's, Mandola's Deli, and Shanghai Reds, "it too frequently gets bypassed when folks think about eating out." That same year the East End Management Association published a dining guide listing 42 restaurants within the East End, including in the Second Ward, the original Chinatown, Magnolia Park, and other communities. The Houston Convention and Visitors Bureau and various area hotels and restaurants distributed the guides for free, and the East End Area Chamber of Commerce mailed copies of the guide. In 2013 Houstonia wrote that East End Houston is "home to some of the city’s best Mexican restaurants and bakeries." The original Ninfa's restaurant opened in East End Houston in 1973. The Ninfa's chain became very popular and prominent.

== Government and infrastructure ==
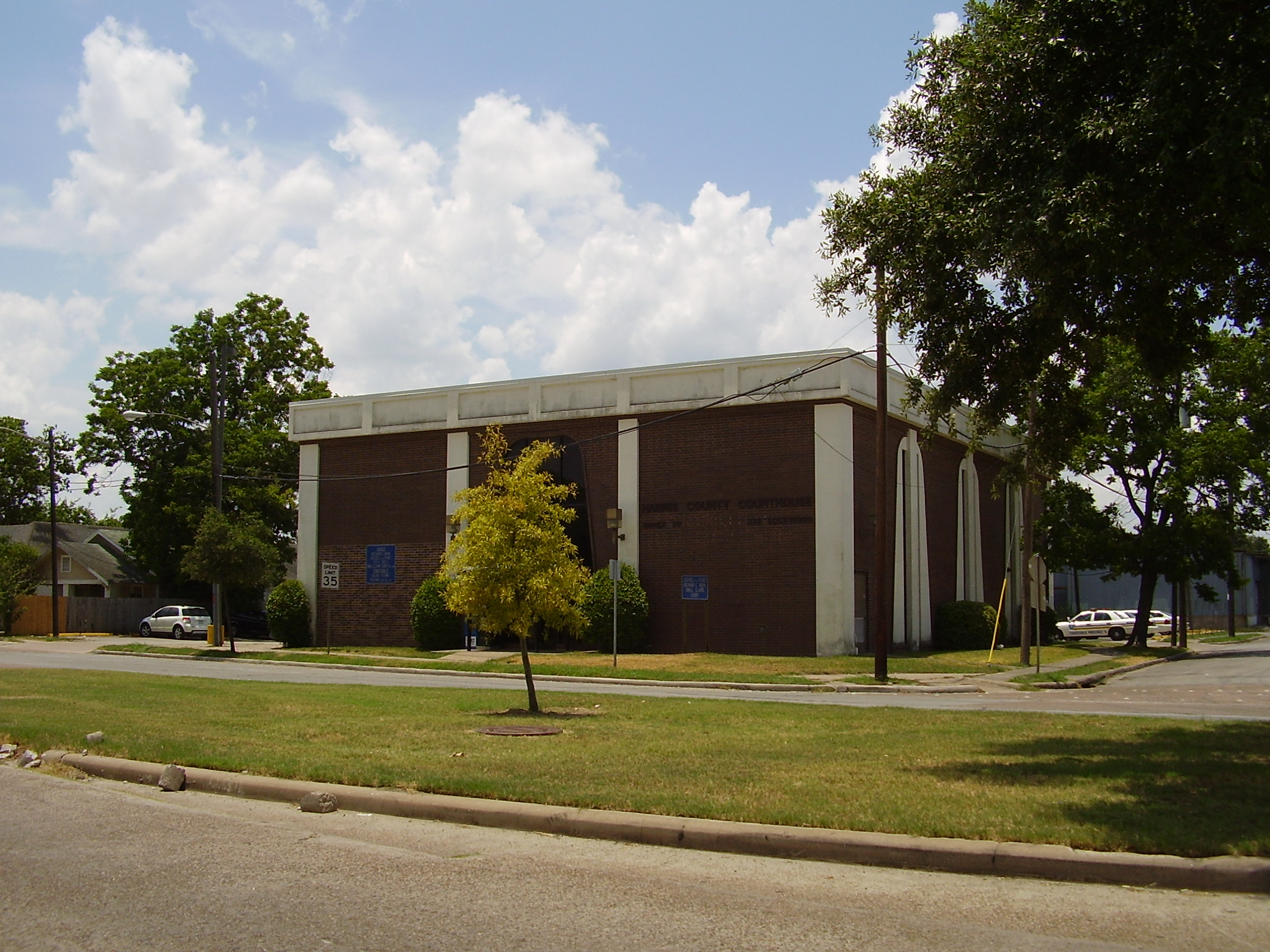
Harris County Courthouse Annex 39

The East End District is headquartered at 3211 Harrisburg Street.

Three Houston City Council districts, B, H, and I, serve sections of the East End.

The Houston Fire Department operates several fire stations in the East End. Three fire stations, Station 18 East End, Station 20 Magnolia Park, and Station 23 Lawndale are in Fire District 20. Station 17 Second Ward is in Fire District 8. In 1920 Station 2 was in what would later become the East End. In 1926 the station moved to what would become Downtown Houston.

Harris County Precinct Two operates the Raul C. Martinez/East End Courthouse annex in the East End. In addition the county operates Courthouse Annex 39 in the East End.

The Houston Housing Authority (HHA), formerly the Housing Authority of the City of Houston (HACH), operates the 296-unit Clayton Homes in the East End. Susan Vahn Clayton donated the property to the HACH in 1952. The development was modernized in 2007.

Harris Health System (formerly Harris County Hospital District) designated the Ripley Health Center in the East End for the ZIP codes 77003, 77011, 77012, and 77023. Martin Luther King Health Center is designated for ZIP code 77087. In 2000 Ripley was replaced by the Gulfgate Health Center. The designated public hospital is Ben Taub General Hospital in the Texas Medical Center.

== Cityscape ==
In 2011 Dane Schiller of the Houston Chronicle said "Parts of the area have the feel of Mexico: brightly painted homes and narrow streets, store signs in Spanish and snow cones sold from carts." In 1997 Lori Rodriguez of the Houston Chronicle said that "the revitalization" that occurred in the 1990s "seems to abruptly stop at the railroad tracks that crisscross Harrisburg beyond the Plaza" and that "the slick national chains must share the commercial corridor with cantinas, empty buildings and halfway houses."

In 2013, 24% of the land in the Greater East End was used for warehouses and industrial purposes.

By 2015 new townhouse developments were appearing in the East End.

=== Communities ===
- Broadmoor
- EaDo (outside of the management district)
- Eastwood
- Old Harrisburg
- Idylwood
- Lawndale/Wayside
- Magnolia Park
- Pecan Park
- Second Ward

== Economy ==
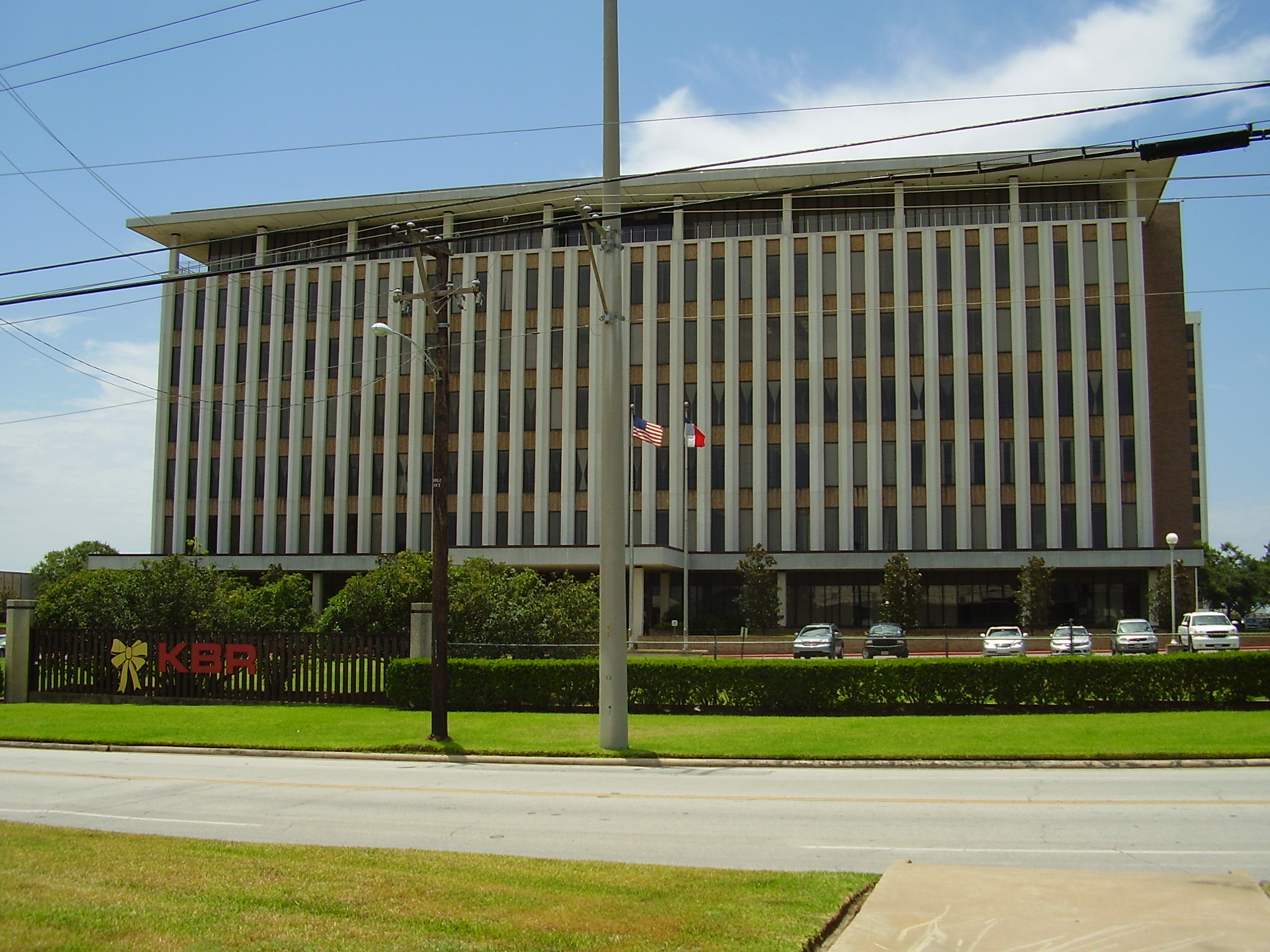
KBR offices on Clinton Drive

By 1997 new retail operations had been established in East End Houston. By the same year, the former Baker Hughes building was renovated into an 80-acre (32 ha) complex, Central City Industrial Park. Five Texas state agencies, together with 1,200 employees, moved into the complex.

KBR maintained offices in a 138 acres (56 ha) campus on Clinton Drive, within the boundaries of East End Houston and the Fifth Ward. The KBR office complex wasthe former headquarters of Brown & Root.

By 2001 Halliburton owned the Clinton Drive campus. In August of that year Halliburton announced that it would consolidate 8,000 local employees to office space in Westchase. Halliburton planned to relocate around 2,000 employees from Clinton Drive and the industrial facilities would have been relocated to a location that was, in that month, undetermined. Sanford Criner, a principal at real estate brokerage Trione & Gordon, suggested that gentrification would turn what would have been the former Clinton Drive facility into entertainment, residential, or retail use, and that the facility would not have been redeveloped for office space usage. In December 2001 Halliburton canceled its plans to relocate employees to Westchase. Nancy Sarnoff of the Houston Business Journal said that it made more sense for the company to lease existing space instead of constructing new office space in times of economic downturns.

In 2010 KBR announced that it would vacate the Clinton Drive campus and move the 1,600 employees who work at there to the KBR offices in Downtown Houston. The company conducted an environmental cleanup of the site. The campus has since been redeveloped as East River, a multi-use complex with residences, offices, and recreational facilities.

When Weingarten's existed, its headquarters was in what is now East End Houston. When Oshman's Sporting Goods existed, its headquarters were in East End Houston. When RioStar Corp. (Ninfa's parent company) existed, its headquarters were also in East End Houston.

== Education ==
=== Primary and secondary schools ===
==== Public schools ====
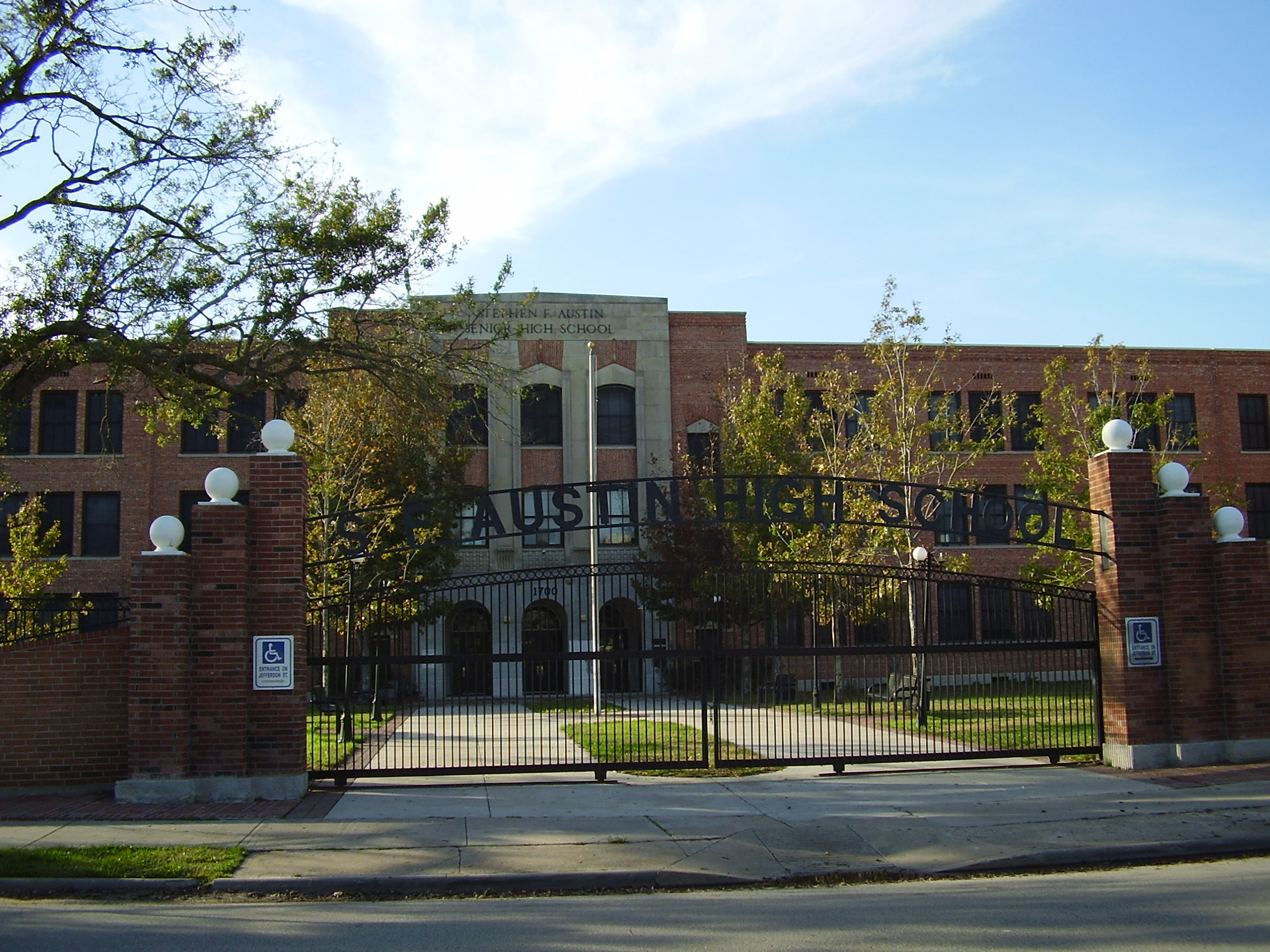
Austin High School

Residents attend school in the Houston Independent School District (HISD).

Sections of areas within the Greater East End Management District are zoned to the following senior high schools:

- Austin High School (in East End Houston)
- Milby High School (in East End Houston)
- Sterling High School (southeast Houston)
  - Prior to mid-2014 the area was zoned to Jones High School in South Park. As part of 2014-2015 rezoning, areas previously zoned to Jones within East End Houston were rezoned to Sterling.
- Wheatley High School (Fifth Ward)

Eastwood Academy in East End Houston is an HISD charter school serving the Austin High School attendance boundary.

HISD schools racially integrated in the 1970s. Prior to integration black students attended Wheatley High School and/or Yates High School. Until 1970 HISD counted its Hispanic and Latino students as "white."

State charter schools include:

- KIPP Intrepid Preparatory School(5–8)
- YES Prep East End, a charter school that, as one branch of YES Prep Public Schools, serves grades 6–12. It opened in 2006. It was in the Near North Side area, northwest of the East End Houston area. It is now within East End Houston.
- George I. Sanchez Charter School

==== Private schools ====
Roman Catholic Archdiocese of Galveston-Houston operates a single K-8 school in the East End: Our Lady of Guadalupe School in the Second Ward.

Resurrection School is in nearby Denver Harbor.

The archdiocese previously also operated Queen of Peace School, which opened on September 8, 1947, in a four classroom building. The official website of the school stated that the school being shuttered was a possibility in the 1980s as the number of students fell significantly. That institution closed in 2020, partially due to the COVID-19 pandemic.

=== Colleges and universities ===
The Houston Community College System serves East End Houston. HCCS Southeast College is in East End Houston.

=== Public libraries ===
Three Houston Public Library locations are in East End Houston. They include the Patricio Flores Neighborhood Library, the Melcher Neighborhood Library, and the Stanaker Neighborhood Library.

== Transportation ==
The Metropolitan Transit Authority of Harris County (METRO) operates public transportation services, including buses and the METRORail tram service. METRORail stations include:

On the METRORail Green Line:

- Coffee Plant/Second Ward
- Lockwood/Eastwood
- Altic/Howard Hughes
- Magnolia Park Transit Center

In addition as of 1997 several companies offered international bus services to Mexico from East End Houston. As of that year most of the passengers were Hispanics who were visiting family members. The international bus services from East End Houston were established in the 1990s. Greyhound Bus Lines and Autobuses Americanos maintain services at a bus station next to the Magnolia Park Transit Center. On December 1, 2023, Greyhound moved its remaining services from Midtown to the Magnolia Park bus stop. This station has four bays for buses, less than the previous station.

== Culture and recreation ==
The YMCA Cossaboom Branch opened in the 1950s. Circa 2018 the YMCA closed it stating that there were flooding concerns, and it sold the property to Jerome Karam, a lawyer from Friendswood, who planned to develop the property into a private gymnasium. The Cossaboom YMCA had 102 dormitory rooms, only allowing single male residents.

== Notable residents ==
- Carol Alvarado, Texas State Representative and Houston City Council member.
- Ninfa Laurenzo, restaurateur and founder of Ninfa's (Second Ward)
