= Telephone Road =

Street in Houston, Texas, USA

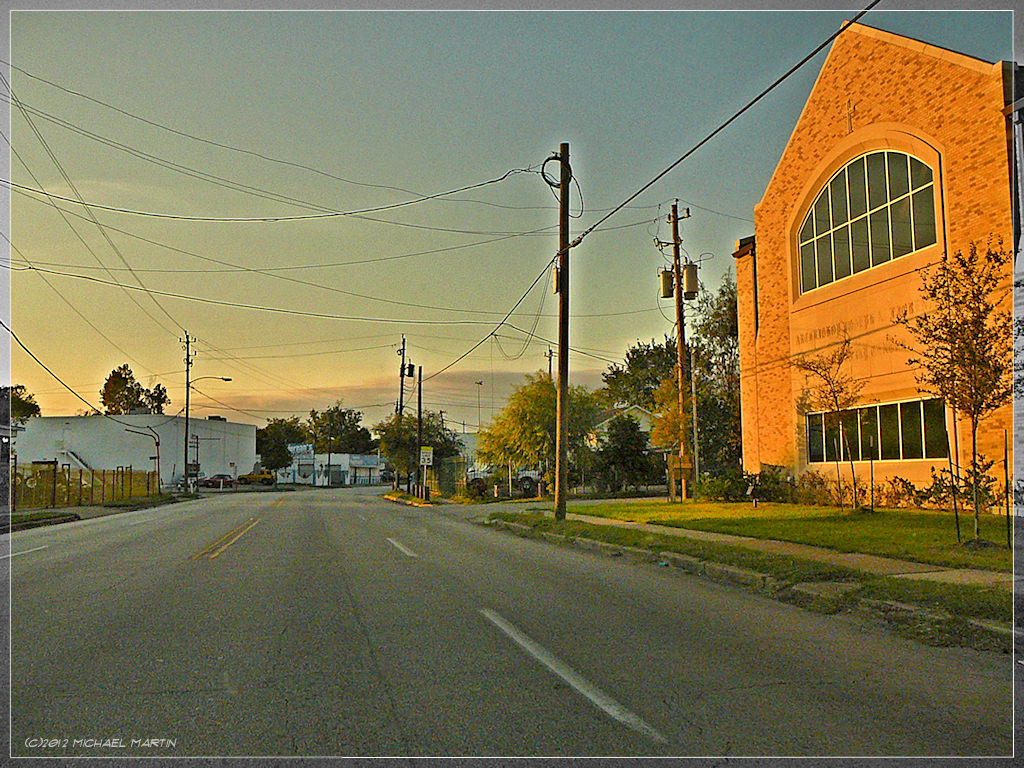
Telephone Road near I-45

Telephone Road is a street in eastern and southeastern Houston, Texas, United States. The road extends from East McKinney Street to the City of Pearland. A portion of Telephone Road is also designated as Texas State Highway 35.

== History ==
Telephone Road was and is a dynamic thoroughfare meandering from the east side of Houston through working-class developments and suburbs, out to the area that was the countryside (until broad development of Pearland and north Brazoria County). Just north of Hobby Airport, it borders Garden Villas subdivision. Historically, Telephone Road is named after the telephone lines that ran along the road in the early 1900s. The Long family of Pearland first started the phone company or was involved with laying the lines. Long Drive intersects with Telephone Road and may be named for the Long family.

The thoroughfare was home to the A&P Store, the Golfcrest Hardware Store, the Tropicana Swimming Club, the Santa Rosa Theater, the Four Palms Bar, City Office Supply, Frank's Grill and still the Tel-Wink Grill. Jimmy Menutis' club hosted music acts like Louis Armstrong, Chuck Berry, Fats Domino, Jerry Lee Lewis & Brenda Lee. Bill Quinn's original Gold Star Studios produced hit songs by artists including the Big Bopper, George Jones and Freddy Fender. The Four Palms was a neighborhood bar on Telephone Road just south of Holmes Road, which is now the South Loop 610. It was locally notorious in the 50s, 60s and 70s for being what was then called a "pressure cooker club" which was rumored to be a spot where married women would meet their boyfriends then dash home to pressure cook dinner for their husbands. It runs alongside Hobby Airport starting at Airport Boulevard.

During the construction of NASA's Johnson Space Center in the 1960s, an office complex on Wheeler Street (one block West of 3700 Telephone Rd, westside) served as the primary office to architects, scientists and engineers while a "dormitory" nearby on Beatty Street housed the professionals throughout completion of the NASA complex. The dormitory became The Franklin Apartments. On the corner of Telephone Road and Beatty Street was Flanigan Industries, the first mobile home - RV parts supplier in Houston where a full-size camper trailer was mounted 25 feet above Telephone Road.

Burton Chapman wrote a book called Telephone Road, Texas. In a 2008 blog post J. R. Gonzalez, a journalist for the Houston Chronicle, said that he could not "think of any other Houston thoroughfare that has garnered a more negative reputation in the last 40 years or so" than Telephone Road. Dave Straughan, a former sergeant of the robbery division of the Houston Police Department said "Telephone Road had a national reputation for being pretty wild. It had good neighborhoods and good people, but it had pockets of people that were known for living on the wild side."

Steve Earle and Houston native Rodney Crowell have named songs after Houston's "Telephone Road."
