= List of places named after Cesar Chavez =

Cesar Chavez named places

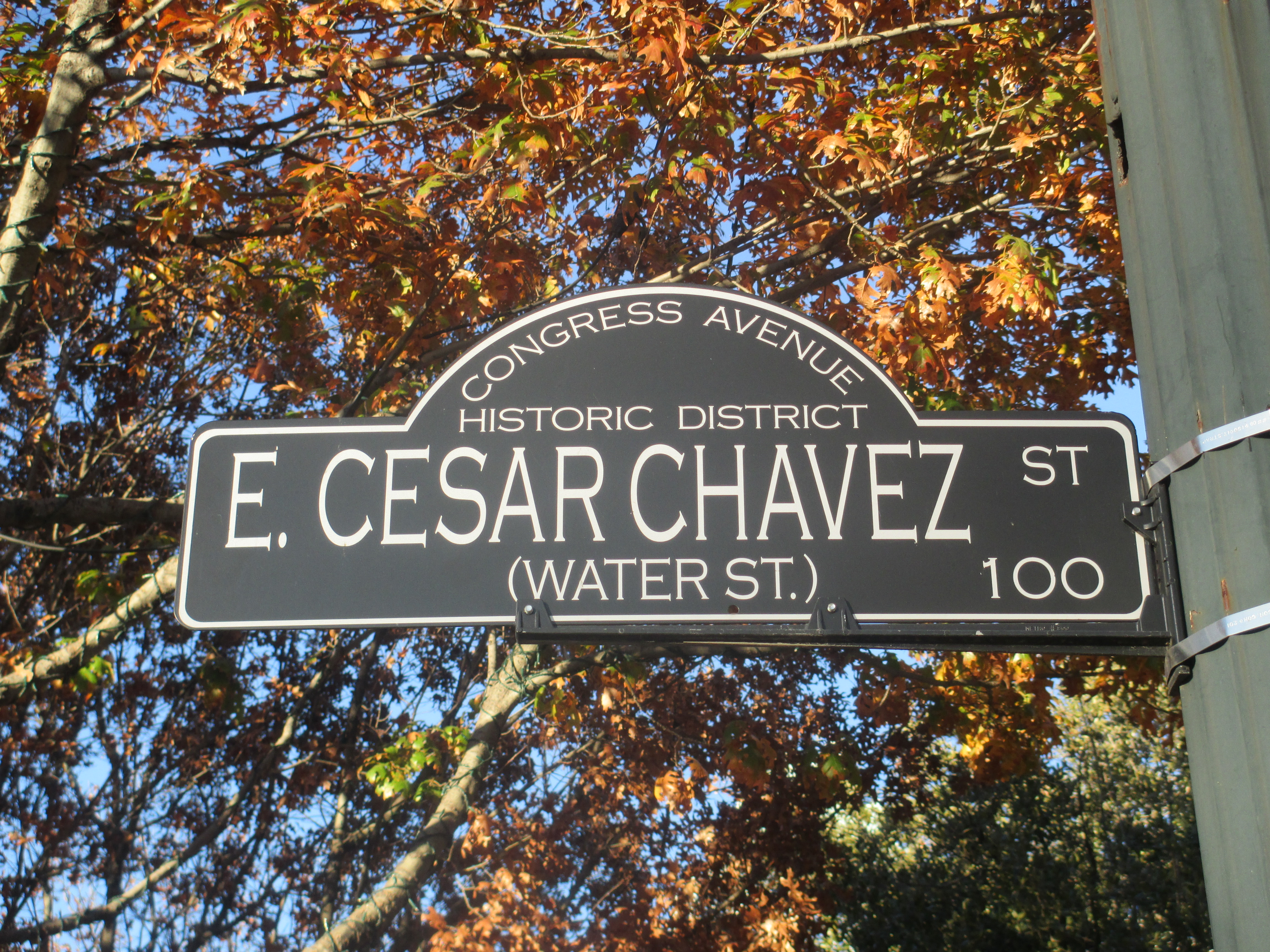
Cesar Chavez Street sign in Austin, Texas

The following is a list of places named after Cesar Chavez, an American labor leader and civil rights activist. The list includes current places, former places, and places for which governments or institutions have begun public renaming processes. Beginning in March 2026, following public sexual abuse allegations against Chávez, various local and state governments and other organizations either renamed or made plans to rename locations and institutions commemorating him.

== Communities ==
=== Texas ===
Cesar Chavez, Texas

- César Chávez (unincorporated area in Hidalgo County)

== Parks and public facilities ==
=== Arizona ===
- Cesar Chavez Cultural Center (San Luis)

=== California ===
- César Chávez Community Center (Riverside) (2060 University Ave, also known as the César Chávez Auditorium)
- Southeastern Post Office (Barrio Logan, San Diego) Redesignated in 2009.
- 25th & Commercial station (San Diego) (Orange Line SDMTS Trolley Station, trains bound for Courthouse (Downtown) & Arnele Ave. (El Cajon) stations)
- Cesar E. Chavez National Monument (Keene)
- César E. Chávez Park (Colton)
- César E. Chávez Park (Oakland)

== Major streets ==
=== Arizona ===
- Cesar Chavez Blvd (San Luis) (formerly G Street)
- César Chávez Street (San Luis) (formerly Third Avenue)
- Cesar Chavez Avenue (Somerton) (formerly Avenue F)

=== California ===
- Cesar Chavez Street (formerly Army Street, San Francisco)
- Paseo de César Chávez (San Jose)

=== Michigan ===
- Chávez Drive (Flint) (Interstate 475 Service Drive through downtown)
- César E. Chávez Avenue (Grand Rapids) (formerly Grandville Avenue, renamed in 2022)

=== Oregon ===
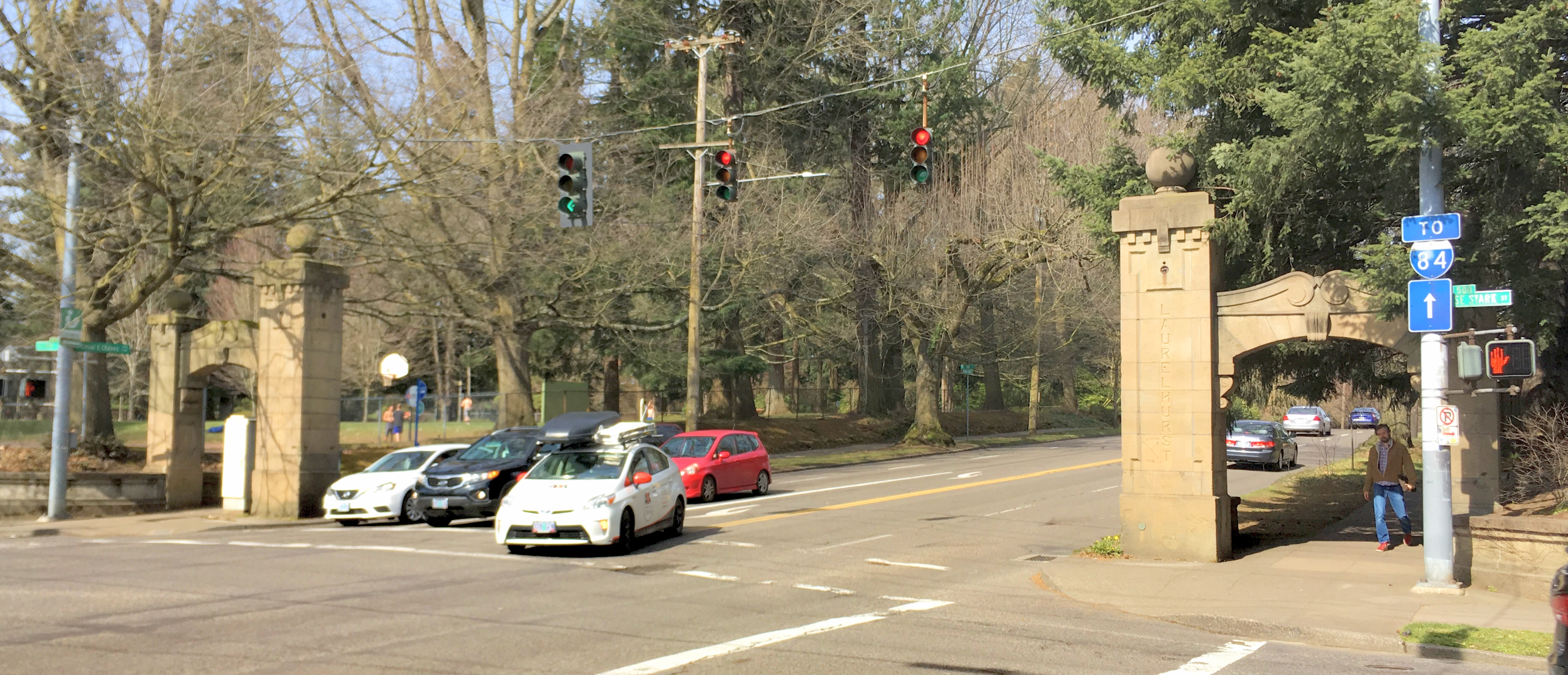
Laurelhurst gates at Chavez and Stark - Portland Oregon

- César Chávez Boulevard (Portland) (formerly NE/SE 39th Avenue)

=== Texas ===
- Cesar Chavez Memorial Highway (Corpus Christi) (Texas State Highway 44)
- César Chávez Border Highway (El Paso) (Texas State Highway Loop 375; formerly Border Highway)
- César E. Chávez Drive (Lubbock) (formerly Canyon Lakes Drive)
- César Chávez Road (San Juan)

=== Utah ===
- 2320 South in West Valley City bears the honorary designation Cesar Chavez Drive

== Libraries ==
=== California ===
- Maywood César Chávez Library (Maywood)
- Cesár Chávez Public Library (Salinas)
- Cesar Chavez Library (San Jose)

== K-12 schools ==
=== Arizona ===
- César Chávez Elementary School (San Luis)

=== California ===
- Cesar Chavez Continuation High School (Compton)
- Cesar Chavez Elementary School (Calexico)
- Cesar Chavez Elementary School (Corona)
- Cesar Chavez Middle School (Oceanside)
- Cesar E. Chavez Elementary School (Bell Gardens)
- Cesar E. Chavez Elementary School (Madera)
- Cesar E. Chavez Middle School (Ceres, California)
- César Chávez Elementary School (Coachella)
- César Chávez Elementary School (Greenfield)
- César Chávez Elementary School (San Jose)
- César Chávez Middle School (Hayward)
- César E. Chávez Elementary School (Norwalk)
- César E. Chávez Intermediate School (Sacramento)
- César Estrada Chávez Dual Language Immersion School (Santa Barbara)
- Cesar Chavez High School (Stockton)
- César E. Chávez School for Social Change (Santa Cruz)

=== Michigan ===
- Cesar Chavez Academy (Detroit)
- César E. Chávez Elementary School (Grand Rapids)

=== New Mexico ===
- César Chavez Charter High School (Deming)
- Cesar Chavez Community School (Albuquerque)

=== Ohio ===
- César Chavez College Preparatory School (Columbus)

=== Oregon ===
- César E. Chávez Elementary School (Eugene)
- César Chávez School (Portland)

=== Texas ===
- César Chávez Academy (Corpus Christi)
- César Chávez Middle School (La Joya)
- César Chávez Middle School (Waco)
- César Chávez Learning Center (Dallas)
- César Chávez Elementary School (Pharr)
- César Chávez Academy (El Paso)

== Post-secondary schools ==
=== California ===
- César Chávez Campus of the Fresno Adult School (Fresno)
- César Chávez Administration Building, Los Angeles City College (East Hollywood)

== Former places and places pending renaming ==
=== Community centers ===
California

- César Chávez Community Center / San Ysidro Larsen Field Community Center (San Diego). In April 2026, San Diego officials were in the process of updating the official name of the center, which had previously been called the César Chávez Community Center, after the mayor directed city departments to remove Chávez references from city programs, facilities, and public assets.

Wisconsin

- César Chávez Community Center (Racine, Wisconsin). Originally renamed from Douglas Community Center and dedicated March 26, 2000. Chavez visited Racine twice, participating in a local strike in 1991. Mayor Cory Mason proposed renaming the center to the Dolores Huerta Community Center; a resolution was scheduled for the April 20, 2026, Common Council meeting. Common Council voted on November 17, 2026 to rename the center the Maria Luisa Morales Community Center.

=== Parks ===
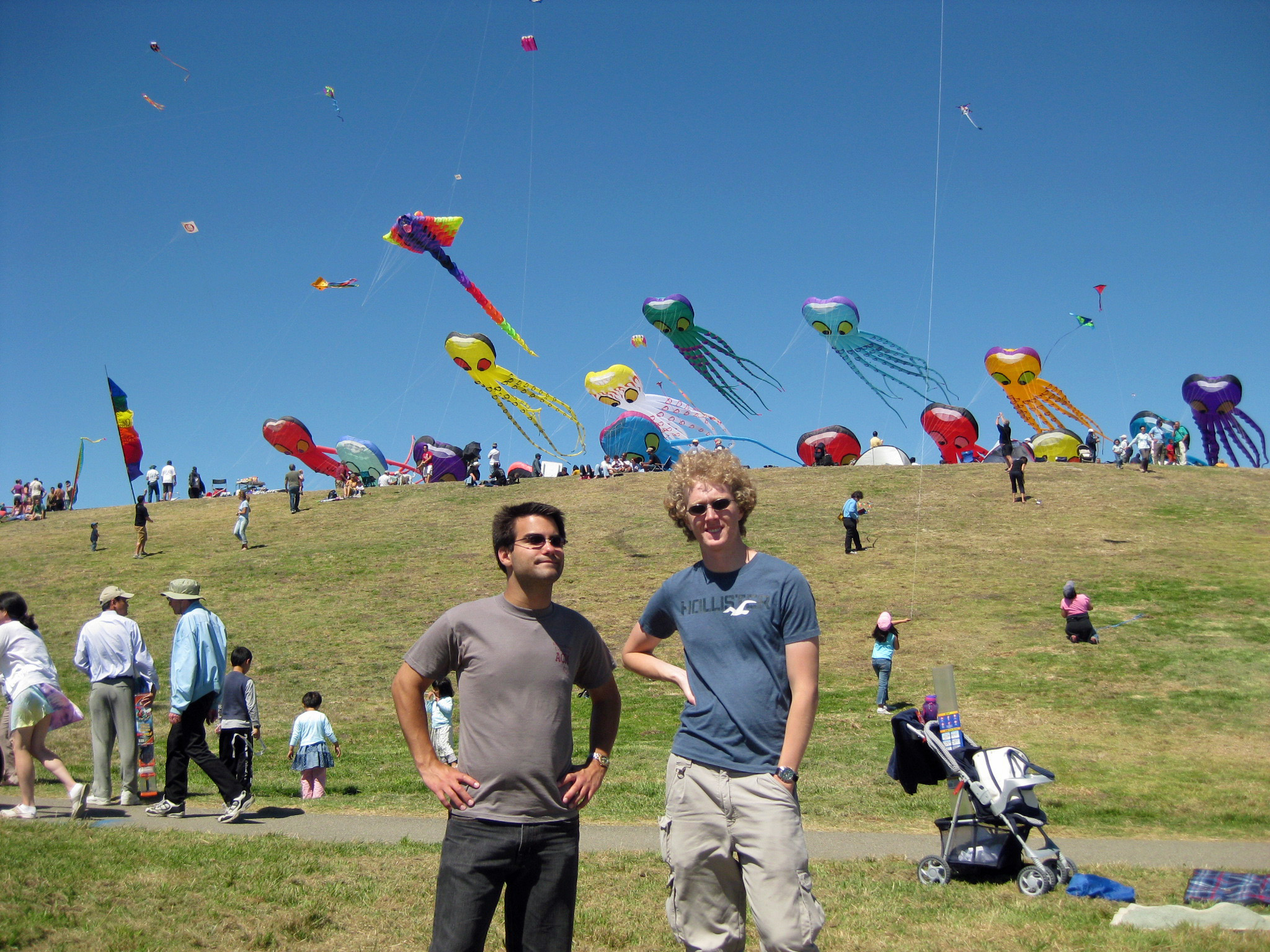
César Chávez Park in Berkeley, California

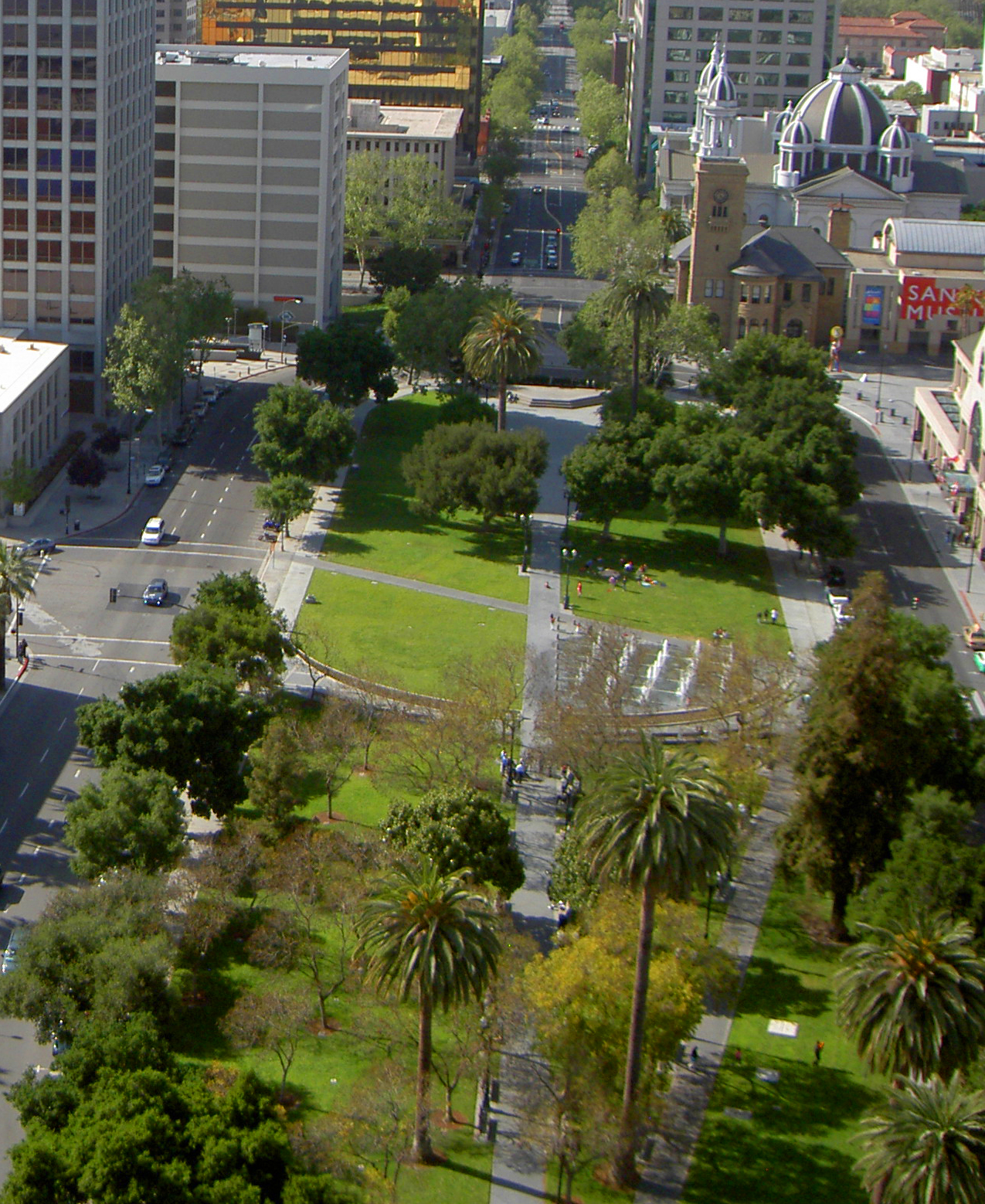
Plaza de César Chávez, San Jose

Arizona

- César Chávez Square (Phoenix). Phoenix City Council voted on March 25, 2026, to begin removing Chávez's name and likeness from city street signs, facilities, public art, and other city-owned assets; city staff covered the plaza signage immediately and began the formal renaming process for affected facilities.
- César Chávez Park (Laveen). Phoenix City Council voted on March 25, 2026, to begin removing Chávez's name from city facilities; the city referred the park's renaming to the Parks and Recreation Board process.

California

- César E. Chávez Waterfront Park (San Diego). Changed to Port Park on March 20, 2026.
- Cesar Chavez Campesino Park (Santa Ana). City council voted unanimously in April 2026 to rename the park back to Campesino Park, its original pre-2001 name.
- Plaza de César Chávez (San Jose). San Jose leaders began a public process in March 2026 to remove Chávez's name from city parks and sites, including Plaza de César Chávez; city crews had already covered a plaque bearing his name at the plaza.
- Cesar E. Chavez Plaza (Sacramento). Sacramento officials began the process of renaming the downtown plaza in March 2026, and city leaders solicited replacement-name ideas in April 2026.
- César E. Chávez Park (Delano). Delano City Council voted unanimously in April 2026 to remove Chávez's name from city-owned properties; the approved recommendations included changing César Chávez Park back to Ellington Park.
- César Chávez Park (Berkeley). Berkeley City Council voted in March 2026 to begin renaming the park and directed removal of signage bearing Chávez's name; the city process included referral to the Parks, Recreation and Waterfront Commission.
- César E. Chávez Park (Modesto). Modesto's Culture Commission initiated the process to rename the park in April 2026 and solicited new-name suggestions from the public.
- Cesar E. Chavez Park (Long Beach). Long Beach City Council voted unanimously in March 2026 to begin renaming city parks, streets, and facilities named after Chávez, including the downtown park.

Colorado

- Cesar E. Chavez Park (Denver). Name, signage, and memorial bust removed on March 19, 2026.

Nevada

- César E. Chávez Park (Las Vegas). Clark County officials began the process of removing Chávez's name from the park in April 2026.

Washington

- Cesar Chavez Park (Seattle). Signage and website removed March 24, 2026, new name pending.

=== Libraries ===
Arizona

- César E. Chávez Regional Branch (Phoenix). Phoenix City Council voted on March 25, 2026, to begin removing Chávez's name from city facilities. Phoenix Public Library later launched a community survey to rename the Laveen library, temporarily referring to it as the Library in Laveen. On June 22 the library was renamed Prickly Pear Library.

California

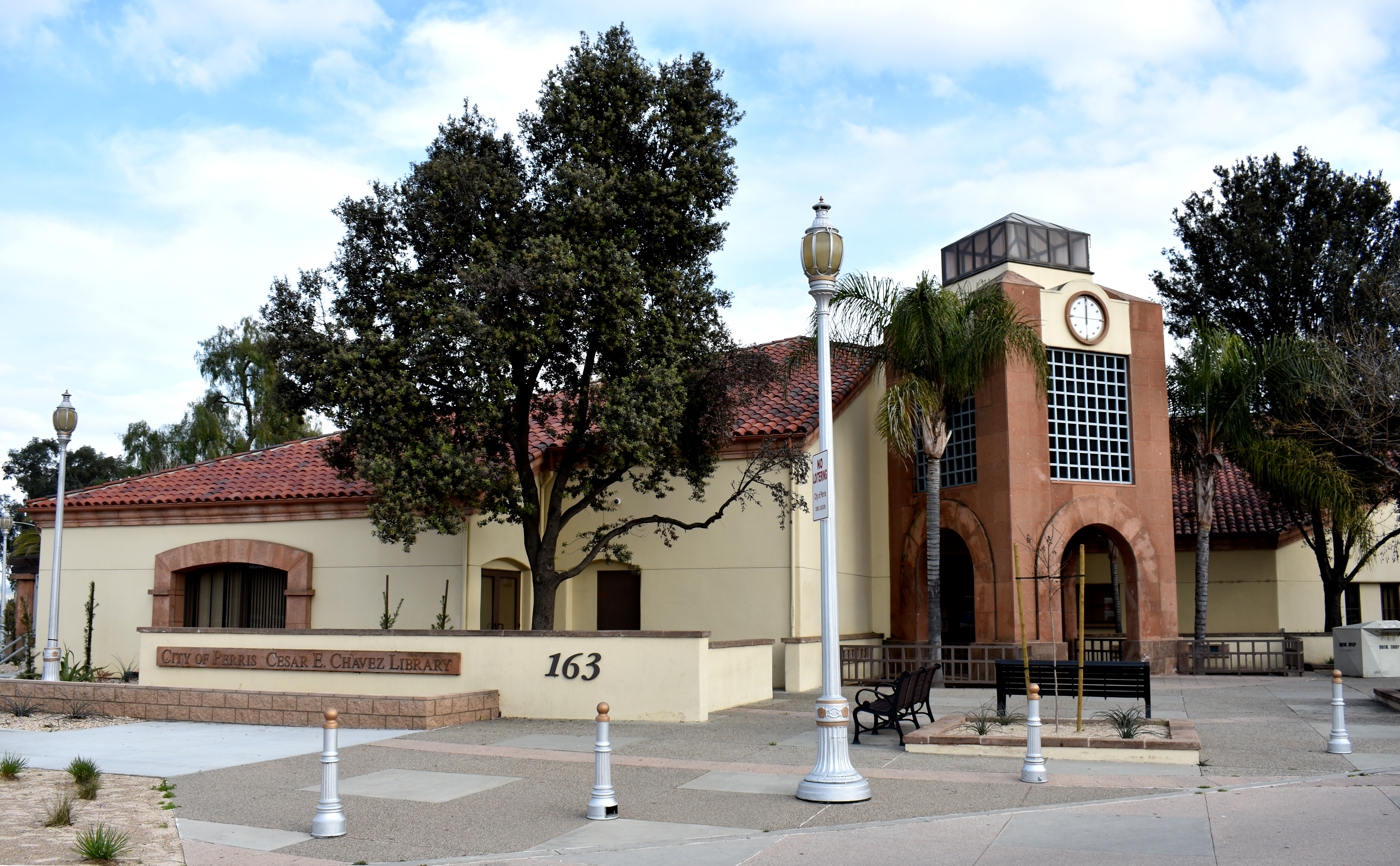
Former Cesar Chavez Library in Perris

- César E. Chávez Branch Library (Oakland) (formerly the Latin American Library Branch). Oakland Public Library director Jamie Turbak said in April 2026 that the Library Commission would consider a recommendation to rename the Fruitvale branch the "Fruitvale Branch", and scheduled the proposal for the commission's April 27, 2026, meeting; any rename would then go to the City Council via the Rules and Life Enrichment committees.
- Cesar Chavez Library (Perris). Perris City Council voted in April 2026 to rename the library to the City of Perris Public Library.
- César Chávez Central Library (Stockton). Stockton City Council voted in April 2026 to keep the library's name unchanged for the time being, but to cover the Chávez name on the downtown library and form a committee to explore next steps.

=== Major streets ===
California

- Avenida Cesar Chavez (Los Angeles) (formerly Brooklyn Avenue, Macy Street and part of Sunset Boulevard). Los Angeles County Supervisor Hilda Solis announced in March 2026 that she would introduce a motion directing an exploration of renaming county parks, streets, facilities, real property, monuments, and other county programs bearing Chávez's name, while Los Angeles City Councilmember Ysabel Jurado called for the renaming of all public locations and events that bear his name. Advocacy groups including California Rising proposed renaming the avenue Dolores Huerta Avenue, while Boyle Heights community organizations renewed earlier calls to restore the Brooklyn Avenue name.
- Cesar Chavez Street (San Francisco) (formerly Army Street). A city supervisor began working with community and labor groups on a renaming process.
- César E. Chávez Parkway (San Diego) (formerly Crosby Street). Mayor Todd Gloria signed an executive order on March 20, 2026, directing city departments to begin removing public references to Chávez; on April 21, 2026, the San Diego City Council renamed the street Chicano Park Boulevard.
- Cesar Chavez Boulevard (Fresno) (formerly portions of East Kings Canyon Road, East Ventura Avenue, and West California Avenue; renamed in 2023). Fresno City Council voted unanimously on March 20, 2026, to initiate the process of restoring the original street names, and on April 23, 2026, approved returning the street to California Avenue, Ventura Street, and Kings Canyon Road.
- Calle César Chávez (Santa Barbara) (formerly South Salsipuedes Street). Santa Barbara City Council formally started the process of renaming the street in April 2026, with officials considering a return to the Salsipuedes name.
- César Chávez Drive (Oxnard). Oxnard City Council considered a staff report and survey process for renaming the street on April 7, 2026.
- César Chávez Street (Brawley) (formerly North 10th Street). Brawley City Council directed staff on April 21, 2026, to initiate the formal process to rename Cesar Chavez Street.

Idaho

- César Chávez Lane (Boise, Idaho). Boise State University announced in May 2026 that it would rename the campus thoroughfare and forwarded three possible replacement names—Friendship Lane, Campus Lane, and Peregrine Lane—for city and county review.

Michigan

- César E. Chávez Avenue (Lansing) (East Grand River Avenue, beginning at Oakland Avenue to Washington Avenue and West Grand River Avenue). Lansing City Council considered a resolution in March 2026 to rename the portion of Grand River Avenue that had been named for Chávez in 2017; a committee tabled the resolution for 90 days to study responses in other communities.
- César E. Chávez Avenue (Pontiac) (Business U.S. Highway 24). Pontiac officials began reviewing a possible name change in March 2026 after the sexual abuse allegations.

Minnesota

- Cesar Chavez Avenue (Minneapolis) (formerly North Fourth Avenue). A Minneapolis City Council member began working in March 2026 to rename the avenue following the sexual abuse allegations.
- César Chávez Street (Saint Paul) (formerly Concord Street). St. Paul Mayor Kaohly Vang Her announced a drive to rename the street in April 2026, with a community feedback process led by the West Side Community Organization.

Missouri

- Avenida César Chávez (Kansas City) (formerly 23rd Street). City and neighborhood leaders began considering a name change in March 2026; Kansas City's street-renaming process requires an impact report, mailed notices, public hearings, and a final City Council vote.

New Mexico

- Avenida César Chávez (Albuquerque) (formerly Stadium Boulevard). Albuquerque Mayor Tim Keller and City Council President Klarissa Peña announced in March 2026 that the city had begun a formal process to rename city-owned places bearing Chávez's name, including the avenue; the city held public input meetings at the National Hispanic Cultural Center on March 31 and April 14, 2026, and continued accepting suggestions for a replacement name.

Texas

- Cesar Chavez Street (Austin) (formerly First Street). Several Austin City Council members requested in April 2026 that the city manager develop a community outreach plan to gather input on renaming the street, including listening sessions, surveys, and cost assessments.
- César Chávez Boulevard (Dallas) (formerly South Central Expressway). Six Dallas City Council members issued a memo on March 18, 2026, requesting that the city remove Chávez's name from its calendar and initiate a broader discussion to rename César Chávez Boulevard; the council also designated April 10 as Dolores Huerta Day.
- César Chávez Boulevard (Houston) (formerly 67th Street). Mayor John Whitmire launched a formal renaming process on April 1, 2026, with a public comment period and a City Council vote originally scheduled for May 13, 2026. The vote was delayed in May 2026, and community discussions continued after Dolores Huerta declined use of her name as a replacement.
  - Cesar Chavez/67th Street station
- César Chávez Boulevard (San Antonio) (formerly Durango Boulevard). On April 14, 2026, San Antonio City Council member Teri Castillo filed a Council Consideration Request that initiated the process of restoring the Durango Boulevard name after a city survey found majority support for the change. The City Council unanimously voted to revert the street's name to Durango Boulevard on August 20, 2026.
- Cesar Chavez Walkway (Laredo). Laredo City Council voted in April 2026 to rename the walkway the Laredo Farm Workers Walkway.

Utah

- 500 South in Salt Lake City, formerly bearing the honorary designation Cesar E. Chavez Boulevard. Salt Lake City removed the commemorative street signs in April 2026 and began a public process for a replacement honorary name. On May 5, 2026, the City Council approved the honorary designation Dolores Huerta Boulevard for the portion of 500 South between State Street and 700 East.
- 30th Street in Ogden, formerly bearing the honorary designation Cesar E. Chavez Street. Ogden City Council members unanimously supported removing commemorative Chávez street signage in March 2026 while considering whether to rescind the honorary designation.

Wisconsin

- César E. Chávez Drive (Milwaukee) (formerly South 16th Street). Milwaukee Common Council voted on April 21, 2026, to rename the street back to South 16th Street; city crews began replacing signs on April 24, 2026.

=== K-12 schools ===
Arizona

- César Chávez Community School (Phoenix, Arizona). Name changed to Rio Vista Community School on July 7, 2026.
- César Chávez High School (Laveen, Arizona). Name removed; temporarily renamed Champions Circle High School on March 27, 2026. In May 2026, Phoenix Union High School District approved Cactus Canyon High School as the permanent name, effective for the 2026–2027 school year.

California

- César Chávez Middle School (San Bernardino). Name removed and temporarily designated Middle School 318 on March 20, 2026.
- César Chávez Learning Academies (San Fernando). LAUSD board voted unanimously on March 24, 2026, to commence an expedited renaming process. Renamed Arroyo High School in July 2026.
- Chávez High School (Santa Ana). Santa Ana Unified School District board took first steps in March 2026 to rename the school, covering signs and logos bearing Chávez's name and directing staff to form a committee to review school names. Name change to Dolores Huerta High School approved on May 19, 2026.
- César Chávez Elementary School (San Diego). San Diego Unified School District began the process of renaming the school following an executive order by Mayor Todd Gloria.
- Cesar E. Chavez High School (Delano). Delano Joint Union High School District board voted 3–2 on March 24, 2026, to change the school's name and form a committee to select from a list of replacement names.
- César Chávez Elementary School (Davis). Davis Joint Unified School District board agreed on April 2, 2026, to form a committee to rename the school; on April 16 it appointed a 15-member ad hoc renaming committee, with a final board decision expected June 4, 2026.
- César Chávez Elementary School (Los Angeles). LAUSD board voted unanimously on March 24, 2026, to rename the El Sereno elementary school and the César Chávez Learning Academies in San Fernando by fall 2026, and to remove Chávez-related murals and commemorations.
- César Chávez Elementary School (Oxnard) (formerly Juanita Elementary School). Oxnard School District began the school name-change process in March 2026 and scheduled board discussion of the renaming process in April 2026.
- Cesar E. Chavez Academy / César Chávez Ravenswood School (East Palo Alto). Ravenswood City School District said in March 2026 that it planned to change the name of the César Chávez Ravenswood campus in East Palo Alto.
- Cesar Chavez Elementary School (Long Beach). Long Beach Unified School District began the process to rename the school and removed Chávez-related murals in April 2026.
- César Chávez Elementary School (Salinas). The Alisal Union School Board voted unanimously in April 2026 to form a citizens advisory committee to evaluate a possible name change for the East Salinas school.
- César Chávez Elementary School (San Francisco). San Francisco officials began considering how to rename the Mission District elementary school and Cesar Chavez Street, with Supervisor Jackie Fielder's office working with community and labor groups on a renaming process.
- Cesar E. Chavez Middle School (Planada). Planada Elementary School District's Board of Trustees made a unanimous decision in 2026 to proceed with renaming the school after a public survey; the district said it would establish an advisory committee and later vote on a final replacement name.
- Cesar Chavez Middle School (Union City). New Haven Unified School District's Board of Education authorized staff in April 2026 to begin a renaming process, with community feedback and a board recommendation expected in June 2026.
- César E. Chavez Middle School (Watsonville). Pajaro Valley Unified School District moved forward in April 2026 with a process to rename the school; district officials estimated the renaming would cost more than $100,000 and require a committee to recommend new names.

Colorado

- Chávez Huerta Preparatory Academy (Pueblo, Colorado) (closed 2025)

Illinois

- César E. Chávez Multicultural Academic Center (Chicago). The Chicago public elementary school initiated a process in April 2026 to change its name; any recommendation would require Local School Council and Chicago Board of Education approval.

Maryland

- César Chavez Dual Spanish Immersion School (Hyattsville). Prince George's County Public Schools said in March 2026 that it was evaluating next steps for the naming of the school, with any renaming process to include a committee, naming commission review, superintendent recommendation, and school board decision.

Minnesota

- Academia Cesar Chavez Charter School (St. Paul). Name changed to Academia In Lak'ech Charter School on May 13, 2026.

New Mexico

- César Chávez Elementary School (Santa Fe). Santa Fe school board voted unanimously on March 26, 2026, to remove Chávez's name and identify images of Chávez for removal; temporarily was renamed to White Tigers Elementary School; will be permanently renamed to Cielo Azul Elementary School.
- César E. Chávez Elementary School (Las Cruces). Las Cruces Public Schools Board of Education voted unanimously on April 21, 2026, to remove Chávez's name; the renaming process began immediately; name changed to Desert Bloom Elementary School on July 1, 2026.

Oklahoma

- César Chávez Elementary School (Oklahoma City). Oklahoma City Public Schools board voted on April 13, 2026, to initiate the process of renaming the school.

Texas

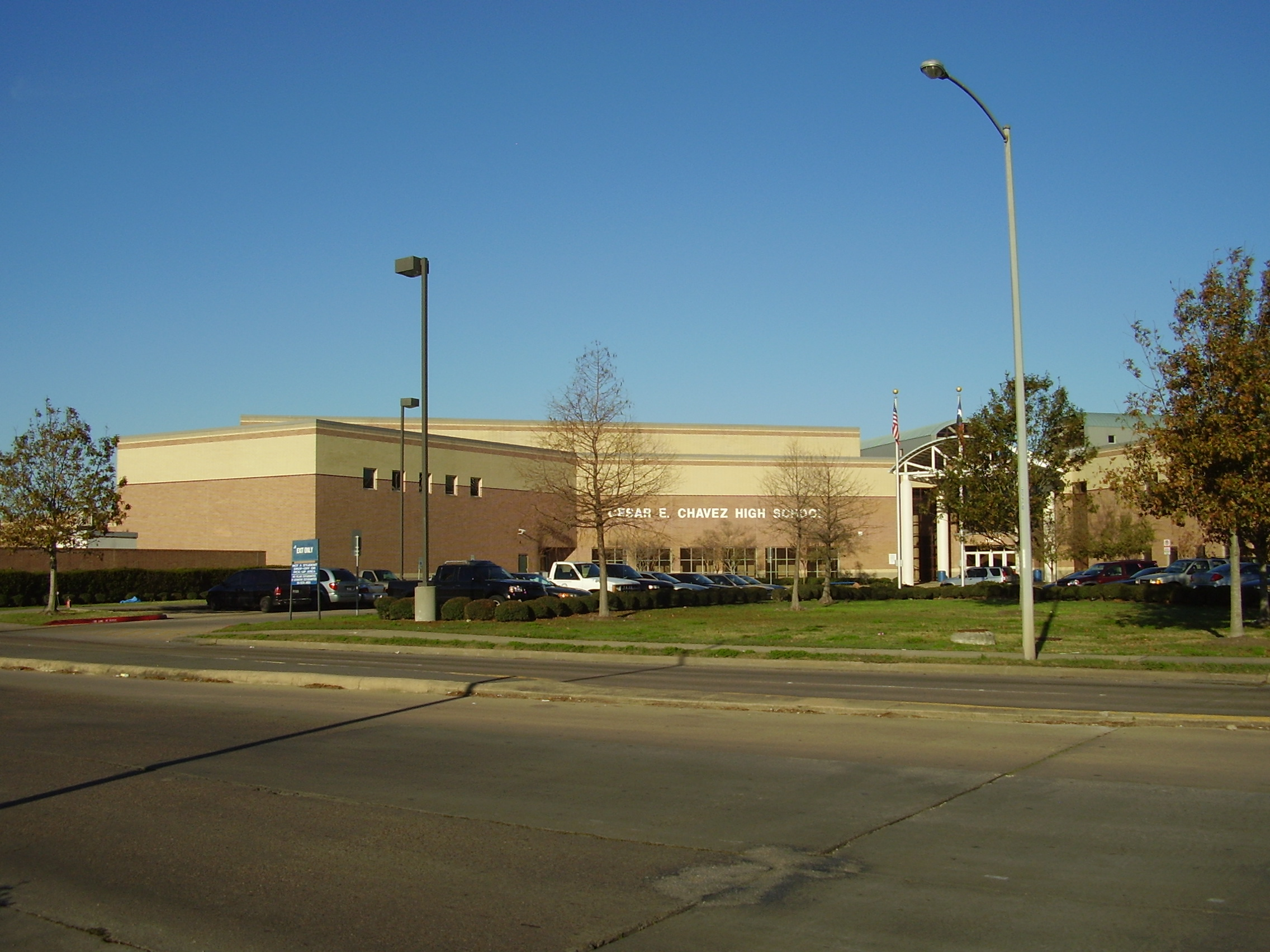
Chávez High School

- Chávez High School (Houston). The Houston Independent School District Board of Managers said on March 19, 2026, that the district would follow its established renaming process for the school, with any recommendation to be brought before the Board; the district simultaneously redesignated its March 30 student holiday as Farmworkers Day.
- César Chávez Elementary School (Fort Worth). Fort Worth ISD board took steps on April 14, 2026, to remove Chávez's name from district honors and begin renaming César Chávez Elementary School. On May 19, 2026, the board of managers unanimously voted to rename the school Esperanza Elementary School.
- César Chávez Elementary School (Little Elm). Renamed Little Elm Elementary School on April 20, 2026.

Washington, D.C.

- César Chávez Public Charter Schools for Public Policy. The school's board said in March 2026 that it would consider changing the name and engage in discussions with students and families.

Wisconsin

- César Chávez Elementary School (Madison). Madison Metropolitan School District voted on April 28, 2026 to initiate the process of renaming the school.

=== Post-secondary schools ===
Arizona

- César Chávez Building, formerly the Econ Building, University of Arizona (Tucson). University President Suresh Garimella announced in March 2026 that the university's Naming Advisory Committee would review whether to retain or reconsider the building's name, with a recommendation expected within 60 days.

California

- César E. Chávez Community Action Center, San Jose State University (San Jose). Name removed on March 20, 2026. Name changed temporarily to "Community Action Center", with plans for future renaming.
- César Chávez Building (A building), Santa Ana College (Santa Ana). Name plaques and murals covered up on March 19, 2026; college president announced plans to rename the building.
- César E. Chávez Department of Chicana and Chicano Studies, University of California, Los Angeles (Los Angeles). Department voted unanimously on March 18, 2026, to remove Chávez's name; UCLA's Honorific Naming Committee recommended removal on March 21, 2026. Formal approval by the UC president and UCLA chancellor is pending.
- Cesar Chavez Student Center, San Francisco State University (San Francisco). University announced on March 19, 2026, that it would "address the renaming" of the student union building.
- César Chávez Student Center, University of California, Berkeley (Berkeley). Name removed on April 16, 2026. Name changed temporarily to "Student Center", with plans for future renaming.
- César E. Chávez Student Services Center, Southwestern College (Chula Vista). Name removed on March 20, 2026.
- César E. Chávez Campus of San Diego Continuing Education (San Diego). Campus name temporarily changed following the allegations. San Diego Community College District later temporarily renamed the campus Harbor View campus while a permanent renaming process continued.

Colorado

- César Chávez Cultural Center, University of Northern Colorado (Greeley). University confirmed it was reviewing the name of the cultural center following the sexual abuse allegations.

Michigan

- Cesar Chavez Multicultural Center, Lansing Community College (Lansing). College announced it was reviewing the naming following the sexual abuse allegations.
- César Chávez Multicultural Lounge, University of Michigan (Ann Arbor). The lounge was formerly located in Mosher-Jordan Hall; University of Michigan materials described a Chávez mural as having been displayed in the César Chávez Lounge at the Mosher-Jordan "Mo-Jo" Student Residence Hall, and a university-hosted history page says the lounge was dedicated in 1995 in the former Mosher-Jordan Multi-Purpose Lounge. The lounge no longer appears in the university's current list of named multicultural lounges.
- Cesar E. Chavez Collection / Colección Cesar E. Chavez, Michigan State University Libraries (East Lansing). The named browsing collection is located in the first-floor west wing lobby of MSU's Main Library. In 2026, MSU Libraries said the collection would remain available while the libraries gathered input from campus stakeholders and community members to select a new name for it.

New York

- Chávez Hall, Stony Brook University (Brookhaven). Stony Brook University announced in March 2026 that it had begun a building-renaming review process for Chávez Hall; any new names would be considered for implementation in fall 2026.

Oregon

- Colegio Cesar Chavez (closed 1983)
