= Cesar Chavez Boulevard =

Cesar Chavez Boulevard may refer to:

- Cesar Chavez Boulevard (Dallas, Texas), formerly Central Expressway
- Cesar Chavez Boulevard (Portland, Oregon), formerly 39th Avenue
- Cesar Chavez Boulevard (San Antonio, Texas), east–west throughfare of Downtown San Antonio
