= Colegio Cesar Chavez =

First accredited Latino college in the United States

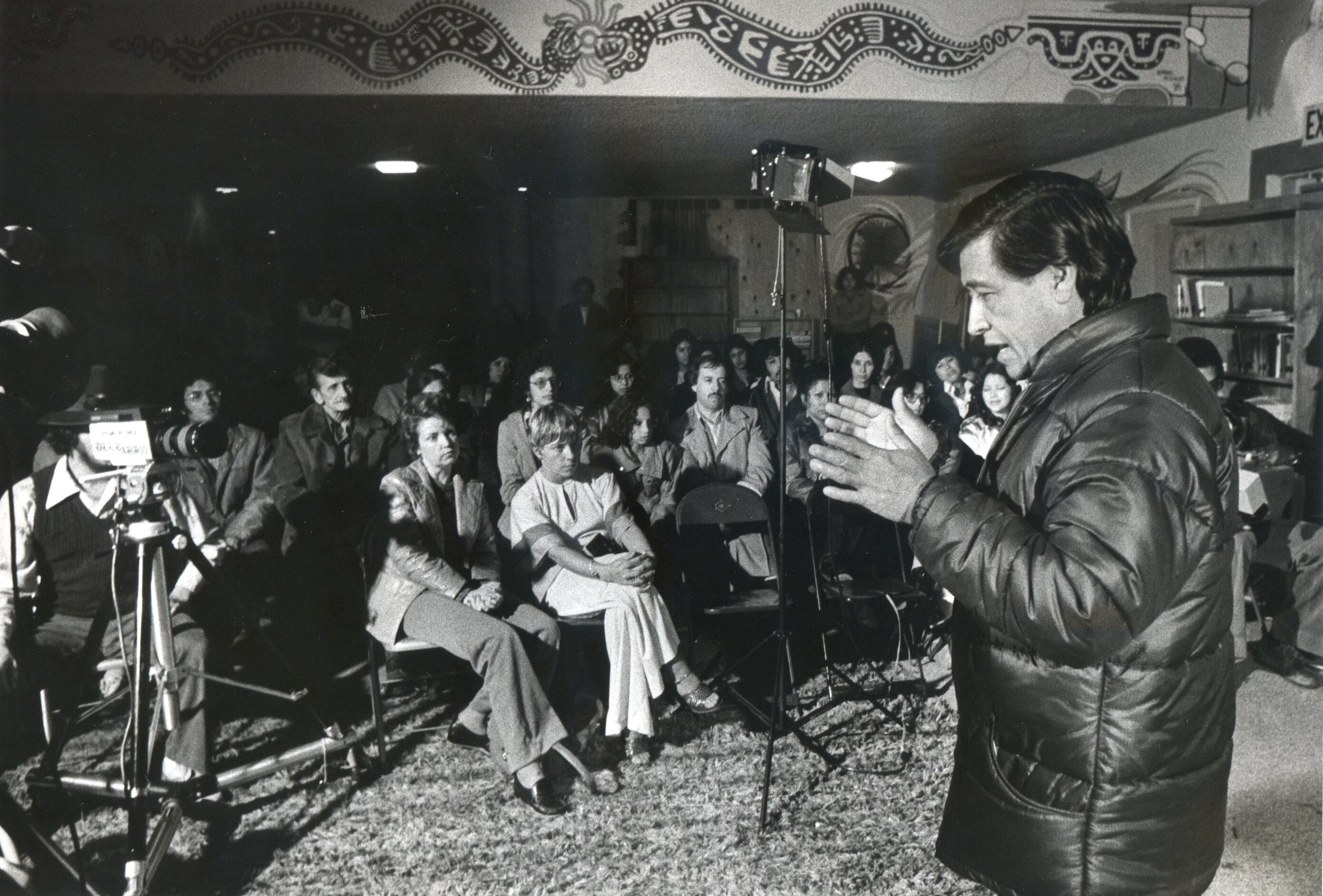
- Cesar Chavez lecturing at Colegio Cesar Chavez, 1977
- Type: Private
- Active: 1973–1983
- Location: Mount Angel, Oregon, United States

Colegio Cesar Chavez (Spanish for "Cesar Chavez College") was an American college-without-walls in Mount Angel, Oregon, United States. The college was named after Mexican-American civil rights activist César Chávez. Colegio was established in 1973 and closed in 1983. Colegio was the first accredited, independent four-year Chicano/Latino college in the United States. In 1975 it was granted candidacy status from the Northwest Association of Schools and Colleges. In 1977, Colegio granted degrees to 22 graduates, a number exceeding the combined number of Chicanos who graduated that same year from University of Oregon and Oregon State University. In his book Colegio Cesar Chavez, 1973–1983: A Chicano Struggle for Educational Self-Determination, author Carlos Maldonado writes that Colegio Cesar Chavez was one of the few institutions that was named after Cesar Chavez during his lifetime.

== Evolution ==
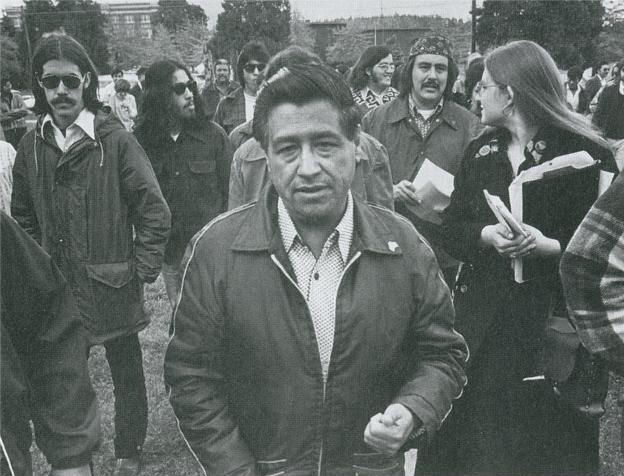
Cesar Chavez visiting the campus in 1974

For many members of the Colegio community, the most memorable campus event occurred on May 16, 1974, when Cesar Chavez paid his first visit to the college.... More than 600 people, mostly Mexican Americans, crowded into Guadalupe Hall to see and hear Chavez.... Chavez devoted most of his speech to the union's fight with the growers, making his case for the boycott. But he also talked about Colegio, confessing that, if someone had told him five years earlier that Mexican Americans would have established their own college in Oregon, he ‘would have thought they were crazy.’ ‘Who knows?’ he added. ‘Maybe tomorrow there will be mariachi music in the White House.’

Colegio Cesar Chavez evolved from various other collegial institutions that had existed in Mount Angel, Oregon for nearly a century. In 1888, the Catholic Order of the Benedictine Sisters founded Mt. Angel Academy. The Academy was originally a female charter academy but later evolved into a normal school in 1897 to train women for careers in education. In 1947, Mt. Angel Normal School was renamed Mt. Angel Women's College and, with accreditation from the Northwest Accrediting Association, it granted a Bachelor of Science degree in elementary education. In 1957, Mt. Angel Women's College became coeducational and was renamed Mt. Angel College.

By 1966 Mt. Angel College was facing financial problems for which it received two federal loans which it used to expand the campus. Within the next seven years, Mt. Angel College found itself burdened by a one million dollar debt and low student enrollment. In 1977, Ernesto Lopez became Dean of Students of Mt. Angel College and Sonny Montes became Director of Ethnic Affairs and minority recruiter. By 1972, Mt. Angel College had a student body of only 250, only 37 of whom were of Mexican American descent.

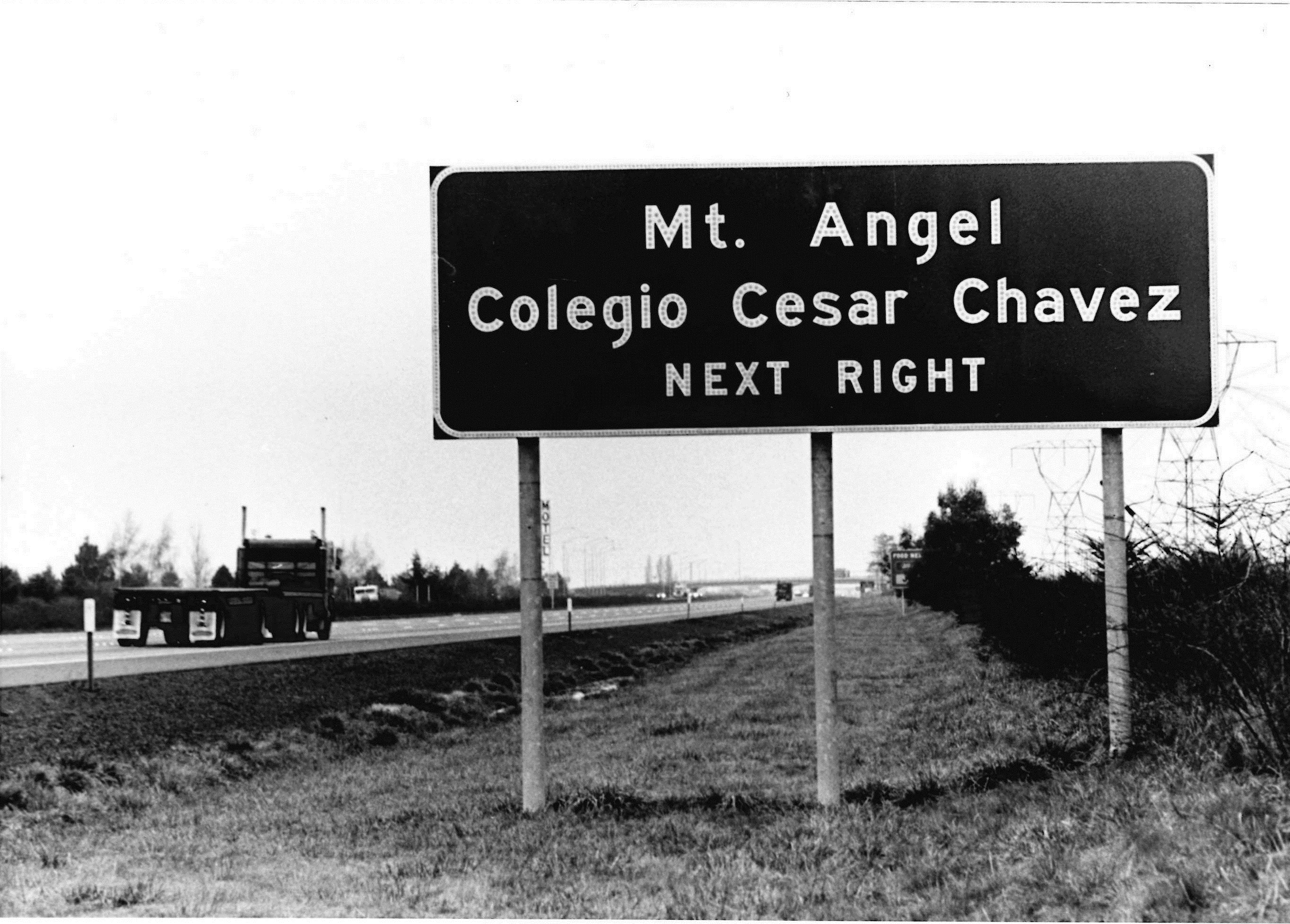
Road sign to Colegio Cesar Chavez.

Citing the Mt. Angel College's financial instability and low enrollment, the Northwest Association of Schools and Colleges withdrew the college's accreditation. In light of such bleak signs, most students and staff left the college. Sonny Montes, Ernesto Lopez, and four others decided to attempt to salvage the college by redirecting its focus. On December 12, 1973, Mt. Angel College was renamed Colegio Cesar Chavez. In 1975, Colegio was granted accreditation candidacy from the same association that had withdrawn Mt. Angel College's accreditation. Colegio aimed to create a four-year college completely under the control of a staff chiefly of Mexican American, or Chicano, descent. Colegio was also structured on an experimental educational model known as a "college without walls" program.

Previous to settling on the name "Colegio Cesar Chavez", staff had considered three other names for the college: "Colegio Che Guevara", "Colegio Ho Chi Minh", and "Colegio Virgen de Guadalupe". César Chávez's name was chosen because he was one of the key figures in the Chicano movement, often organizing boycotts and protests for farm workers in California and eventually throughout the entire Pacific Northwest. The majority of Mexican Americans in the Pacific Northwest had migrated to the region during the World War II era in search of work as farm laborers.

The students were able to get Cesar Chavez's help in renegotiating the debt with HUD. The Chicano militants put together a staff and recruited students. Together, they were making ends meet and had gotten past the first steps toward full accreditation. As a volunteer, I helped them in obtaining a Dean's Grant for bilingual education. I also began an international education course of study with Mexico at the Colegio. —José Ángel Gutiérrez

== College without walls program ==
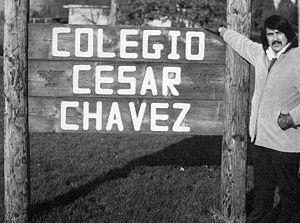
Jose Romero, co-founder of Colegio Cesar Chavez

Colegio Cesar Chavez operated under the "El Colegio Sin Paredes" ("The College Without Walls") model. This model granted students the ability to actively engage with their community, to maintain control of their own education, and to combine their classroom studies with experience outside of the classroom.

The College Without Walls Program had been established by the Union for Experimenting Colleges and Universities. This format allowed for the inclusion of a wide range of age groups, encouraged the participation and collaboration of students, staff, and administrators in creating and implementing the curriculum. Alternative means of evaluation was also encouraged. In this program, instructors were redefined as facilitators in the learning process. Additionally, Colegio staff, administration, and students relations were structured in accordance to a framework that Colegio termed "La Familia," meaning "The Family". To that end, the "family" members were encouraged to participate in the decisions affecting the college. Such a framework inevitably required for students to be self-motivated and to initiate and pursue an independent course of education.

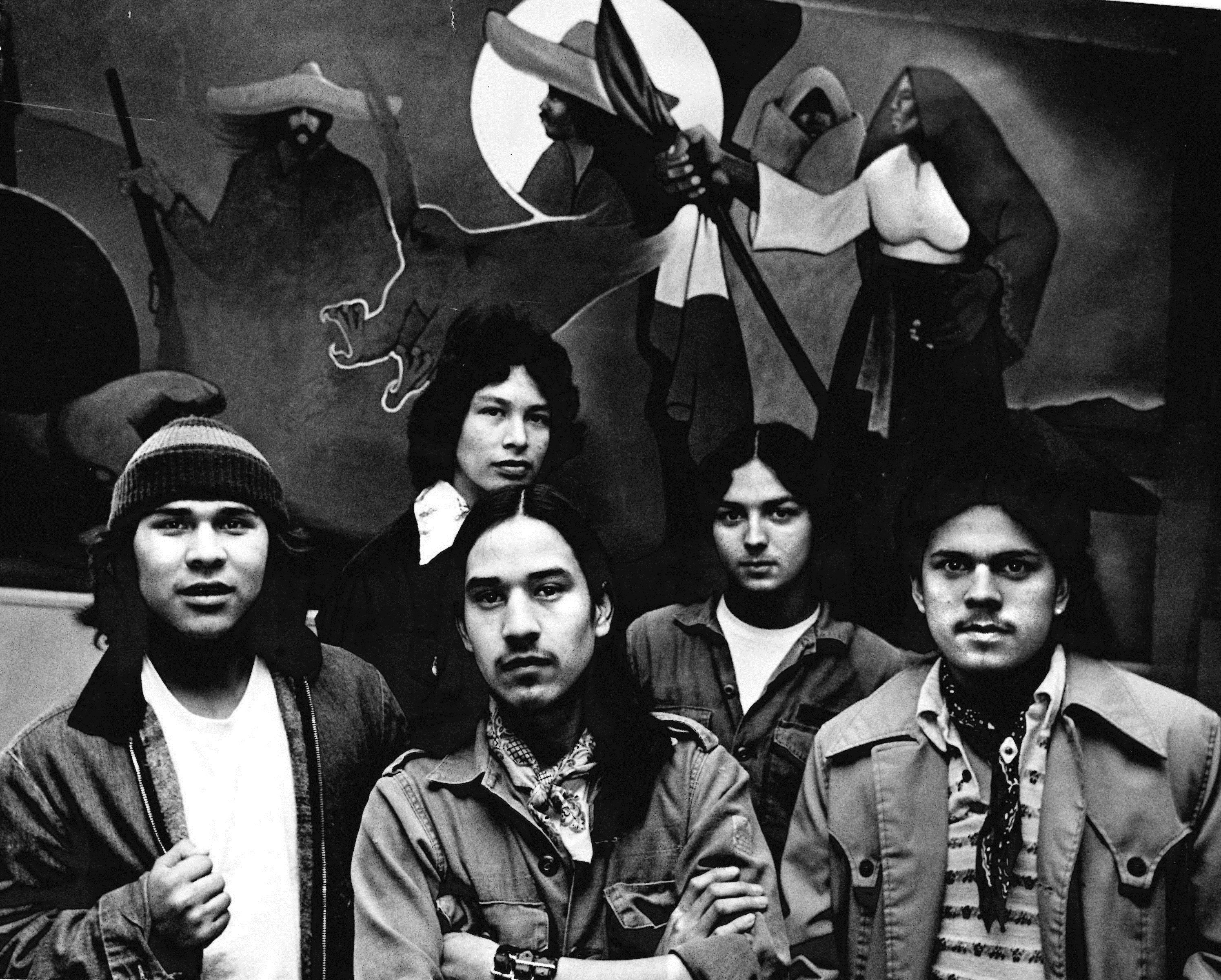
Colegio students pose in front of a mural they painted in the main campus building.

Colegio's core educational foundation consisted of work in four areas: Social Science (Anthropology, Economics, Political Science, Psychology, Sociology); the Humanities (Literature, History, Arts, Philosophy, Language); Natural Sciences and Mathematics; oral and written bilingual Communications. Each student was required to complete fifteen credit hours in each area, totaling 60 credit hours. Credit transfers from parallel areas was allowed. Students could also receive credit for prior learning.

== Leadership ==
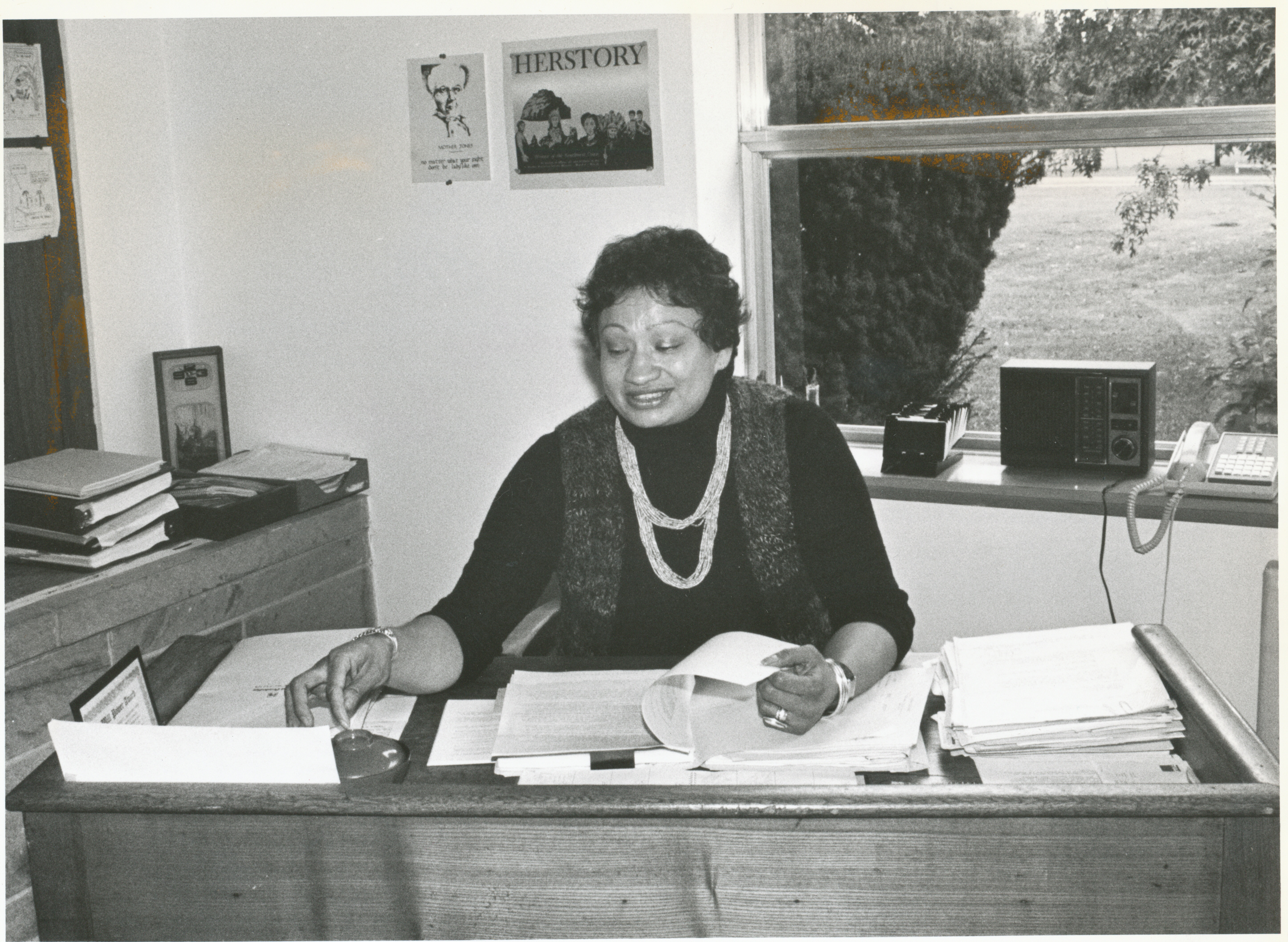
Irma Gonzalez, last Colegio president, in her office in 1981

From its inception, the leadership of Colegio Cesar Chavez was in a constant state of flux. In its brief ten years, Colegio was served by four administrations. Each administration faced substantial institutional crises. In 1973, Ernesto Lopez, former Academic Dean and Acting President of Mt. Angel College, became Colegio's first President. Lopez retained this position for only one year. After the departure of Lopez, the position of administrative head was altered into a co-directorship. Sonny Montes was named Director of Administration. Jose Romero was named Director of Academics. The split into two co-directors was made in an attempt to relieve the overwhelming duties that Lopez had faced.

Sonny Montes did not possess an advanced degree, as had Lopez, and he had far less experience working in higher education than had Lopez. Montez' organizing abilities and many contacts within the Chicano Movement were compensations. It was during the joint Montes-Romero administration that Colegio Cesar Chavez received accreditation candidacy on June 18, 1975, from the Northwest Association of Schools and Colleges. Sonny Montes retired as Colegio administrator in October 1977, citing personal and economic concerns. He was extended an invitation to serve on Colegio's board, which he accepted.

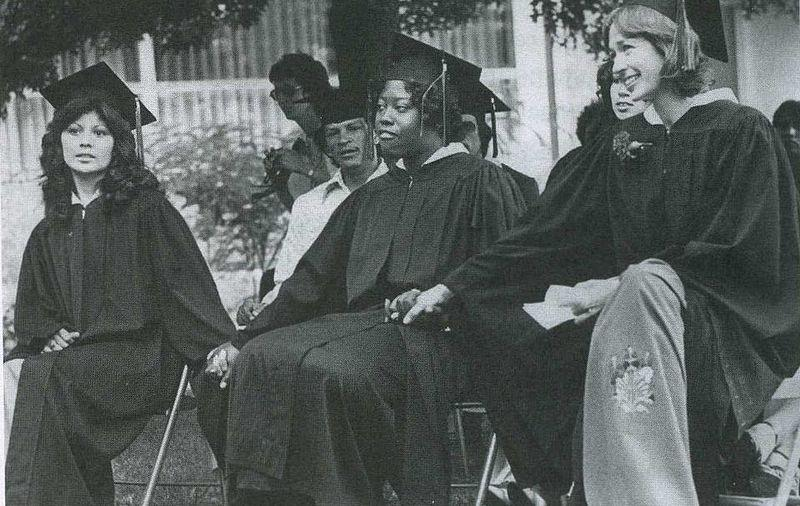
Colegio graduating class, 1977

Salvador Ramirez followed Sonny Montes, becoming Colegio's top administrator in 1977. Ramirez, who held a master's degree in history, had served Colegio as history teacher since mid-1976. His previous work experience included employment with University of Colorado at Boulder and Washington State University. During Ramirez' tenure, Colegio finalized its negotiations with HUD. Ramirez resigned from his position at Colegio in 1979.

Irma Flores Gonzales, previously a member of both Colegio's board and staff, became president of Colegio in 1979. Gonzales held a B.A. in education and a M.A. in psychology. It was during Gonzales' time as president that Colegio faced its greatest challenges: difficulty in developing and maintaining a financial base; preparing Colegio for accreditation by June 1981; and expanding college enrollment. During Gonzales' time as president, Colegio staff succumbed to infighting. By this point, many activists within the Chicano Movement had become disillusioned with Colegio. Gonzales was Colegio's last president.

== Facilities ==
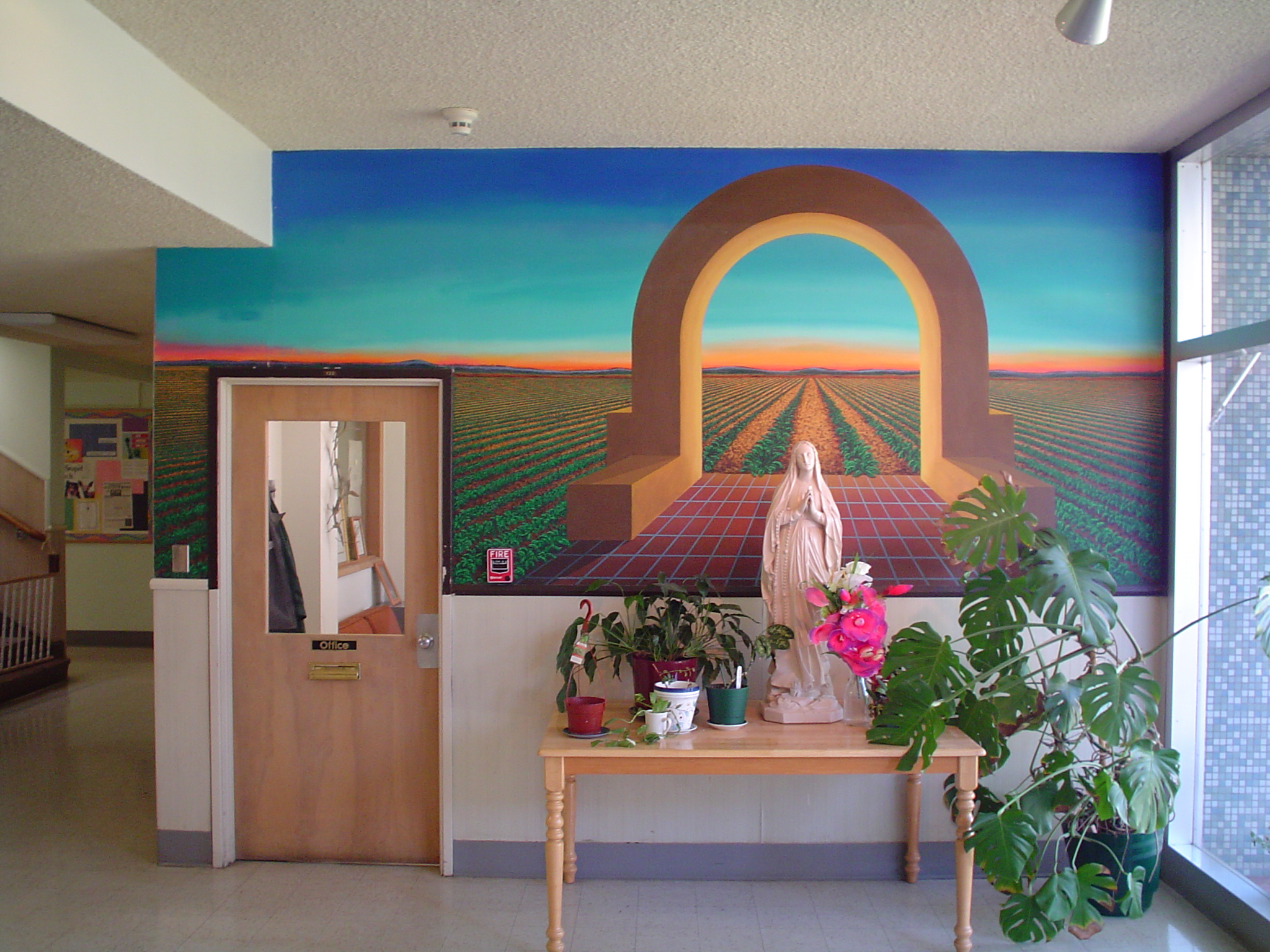
College Without Walls mural by Daniel Desiga

One of the larger paintings at the colegio depicts a seemingly endless abundantly fertile field. As with so many of the murals, the sun is a significant component; here, it plays just beyond the horizon, with the overall warmth and seductiveness of the image suggesting the promise of an imminent sunrise rather than a sunset. The scene is viewed through a golden portal set on a patio in the foreground and may represent, as PSU's (Tony) Cabello suggests, the opportunity that is possible for the immigrant to el norte. The painting abuts another portal – the main entrance to the colegio building – providing an ironic contrast to the short-lived promise of opportunity embodied in the colegio's operation.

Colegio Cesar Chavez's main campus building was the two-story administrative building called Huelga Hall. ("Huelga" [pronounced welga] is Spanish for "strike".) When it was a part of Mount Angel College, Huelga Hall was known as Marmion Hall and was used as the campus dormitory for women. Huelga Hall was the hub of campus activity and was where most classes were held. The walls of Huelga Hall were covered with large Mexican-themed murals, some in the style of Diego Rivera, others being transcriptions of ancient Aztec artwork. In the main reception room there was a mural of Argentine revolutionary Che Guevara near the fireplace. To the north of Huelga Hall stood two buildings that served as dormitories for Colegio students.

Colegio also owned two homes. Directly behind Huelga Hall was the Art Building. The Art Building was a two-story farm house in the Victorian style. It had been built in the mid-1900s by the Bernt family of Mt. Angel. When Mount Angel College took possession of the Bernt house, it was renamed Studio San Benito. Under Colegio's ownership, the house was referred to as the Art Building. The Art Building lay vacant and unused for most of Colegio's existence until when in 1980 it was occupied by the family of Arthur Omar Olivo. Mr. Olivo was the grounds keeper and facilities maintenance manager of Colegio César Chávez. After a falling out with Colegio president Irma Gonzales, the Olivo family vacated the Art Building in 1982 shortly before Colegio's closure. Beside the Art House stood another two-story house that was referred to as the Pottery Building. Both the Pottery Building and the Art Building were demolished in the mid-1980s.

On the other side of Main Street, across from Huelga Hall, Colegio maintained Guadalupe Hall, a building named in honor of Our Lady of Guadalupe.

== Legacy ==
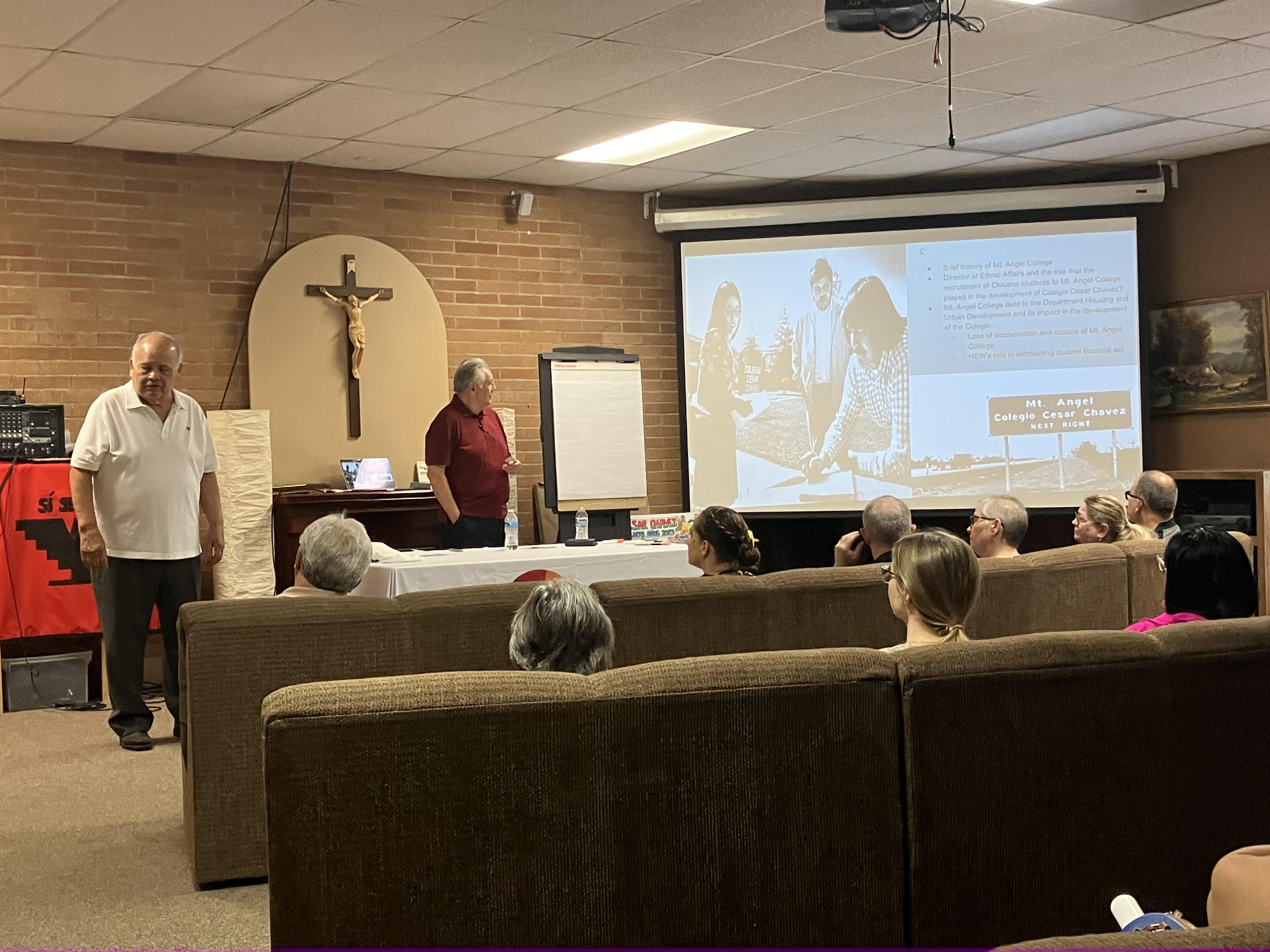
Sonny Montes and Jose Romero, founders of Colegio Cesar Chavez, speaking at the college's 50-year anniversary. This event was held on the former grounds of the college, in what was then known as "Guadalupe Hall." August 26, 2023.

It would be difficult to make the case that Colegio Cesar Chavez played a significant role in the history of U.S. higher education.... As a symbol, however, it was very important. For five years, the Colegio's struggle for survival was a recurring front-page news story in the Pacific Northwest, and its leaders became well known to the public.... While there was more to the Chicano movement in the Pacific Northwest in the mid-1970s than the struggle of the Colegio, no other component of that movement attracted as much public attention.

— Glenn Anthony May

After the closure of Colegio Cesar Chavez, the facilities and grounds were left unused and abandoned for several years. Eventually, a private benefactor purchased the former Colegio grounds and facilities and donated it back to its pre-Colegio owners, the Benedictine Sisters of Mt. Angel. Today, the former Colegio grounds and facilities are used as St. Joseph Shelter. Shortly after reclaiming ownership of the former Colegio building, the Benedictine Sisters had all but one Colegio-era mural painted over. The one remaining mural is titled "College Without Walls" and was created by Daniel Desiga. The mural depicts an arch entry overlooking a vast strawberry field. The arch has been interpreted as representing the college without walls program of Colegio, and the vast strawberry field in the background is likely a reference to the field workers and the fact that many Colegio teachers and students had either worked in the fields or were from families who had survived by means of field work.

In his book Colegio Cesar Chavez, 1973–1983: A Chicano Struggle for Educational Self-Determination, to date the only full-length book about Colegio, author Carlos Maldonado writes that Colegio was often referred to as "the longest running death in history", and that study of Colegio Cesar Chavez will "help promoters of new ethnic institutions to raise questions of feasibility, anticipate problems, and provide direction in the establishment of new and more sophisticated institutions." Maldonado claims that Colegio's staff was small and relatively inexperienced and therefore unprepared for the challenges of starting a new college. Eventually the staff succumbed to infighting. Maldonado also claims that it was difficult to foster an on-campus sense of community among staff and students because Colegio was a college-without-walls program. The author notes that Colegio was founded during a time of downturn in activism in the Chicano Movement. Colegio was founded during a period of growing political conservatism marked by less federal support for cultural programs. Colegio was founded in a small rural town whose population largely disliked Colegio's predecessor of Mount Angel College and therefore saw Colegio as an extension of Mount Angel College. The surrounding community was relatively prejudiced against Mexican Americans. Lastly, Colegio was named in honor of a man many local farm owners found controversial.

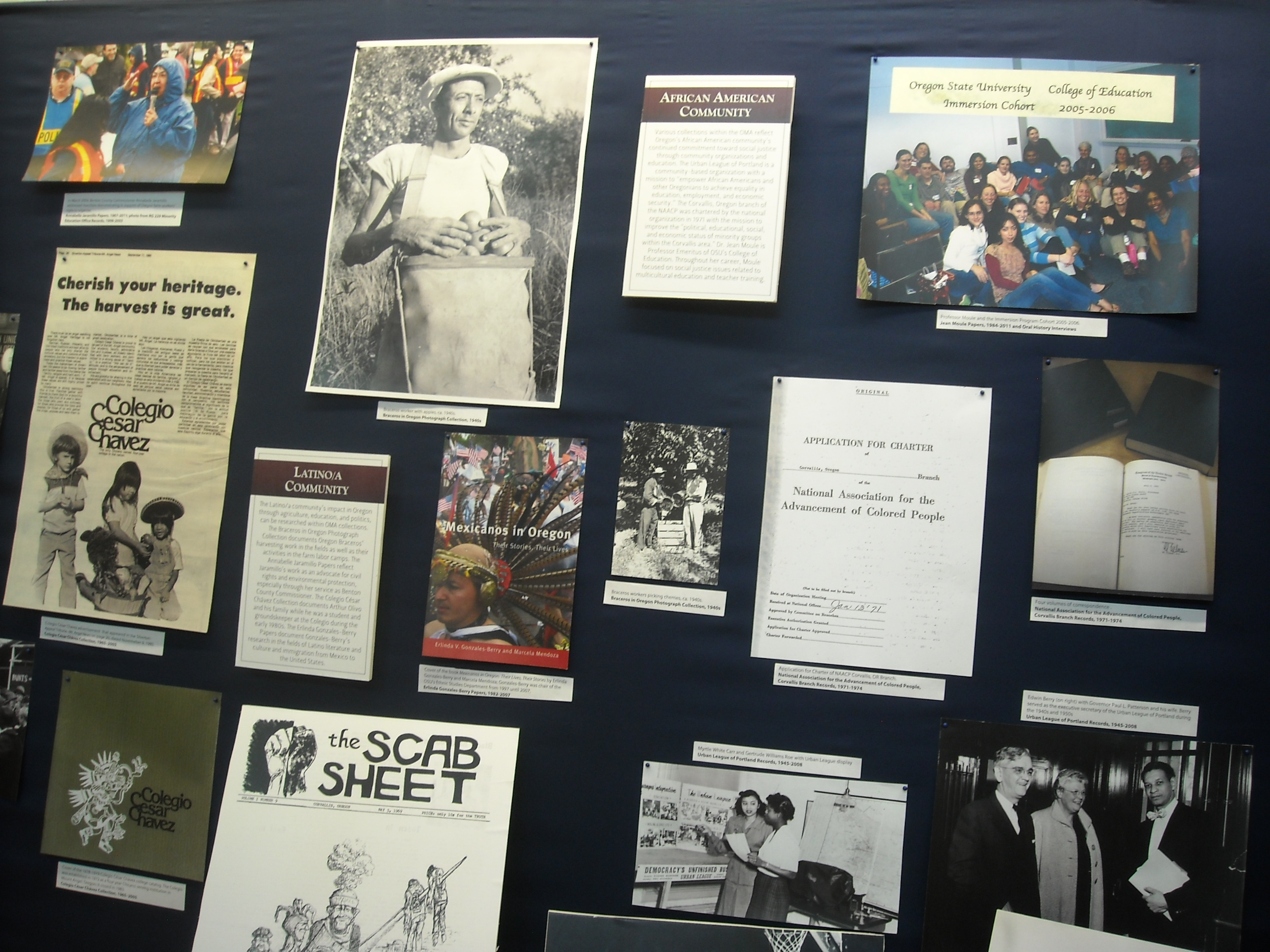
OSU Multicultural Archives displays an advertisement for Colegio Cesar Chavez, as well as a student handbook.

On its website the Oregon Historical Society writes, "Structured as a 'college-without-walls,' more than 100 students took classes in Chicano Studies, early childhood development, and adult education. Significant financial and administrative problems caused Colegio to close in 1983. Its history represents the success of a grassroots movement."

Cesar Chavez's United Farmworkers union is not present in the state of Oregon. Instead, the main union for farm workers in the state of Oregon is Pineros y Campesinos Unidos del Noroeste. The meetings which led to the formation of PCUN were held at Colegio Cesar Chavez. PCUN's founder, the late Cipriano Ferrel, attended Colegio Cesar Chavez.

In 2009, Oregon Public Broadcasting published an article titled "What is Cesar Chavez's Connection to Oregon?" The article centers on the controversial public debate at the time regarding whether a Portland street should be named in honor of Cesar Chavez. Those opposed to honoring Chavez with a Portland street had occasionally argued that the activist had no presence in the state. The article contains an interview with a man who assisted Chavez during a public address he made at the state Capitol in Salem, Oregon. The article concludes with an interview with Joseph Gallegos, an early faculty member of Colegio Cesar Chavez who claims that during the 1970s and 1980s "the Colegio was a critical symbol of our presence, the Latino presence here in the state, and also I think trying to bring attention to the problem the Colegio was trying to address, that Latinos were not getting through the four-year institutions."

Victor Paredes wrote that Cesar Chavez cared deeply about education, and that "Thus the greatest honor he may have received during his lifetime was the opening of the Colegio Cesar Chavez in Oregon."

We were establishing a Chicano college in a community that had been hostile to Cesar Chavez and what the name and the movement meant, a community that viewed Spanish-speakers more as farm workers and not as college students, a community that liked to drive by at night and shoot bullet holes in our signs. But we made it, and we gave the community – not just the one in the Willamette Valley but throughout the state – something to rally about. I recently made a trip to Mt. Angel and discovered that in a way it is still alive. The murals are still there and the campus is in good shape. The sisters have reopened it as a residence for farm workers. When I see that the buildings are being used and that there are farm workers living in the dorms, and that there are training programs going on and that there's shelter there, I feel it wasn't a lost cause.

— Jose Romero, co-founder of Colegio Cesar Chavez

== Notable alumni ==
- Cipriano Ferrel, founder of Pineros y Campesinos Unidos del Noroeste, the farmworker's union in Oregon, graduated with a bachelor's degree from Colegio Cesar Chavez in 1977.

== Image gallery ==
=== Colegio Cesar Chavez Collection ===
Oregon State University maintains and displays the Colegio Cesar Chavez Collection. The collection consists of documents and photographs pertaining to the life and work of Arthur Omar Olivo. Mr. Olivo had been born in a migrant camp in Texas to parents from Mexico. Later, the family would move to San Jose, California where Mr. Olivo would work for an organization called Center for Employment Training, a job training program whose students are mostly Latino and which was funded in part by the Cesar Chavez's United Farm Workers union. It was during this period, in the 1960s and 1970s, that Mr. Olivo came to be friends with Cesar Chavez. In the late 1970s, Mr. Olivo moved his family to the state of Oregon in order to found an Oregon branch of Center for Employment Training. During the late 1970s and early 1980s, Mr. Olivo was involved with Colegio Cesar Chavez as both a student and as facilities manager, and he and his family also lived on the college grounds in Mount Angel, Oregon. Items from the Colegio Cesar Chavez collection are available for individual research and are occasionally on display at OSU events regarding the Multicultural Archives.

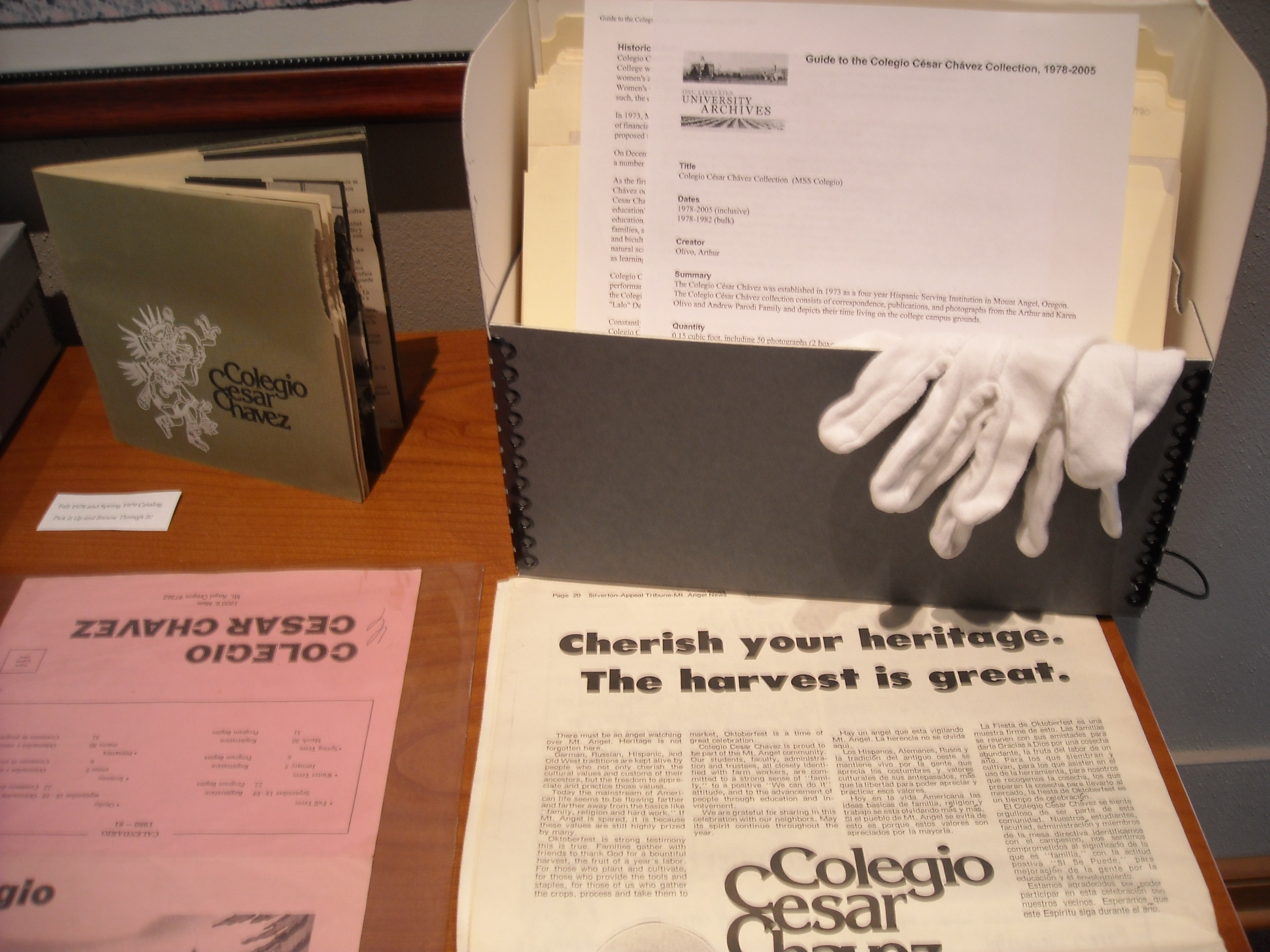
Colegio Cesar Chavez Collection on display at OSU event

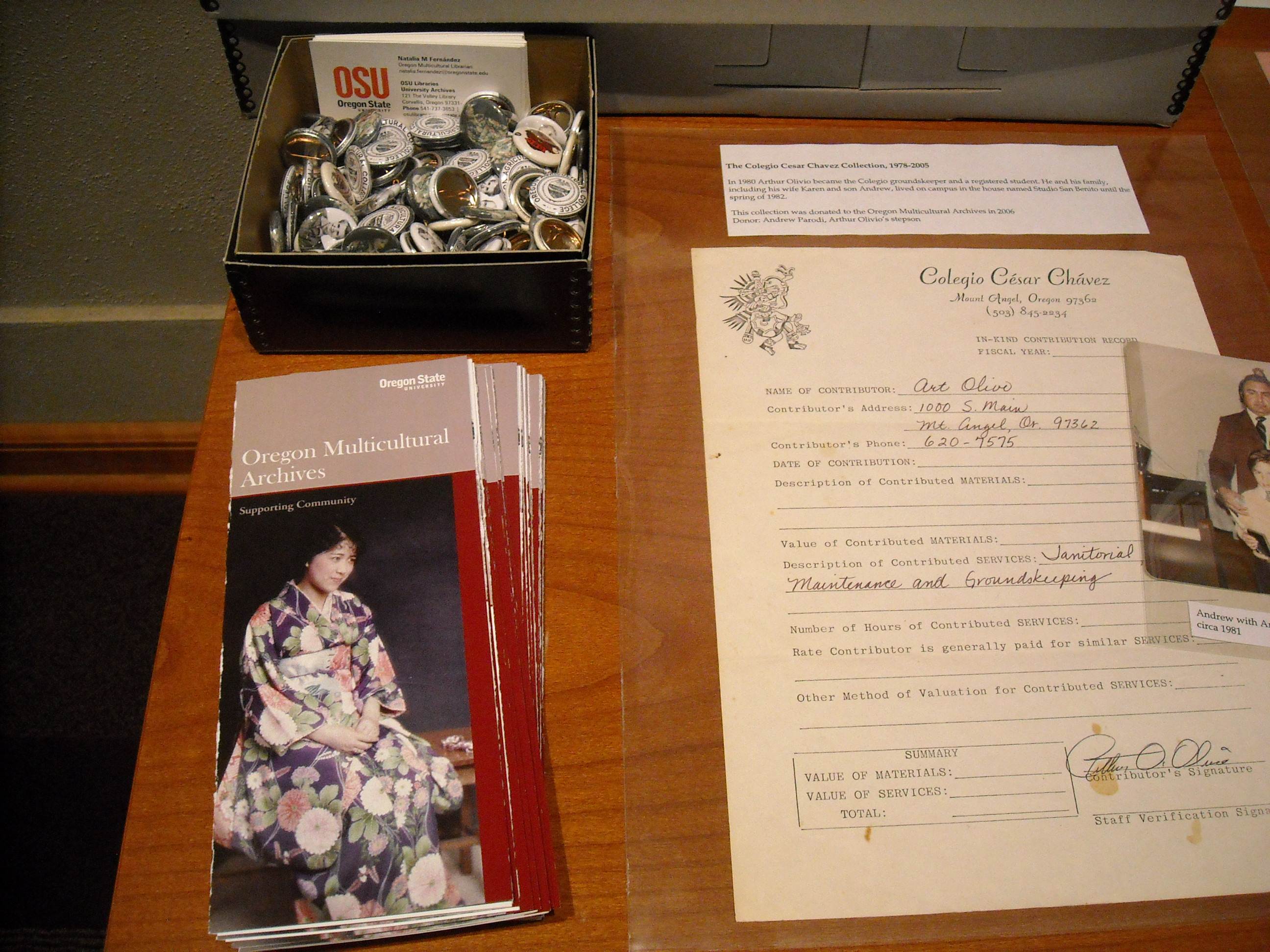
A form Mr. Olivo had filled out during his time as student at Colegio Cesar Chavez

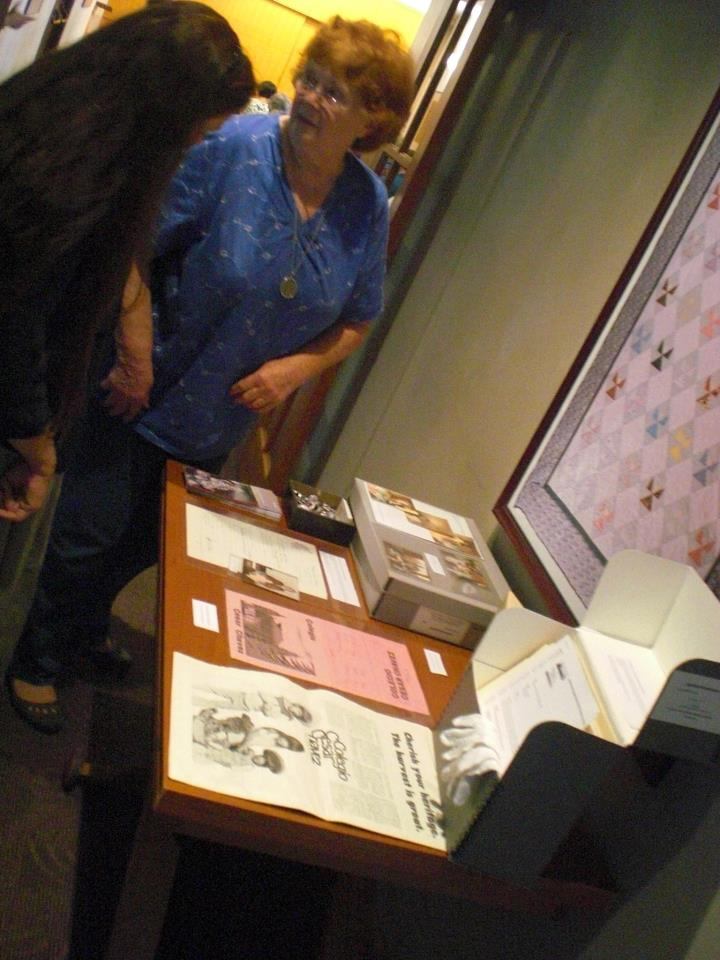
Colegio Cesar Chavez Collection is shown to attendees of OSU event

=== Chicano poetry reading ===
Four candids of a poetry reading by Chicano poet Alurista at Colegio César Chávez, circa 1981. Note mural of Che Guevara on wall.

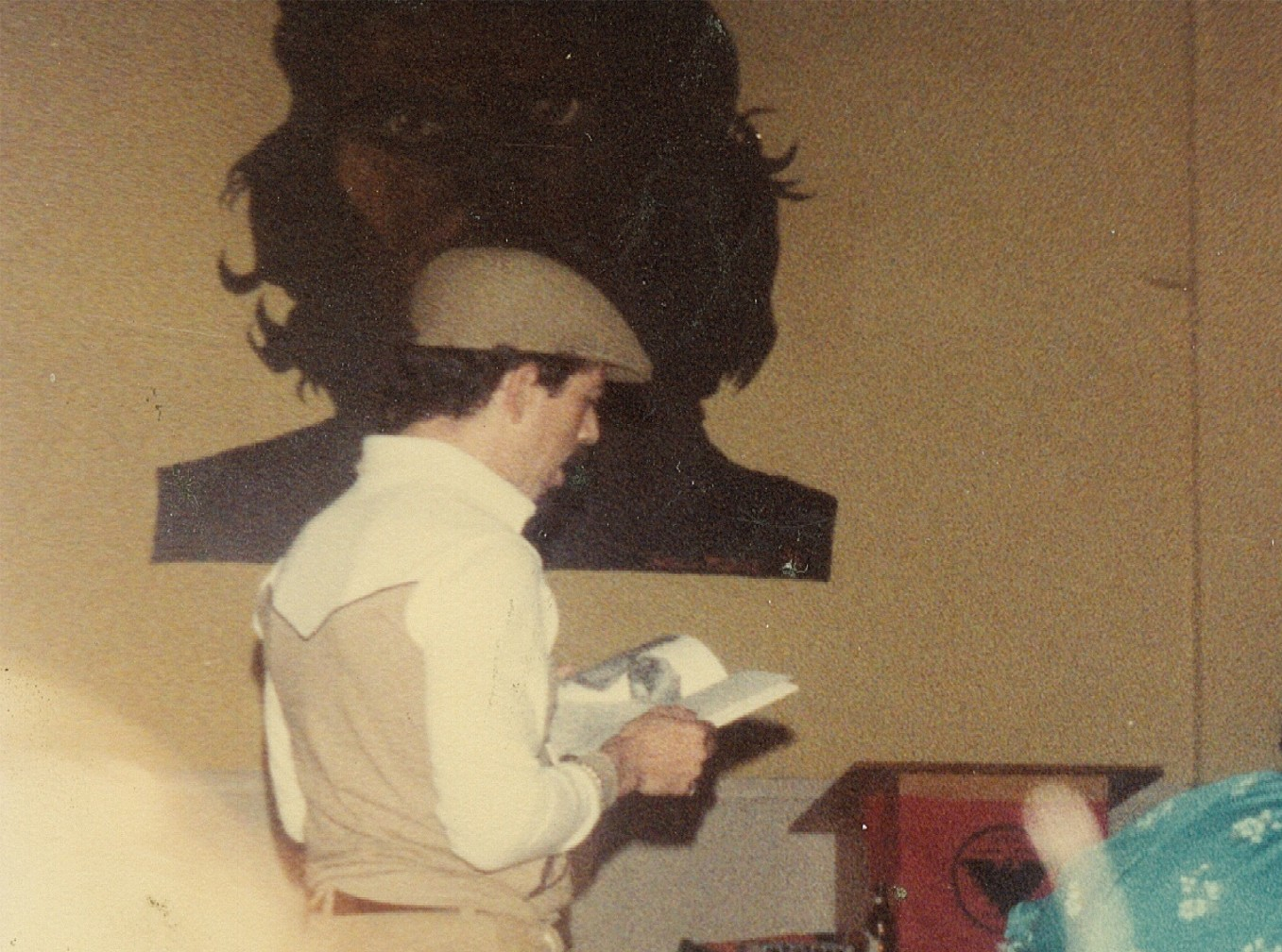

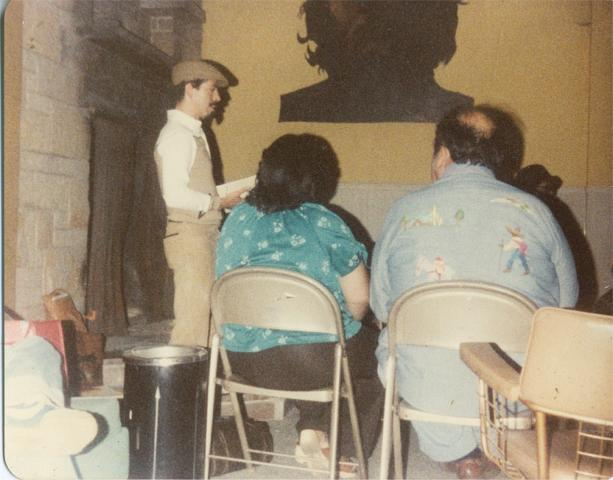

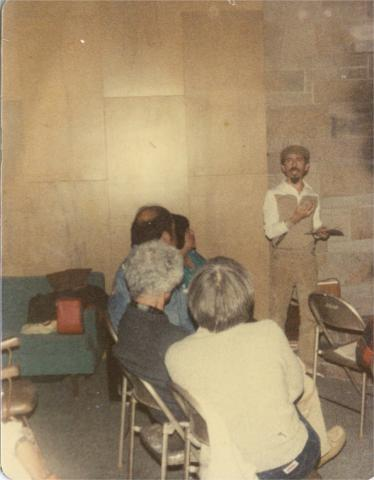
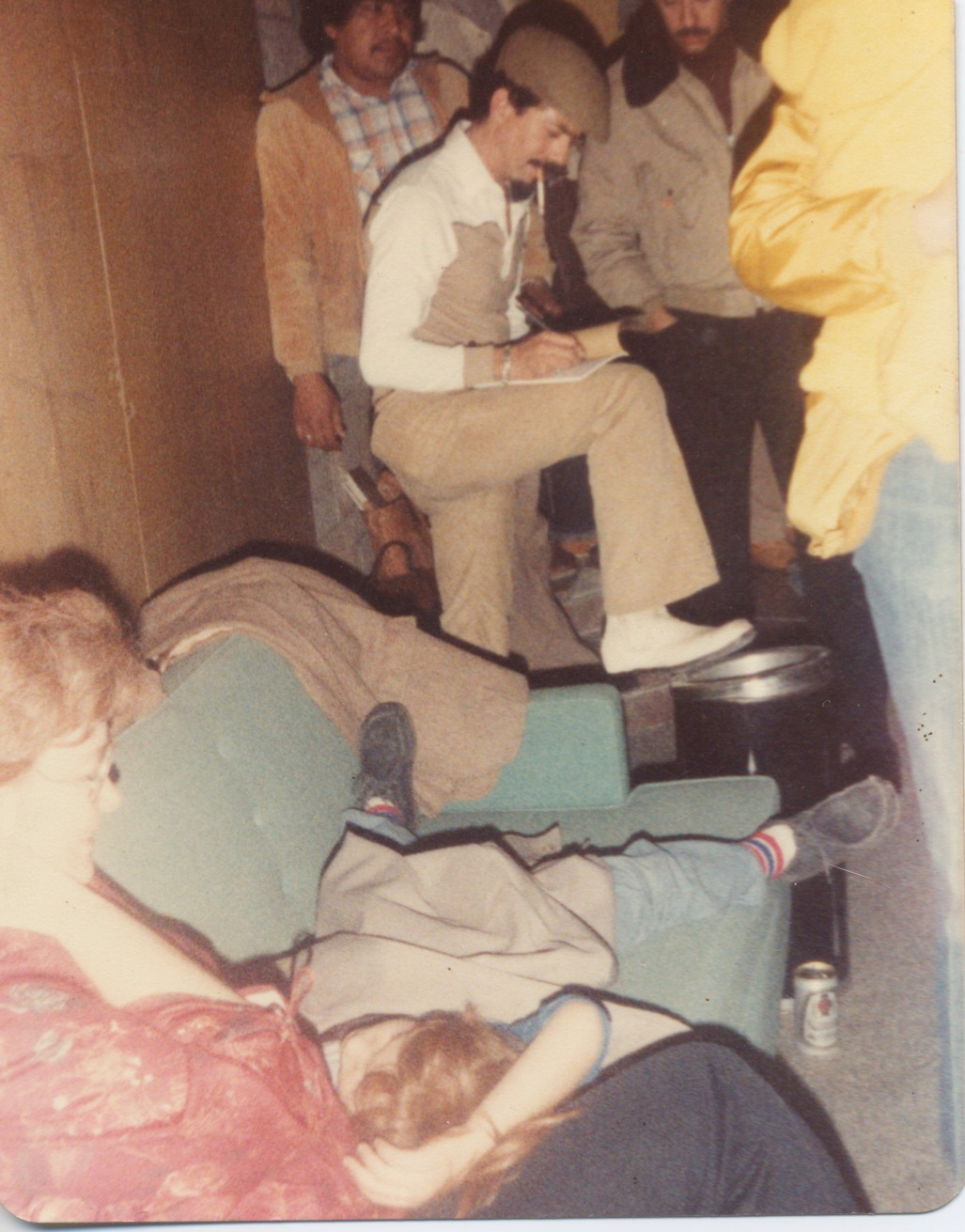

=== Community gatherings and various candids ===
Below are candids of community activities in Colegio, circa early 1980s. Aztec-themed murals can be seen on the walls.

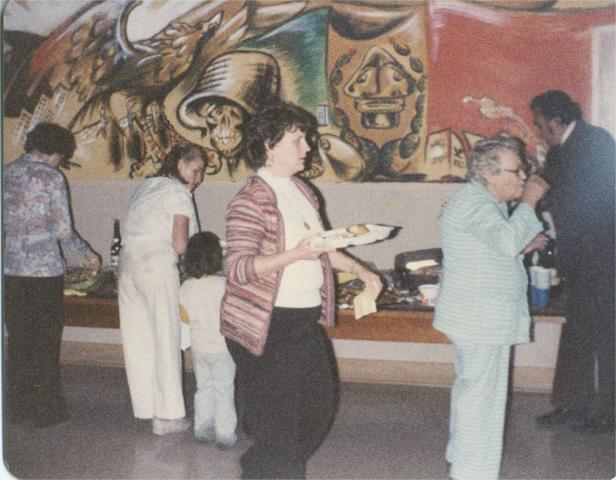

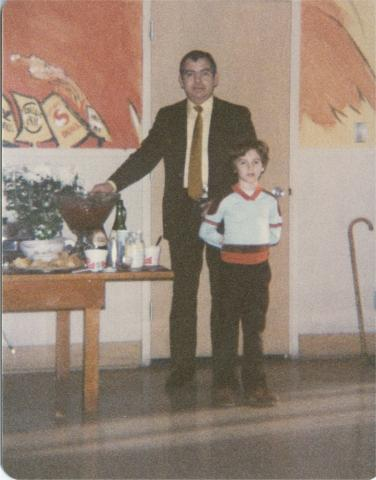
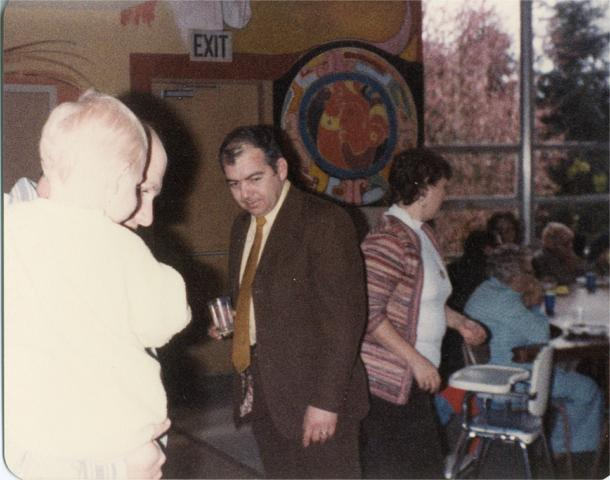

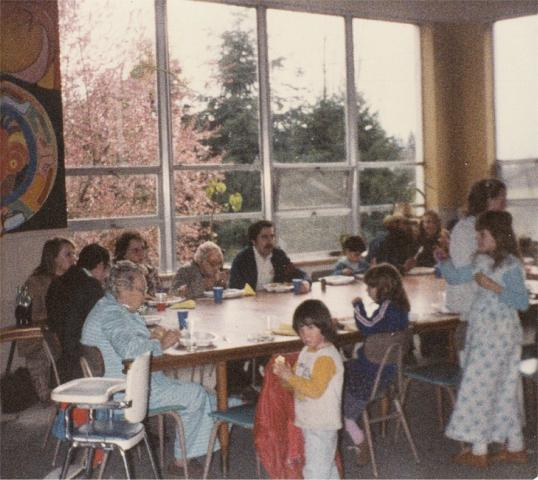

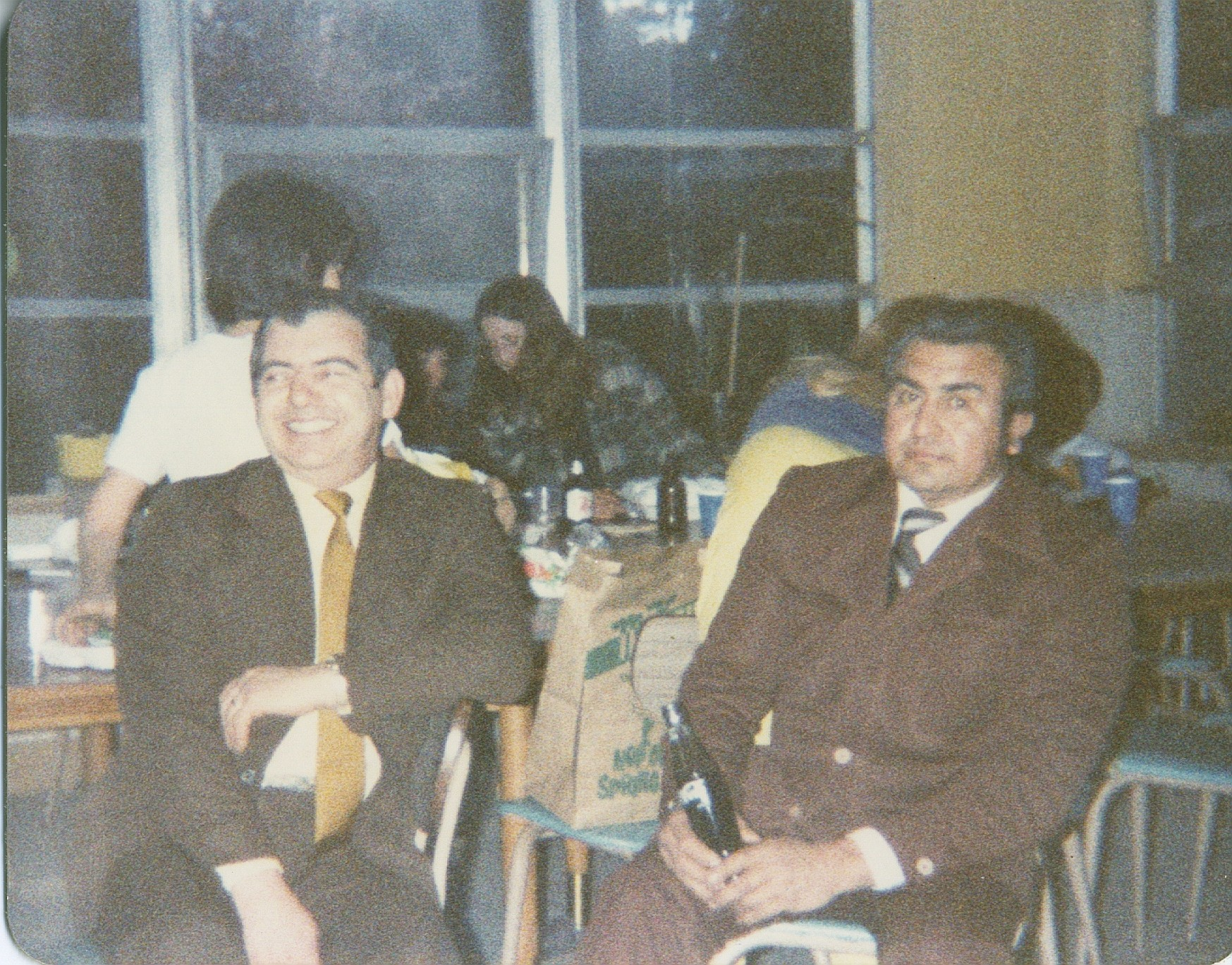
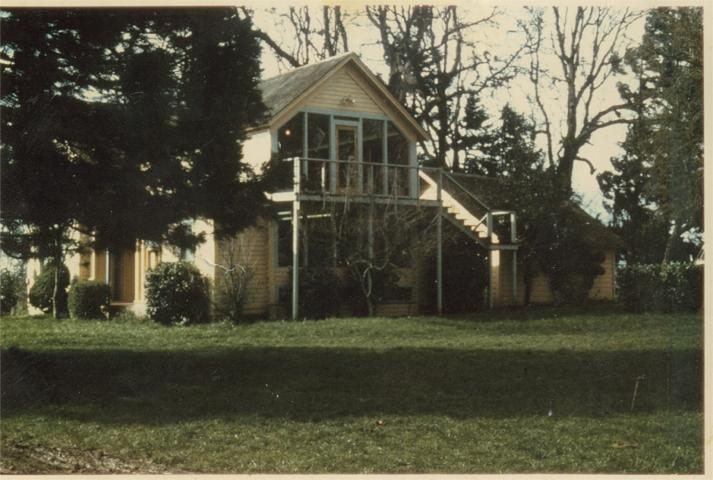

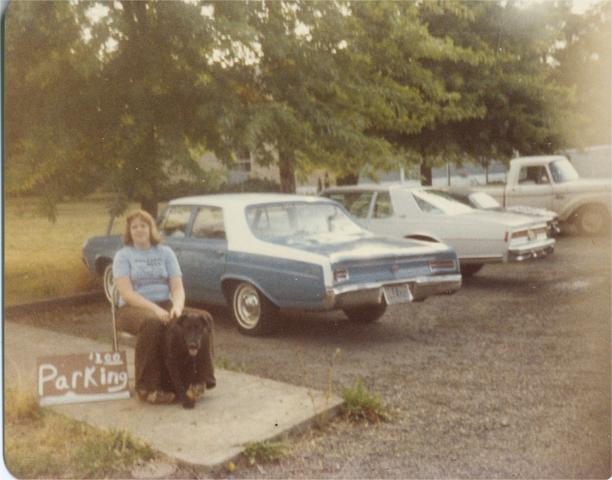

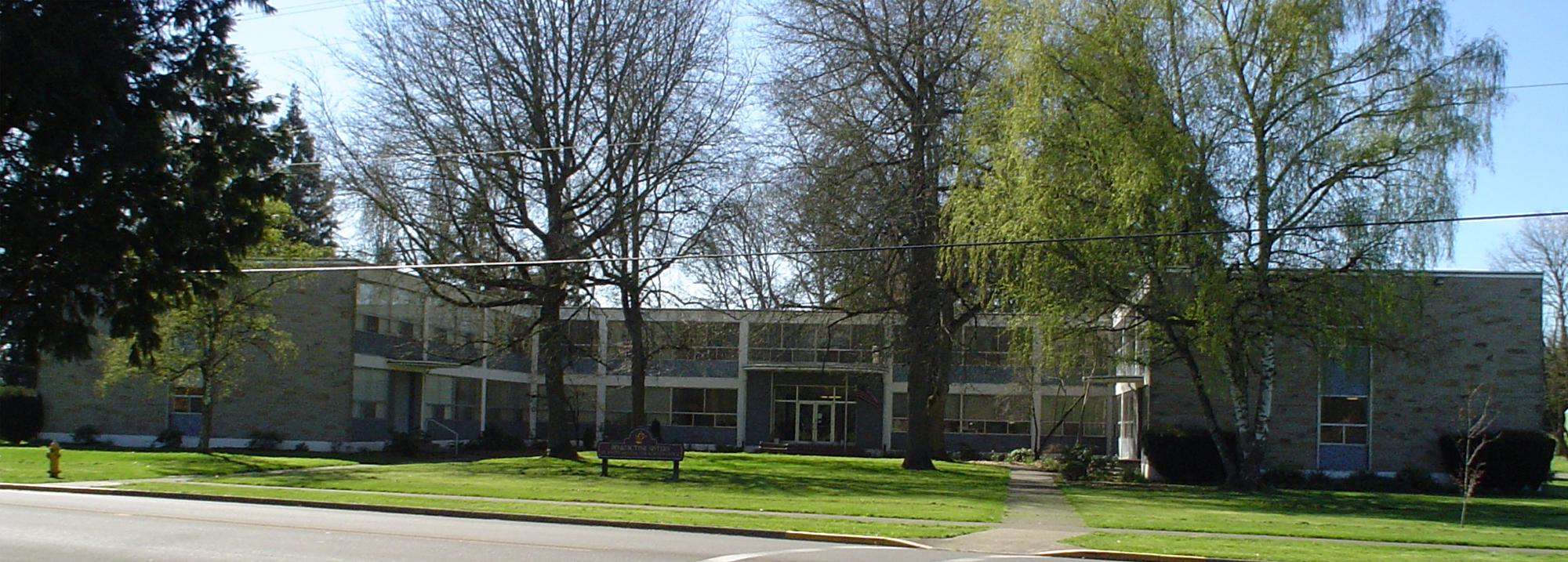

== See also ==
- Cesar Chavez Boulevard
- List of places named after Cesar Chavez
