= Colegio Cesar Chavez, 1973–1983 (book) =

Book by Carlos Maldonado

Title page of Maldonado's book.

Colegio Cesar Chavez, 1973–1983: A Chicano Struggle for Educational Self-Determination (ISBN 0-815336-31-4), written by Carlos Maldonado, is the only book-length study of Colegio Cesar Chavez. Maldonado was professor of Chicano Education Program at Eastern Washington University.

This work began as Maldonado's doctoral dissertation called "The Longest Running Death in History" which was written at University of Oregon . The dissertation was later expanded into the full-length book published by Garland Publishers in 2000. In this work Maldonado claims that due to its geographical location in the Pacific Northwest and the time of its founding, Colegio Cesar Chavez occupies a unique niche in the history of the Chicano Movement. Maldonado writes that the Mexican American community in Oregon and all of the Pacific Northwest is small in comparison to that of other states in the Western United States, making the small farming community of Mount Angel, Oregon an unlikely place for a Chicano institution. Additionally, Maldonado writes that Colegio Cesar Chavez was one of the few educational organizations named after Cesar Chavez during his lifetime. During its decade-long existence Colegio Cesar Chavez was the only fully accredited and independent Chicano and Latino college in the United States.

== See also ==
- Cesar Chavez
- United Farm Workers
