= PCUN =

Hispanic-American labor union in Oregon, United States

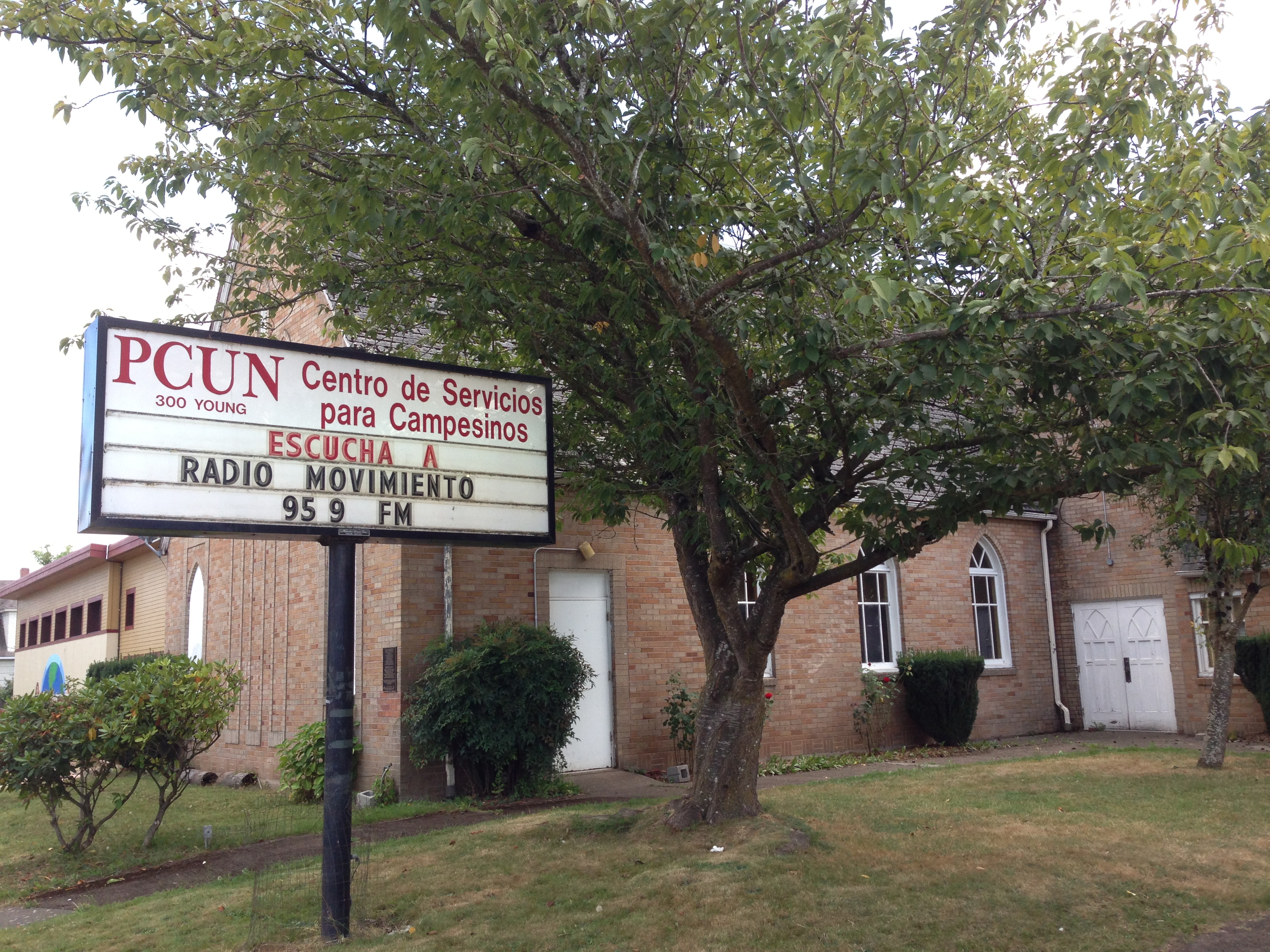
PCUN headquarters in Woodburn, Oregon

Pineros y Campesinos Unidos del Noroeste (in English, Northwest Treeplanters and Farmworkers United), more commonly known by the acronym PCUN, is the largest Latino union in the U.S. state of Oregon. PCUN is located in Woodburn. According to the Statesman Journal, the meetings that led to the formation of PCUN were held at Colegio Cesar Chavez, the nation's first fully accredited and independent Latino college. PCUN was founded in 1977 by Cipriano Ferrel, who graduated from Colegio Cesar Chavez and worked closely with Cesar Chavez himself. Ferrel was motivated to create the organization after an increase in immigration raids in Oregon. PCUN has organized the creation of migrant housing and farmworker housing. Cipriano Ferrel worked closely with Cesar Chavez.

== History ==
=== Founding of the PCUN ===
Cipriano Ferrel was born to farmworkers in Delano, California in 1949. Ferrel attended school with Cesar Chavez's daughters and was known to have an early activist spirit. While in high school, Ferrel joined the Chicano Movement by founding a chapter of the Brown Berets. He also helped start a community periodical called La Fuerza and was a counselor for young men who faced the draft during the Vietnam War. Ferrel joined the United Farm Workers (UFW) after high school and was involved in the Grape Boycott campaigns with Chavez. In 1975, Ferrel moved to Eugene, Oregon to study at the University of Oregon but, shortly after enrolling, he transferred to Colegio Cesar Chavez in Mount Angel the first accredited, independent four-year Chicano/Latino college in the United States. Ferrel received his bachelor's degree in 1977, the same year he co-founded the Willamette Valley Immigration Project (WVIP) with Larry Kleinman in response to an increase in raids in Oregon by the Immigration and Naturalization Service (INS). WVIP was the precursor to the PCUN and focused on providing legal representation and consulting to undocumented farmworkers, particularly with regard to deportation.

The WVIP combated the INS through a legal strategy to slow down deportations. Between 1984 and 1985, WVIP’s staff, reforestation workers, and farmworkers had meetings to discuss strategies in Colegio Cesar Chavez, and on September 15, 1985, WVIP agreed upon the formation of a new labor union. Thus, the Piñeros y Campesinos Unidos del Noroeste, or PCUN, was formed with 80 initial members. The WVIP was subsequently terminated but PCUN created "Centro de Servicios para Campesinos" (Service Center for Farmworkers), to provide immigration services.

=== 1980s ===
The Immigration Reform and Control Act of 1986 allowed undocumented immigrants to apply for residency under certain conditions. The PCUN helped 1,300 immigrants apply for residency under this Act and 98% of the immigrants were approved by the INS. In 1988, PCUN worked on the "Project to Stop Pesticide Poisoning". This project focused on educating farmworkers of the dangers of pesticides, offered them resources, documented farmworker exposures to various pesticides on different farms in Oregon. PCUN also focused on improving farmworker conditions and wages this year under the leadership of Cipriano Ferrel (president), Ramon Ramirez (vice president), and Larry Kleinman (secretary-treasurer). In September 1989, PCUN partnered with Oregon's AFL–CIO and filed a lawsuit against Governor Goldschmidt's "Stranger's Picketing Law", which resulted in its ruling as unconstitutional, a victory for the union. It is during this time that PCUN also moved its headquarters to a former church home. On June 9, a strike fund was announced at a joint conference with PCUN, the Oregon Public Employees Union (OPEU/SEIU), and Clergy and Laity Concerned.

=== 1990s ===
In 1990, the PCUN started its minimum wage campaign, or "Red Card" campaign after the discovery that cucumber and berry farmworkers were losing an estimated $2,000,000 due to minimum wage violations after Oregon raised its minimum wage the year before. PCUN instructed the workers to keep track of their hours and earnings on red cards and were able to collect $155,538 in back wages. The first farmworker strike in Oregon was organized by PCUN and workers at Kraemer Farms who demanded pay raises in 1991. On September 13, 1992, after Kraemer failed to meet the demands of the strikers, PCUN called for a nationwide boycott on a co-owner of Kraemer Farms, NORPAC Foods, Inc. to pressure Kraemer. By March 1993, the boycott had been endorsed by 23 organizations, including the UFW. In 1994, Kraemer raised the wages for workers and the Oregon Department of Agriculture (ODA) fined Kraemer for covering the scales used to weigh harvested fruit. In 1995, PCUN targeted the strawberry harvest in its Tenth Anniversary Organizing Campaign to raise wages for strawberry workers. They managed to increase the wage per pound of harvest through a series of strikes and organizing. That year also saw an effort to focus on the demands and issues faced by the women in farmworker communities. Thus, the Farmworker Women's Leadership Project was created to give these women a safe space to talk among themselves, learn public speaking skills, learn other practical skills such as driving and project planning, and set up a co-op for them to sell handcrafted goods. In 1988, Nature's Fountain Farm and PCUN established a contract that included novel protections for farmworkers such as overtime pay and seniority. In 1999, the NORPAC boycott was prominent in college campuses nationwide and resulted in Gardenburger's separation from the corporation.
