= Altic/Howard Hughes station =

Altic/Howard Hughes
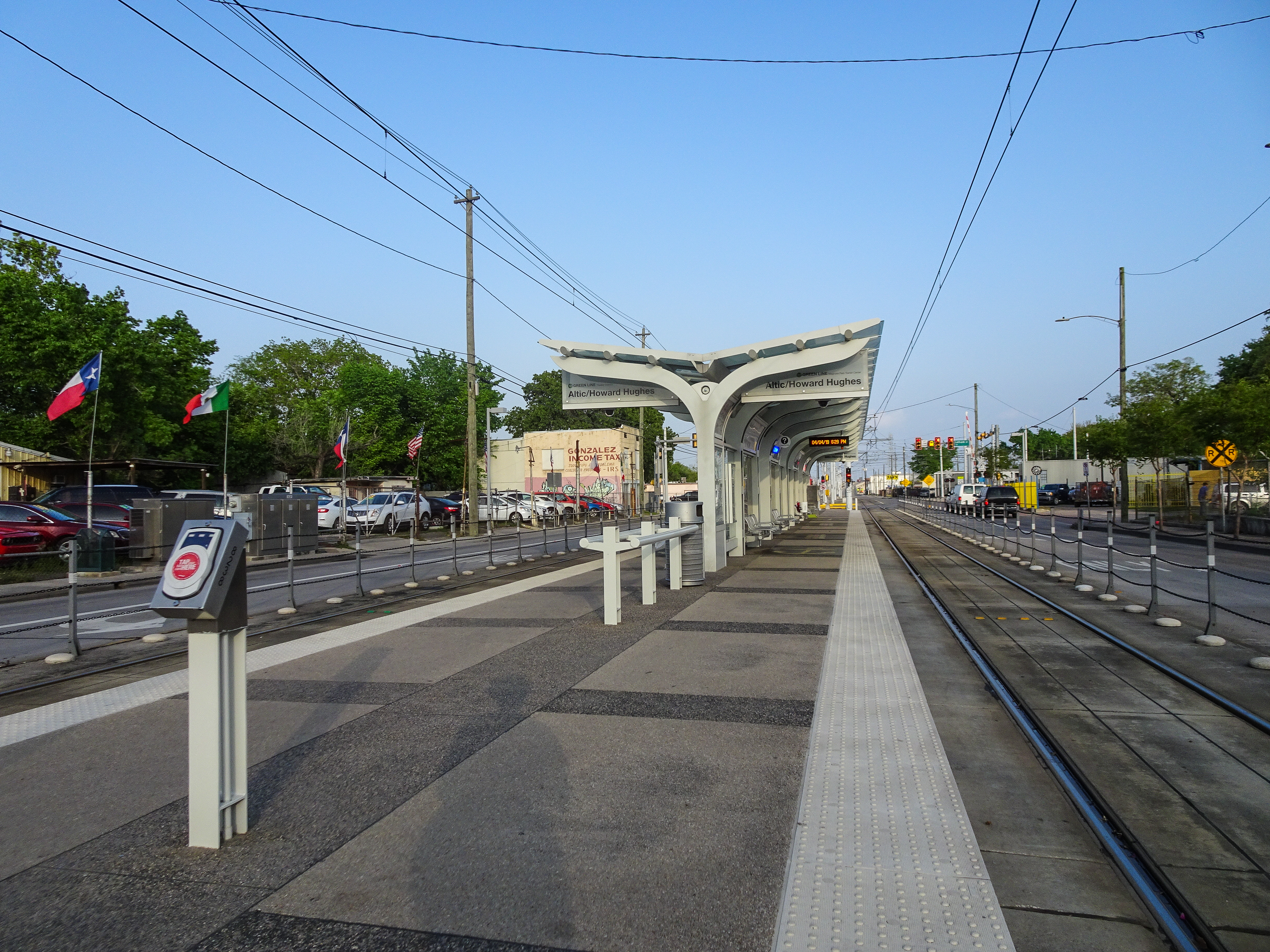
- Station platform, March 2019

General information
- Location: Harrisburg Blvd and Altic Street; Houston, Texas
- Coordinates: 29°44′28″N 95°19′13″W
- Owner: METRO
- Line: Green Line
- Platforms: 1 island platform
- Tracks: 2

Construction
- Structure type: Surface
- Accessible: yes

History
- Opened: May 23, 2015

Services
Preceding station	METRORail	Following station
Lockwood/Eastwood toward Theater District	Green Line	MSG Joe E. Ramirez toward Magnolia Park Transit Center
Location

Altic/Howard Hughes is a light rail station in Houston, Texas, on the METRORail system. It is served by the Green Line and is located on Harrisburg Boulevard at Altic Street in the East End. The station is named for Altic Street as well as Howard Hughes, who built a Hughes Tool Company factory in the area.

Altic/Howard Hughes station opened on May 23, 2015, as part of the Green Line's first phase, serving as its eastern terminus. An extension opened on January 11, 2017, moving the terminus to Magnolia Park Transit Center.
