= Fresno Adult School =

Public school in California, United States

Coordinates: 36.74222°N 119.789444°W

Information
- Former name: Fresno Tech
- School district: Fresno Unified School District
- Website: www.fas.edu

Fresno Adult School, formerly Fresno Tech, is a public school located at the Cesar E. Chavez Adult Education Center operated by the Fresno Unified School District (FUSD) in Fresno, California. The school was constructed on the site of the first public junior college in California.
