= MSG Joe E. Ramirez station =

Light rail station in Houston, Texas

MSG Joe E. Ramirez

General information
- Location: Eastbound: 6717 Harrisburg Blvd. Westbound: 6630 Harrisburg Blvd. Houston, Texas
- Coordinates: 29°44′15.1″N 95°18′29.8″W
- Owner: Metropolitan Transit Authority of Harris County
- Line: Green Line
- Platforms: 2 side platforms
- Tracks: 2

Construction
- Structure type: At-grade
- Accessible: yes

History
- Opened: January 11, 2017

Passengers
- May 2025: 307 (avg. weekday)

Services
Preceding station	METRORail	Following station
Altic/Howard Hughes toward Theater District	Green Line	Magnolia Park Transit Center Terminus
Location

MSG Joe E. Ramirez is a METRORail light rail station in the East End district of Houston, Texas. The station is served by the Green Line and is located in the median of Harrisburg Boulevard at South MSG Joe E. Ramirez Boulevard (formerly 67th Street).

As of May 2025, MSG Joe E. Ramirez has the lowest weekend ridership of all Green Line stations, with an average of 248 riders on Saturdays and 236 riders on Sundays.

MSG Joe E. Ramirez station opened as Cesar Chavez/67th Street on January 11, 2017 as part of the Green Line's second phase, which extended the line from Altic/Howard Hughes station to Magnolia Park Transit Center.

On June 26, 2026, METRO officially renamed Cesar Chavez/67th Street station to MSG Joe E. Ramirez station after the Houston City Council officially renamed Cesar Chavez Boulevard to MSG Joe E. Ramirez Boulevard after sexual abuse allegations were made against Cesar Chavez.
