= Campesinos Boulevard =

Street in Portland, Oregon, United States

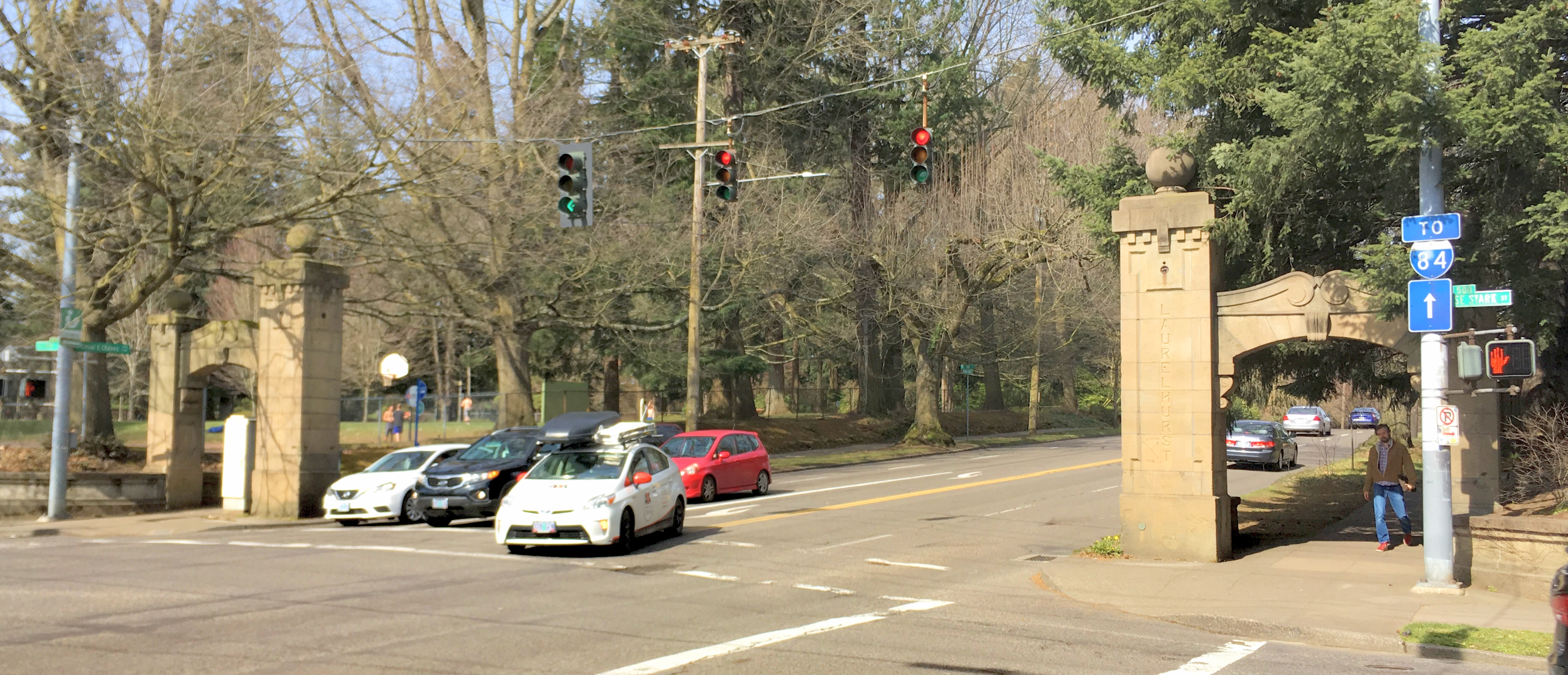
- Former names: 39th Avenue, César E. Chávez Boulevard
- Location: Portland, Oregon

Campesinos Boulevard is a street in Portland, Oregon, United States. Prior to 2009, it was known as Northeast and Southeast 39th Avenue, and until 2026 it was known as César E. Chávez Boulevard.

== History ==
In July 2009, the Portland City Council approved renaming all segments of 39th Avenue within the city limits as César E. Chávez Blvd in honor of Latino labor activist Cesar E. Chavez. Originally planned for December 2009, the first street sign with the new name was installed on January 29, 2010. The street bore signage of both the new name and the former name for five years.

The renaming process was very acrimonious. There had been a false start in earlier years with a prior street selection. Other streets nominated for selection included Fourth Avenue and Interstate Avenue. Opponents of any initiative to rename a street for the labor leader cited his overall lack of significant links to the Portland area. Supporters of the renaming initiative countered that Cesar Chavez had a presence in Oregon, with Colegio Cesar Chavez as one example. NE and SE 39th Avenues were finally selected, being an important through-way, but carrying an existing name which lacked toponymic significance to the history of Portland. (The number 39 was sequential and not historically significant.) Latinos are the largest growing ethnic group in Portland, Oregon, and yet prior to the naming of César E. Chávez Boulevard no public location had been named after a Latino.

In 2026, allegations that César Chávez had committed sexual abuse against teenage girls were reported by the New York Times. In the wake of these allegations, some city leaders began calling for the street's name to be changed. Portland City Council member Candace Avalos stated on social media that she had begun the process of exploring renaming the street to honor Latina labor leader Dolores Huerta. In September of 2026 Portland City Council voted unanimously to rename the street to "Campesinos Boulevard" to recognize the contributions of Latino farm workers. The city chose to fast-track the renaming process, waiving the requirement that old street signs remain visible alongside the new ones for five years after the name change.

== Transit ==
The street is served by TriMet bus line 75 and at one time was also served by then since-discontinued lines 66 and 74.

== See also ==
- Hispanics and Latinos in Portland, Oregon
- List of streets in Portland, Oregon
