= Morningside Place, Houston =

Group of subdivisions in Houston, Texas

Morningside Place is a group of subdivisions located in Houston, Texas, United States.

The subdivision is not to be confused with Morningside Place, a development in southern unincorporated Harris County, Texas outside Beltway 8 which uses "Houston" addresses.

== History ==
The subdivision began in September 1999 when the Bliss Court, Brantwood, Carolina Place, Wessex, and Windermere subdivisions joined into one organizational entity.

== Cityscape ==
The community, located east of Kirby Drive, is located between Southgate and the City of West University Place. It is in proximity to the Texas Medical Center, Rice University, and Rice Village. The constituent communities are Bliss Court, Brantwood, Carolina Place, Condon Oaks, Hamlet T/H Condo, McClendon/Pinnacle, Royal Oaks at Kirby, Village T/H Condo, Wessex, and Windermere.

== Government and infrastructure ==
The Morningside Place Civic Association governs Morningside Place.

Morningside Place is a part of the University Place Super Neighborhood Council.

It is within Houston City Council District C.

Houston Fire Department Fire Station 37 Braes Heights is located at 3828 Aberdeen Way. Houston Fire Department Station 33 Medical Center is near the Texas Medical Center at 7100 Fannin @ South Braeswood .

The neighborhood is within the Houston Police Department's South Central Patrol Division .

Morningside Place is in Texas's 7th congressional district.

Harris Health System (formerly Harris County Hospital District) designated Martin Luther King Health Center in southeast Houston for ZIP code 77030. The nearest public hospital is Ben Taub General Hospital in the Texas Medical Center.

== Education ==
=== Public schools ===
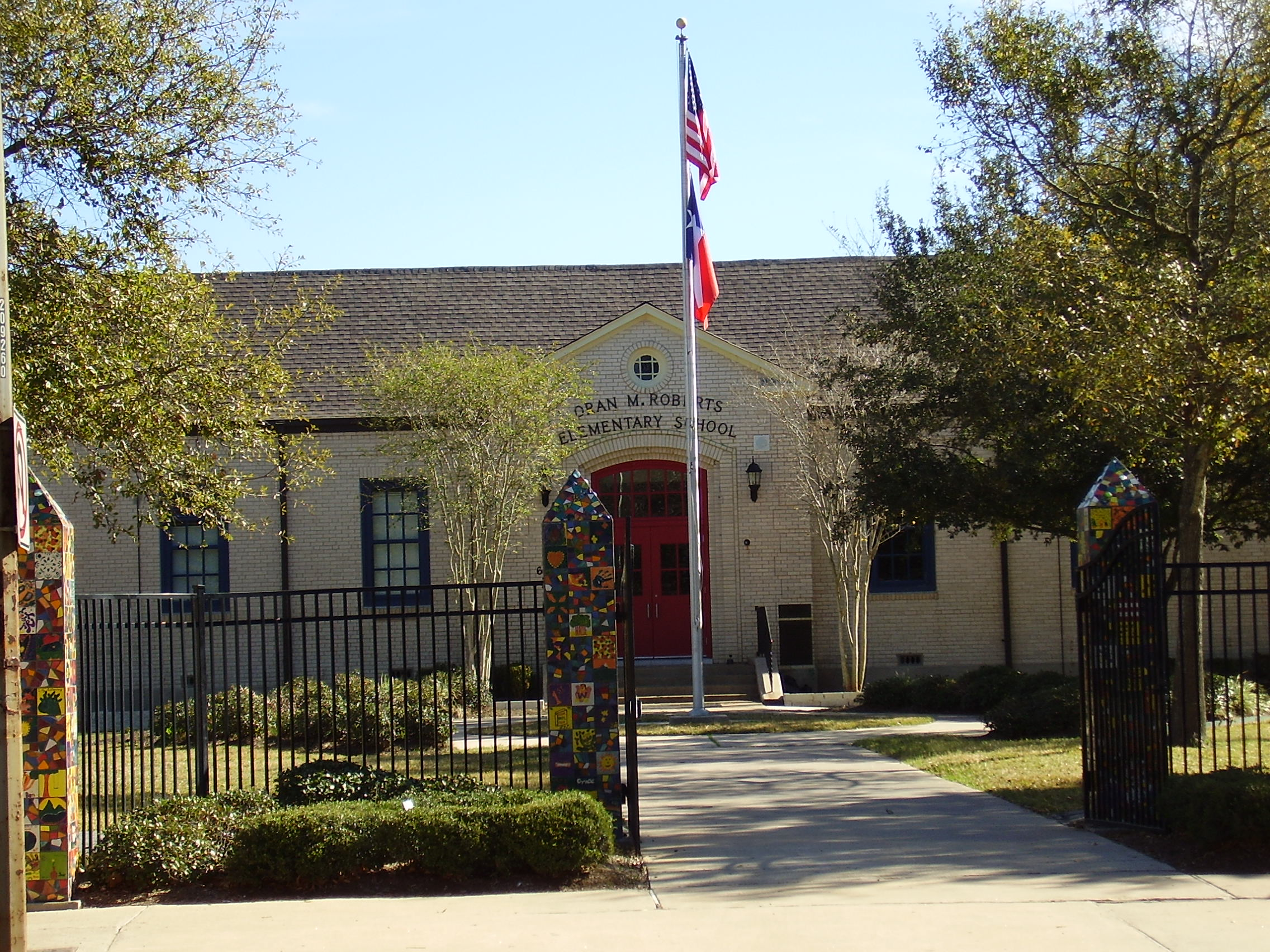
Roberts Elementary School

Residents are zoned to Houston Independent School District schools.

- Roberts Elementary School
- Pershing Middle School with Pin Oak Middle School as an option
- Lamar High School

In 1999 Katherine Feser of the Houston Chronicle said that the zoning to Roberts was one of the "selling points" of the Windermere community.

=== Private schools ===
St. Vincent de Paul School, a K-8 Roman Catholic school operated by the Roman Catholic Archdiocese of Galveston-Houston, is in the area.

St. Nicholas School Medical Center Campus, a K-8 private school, is in the area.

Saint Anne Catholic School, a K-8 Roman Catholic school operated by the Roman Catholic Archdiocese of Galveston-Houston is in the area.

=== Public libraries ===
The McGovern-Stella Link Branch of the Houston Public Library is near the neighborhood.

== Media ==
The Houston Chronicle is the area regional newspaper.

The West University Examiner is a local newspaper distributed in the community.

The Village News and Southwest News is a local newspaper distributed in the community.

== Community information ==
The Weekley Family YMCA is located near Morningside Place.

== See also ==
- Old Braeswood, Houston
- Southgate, Houston
