= Old Braeswood, Houston =

Neighborhood in Texas, United States

Coordinates: 29.702°N 95.413°W

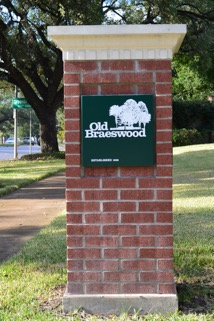
An entrance to Old Braeswood.

Old Braeswood is a neighborhood of single family homes in Houston, Texas, United States. It is generally bounded by South Main, North Braeswood, Kirby Drive, and Holcombe. The Texas Medical Center, Rice University, Rice Village, and the NRG Center complex are all within a one-mile radius. Nearby neighborhoods include Southgate, West University Place and Braeswood Place.

Established as “Braeswood” by Braeswood Corporation in 1928 and renamed “Old Braeswood” in 1982, the neighborhood exhibits architectural styles from two distinctively different periods. The neighborhood is composed of three sections. In Section 1 and the southernmost streets of Braeswood Addition, the houses were built primarily in the late 1920s and the 1930s. In Braeswood Extension, the houses were built primarily in the 1950s. The three northernmost streets in Braeswood Addition were also built in the 1950s. This diversity and quality of the architecture prompted the National Trust for Historic Preservation to select Old Braeswood for its annual Candlelight Tour organized in conjunction with Houston Mod during its 2016 national convention held in Houston, Texas.

Old Braeswood is distinguished not only by its architecture, but also by residents such as those described below under "Notable former residents."

In 2016, the median house cost was $1,255,000.

== History ==
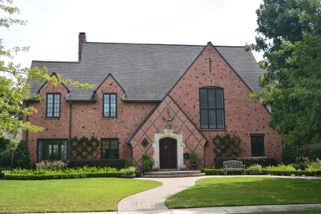
This 1935 Tudor house is at 2341 Blue Bonnet Blvd.

Old Braeswood was under way by 1927 with the sale of 456 acres to Braeswood Corporation by John J. Kirby. The intent of Braeswood Corporation was to create a garden suburb of country houses along South Main Street, with deed restrictions to protect the integrity of the neighborhood. The plan of the neighborhood was designed by Hare and Hare, the Kansas City landscape architects responsible for many garden suburbs across the country. Braeswood Corporation retained local architects to design houses, primarily in the English manorial style, selling the first house to Braeswood Corporation board member and former Texas Governor William Hobby in 1929.

Ensuing development continued the vision of Braeswood Corporation. The City of Houston annexed Braeswood in 1937 and the name changed to "Old Braeswood" in 1982 to differentiate the neighborhood from nearby neighborhoods that were also named after the Brays Bayou, and to affirm the regard the residents held for the history of the neighborhood.

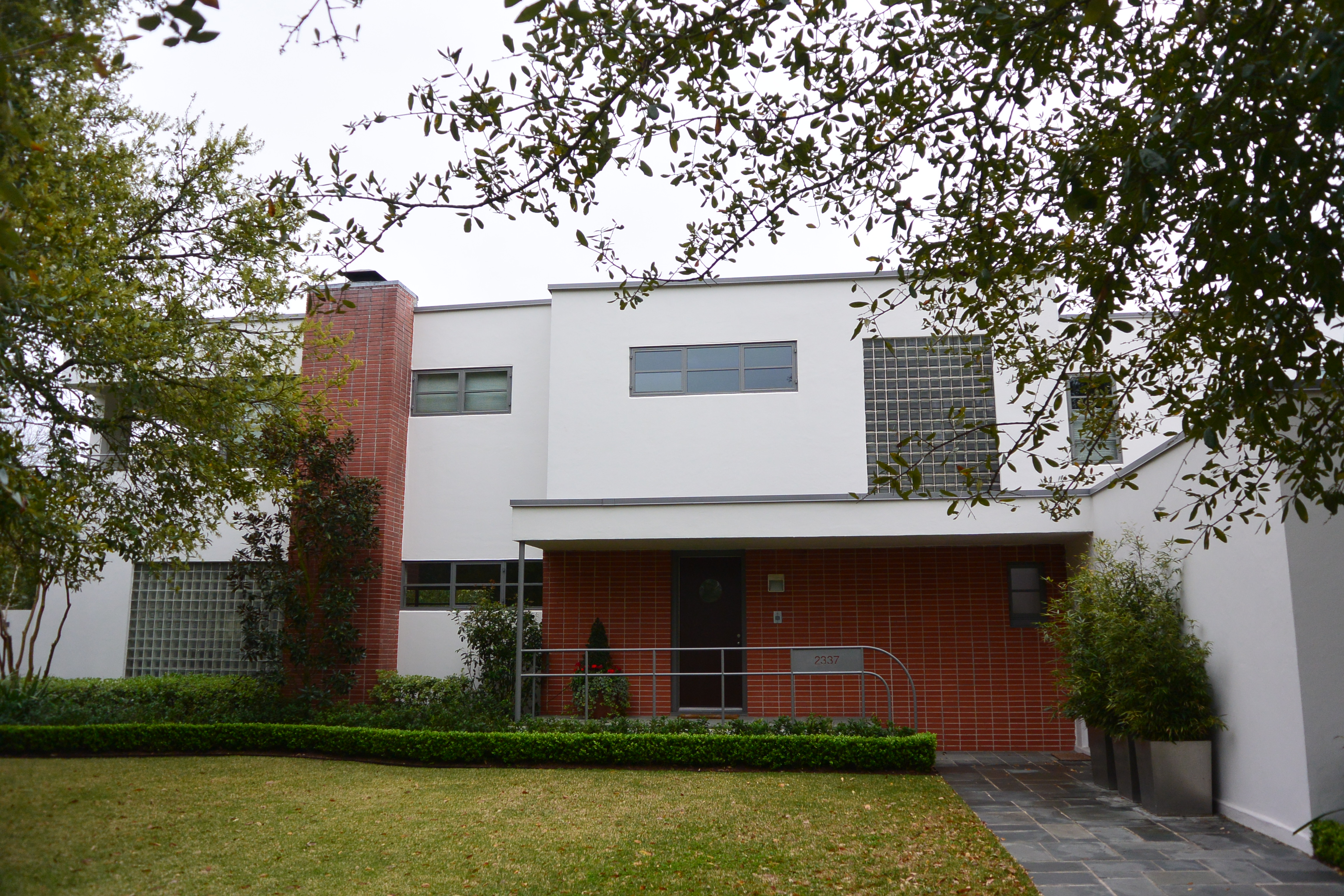
Architects Wirtz & Calhoun designed this modern home at 2337 Blue Bonnet Blvd. in 1937.

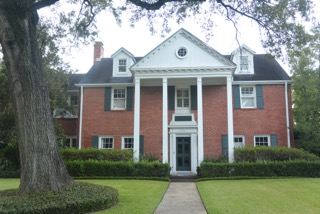
This Colonial Revival house was built in 1938 at 2351 Blue Bonnet Blvd.

The early development of Braeswood occurred simultaneously with, and parallel to, that of two other Houston neighborhoods, River Oaks and Riverside Terrace. The three shared some of the same architects and architectural styles.

Architects who shaped Old Braeswood's initial development, through the 1930s, included Harry D. Payne, Carl A. Mulvey, Cameron D. Fairchild, Charles S. Chase, Joseph Finger, Joseph W. Northrop, Jr., Hollis E. Parker, Eugene Werlin, Tom E. Lightfoot, Irving R. Klein, Maurice J. Sullivan, Lenard Gabert, Wirtz and Calhoun, Sam H. Dixon, Jr., A. B. Ellis, James I. Campbell, Theo G. Keller, Bailey A. Swenson, Harvin C. Moore, Herman Lloyd, Claude E. Hooton, and William Fred Gray.

Development in Old Braeswood in 1940 and 1941 made use of some architects new to the neighborhood including Wolf and Hoyt, Otto F. Woestemeyer, Theo G. Keller, G. Ancira, Irving R. Klein, Dixon and Greenwood, and Ben F. Greenwood. Then, legal restrictions on non-essential construction during World War II brought a temporary halt to development.

In the 1950s there was again a burst of development, primarily in Braeswood Extension and primarily with architect-designed interpretations of the midcentury ranch house. Architects from that era, in addition to earlier Old Braeswood architects, included Paul Lázló, Preston M. Bolton, Joseph Krakower, Howard Barnstone, Koetter and Tharp, Anthony Cannata, and Eugene Werlin.

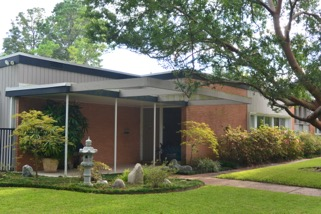
Architect Paul László, assisted by Howard Barnstone, designed this Midcentury Modern house at 2523 Maroneal Blvd.

Among the neighborhood's most widely celebrated examples of architecture are the Allen House (2337 Blue Bonnet Blvd.) designed by Wirtz and Calhoun in the Bauhaus tradition, the Gordon House (2307 Blue Bonnet Blvd.) by Bolton and Barnstone in 1955 in the International style, and the Herzog House (2523 Maroneal Blvd.) by Paul László in 1952 in the Midcentury Modern style.

Old Braeswood was the focus of a home tour sponsored by Rice Design Alliance in 1986. Cite Magazine published an article about the tour in its Winter 1986 issue.

An architectural history prepared by the Anchorage Foundation of Texas for the Old Braeswood Civic Club stated in 1988: “From Mulvey, Wirtz and Calhoun, Brochstein, László and Bolton and Barnstone to the architects of the 1980s, Braeswood has continued to be a place where architecturally important houses are built in Houston. As long as this tradition is maintained, the historic standing and distinction of Braeswood will be assured.”

== Notable former residents ==
- LaVerl Jean Daly (1930-2017), recipient of the Order of the Rising Sun (2007) conferred in the name of the emperor of Japan for her mastery and promotion of the Ikebana art of flower arranging and designee of Houston's Woman of the Year (1980) award.
- William P. Hobby (1878-1964), governor of the State of Texas, 1917–21, editor and publisher of the Houston Post-Dispatch, and director of Braeswood Corporation
- Oveta Culp Hobby (1905-1995), first U.S. Secretary of Health, Education, and Welfare; organized and headed the Federal Security Agency; first director of the Women's Army Corps; publisher and board chair of the Houston Post; first woman to receive the U.S. Army's Distinguished Service Medal
- William P. Hobby, Jr. (1932 -), lieutenant governor of the State of Texas, 1973-91
- Ray Brochstein (1932 -), a Houston developer of the Galleria area, former trustee of Rice University
- Meyer Morris Gordon (1988-1961), founder of Gordon's Jewelers, the first jewelry store company listed on the New York Stock Exchange and at one time the second largest retail jewelry chain in the world
- William Howard Lee (1908-1981), heir to a Spindletop oil fortune who married movie stars Hedy Lamarr and Gene Tierney
- Glenn H. McCarthy (1907-1988), known as “Diamond Glenn,” legendary wildcatter who married a daughter of Spindletop's William Ellsworth Lee, built the Shamrock Hotel, and inspired the character of Jett Rink in Edna Ferber's novel Giant. Jett Rink was portrayed by James Dean in the movie version
- Walter Henry “Mad Dog” Mengden, Jr. (1926 -), colorful Texas state representative 1971-72; Texas state senator 1973-83; president pro-tem of Texas State Senate (1981)
- Charles O’Brien (1884-1952), co-founder of Houston Pilots (the association of pilots on the Houston ship channel) in 1921, and for that reason honored in 2001 by a joint resolution of the Texas House and Texas Senate
- Gwendolyn Pappas, 1963 Texas Poet Laureate, 1962 Texas Mother of the Year, 1961 Houston Outstanding Homemaker
- Rabbi Hyman Schachtel (1907-1990), Senior Rabbi of Congregation Beth Israel; columnist for the Houston Post and author of numerous books; professor at University of Houston and University of St. Thomas; Rabbi delivering the inaugural prayer for President Lyndon B. Johnson in Washington D.C. in 1965
- Irvin M. Schlenker, president of Gulftex Drug Co.; board chairman of Houston National Bank, president of Congregation Beth Israel, the oldest Jewish Reform synagogue in Texas. It founded Schlenker School in 1982, the first Jewish Reform day school in Texas.

== Neighborhood Involvement ==
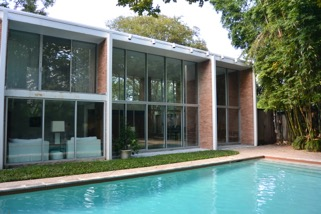
At 2307 Blue Bonnet Blvd., this 1955 house was designed by Howard Barnstone and Preston M. Bolton in a style inspired by Mies van der Rohe.

Old Braeswood property owners are members of the Old Braeswood Property Owners Association (OBPOA), also known as Old Braeswood Civic Club, which meets twice annually to exchange information and elect officers to the OBPOA Board. The Board and its committees enforce deed restrictions, maintain the parks, coordinate with Trees for Houston for the planting of trees, produce a directory of residents, produce a newsletter, contract for a private security patrol, welcome new residents, encourage historic preservation, raise funds for neighborhood projects and sponsor social events including family-oriented parties in the neighborhood park and open to the public.

OBPOA is a member of the University Place Super Neighborhood Council (SN#28) and the University Place Association. It maintains liaisons with Houston City Council, Houston Parks Department and the Public Works and Engineering Department, the Brays Bayou Association, Trees for Houston, and Preservation Houston. In 1988 the association published a book about the architectural history of the neighborhood.

The Old Braeswood Garden Club, founded in 1939 and one of the oldest garden clubs in Houston, meets monthly and is open to residents of Old Braeswood. The Old Braeswood Book Club, founded in 2014, also meets monthly and is open to Old Braeswood residents.

== Government and infrastructure ==
Old Braeswood is a part of the University Place Super Neighborhood Council. It is within Houston City Council District C. Old Braeswood is in Texas's 7th congressional district.

Houston Fire Department Fire Station 37 Braes Heights is located at 3828 Aberdeen Way. Houston Fire Department Station 33 Medical Center is near the Texas Medical Center. The neighborhood is within the Houston Police Department's South Central Patrol Division. The neighborhood is also patrolled by a private company and by the Harris County Pct 1 Constable.

Harris Health System (formerly Harris County Hospital District) designated Martin Luther King Health Center in southeast Houston for ZIP code 77030. The nearest public hospital is Ben Taub General Hospital in the Texas Medical Center.

== Education ==
=== Area schools ===
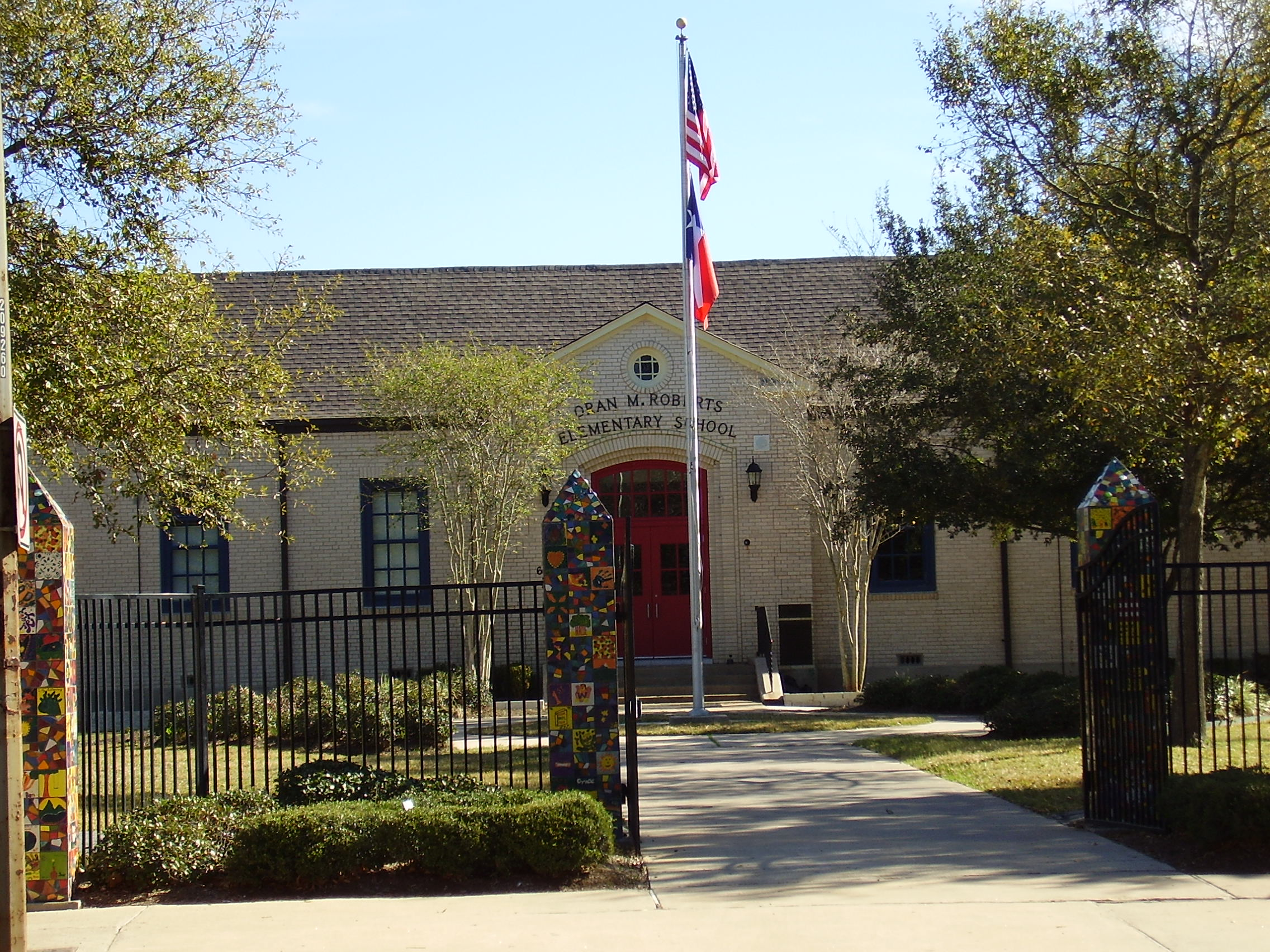
Roberts Elementary School

The neighborhood is zoned to Houston Independent School District schools. The zoned public schools for Old Braeswood include Roberts Elementary School, Pershing Middle School (a fine arts Magnet School), and Lamar High School. Students assigned to Pershing may also apply to the regular program of Pin Oak Middle School, a foreign language magnet school, in Bellaire.

Debakey High School for Health Professions, a medical magnet school, is also nearby in the Texas Medical Center.

Roberts Elementary opened in 1936. An addition was installed in 1948.

There are a number of private schools in close proximity to Old Braeswood, including St. Vincent de Paul Catholic School, a K-8 school of the Roman Catholic Archdiocese of Galveston-Houston. Rice University is only a mile away.

=== Libraries ===
The Houston Public Library McGovern-Stella Link Neighborhood Libraryand the Harris County Public Library West University Branch are near Old Braeswood.

== Parks ==
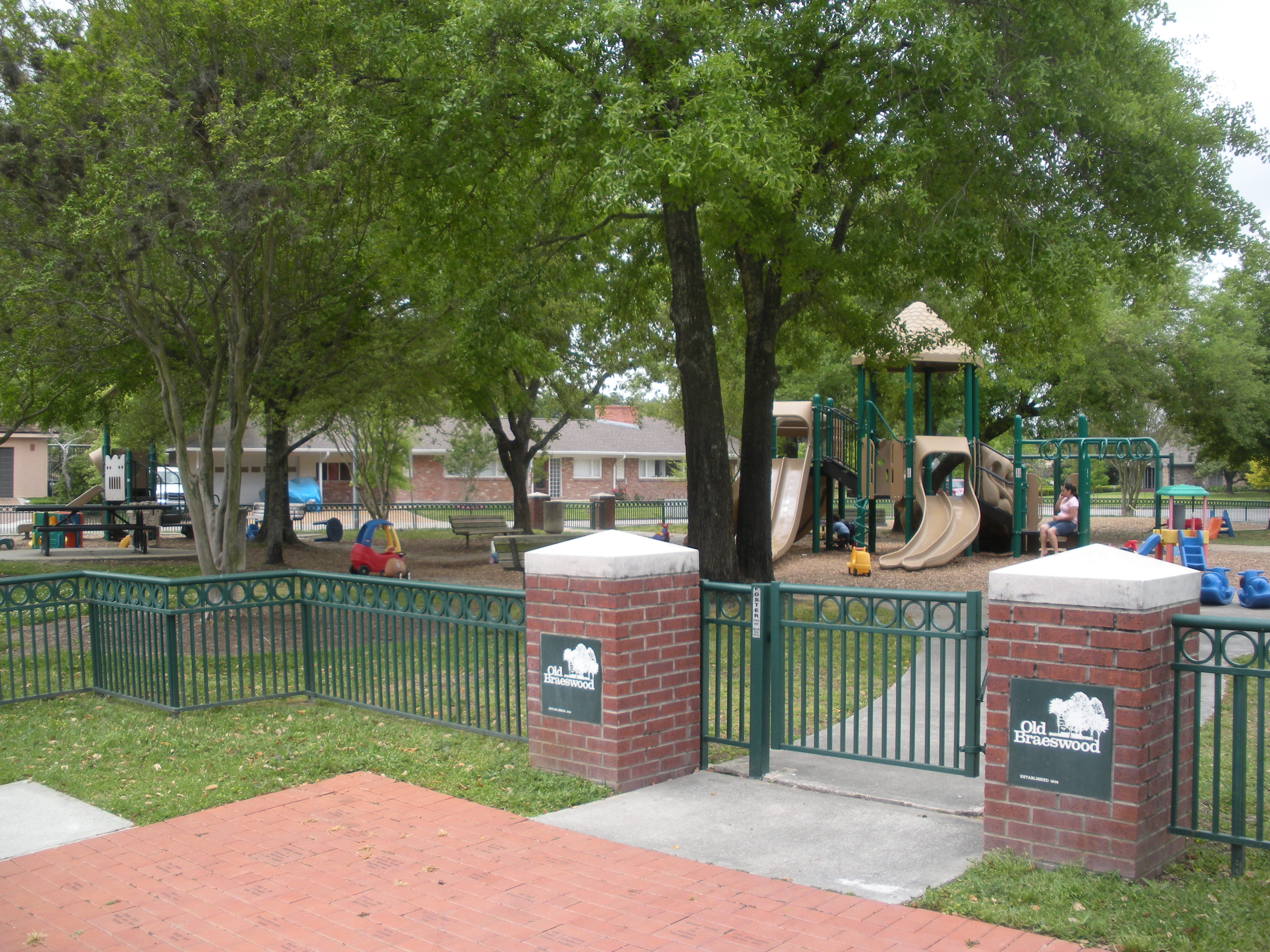
Old Braeswood Park at Morningside and Maroneal Blvd.

Braeswood Park, a City of Houston park, is located in Old Braeswood. The Old Braeswood Park Corporation, a 501c(3) corporation, raises funds for maintenance and improvements to the park. The Park Corporation also maintains esplanades within Old Braeswood.

Bayou Greenways, with a bicycle and walking path along Braes Bayou, is immediately adjacent to the neighborhood. Hermann Park is only a mile away.

== Media ==
The Houston Chronicle is the area regional newspaper.

The West University Examiner is a local newspaper distributed in the community.

The Village News and Southwest News is another local newspaper distributed in the community.

In the mid-20th century the community newspaper Southwestern Times served Old Braeswood and surrounding communities. The paper was headquartered in Rice Village.

== Community information ==
The Weekley Family YMCA is located near Old Braeswood.

== Sources ==
- Braeswood: An Architectural History, Old Braeswood Civic Club and the Anchorage Foundation of Texas, 1988
