= Montclair Place =

Montclair Place may refer to:

- Montclair Place, Houston, a neighborhood of Houston, Texas
- Montclair Place (California), a shopping mall in Montclair, California
