= Southgate, Houston =

Neighborhood in Houston, Texas, United States

Coordinates: 29.710°N 95.410°W

Southgate is a neighborhood in Houston, Texas, United States.

== History ==
In 2002, St. Luke's Episcopal Hospital was engaging in an expansion project. In January 2003, some residents asked the City of Houston to reclassify University Boulevard as a residential street in order to control the amount of traffic on the street. The Southgate Civic Club asked for a street closure on Southgate Boulevard to prevent traffic from the Texas Medical Center from reaching the subdivision. In late December 2003, the City of Houston Public Works Department closed a portion of Southgate Boulevard to block Medical Center traffic. In 2003, on weekdays, 38% of the vehicle traffic on Southgate Boulevard did not originate from the neighborhood. The Houston Fire Department had stated opposition to the street closures. In December 2003, the City of Houston closed Southgate east of Travis Street, preventing commuters to a St. Luke's office building from parking in the neighborhood. Deborah Mann Lake of the Houston Chronicle. said that the closure of Southgate Boulevard did not bring very many complaints.

In 2004, residents considered establishing a property owners association to better prevent developments not desirable to the community from occurring and to more strongly enforce deed restrictions. Some residents believed that a property owners association could gain too much power and cause the community's direction to fall into an undesirable power authority. In 2004, Richard Merrill, the president of the Southgate Civic Club, said that a majority of residents supported the idea of a property owners association. One resident, Michael Bonderer, launched a campaign against the idea of a property owners association and put a sign in his yard. He was banned from the Southgate community message board, which had been established to discuss the property owner issue.

In 2007, Southgate residents and Houston City Council member Anne Clutterbuck worked on a plan to make modify street closures to continue stemming Texas Medical Center traffic.

In 2010, Raj Mankad of the Houston Chronicle said that despite being in the presence of the high-rises of the Texas Medical Center, it "retains a close-nit [sic] community feel.

In April 2010, the City of Houston "automated" curbside recycling program was extended to Southgate.

== Cityscape ==
Southgate is adjacent to Rice University and the Texas Medical Center. It consists of four subdivisions.

Trees line the neighborhood streets. In 2002, Southgate had 573 houses. Many of the houses were built in the 1930s and the 1940s. Unlike surrounding communities like the City of West University Place and Southampton, by 2002 few of the original houses in Southgate had been demolished and replaced with new development. Because there is less variety in the housing styles, the pricing range was more narrow than in other areas. In 2002, the lowest housing prices were a bit below $300,000 ($540,000 in current money) and most of the original two-story houses sold in the $400,000 ($720,000 in current money) range. The small number of newer houses often had prices of over $700,000 ($1,250,000 in current money). In 2002, Feser said that Southgate had similarities to the communities making up Morningside Place. By 2010, the housing stock included several restored 1930s houses and some more recent modern houses. Raj Mankad of the Houston Chronicle said that the housing stock "demonstrates both stability and openness to innovation."

== Demographics ==
In 2005, Allison Cook said "There's just more disposable income in Southampton, Broad Acres [sic] and storied Shadow Lawn than in Southgate".

== Government and infrastructure ==
The Southgate Civic Club operates the community. It includes an architectural review as part of its deed restrictions, described by Raj Mankad of the Houston Chronicle as "strong."

Houston Fire Department Fire Station 37 is located at 3828 Aberdeen Way. Houston Fire Department Station 33 Braes Heights Medical Center is near the Texas Medical Center at 7100 Fannin @ South Braeswood .

It is within Houston City Council District C.

The neighborhood is within the Houston Police Department's South Central Patrol Division . Patrol services are contracted to the Harris County Precinct 1 Constable's Office.

The Rice Area Constable Service patrols the community, charging it $200 yearly. On some streets parking is restricted, because the community is in proximity to the Texas Medical Center.

Southgate is in Texas's 7th congressional district .

Harris Health System (formerly Harris County Hospital District) designated Martin Luther King Health Center in southeast Houston for ZIP code 77030. The nearest public hospital is Ben Taub General Hospital in the Texas Medical Center.

== Education ==
=== Public schools ===
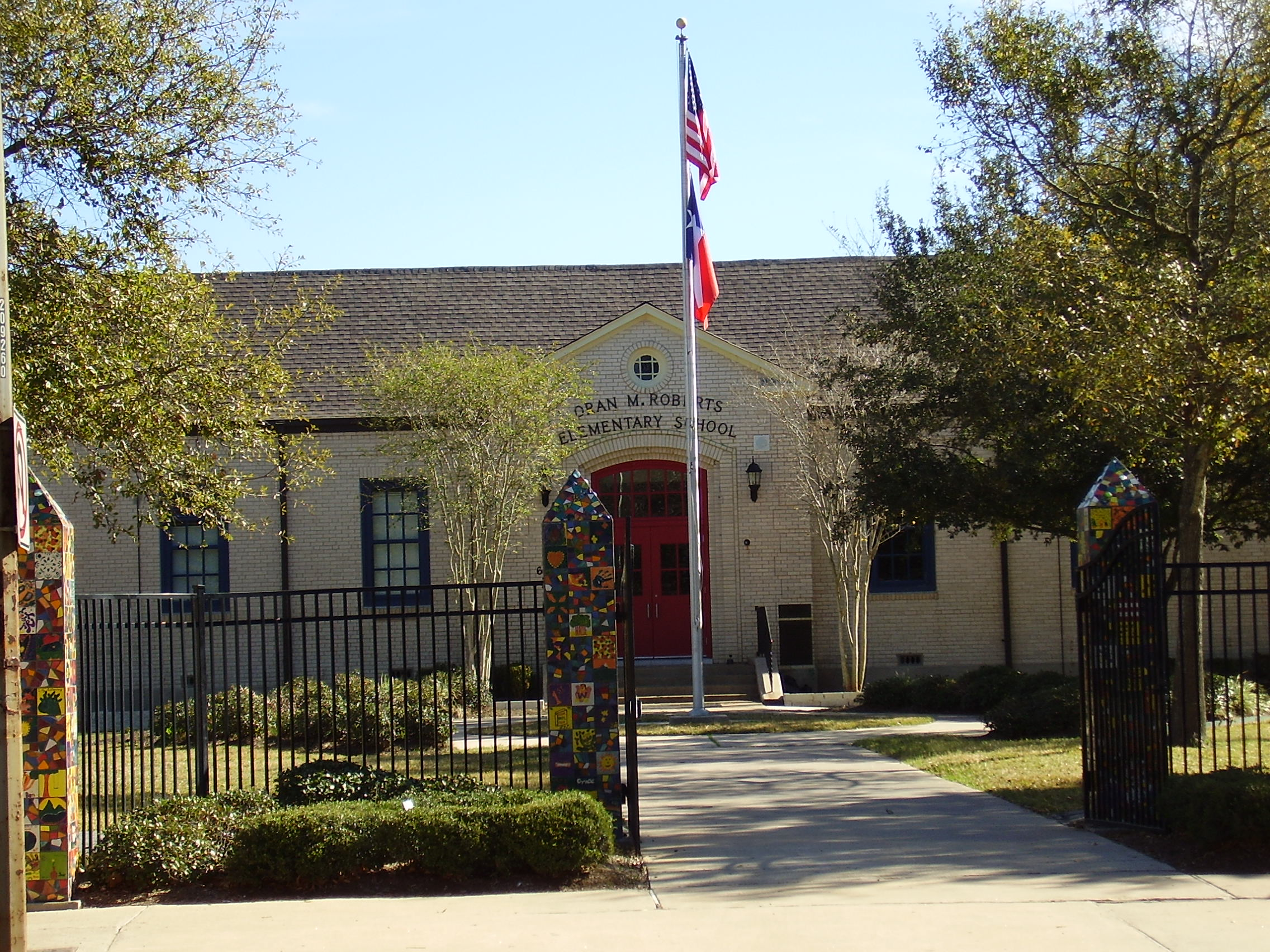
Roberts Elementary School

Roberts Elementary School is located in Southgate. Southgate is zoned to Houston Independent School District schools, including Roberts, Pershing Middle School (located in Braeswood Place - Any student zoned to Pershing may apply to Pin Oak Middle School's regular program), and Lamar High School (Upper Kirby).

Roberts has a magnet program in the fine arts. As of 2002, the school consistently achieves high test scores. During that year, Katherine Feser said that the school was a "draw" for Southgate.

=== Private schools ===
St. Vincent de Paul School, a K-8 Roman Catholic school operated by the Roman Catholic Archdiocese of Galveston-Houston, is in the area.

St. Nicholas School Medical Center Campus, a K-8 private school, is in the area.

=== Public libraries ===
The Houston Public Library Stella Link Branch and the Harris County Public Library West University Branch are near Southgate.

== Community information ==
The Weekley Family YMCA is located near Southgate.

== Media ==
The Houston Chronicle is the area regional newspaper.

The West University Examiner is a local newspaper distributed in the community .

The Village News and Southwest News is a local newspaper distributed in the community.

In the mid-20th century the community newspaper Southwestern Times served Southgate and surrounding communities. The paper was headquartered in Rice Village.

== Notable residents ==
- Brock Wagner (founder and owner of Saint Arnold Brewing Co.)
