= Sunset Terrace/Montclair, Houston =

Inner Loop neighborhoods of Harris County, Texas, United States

Sunset Terrace and Montclair Place are two Inner Loop neighborhoods (neighborhoods within the 610 Loop) of Harris County, Texas, United States. The two subdivisions are served by the Sunset Terrace/Montclair Civic Association.

Much of Sunset Terrace is in West University Place, while the rest of Sunset Terrace and Montclair are in Houston.

== History ==
A cemetery was once located at the intersection of Auden and Drake in what is now Sunset Terrace. In 1956 the Sunset Terrace Garden Club planted oleanders to beautify a ditch formerly belonging to a Harris County poor farm.

It was created in the late 1940s and annexed by the city shortly thereafter.

From January 1990 to October 1991 housing values increased by 21%. In October 1991 the average house price was $102.46 per square foot. A study conducted by the Sage Realty Advisors and the University of Houston Center for Public Policy stated that Sunset Terrace was one of the neighborhoods with the most quickly increasing house prices.

The community is inside the 610 Loop. Together the area that Sunset Terrace and Montclair occupy is bounded by Weslayan Street to the west, Westpark Drive to the north, Edloe Street to the east, and Bissonnet Street to the south. The community is between West University Place and Interstate 69/U.S. Route 59 (Southwest Freeway). It is in proximity to Highland Village, Rice Village, Rice University, and The Galleria.

The community has many mature oak trees. The street names in the community originate from U.S. universities and colleges. The sizes of lots in Sunset Terrace/Montclair are larger than typical properties in West University Place. Several lots are over 10,000 square feet (930 m^{2}) of area. In 1995 Joanne Flynn, a Sunset Terrace resident and a real estate agent with John Daugherty, said "You get a little bit larger lot in Sunset Terrace for the same amount of money. They're deeper than your typical West U. lot." In 2009 Kathleen Dunwoody Graf, a real estate agent with Greenwood King Properties, said that house buyers choose Sunset Terrace mainly due to the central location and large lots.

=== Houses and multifamily complexes ===
As of 2009 Sunset Terrace housing prices ranged from $300,000 ($450209.4 inflation-adjusted) to almost $2 million ($3001396 inflation-adjusted). The lower priced houses include late 1940s and 1950s one story ranch houses, typically each with three bedrooms and two bedrooms. Each older style house, as of 2009, is priced from $300,000 to $600,000 ($900418.8 inflation-adjusted). By 2009 many of the older houses had been demolished, and newly built stone houses and stucco houses, typically priced up to $2 million, had replaced them. The houses often have stucco siding, summer kitchens, outdoor areas, and large entertainment spaces. In 2009 Dunwoody Graf said that there was an increasing trend of house buyers buying older houses for inexpensive amounts and refurbishing them. In 1995, older houses were priced from $130,000 ($274677.88 inflation-adjusted) to $250,000 ($528226.69 inflation-adjusted) and newer houses were priced at $300,000 ($633872.02 inflation-adjusted) and above.

As of 1995 several multifamily complexes are within Sunset Terrace/Montclair. Some apartments are located along Law Street. Some duplexes are located on the edges of the subdivisions.

== Government and infrastructure ==
In 1986 METRO was proposing an Edloe Street station of its "station busway." Paul Bay, the METRO assistant general manager for transit systems development, said that Sunset Terrace/Montclair residents said that they felt concerns about the visual effects of the proposed station and issues with noise and traffic. The station was never built.

In 1995 the civic club was discussing with the City of Houston the possibility of installing speed bumps. The community had experienced a lot of vehicular traffic going to The Galleria and Greenway Plaza.

In 2006, during a controversy of where to place the METRORail University Line, Kristin Lindquist, the chairperson of the subdivision's rail committee, said that the community was opposed to having the light rail line placed on Westpark from Edloe to the Union Pacific railroad. She added that "We've been brushed off because we're not as rich as Afton Oaks," a Houston community opposed to the placement of the rail line on Richmond. During that year, Tom Valega, a property owner in Sunset Terrace/Montclair quoted in the Houston Chronicle, argued that the light rail should be placed on Richmond Avenue because the light rail can get additional ridership, and the federal funding of the light rail line depends upon ridership figures.

In 2008 Steve Halvorson, a resident of Sunset Terrace, said in a 2008 meeting outside of Houston City Hall that on a yearly basis, after the Tropical Storm Allison in 2001, flooding had occurred in Sunset Terrace.

Harris Health System (formerly Harris County Hospital District) designated Martin Luther King Health Center in southeast Houston for ZIP code 77005. The nearest public hospital is Ben Taub General Hospital in the Texas Medical Center.

== Culture ==
Many Sunset Terrace residents plan neighborhood events.

== Education ==
=== Primary and secondary schools ===
==== Public schools ====
The Houston Independent School District serves residents of Sunset Terrace.

- West University Elementary School
- Pershing Middle School (Pin Oak Middle School as an option)
- Lamar High School

Before August 1994, a portion of the neighborhood was served by West University Elementary, and a portion was served by Will Rogers Elementary School. Historically West University Elementary had higher test scores than Will Rogers. After The Rice School opened, West U Elementary was relieved of many students, and the West U attendance boundary was modified to include all of Sunset Terrace/Montclair. In 1995 C.T.I. Information Services stated that test scores of the Texas Assessment of Academic Skills (TAAS) test at West U, Pershing, and Lamar were above average. Davis Whiteford, president of the Sunset Terrace/Montclair Civic Association, said that the schools attracted many homebuyers to Sunset Terrace.

=== Colleges and universities ===
Houston Community College System serves Sunset Terrace.

== Postal services ==
The closest United States Postal Service office is the Weslayan Post Office at 5340 Weslayan Street, Houston, Texas, 77005-1048.

== Media ==
The Houston Chronicle is the area regional newspaper.

The West University Examiner is a local newspaper distributed in the community .

The Village News and Southwest News is a local newspaper distributed in the community.

== Notable residents ==
- Maryann Young, Candidate for Houston City Council District C, spokesperson for city controller George Greanias, public affairs consultant, and news reporter (Sunset Terrace) - Young served as the president of the Sunset Terrace/Montclair civic association
