= St. Mark's Episcopal School (West University Place, Texas) =

School in Texas, United States

Coordinates: 29.70634°N 95.437567°W

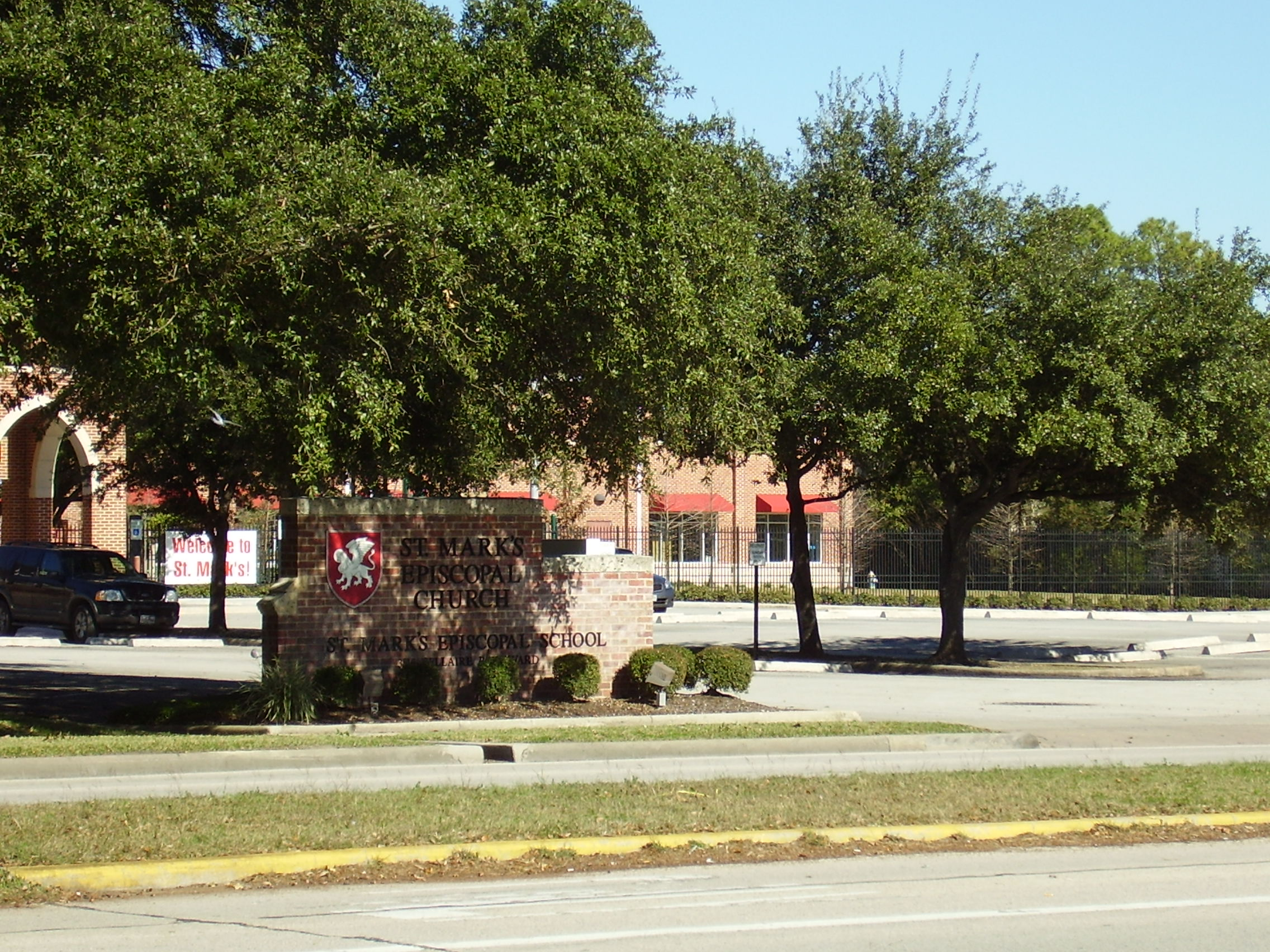

Information
- Established: 1960; 66 years ago
- Grades: Preschool - Grade 8
- Age: 2 to 14

St. Mark's Episcopal School is a private primary and secondary school located in the Cambridge Place development and in West University Place, Texas, in Greater Houston. St. Mark's serves preschool (ages 18 months and up) through Grade 8. The school is located four miles from the Texas Medical Center and minutes south of the Galleria. St. Mark's is a part of the Episcopal Diocese of Texas and is accredited by the Independent Schools Association of the Southwest and the Southwest Association of Episcopal Schools. The current headmaster of the school is Garhett Wagers.

The school is structured into three divisions - primary school (preschool 2s through kindergarten), lower school (1st through 4th grade), and middle school (5th through 8th grade).

== History ==
St. Mark's Episcopal School was created in 1960 as an educational ministry of St. Mark's Episcopal Church. The school operated as a nursery school for years then gradually began adding elementary grades. The first 8th grade class graduated in 1988. The school received its initial accreditation from the Southwestern Association of Episcopal Schools (recognized by the Texas Education Agency) in 1990. The school earned accreditation from the Independent Schools Association of the Southwest in 2017.

== Facilities ==
The school occupies four main buildings on campus, including three computer labs, a library, three science labs, a basketball court serving as a gymnasium and stage, a multi-purpose cafeteria, a "flex space" for extracurricular activities, a music room, and an art room. The campus is networked, allowing students to work in the labs or on classroom computers.

== Extended Care ==
The afterschool program is available to families with students in grades preschool 3s through 8th grade who need daily or part-time after-school care. The program includes snack time, outside recreation, homework time for older students, and informal indoor activities for younger children.

The before-school program is available to families in need of an early drop-off for students in preschool 3s through 8th Grade.

== Clubs and Activities ==
Some of the clubs include cooking, piano, guitar, violin, Tae Kwon Do, USA Chess, ceramics, fencing, golf, and origami.

== Athletics ==
The middle school students at St. Mark's compete in GHAC (Greater Houston Athletic Conference). The St. Mark's middle school athletics program includes volleyball, soccer, cross country, basketball, swimming, golf, tennis, track & field, and baseball. Lower School students can participate in soccer, cross country, basketball, bounceball, and touch football.

== See also ==
- Christianity in Houston
