= Pershing Middle School (Houston) =

Middle school in Houston, Texas

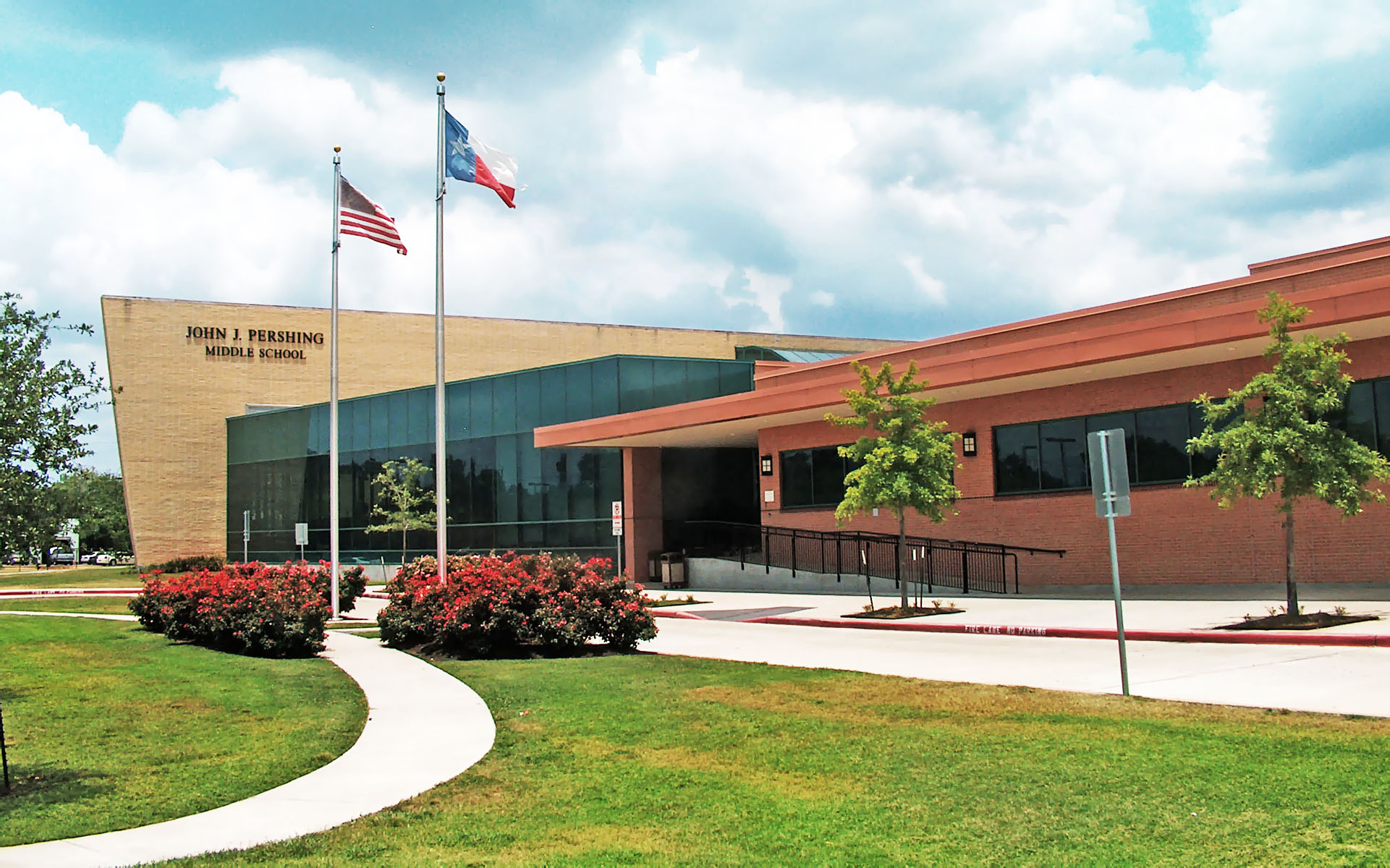

Location
- 3838 Bluebonnet Boulevard; Houston, Texas 77025 w United States; 29.701641°N 95.438780°W

Information
- Type: Public
- Established: 1928
- School district: Houston Independent School District
- Principal: Stephanie Lugo Velez
- Staff: 77.29 (FTE)
- Grades: 6-8
- Enrollment: 1,270 (2022-23)
- Student to teacher ratio: 16.43
- Colors: Red, black, and gray
- Mascot: Panda
- Magnet: Fine arts
- Website: Pershing Middle School

John J. Pershing Middle School is a middle school in Houston, Texas, United States. It is located in the Braeswood Place neighborhood, near the Texas Medical Center.

The school, that serves around 1,270 students in grades 6 through 8, is managed by the Houston Independent School District. Pershing has a neighborhood program and a Pre-AP Gifted and Talented program, and is a fine arts magnet school.

== History ==
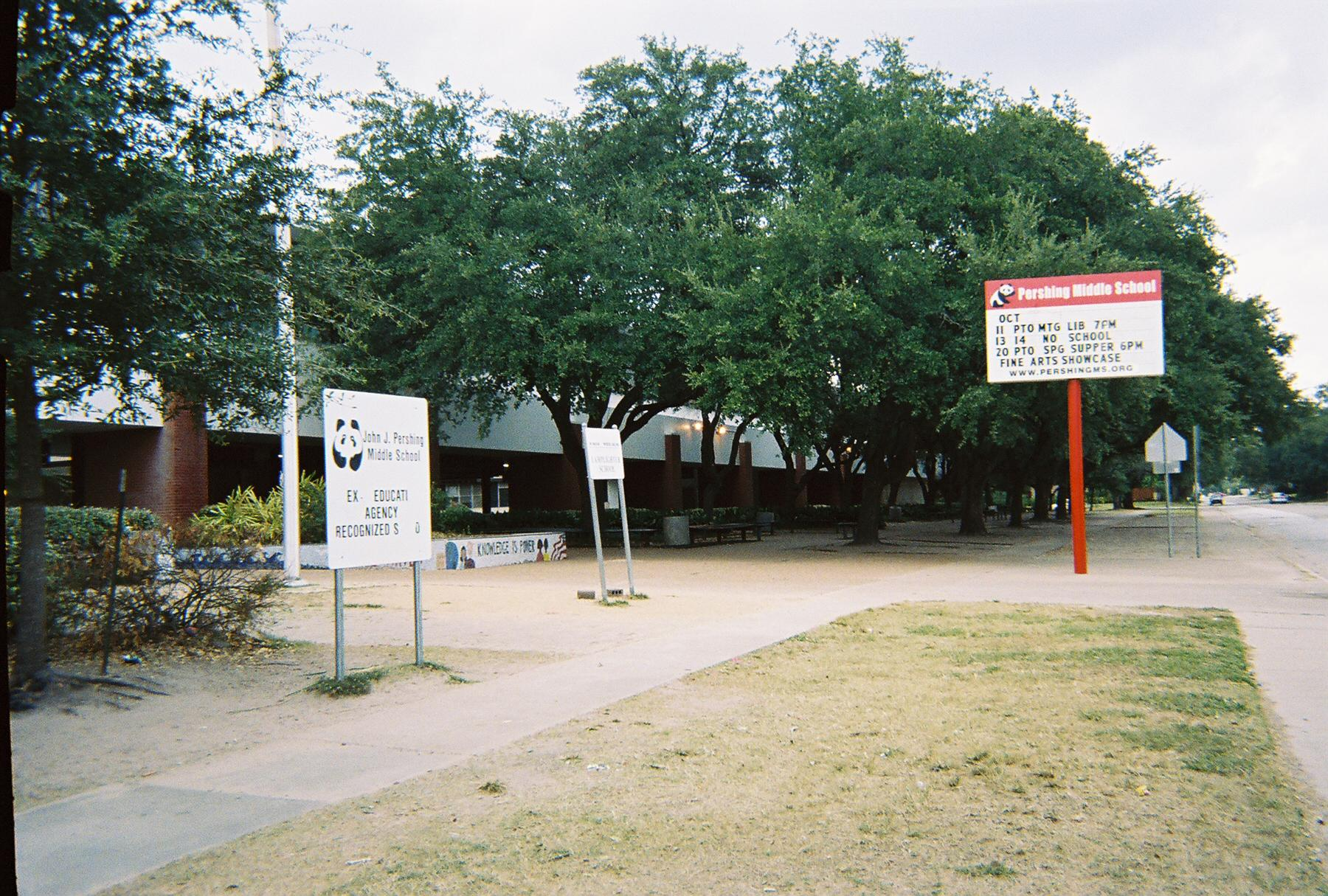
Former 1949 campus

West University Place Pershing Junior High School, was founded in 1928 by President Calvin Coolidge in honor of General John J. Pershing. Pershing originally was connected to West University Elementary School (which was located in the city of West University Place after the city incorporated in 1938); the school moved to its own campus at 7000 Braes Boulevard in Houston in 1949. The campus was worth $2 million. This relieved West University Elementary. It was funded by a 1944 bond, and the Braes Heights Realty Company had donated the land. University of Texas academics had suggested a different plan of action, but the decision to separate West University Elementary and Pershing into separate campuses was made by HISD superintendent W. E. Moreland, along with the business manager, H. L. Mills.

An arson incident occurred in August 1958.

Pershing was previously reserved for white children but it desegregated by 1970.

In September 1991 Pershing was one of 32 HISD schools that had capped enrollments; in other words the school was filled to capacity and excess students had to attend other schools. In 1992 there was a proposal to convert Gordon Elementary in Bellaire into a middle school to serve Bellaire residents. This proposal was favored by those zoned to Jane Long Middle School but it was opposed by those zoned to Pershing as they did not want to lose access to the school. The Gordon proposal ultimately did not happen.

Pershing had, in March 2002, a waiting list of 1,000 students for 120 places.

Originally, Houston ISD planned to remodel Pershing's 1949 campus. When HISD found that building a new campus from scratch would be more cost-effective, HISD decided to pursue that goal. Construction started on Pershing's brand new two-story 216,000-square-foot (20,100 m^{2}) campus at 3838 Bluebonnet (on the same site as the old campus) during the summer of 2005. Construction was expected to end in Summer 2007, and the new campus was originally expected to open in Fall 2007. The lead architect for the campus was PGAL, with Gilbane as the lead project manager. The original budget was $16,900,000 United States dollars. The construction costs totaled $24.4 million, and the final costs, including books, computers, and architect engineers, totaled $31 million.

The previous campus had a capacity of 1,500 students; because enrollment was 1,700 as of fall 2004 Pershing had to cap enrollment of the 6th and 7th grades. The school district had to adjust its plans for Pershing's campus due to the unexpected surge in enrollment. The new building was built on the previous athletic fields, and the previous building was to close after the opening of the new one. After demolition of the previous building, the new athletic fields would go on its former site.

The new building opened on Thursday, January 18, 2007; originally the building was slated to open the previous day, but weather conditions lead to the temporary closing of all HISD schools for January 17.

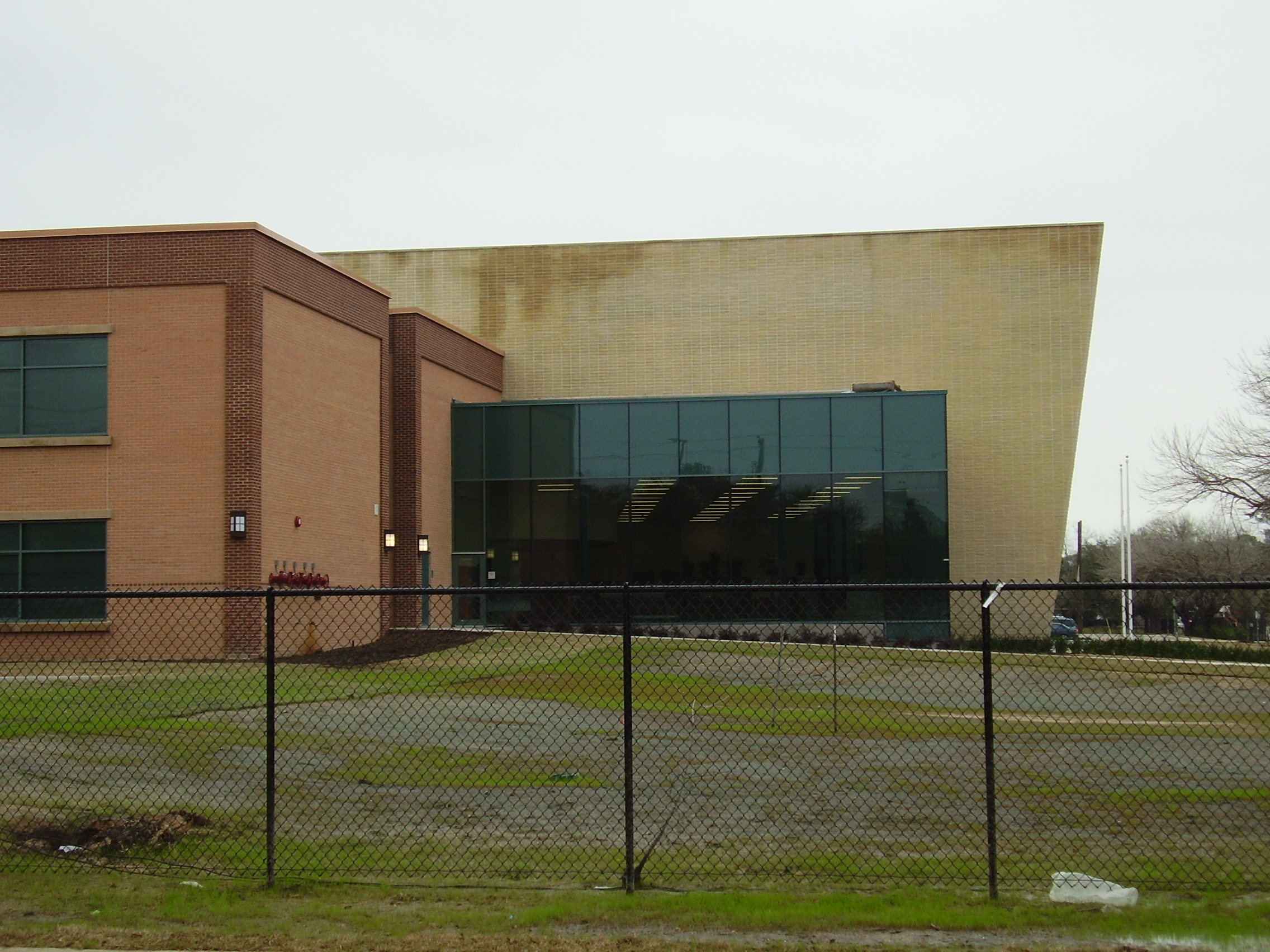
Pershing Middle School's campus prior to the addition of lettering

Portions of the former Pershing building remain because many chimney swift birds appeared in the chimney. The Migratory Bird Act makes the act of tearing down the Pershing chimney illegal.

In April 2014 two librarians at the school were informed that budget cuts would eliminate their positions. Michelle Leigh Smith of the Village News and Southwest News stated that "parents believe many of HISD Superintendent Terry Grier's policies are tearing the district apart" and that because principal Kim Heckman "is considered one of Grier's rising stars" therefore "[s]ome believe Heckman is carrying out his agenda" at Pershing.

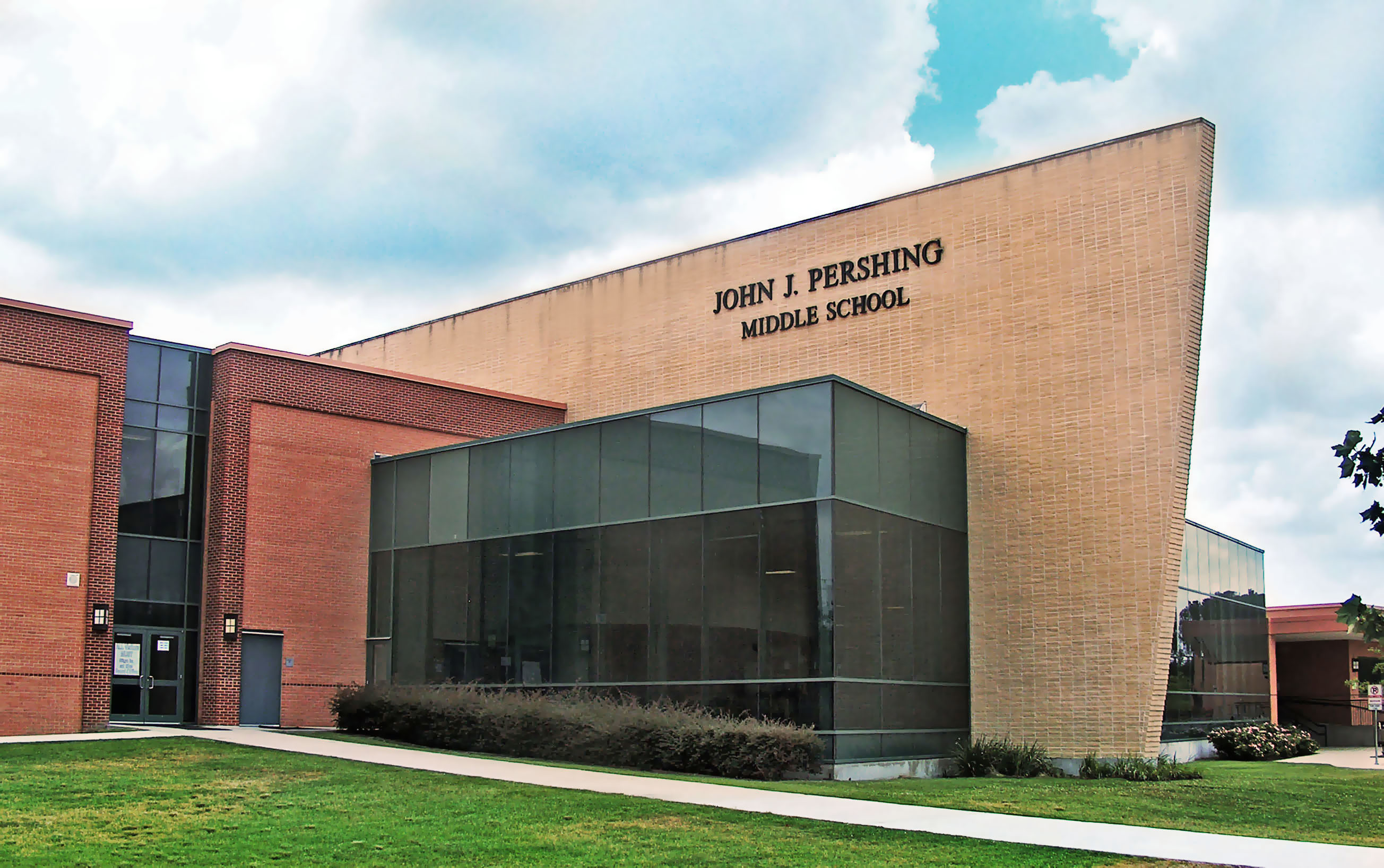
Campus as seen from Stella Link

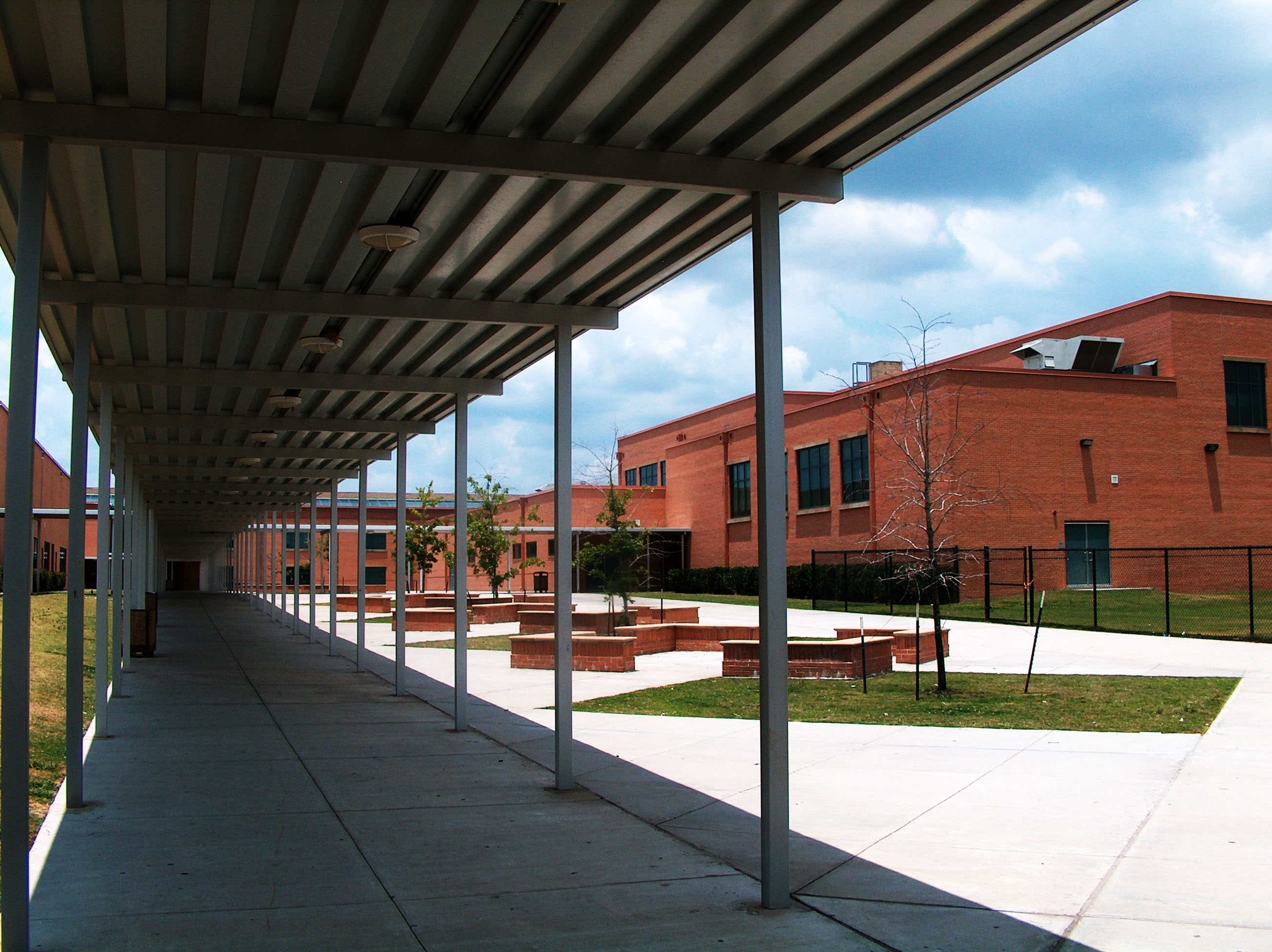
Rear of the campus

== Neighborhoods served by Pershing ==
Pershing, which is located in the Braeswood Place neighborhood, serves several areas of Houston that are in and out of the 610 Loop, including Braeswood Place, Linkwood, Knollwood Village, Woodshire, Woodside, Westridge, Southgate, Old Braeswood, Morningside Place, Westwood, Link Valley, a portion of Meyerland, a portion of Maplewood, and Sunset Terrace/Montclair. In addition to portions of Houston, Pershing also serves the cities of Bellaire, Southside Place, and West University Place.

Rice Village Apartments and Morningside Square, two Rice University graduate housing complexes that admit families, are zoned to this school.

Around the early 1990s portions of the City of Bellaire west of the 610 Loop were zoned to Jane Long Middle School, while portions inside the 610 Loop were zoned to Pershing.

As of 2010 about 600 students, one third of the students at Pershing, do not live in the school's attendance zone, and about 600 students that year who were zoned to West University Elementary School, one of Pershing's feeder schools, were enrolled in Pin Oak Middle School or Lanier Middle School. In 2010 two parents, Adrienne Vanderbloemen and Christi Young, started a blog that supported the idea of sending one's child to Pershing Middle School.

== Academics ==
It is a fine arts magnet school, which specializes in music. The school clusters students into groups of 150. Each grade level has a number of clusters of students. One team of teachers is assigned to each cluster and this group of teachers is asked to know the students and their families. The racial demographics of each cluster are engineered to match that of the entire school. William G. Ouchi, author of Making Schools Work: A Revolutionary Plan to Get Your Children the Education They Need, wrote that this "achieves an intimate scale" for the students.

In 2008, 93% of students passed state tests, with 84% of black students passing and 79% of Hispanic students passing. Seven years earlier, 67% of students passed state tests, with 47% of black students passing and 37% of Hispanic students passing.

As of 2010, teacher Charles Coursey requires students to do gardening before their instructional time and during afternoons. During class he allows students to eat portions of the vegetables that were harvested in the garden. On Saturdays the organizers sell the rest of the produce at the Rice University farmers' market. The proceeds go to purchasing supplies for the gardening program.

== Athletics ==
Teams are known as the 'Pandas'. Sports teams include football, baseball, basketball, track and field, swimming, soccer, cross country, and lacrosse for boys and volleyball, cross country, swimming, basketball, track and field, lacrosse and softball for girls.

== Student body ==
As of the 2013-14 school year Pershing educated 1,656 students, making it HISD's second largest middle school. During the 2011-12 school year, Pershing served 1,748 students.

- 40% were African American
- 35% were Hispanic American
- 16% were White American
- 7% were Asian American
- 1% were two or more races
- Less than 1% were Native American
- Approximately 26% of the students qualified for free or reduced-price lunch.

In 2008 William G. Ouchi, author of Making Schools Work: A Revolutionary Plan to Get Your Children the Education They Need, described Pershing as a racially and socioeconomically diverse school. That year, Pershing had a large number of immigrant students. As of 2008, of the 1,903 students at the school, 405 were in the fine arts program. There were 1,610 students that attended the school five years earlier. In 2008, there were 150 slots for new entrants into the magnet program and there were 1,100 applicants.

== Feeder patterns ==
Many students at Pershing move on to Bellaire High School and Lamar High School, two public high schools considered to be elite.

Elementary schools that feed into Pershing include:

- Condit
- Mark Twain
- West University

The following elementary schools partially feed into Pershing:

- Horn
- Longfellow
- Lovett
- Red
- Roberts
- Shearn

High schools which have attendance zones coinciding with Pershing include Bellaire, Lamar, Madison, Westbury, and Margaret Long Wisdom (formerly Robert E. Lee High School). All pupils zoned to Margaret Long Wisdom may also choose to go to Lamar or Westside high schools.

All students zoned to Pershing have the option to attend Pin Oak Middle School.

== Notable alumni ==
- Dennis Quaid, actor
- Randy Quaid, actor
- Farrah Fawcett, actress
- Phylicia Rashad, actor
- Debbie Allen, American actress, dancer, choreographer, television director, television producer, and a member of the President's Committee on the Arts and Humanities.
- A. J. Foyt, Jr. (also attended Hamilton Middle School and Lamar and San Jacinto high schools)
- Marvin Zindler, KTRK-TV ABC-13 news reporter who ended the Chicken Ranch in La Grange, Texas. He appeared at the school's 75th anniversary in 2003.
- Josh Gordon, Pro Bowl NFL Wide Receiver, attended the school for his 8th grade year.

== Notes ==
Preceded by Condit, Mark Twain, West University, Horn, Longfellow, Lovett, Red, Roberts, Shearn	Houston Independent School District; Grades 6-8	Succeeded by Bellaire, Lamar, Madison, Westbury, Westside, Wisdom
