= The Rice School =

School in Houston, Texas, United States

- La Escuela Rice
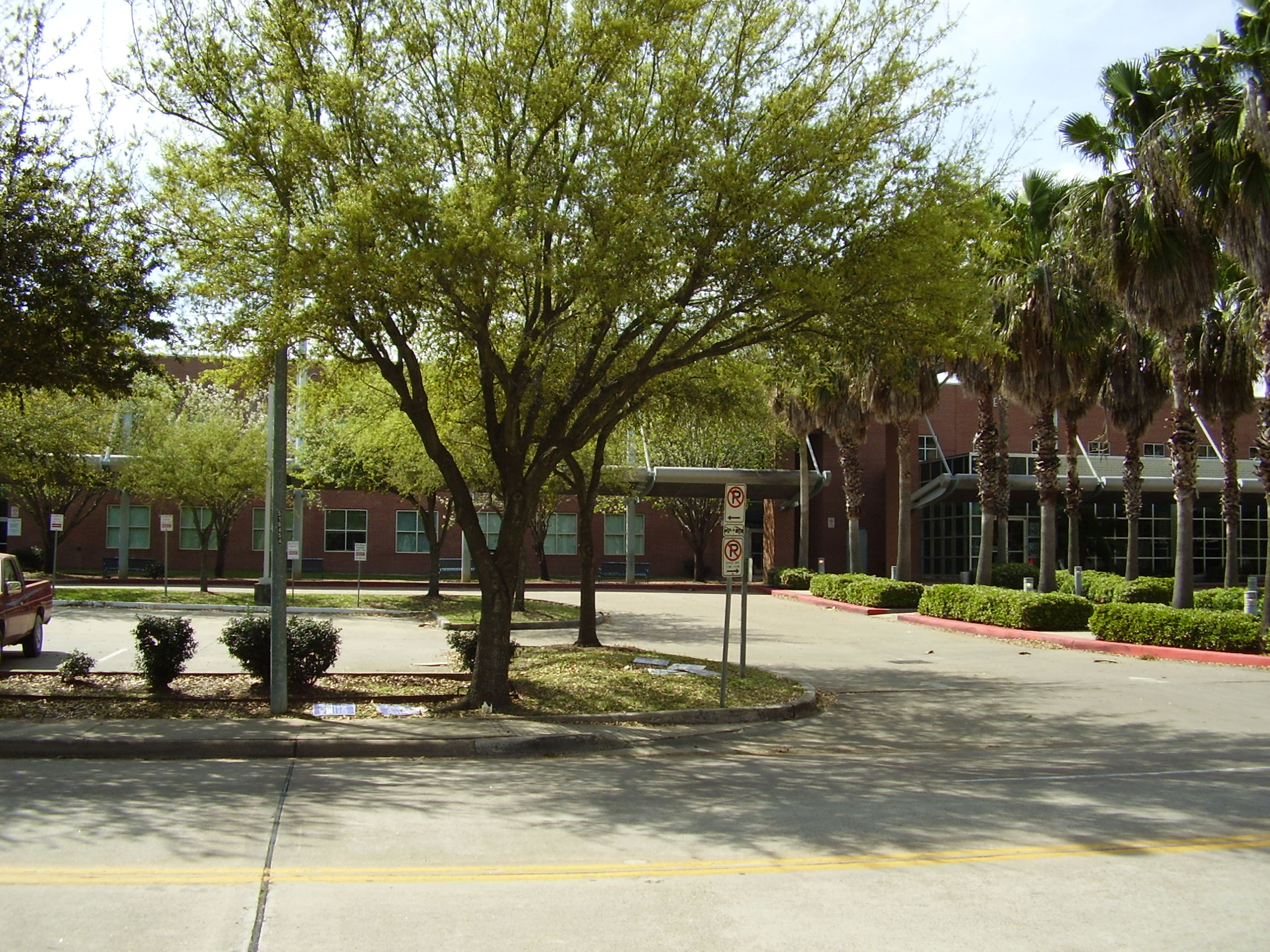

Location
- Braeswood Place, Houston, Texas; United States; 29.6978°N 95.4206°W

Information
- Type: Magnet school
- Established: August 1994
- School district: Houston Independent School District
- Principal: Kimberly Hobbs
- Faculty: 63.99 (FTE)
- Grades: Kindergarten—8th
- Enrollment: 1,152 (2017-18)
- Student to teacher ratio: 18.00
- Website: The Rice School

The Rice School (Spanish: La Escuela Rice) is a K-8 school (the school serves grades kindergarten through 8) in Houston, Texas. Rice is a part of the Houston Independent School District (HISD).

The Rice School is an HISD magnet school for a Science, Technology, Engineering, and Math (STEM), serving grades Kindergarten - 8th grade. The Rice School is a part of a collaboration between Houston ISD and Rice University.

Students living near Rice are not zoned to Rice, as Rice is an all-magnet school. Individuals living near Rice are zoned to either Twain or Roberts elementary schools and Pershing Middle School.

The Rice School is located east of the Braeswood Place neighborhood. It is across from the City of West University Place Sewage Plant and Animal Pound, which itself is located in the Houston city limits. The school was named after William Marsh Rice, the founder of Rice University.

== History ==
=== Planning ===
Joan Raymond, then the superintendent of HISD, envisioned The Rice School as a way to relieve overcrowding at West University Elementary School, to stem the decrease of White and affluent students, and to gap the performance division between affluent White students and low income minority students. The Rice School was originally planned as a regular zoned school with an attendance boundary. In 1989, as "Operation Renewal," a school construction program, progressed, Raymond thought about how to lure West University Elementary School-zoned parents away from West University Elementary; she decided that a partnership with Rice University would allow this to happen. Rice's education department had no experience teaching younger students, so the laboratory school was made into a K-8. Tim Fleck of the Houston Press stated that the Rice University label "sold like Lacoste." The district planned to find a site for the school; plans to put the school on Brompton Road failed, and an attempt to buy land at Bissonnet Street at Newcastle Drive in the City of Bellaire failed since City of Bellaire officials and parents living in Bellaire complained when they learned that they would not be zoned to the new school while losing what Fleck described as "a prime chunk of taxable property." Raymond settled on a site on North Braeswood Drive, fulfilling what Fleck described as "minimal expectations."

The concept was sold to the school board. Don McAdams, an HISD school board member who had supported the development of the Rice School from the time of conception to the approval by the school board, said that the board members wanted concessions specific to their districts, and the school's racial quotas were devised so that the school served the entire school district to satisfy the demands. Fleck said that The Rice School's concept "mushroomed into an incredibly complex educational experiment that aspired to be all things to all parties with an interest in its success." The intention was to attract students from the West University Place area by the promotion of the school's ties to Rice University, the presence of, in Fleck's words, "more computers than a private school," [sic] and the grouping of classes into clusters; in the clusters students would progress at their own rates and tutor one another. Residents of lower income inner city neighborhoods were to be attracted to Rice as a way to have their children avoid neighborhood schools with violent incidents. Rice University was to benefit from additional ties to the Houston community and having educational theories demonstrated in practice. According to McAdams, many people, especially West University Place residents, believed that the school would have selected gifted and talented admissions because of the association with Rice University. In 1997 McAdams retrospectively said "there were high expectations -- admittedly unreasonable expectations."

=== Opening ===
The school opened in August 1994. Kaye Stripling was the first principal. Circa January 1995 Stripling left her position as she received a promotion, and Sharon Koonce, previously at Oak Forest Elementary, replaced her.

About 1,280 students from Kindergarten through 6th grade were enrolled when the school opened. Over 7,169 students applied for 1,275 slots, and half of the students previously attended overcrowded schools in the West University Place area. Fewer than 15 students who were offered admission declined the offer. Many teachers at Rice came from other Houston ISD schools. The elementary school grades had about 50% White Americans, and 25% each Hispanic Americans and Black Americans. The middle school grades had about 33% each of White, Black, and Hispanic students. Of all Rice students, 11% were Asian Americans. The students lived all across the City of Houston. Initially the school organized students from Kindergarten through 2nd grade into one cluster, 3rd through 5th grades in another cluster, and the middle school grades in another cluster. According to McAdams, many parties felt unsatisfied by the outcome of the student placement lottery. Eight student placements per grade level were reserved for dependents of Rice University employees. McAdams wrote that this caused controversy. McAdams stated that because students not previously enrolled in HISD were allowed to enter into the Rice lottery if they were entering Kindergarten or the 6th grade, area private school parents were unsatisfied. In addition, he stated that "Parents in an older, affluent community" immediately to the school's east had no dedicated entry into the lottery system so they were also unsatisfied. Furthermore he stated that principals of area schools perceived the Rice School to receiving extra resources, making them unsatisfied. Also, according to McAdams, Rice was taking more students from nearby area neighborhood schools than anticipated had angered leaders of those schools. McAdams added that "there were charges that the lottery was fixed and so-and-so got in because of backroom influence."

In 1994 Melanie Markley of the Houston Chronicle said that Rice, "with its distinctive architecture and its progressive curriculum -- promises to be a kind of flagship school for a district hoping to replicate many of its already apparent successes." McAdams wrote that the controversies over placements dissipated after the school opened.

=== Decline in the 1990s ===
By 1997 not very many of the teachers who were at the school during its start had remained. Many affluent parents had stopped sending their children to The Rice School, saying that the "integrated" freeform curriculum neglected basic mathematics and reading skills. In August 1997, the Texas Education Agency ranked The Rice School as the sole "Low Performing" school within the Houston Independent School District. Fleck stated that the statistic was "somewhat misleading" since it measured the performances of economically disadvantaged pupils in the Texas Assessment of Academic Skills (TAAS); Fleck said that the ranking was "a major embarrassment for the school district and served to underscore the gap between the children of affluent white parents and minority students that the Rice School was designed to bridge."

McAdams wrote that the divide in terms of class and neighborhood origins between the White affluent parents and the low income Black and Hispanic parents were more significant than the differences in ethnicity, and the differences contributed to the decline of the school.

In June 1997 Koonce was removed as principal, and Sandra Satterwhite took her position at that time. According to Fleck, "many Rice School parents turned against her because she had not found a way to enforce consistency on the quality of teaching at the school." At that time HISD replaced not only the principal but the entire management team. The district announced that the school was being moved to the alternative district, the HISD-wide district handling magnet schools. In 1997 the district negotiated with Rice University to strengthen the partnership. According to McAdams, HISD previously emphasized to Rice University that the Rice School was an HISD school and that the attitude damaged the relationship between the two entities.

=== 2000s and 2010s ===
In the 2006-2007 school year, the Texas Education Agency gave the school a "recognized" rating. In December 2007 Linda Lazenby, the principal of The Rice School said, as paraphrased by Jennifer Radcliffe of the Houston Chronicle that "she's thrilled her 1,100-student campus can serve as the poster child of success for the K-8 model in Houston."

In 2014 Rice had about 1,150 students, over the school's official capacity. As of 2015 it was being used to house excess students from Roberts, Twain, and West University elementary schools, which were all at capacity.

== Concept ==
The school opened with a partnership with Rice University. Since its opening the school has dual language instruction; all students learn in English and Spanish. When the school first opened, mathematics was used as a link to thread the curriculum throughout the various studies. The school had classes mixing multiple grades where students of different grades worked with one another. When the school opened it had the latest in computer technology. Classrooms were grouped in clusters, with each cluster having five classrooms. The school's full name, "The Rice School / La Escuela Rice," is bilingual. As of the 1994 opening, every sign within the school is in English and Spanish.

== Facility ==
It is located on at the corner of Kirby Drive and North Braeswood Boulevard, with the campus west of Kirby Drive. When the school opened, the corner was wooded. The street leading into the school was named "Seuss Drive," after the children's literature author Dr. Seuss. The Rice School community suggested that the street be named after Dr. Seuss.

Taft Architects designed the 170,000-square-foot (16,000 m^{2}) school building. The construction cost was $11 million. This two story, 167,000 square feet (15,500 m^{2}) building was designed to facilitate the school's learning cluster model. An interior skylit plaza connects various areas of the school's. The administration area and the teacher resource center are connected to one another. In 1997 Fleck wrote "In contrast to the rigidly institutionalized, boxed-in layout of most HISD schools, the Rice School is a marvel of light and space, projecting a sense of openness and possibility." Palm trees are located next to the school sidewalks. The school library is called a "Learning Arcade." Fleck stated that the library is the centerpiece of the building. The school walls have pastel colors.

The school building has an official capacity of 1,056 students.

== Admissions ==
When the school first opened, it had about 1,200 slots. To distribute the slots, the school used a racially balanced lottery that allocated about one thirds of the total slots to overflow students from West University Elementary School and two thirds of the total slots to other areas in the district, with priority for African American and Hispanic students. In addition the 2/3 portion was weighted for gender. About 70 openings were reserved for children of Rice University faculty and staff. There were no academic admission standards, leading the student body to initially include middle and low income African-Americans and Hispanics and wealthy Whites with varying ranges of ability.

As of 2009 all Rice School students are admitted by magnet transfers.

== Student body ==
Around 2009, the school typically has about 680 elementary school students and 470 middle school students. The students live throughout the school district, 90% of students go to and from school on school district-provided transportation. As of 2007, 90% of the students at Rice are racial and ethnic minorities (racial groups other than non-Hispanic white), and 60% are classified as low income students.

In 2002 Jocelyn Mouton, the Rice School principal, said that the K-8 setup allows eight grades to learn responsibility by tending to younger children, while younger children admire older children. She added that the format allows children to learn from both elementary and middle school teachers at the same time, starting with the first year. For most of the school day, middle school students are separated from elementary school students. When middle schoolers interact with elementary schoolers, middle schoolers are placed in mentorship positions over elementary school students.

When the school first opened in 1994, 50% of the students were White, 25% were Hispanic, and 25% were Black. At the time 72 children of Rice University employees attended the school. In 1996 the students were about 37% White, 33% Black, 27% Hispanic, and 3% Asian.

== School uniforms ==
Rice requires school uniforms for all of its students. The requirement has been in place since its founding.

According to Nancy Ross, a former Rice School parent quoted in the Houston Press, originally the uniforms were to be white T-shirts and blue jeans. Ross said that, at social functions, she overheard wealthier parents express a preference for polo shirts and khakis similar to those worn by students of the St. John's School, a private school. Tim Fleck of the Houston Press said that this was an example of wealthier parents getting to "set the agenda" at Rice. The uniform, decided by parents and students, ultimately consisted of khaki trousers, shorts, and skirts and red, white, and blue polo shirts. The school's first fundraiser was a uniform assistance fund aimed at raising uniform money for 150 families.

Tops consist of red, white, or navy shirts with the school insignia. Trousers, shorts, and skirts must be khaki.
