= Village News and Southwest News =

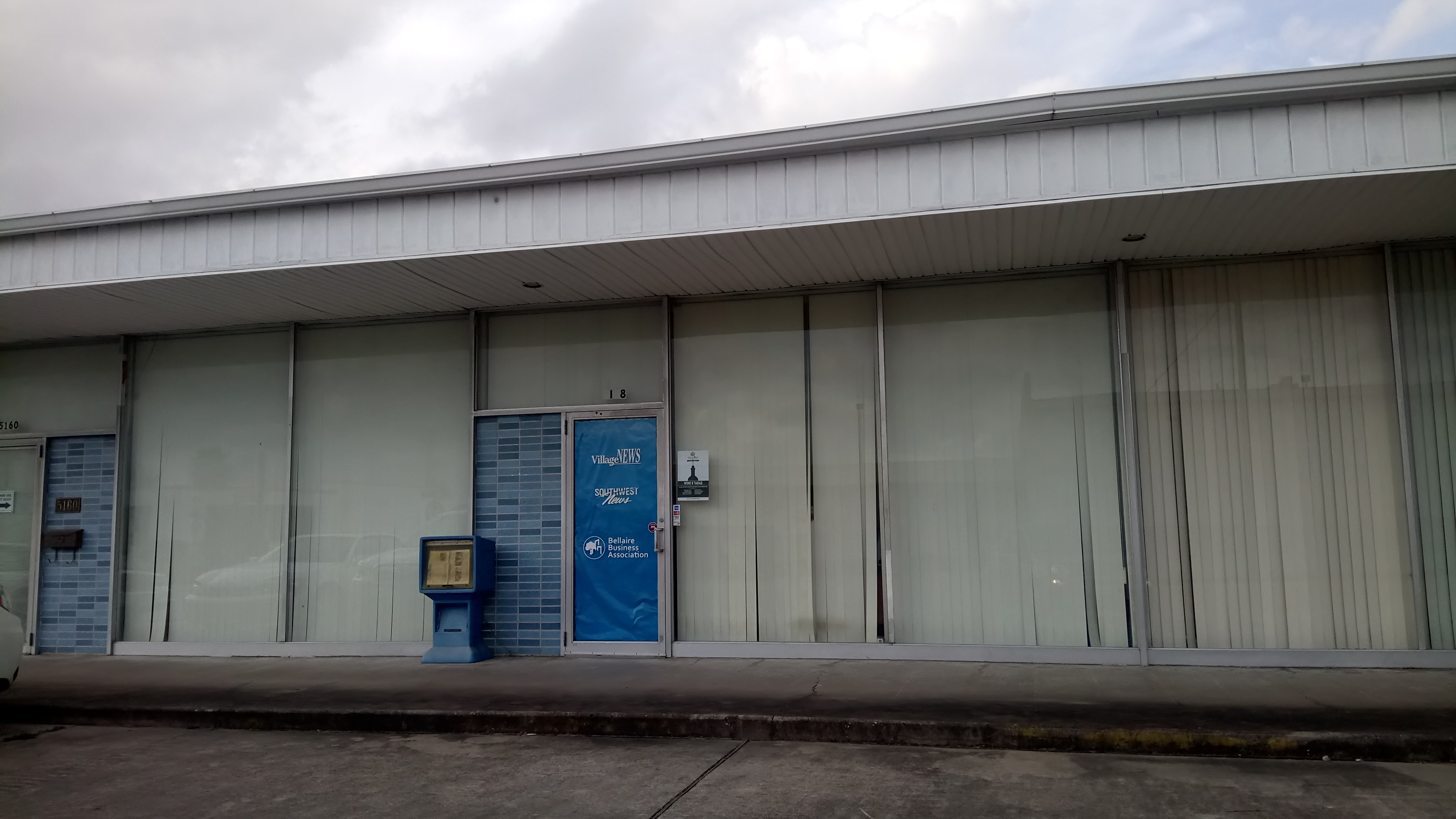
Headquarters

The Village News and Southwest News is a local newspaper in Greater Houston, headquartered in Bellaire, Texas.

As of 2026 it is published by Ben Ballanfant and edited by Katie Tong. It was formerly published and edited by Kathleen "Kathy" Ballanfant (July 11, 1945-June 24, 2022), the mother of the current publisher. The Houston Chronicle wrote in 2013 that Kathy Ballanfant "is known for her local news coverage for the past 28 years." Kathy Ballanfant established the newspaper on June 1, 1985. As of 2005, the newspaper has a circulation of 40,000. As of 2014 the newspaper is delivered to over 35,000 houses while about 5,000 copies are left at countertops in public places. These public places that distribute the newspaper include grocery stores, civic centers, libraries, restaurants, and retail stores.

Ballanfant also publishes the El Rincón, a Spanish newspaper.

== Circulation area ==
The circulation area includes the following ZIP codes within the 610 Loop: 77005, 77006, 77025, 77030, 77046 and 77098; and the following ZIP codes outside of the 610 Loop: 77035, 77074, 77081, 77096, and 77401. The newspaper also has defined areas where it only does business countertop delivery and no home delivery. Areas in the newspaper's home delivery service area include Bellaire, Southside Place, West University Place, and several neighborhoods of Houston. Houston neighborhoods include Afton Oaks, Braeswood Place, Linkwood, Maplewood, Meyerland, Morningside Place, Old Braeswood, Southampton, Southgate, Sunset Terrace, portions of Upper Kirby, portions of Westbury, portions of Willowbend, and Willow Meadows.

Areas in the countertop only zone include: portions of Upper Kirby, portions of Westbury, and portions of Willowbend.

== See also ==
- Examiner Newspaper Group (Bellaire Examiner and West University Examiner)

== Archives ==
To access the archives of previous issues of the two newspapers, click on the link to the Current Issue; once the current issue opens, then click the "Archives" tag on the left side of the web page. The archives include issues of both The Village News and the Southwest News from 2009 to present. At this time, there no search feature for the archives.
