= West University Place, Texas =

Enclave city in Texas, United States

City of West University Place
- City
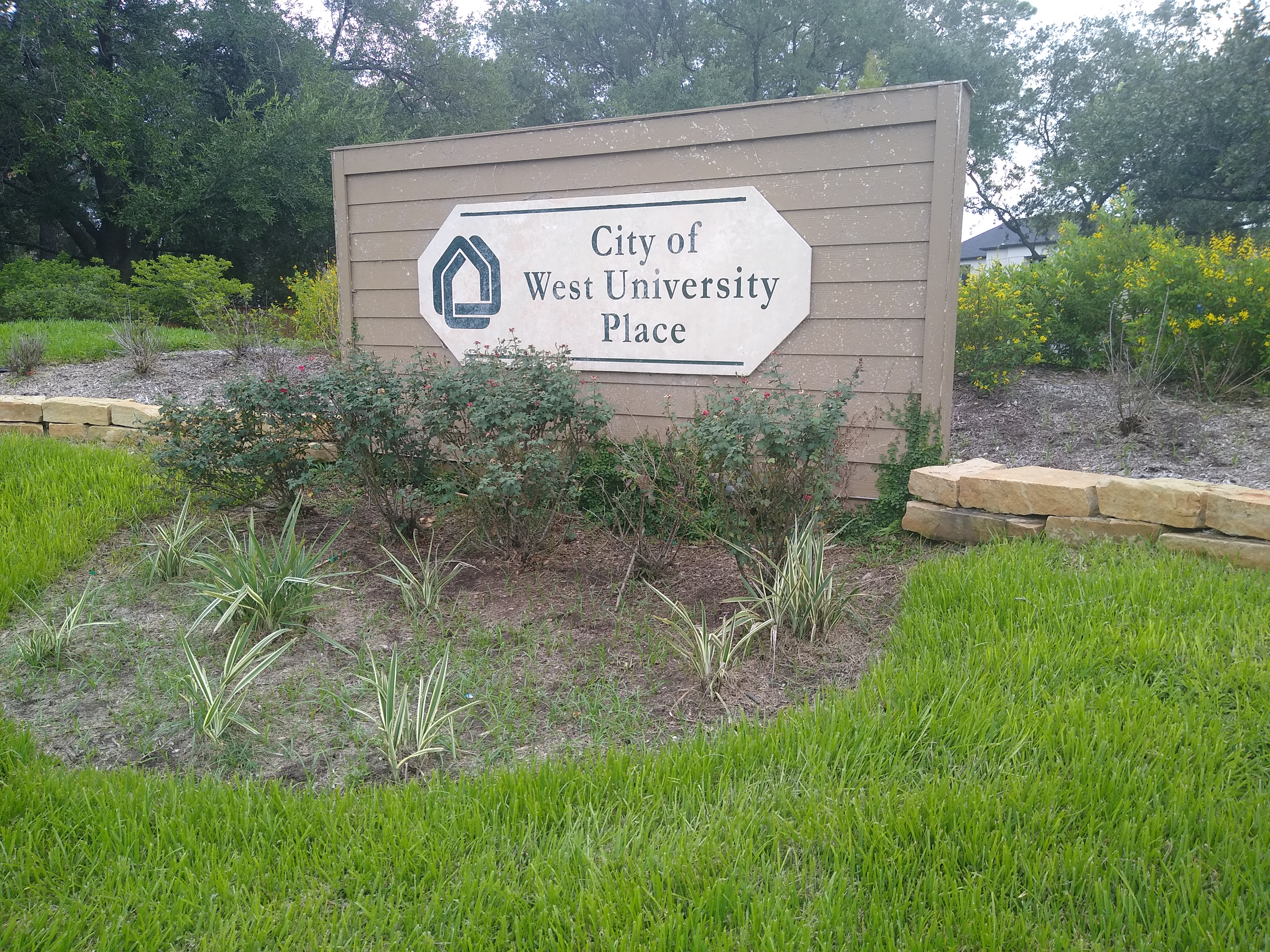
- Welcome sign at West University Place

- Flag

- Location in Harris County and the state of Texas
- Coordinates: 29°42′57″N 95°25′59″W
- Country: United States
- State: Texas
- County: Harris

Government
  - Mayor: Susan Sample (elected in 2021)

Area
  - Total: 2.00 sq mi (5.19 km^{2})
  - Land: 2.00 sq mi (5.19 km^{2})
  - Water: 0 sq mi (0.00 km^{2})
- Elevation: 49 ft (15 m)

Population (2020)
  - Total: 14,955
  - Density: 7,776.6/sq mi (3,002.58/km^{2})
- Time zone: UTC-6 (Central (CST))
  - Summer (DST): UTC-5 (CDT)
- ZIP code: 77005
- Area codes: 281/346/621/713/832
- FIPS code: 48-77956
- GNIS feature ID: 1349820
- Website: http://westutx.gov/

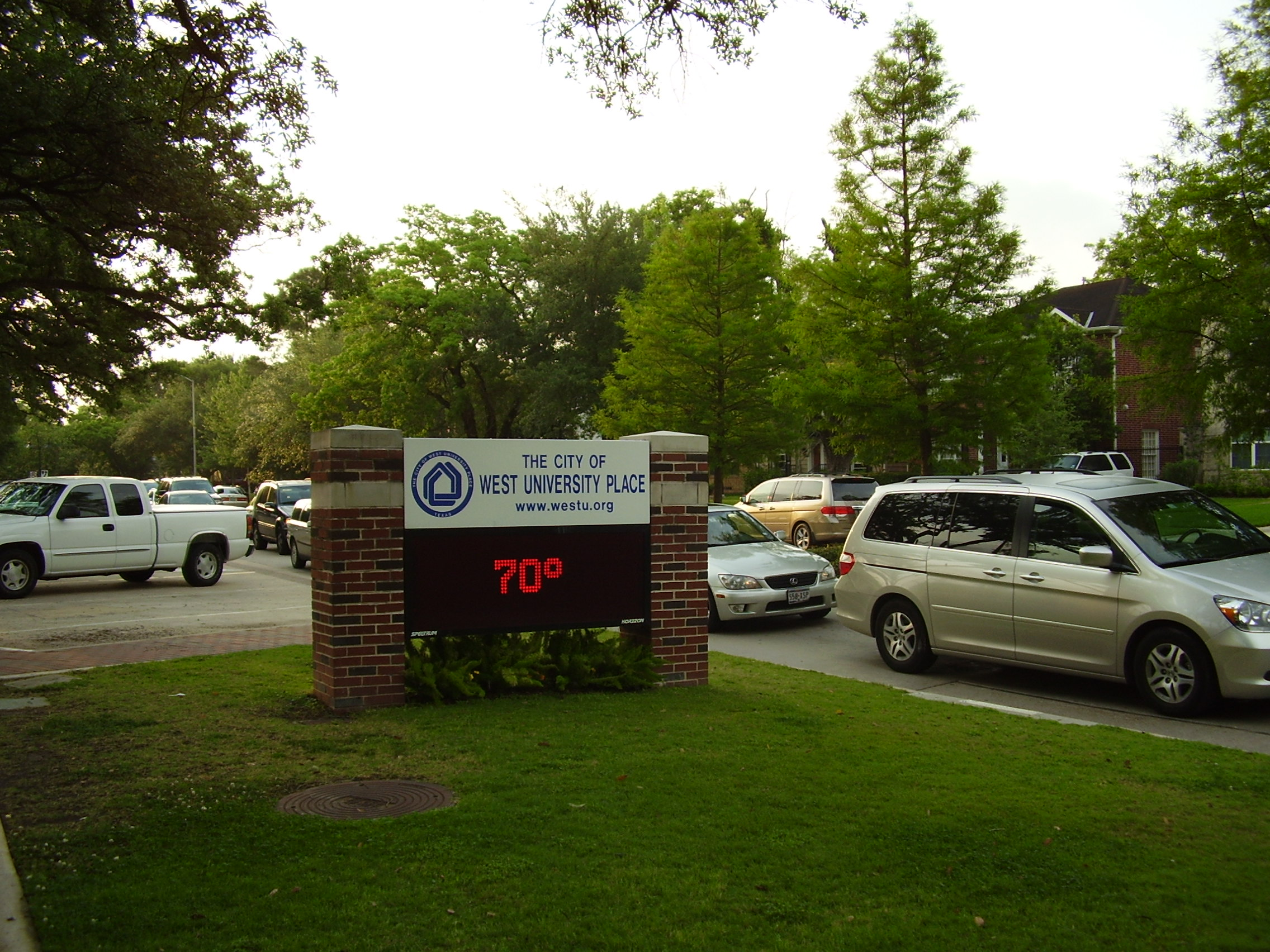
An electronic sign in the center of West University Place

West University Place, often called West University or West U for short, is a city located in the U.S. state of Texas within the Houston metropolitan area and southwestern Harris County. At the 2020 U.S. census, the population of the city was 14,955. It is nicknamed "The Neighborhood City" and is mainly a bedroom community for upper-class families.

West University Place is surrounded by the cities of Bellaire, Houston, and Southside Place. As of 2025, West University Place is the wealthiest suburb in Texas with an average household income of $409,677 and a typical home value of $1,758,363.

== History ==
The city was developed in 1917 by Ben Hooper, a former Tennessee governor. The name "West University Place" originated from its proximity to Rice Institute, now known as Rice University. The first lots in the community were sold in 1917. Portions of West University were previously within the Harris County Poor farm, which extended from an area between Bellaire Boulevard and Bissonnet Street, eastward to an area near the "poor farm ditch."

In the 1920s, Lillian "Lilly" Nicholson, a Rice University English major, lived with a friend whose father was a city planner. The city planner asked Nicholson and her friend to name the streets of West University Place. Nicholson took names from her English literature book and gave them to the streets in West University Place. As a result, many West University streets are named after authors. Cydney Mackey, a family friend of Nicholson, said in a Houston Chronicle article, "Aunt Lilly had always said she wanted to be an architect, unknown for women in that era, and this was her way of making a small but lasting mark on our city's landscape." One street, Weslayan Road, is a misspelling of "Wesleyan."

The City of West University Place was declared incorporated by the County Judge of Harris County on January 2, 1924. The city incorporated because Houston was reluctant to extend power lines that far from the city center. West University Place, unlike Houston Heights, did not consolidate into the City of Houston. Because of the 1923 incorporation, Houston did not incorporate West University Place's territory into its city limits, while Houston annexed surrounding areas that were unincorporated. In 1939, the municipality refused to consolidate, later adopting a formal city charter the following year. The city had around 15,000 residents in the 1960s and the 1970s. The city had 12,714 people in 1990.

Prior to 1992 West University Place liberalized its development rules. This allowed developers to build new houses within the city. Don Stowers of the Houston Post said that West University Place changed from an "aging middle-class neighborhood" consisting of mid-20th century bungalows and cottages to an increasingly wealthy community of "dare we say, young urban professionals in their austere red-brick Georgians." As new houses appeared, property values increased and the city began to get more tax revenue. Eventually, West University Place ran out of available lots, and its construction peaked. Area home buyers began to consider nearby Bellaire because it had more inexpensive and larger lots, and amenities described by Stowers as "comparable" to West University Place's amenities.On October 22, 2018 24/7 Wall Street, which collaborates with USA Today, ranked West University Place the "best city to live in".

== Geography ==
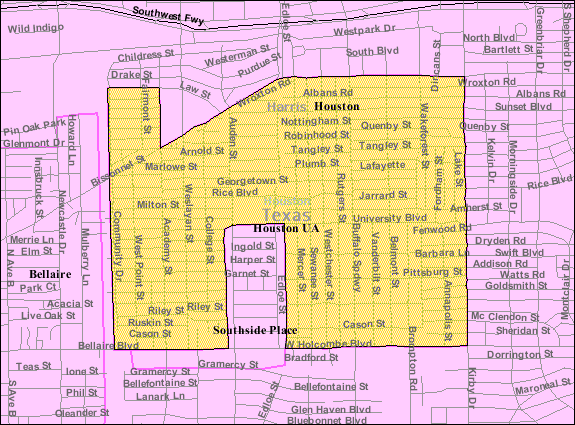
Map of West University Place

West University Place is located at 29°42′57″N 95°25′59″W (29.715929, −95.432992). According to the United States Census Bureau, the city has a total area of 2.0 square miles (5.2 km^{2}), all land. The city of Houston surrounds much of West University Place. The boundaries are roughly Bellaire Boulevard/Holcombe Boulevard, Kirby Drive, Bissonnet Road, and Community Drive. West University Place is 6 miles (9.7 km) from Downtown Houston.

The city's boundaries are Kirby Drive to the east, Union Pacific St. Louis Southwestern Railway railroad track to the west, Bellaire Boulevard/West Holcombe Boulevard to the south, and Bissonnet and Law Streets to the north. Viewed on a map, the city shape resembles a little house, with a "chimney" to the west side, and since it surrounds the city of Southside Place, a "door" is formed on the map surrounding Southside Place. (See map)

The Poor Farm Ditch is a ditch that drains into the Brays Bayou that formerly belonged to the Harris County poor farm. In 1928, the ditch was dredged after significant flooding had occurred in the area. On occasions, the ditch still flooded. The commissioners of the City of West University adjourned their meeting so they could dam streets in December 1935. The Harris County Flood Control District, in 1954, widened and deepened the ditch and added a concrete bottom and siding. During that year the district installed a chain link fence. To make the ditch more attractive, the Sunset Terrace Garden Club planted oleanders around the ditch; the oleanders obscure the view of the ditch from Edloe Street to the east. The West University Garden Club maintained the flowers. A 2001 Edloe Greenbelt proposal called for the removal of the flowers.

=== Cityscape ===
In 2018, Texas Monthly described West U as "an orderly quarter where older brick bungalows and modest two-story colonials reside in peace alongside grand—but not too grand—new construction. in 2018" The typical lot size in West University Place is 5,000 square feet (460 m^{2}).

The original housing stock of West University Place consisted of mid-20th century bungalows and cottages. Prior to 1992, the City of West University Place liberalized its development rules, allowing for new houses to be built in the city. As lot sizes were typically approximately 50 feet (15 m) by 120 feet (37 m), the houses constructed were Georgian houses described by Don Stowers of the Houston Post as "lot hugging." Because nearby Bellaire had larger, more inexpensive lots, many area home seekers began to consider Bellaire. In a 15-year period ending in 2002, around half of the existing houses in West University Place were torn down and replaced with newer houses.

There are a total of 26 subdivisions within West University: West University Place (First and Second), Belle Court, Bissonnet Place, Cambridge Place, College Court (part), College View (1st through 4th), Colonial Terrace, Cunningham Terrace, Evanston, Fairview, Kent Place, Krenzler Court, Matthews Place, Monticello, Pemberton, Pershing Place, Preston Place, Quenby Court, Rice Court, Sunset Terrace (part), Tangley Place, and Virginia Court. Rice Court is located north of University Boulevard and east of Buffalo Speedway. Pemberton is an area south of University Drive and east of Wakeforest Street. People living in the area were fond of restoration of older houses, and it includes some of West U's more expensive homes. Colonial Terrace is west of Weslayan Street and is near the railroad tracks.

== Demographics ==
Historical population
Census	Pop.	Note	%±
1930	1,322		—
1940	9,221		597.5%
1950	17,074		85.2%
1960	14,628		−14.3%
1970	13,317		−9.0%
1980	12,010		−9.8%
1990	12,920		7.6%
2000	14,211		10.0%
2010	14,787		4.1%
2020	14,955		1.1%
U.S. Decennial Census; 1850–1900 1910; 1920 1930 1940; 1950 1960 1970; 1980 1990 2000; 2010

=== Racial and ethnic composition ===
West University Place city, Texas – Racial and ethnic composition Note: the US Census treats Hispanic/Latino as an ethnic category. This table excludes Latinos from the racial categories and assigns them to a separate category. Hispanics/Latinos may be of any race.
Race / Ethnicity (NH = Non-Hispanic)	Pop 2000	Pop 2010	Pop 2020	% 2000	% 2010	% 2020
White alone (NH)	12,602	12,066	10,758	88.68%	81.60%	71.94%
Black or African American alone (NH)	64	114	120	0.45%	0.77%	0.80%
Native American or Alaska Native alone (NH)	9	27	23	0.06%	0.18%	0.15%
Asian alone (NH)	672	1,225	1,889	4.73%	8.28%	12.63%
Native Hawaiian or Pacific Islander alone (NH)	3	0	3	0.02%	0.00%	0.02%
Other race alone (NH)	22	47	50	0.15%	0.32%	0.33%
Mixed race or Multiracial (NH)	168	281	699	1.18%	1.90%	4.67%
Hispanic or Latino (any race)	671	1,027	1,413	4.72%	6.95%	9.45%
Total	14,211	14,787	14,955	100.00%	100.00%	100.00%

=== 2020 census ===
As of the 2020 census, West University Place had a population of 14,955. The median age was 41.6 years. 29.4% of residents were under the age of 18 and 17.3% of residents were 65 years of age or older. For every 100 females there were 95.3 males, and for every 100 females age 18 and over there were 91.5 males age 18 and over.

100.0% of residents lived in urban areas, while 0.0% lived in rural areas.

There were 5,043 households and 4,654 families in West University Place. Of the households, 46.5% had children under the age of 18 living in them. Of all households, 78.7% were married-couple households, 6.2% were households with a male householder and no spouse or partner present, and 13.4% were households with a female householder and no spouse or partner present. About 12.3% of all households were made up of individuals and 6.8% had someone living alone who was 65 years of age or older.

There were 5,308 housing units, of which 5.0% were vacant. The homeowner vacancy rate was 1.4% and the rental vacancy rate was 9.8%.

Racial composition as of the 2020 census
Race	Number	Percent
White	11,040	73.8%
Black or African American	127	0.8%
American Indian and Alaska Native	24	0.2%
Asian	1,898	12.7%
Native Hawaiian and Other Pacific Islander	6	0.0%
Some other race	184	1.2%
Two or more races	1,676	11.2%
Hispanic or Latino (of any race)	1,413	9.4%

=== 2010 census ===
At the 2010 U.S. census, there were 14,787 people, 5,260 households, and 4,264 families residing in the city. The population density was 7,393.5 inhabitants per square mile (2,854.6/km^{2}). There were 5,543 housing units at an average density of 2,771.5 per square mile (1,070.1/km^{2}).

In 2010, the racial makeup of the city was 90.6% White, 0.80% African American, 0.2% Native American, 8.4% Asian, 0.90% from other races, and 2.2% from two or more races. Hispanic or Latino of any race were 6.9% of the population.

There were 5,260 households, out of which 44.0% had children under the age of 18 living with them, 74.1% were married couples living together, 5.2% had a female householder with no husband present, and 18.9% were non-families. 15.9% of all households were made up of individuals, and 5.4% had someone living alone who was 65 years of age or older. The average household size was 2.81 and the average family size was 3.17.

In the city, the population was spread out, with 30.6% under the age of 18, 3.4% from 18 to 24, 22.1% from 25 to 44, 34.1% from 45 to 64, and 9.8% who were 65 years of age or older. The median age was 41.4 years. For every 100 females, there were 96.9 males.

The median income for a household in the city was $202,132, and the median income for a family was $227,425. Males had a median income of $168,056 versus $71,910 for females. About 1.4% of families and 2.0% of the population were below the poverty line, including 2.0% of those under age 18 and 2.9% of those age 65 or over.

As of 2018 many residents include lawyers and employees of the nearby institutions Rice University and the Texas Medical Center; that year Swartz described the community as "a prosperous place" that nevertheless is not "as flashy as wealthy neighborhoods like River Oaks or Memorial". In 2009 Claudia Feldman of the Houston Chronicle described West University Place as a "wealthy city inside a city" and "a tidy, orderly community, one where furniture matches, bills get paid and accomplished parents raise accomplished children." John Nova Lomax, a journalist, stated in a 2008 Houston Press article that, due to the growth and dominance of Houston, municipal enclaves with their own services, including West University Place, "are little more than glorified neighborhoods."

As of 2011, 85% of adults living in West University Place had bachelor's degrees, making it the community with the highest percentage of adults with bachelor's degrees in the Southern United States.

=== Religion ===
West University Baptist Church was established in 1928 by Nannie David; at the time the charter indicated 18 members. Beginning circa 2007 there was an attempt to swap land with the city government, but some residents protested as they feared eminent domain. In 2015 the attempt ended in failure after political rancor.

St. Andrews Presbyterian Church is in the city limits. In 2004 there were fewer than 600 members, and Sarah Williams of the West U Examiner described it as being "midsize".

St. George Orthodox Church moved to West University Place in September 1954. In 2012 it received mosaics made by a British artist, Aidan Hart.

The area Catholic church, St. Vincent de Paul, is in the Houston city limits. It was established in 1939 with the parish church being built from the following year. The Catholic church is a part of the Roman Catholic Archdiocese of Galveston-Houston.

== Government and infrastructure ==
=== Local government ===
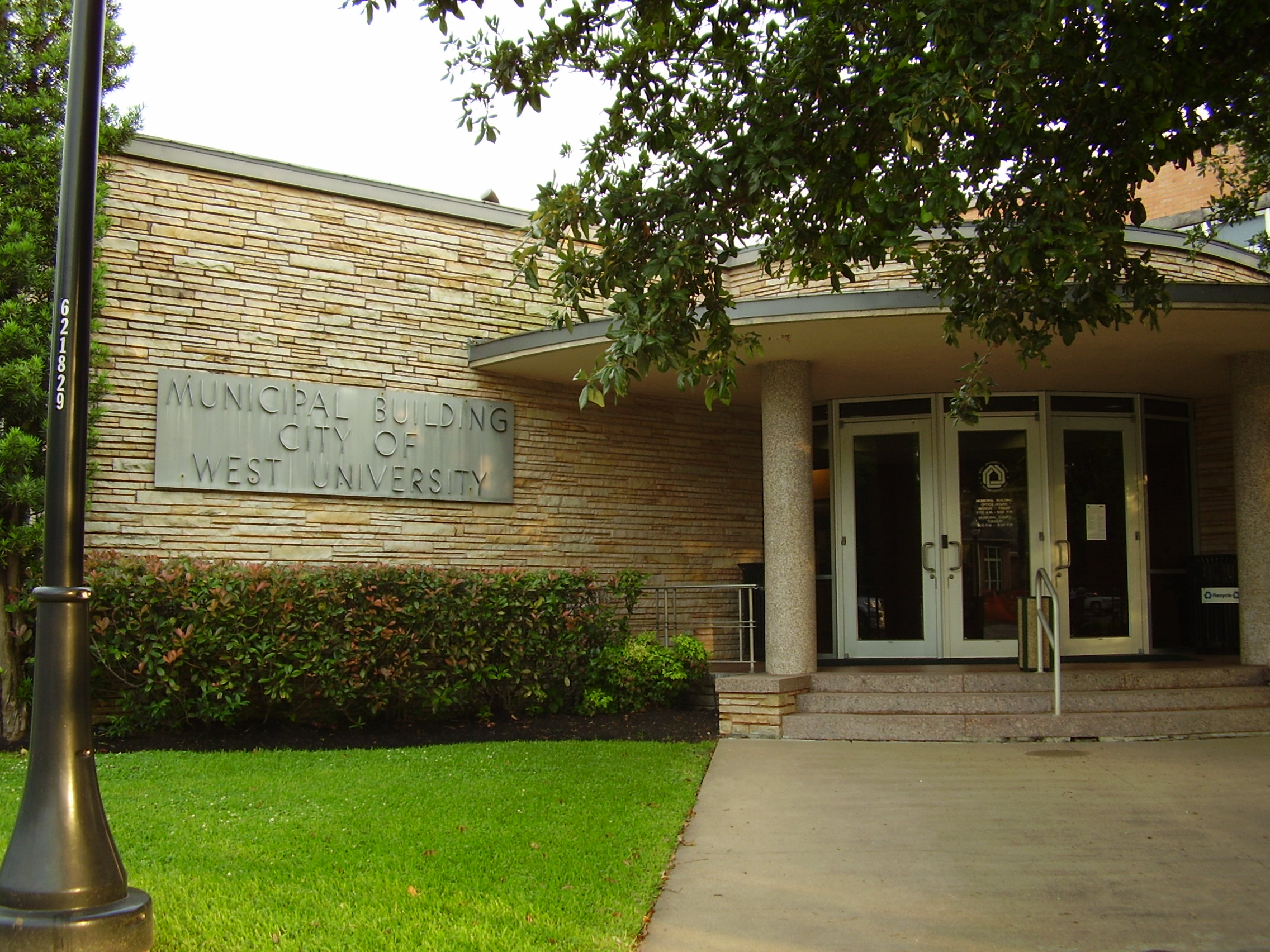
City hall

The city of West University Place operates under the Council-Manager form of government. The council contains the mayor and four city council members. The city council, elected on a non-partisan basis, is elected during the first Saturday in the May of every odd-numbered year. Each member serves a term of two years. Members may serve for not more than two successive terms in each office. The council enacts legislation, adopts budgets, establishes policies and appoints the city manager, city secretary, city municipal court judges, prosecutors, and clerks.

The City Council appoints the city manager to carry out the operations of the city. The city secretary maintains ordinances, resolutions, meeting minutes, and legally required publications. The city attorney gives the city council general counsel, litigation, contract review, and ordinance review. West University Place's sewage treatment plant and animal pound are located on a lot in Houston.

The West University Place Fire Department is headquartered at 3800 University Boulevard. Adam Ohler, a firefighter at the department, said in a 2009 Texas Monthly article that the pace of work in the department is "a lot slower than in other city stations—certainly slower than the Provo Fire Department, where I moved from, or some of Houston's units, whose guys run twenty to thirty calls a day." The West University Place Police Department is also now headquartered at 3800 University Boulevard following a large two-story addition completed in the summer of 2011. The old police department building was torn down and replaced with a large parking lot. In 2018 Swartz stated that "The police department is famous Houston-wide for enforcing speed limits with a vengeance."

There was a plan to sell the West University maintenance facility, but city council suspended the proposed sale in 2014.

==== Local politics ====
In 2001 Kathleen "Kathy" Ballanfant, the publisher and editor of the Village News and Southwest News, stated that "There's a long tradition in West University of not letting your partisan affiliation influence what happens. If you have committed your volunteer time in Little League and the city and various other things, it doesn't matter what political party you're in."

The city enforces a ban prohibiting drivers around West University Elementary School from talking on mobile phones during school zone hours. AT&T tried and failed to persuade the city to not apply the ban. The West University City Council voted 5–0 to establish the ban; a person who violates the ban gets a $500 fine. In 2008 the Houston Press rated this ban as the "Best New Ordinance".

In December 2009 the city voted to ban texting while driving. Bans of texting while driving were passed in West University Place and Bellaire within hours of one another.

In 2019 there was a proposal to reduce the number of hours in which landscapers were allowed to work, as a way of reducing noise, but it failed three to two.

=== County, state, and federal representation ===
Harris County Precinct One, headed by Allen Rosen as of 2019, serves West University Place.

West University Place is located in District 134 of the Texas House of Representatives. As of 2021 Ann Johnson (D) represents the district. West University Place is within District 17 of the Texas Senate, represented by Joan Huffman.

West University Place is in Texas's 7th congressional district; as of 2019 Lizzie Pannill Fletcher is the representative. The closest United States Postal Service office is the Weslayan Post Office at 5340 Weslayan Street, Houston, Texas, 77005-1048.

The United States Postal Service uses "Houston" as the city designation for all West University Place addresses.

Harris Health System designated Martin Luther King Health Center in southeast Houston for ZIP code 77005. The nearest public hospital is Ben Taub General Hospital in the Texas Medical Center.

== Parks and recreation ==
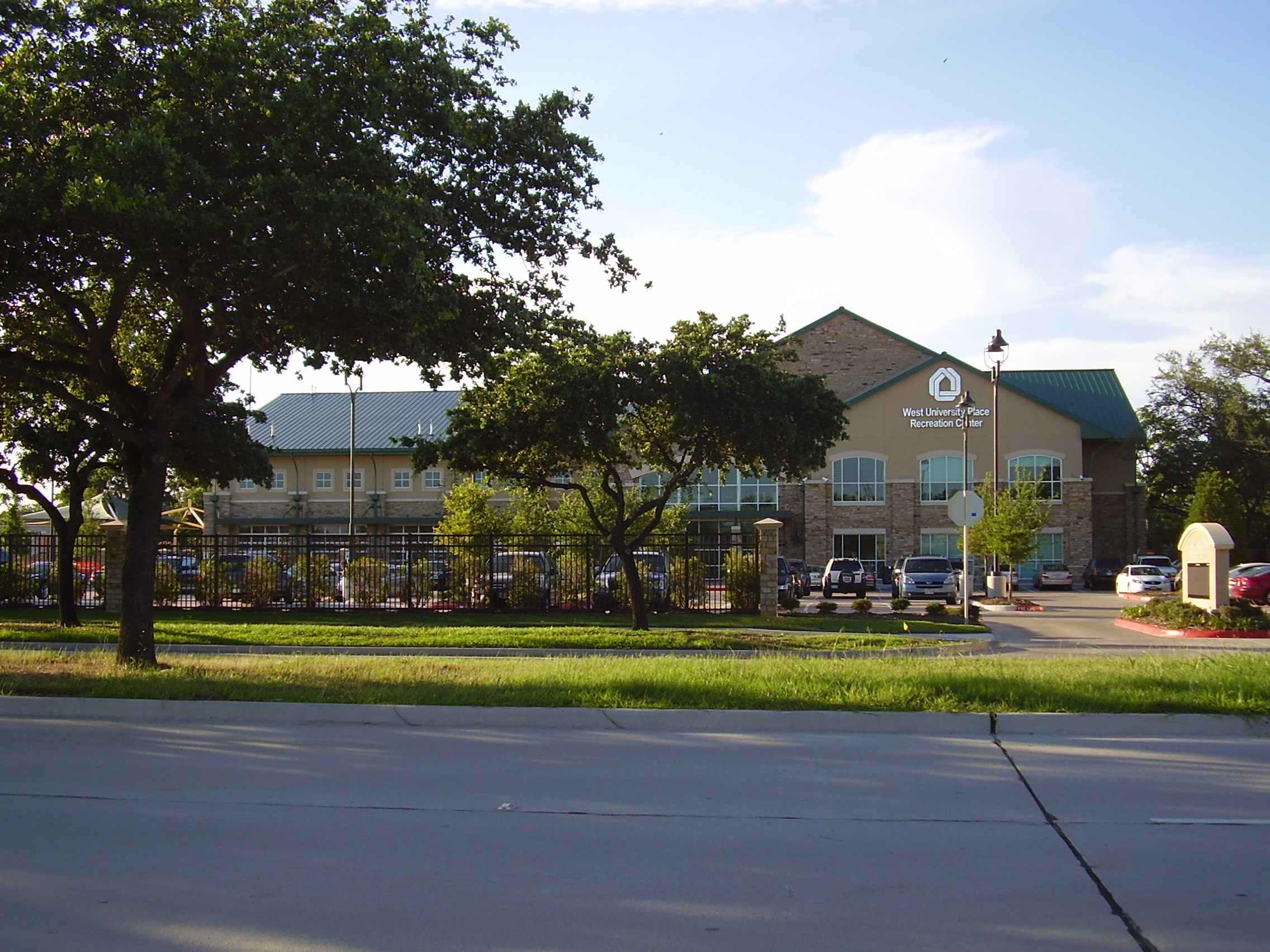
West University Place Recreation Center

In 2018 Swartz stated that the area recreational facilities had "secure, nontoxic equipment." From 1988 to 2003 the Friends of West University Place Parks Fund Inc., a volunteer board, and several West University-area businesses and residents raised $1.5 million to improve West University parks. The funds were collected to acquire additional green spaces and redevelop existing parks.

The first West University Place Recreation Center, formerly the Southwest YMCA, included a gymnasium, a swimming pool, and lighted sports fields. The City of West University had purchased the Southwest YMCA property around 2003. In 2008 residents approved a bond to build a new $8.8 million recreation center at a plot of land bounded by Bellaire Boulevard, Community, and Westpoint. The new recreation center does not have basketball courts; however, the center has a swimming pool, a weight room, a cardiovascular room, and racquetball courts. Additionally, classes such as yoga, jazzercize, and dance are offered for a fee. Russ Schulze, the chairperson of the Parks and Recreation department of West University Place, said that the city wants to construct a recreation center "for our residents, not something that will compete with nearby fitness centers or the Weekley YMCA, or to merely attract what residents outside West University want." Current policy denies admission to the pool or other facilities to non-residents unless physically accompanied by a resident at all times .

The Weekley YMCA in Houston, the current YMCA facility, includes West University Place in its service area. It opened in 1951 as the Southwest YMCA. The current facility in Braeswood Place, Houston broke ground in 2001.

Colonial Park, at 4130 Byron Street, has a park and a recreational center. The park has a playground, a picnic area, two tennis courts, a parkour course, a concrete walking path, and a pavilion. By 2003 Colonial Park had been enlarged and several facilities, such as a playground, pool, and tennis courts, had been added, due to efforts from the Friends of West University Place Parks and its allies. On May 11, 2009, the West University Place city council approved the design of the new Colonial Park pool, which was completed in 2011. Colonial Park Pool is open May through September, while the recreational center is open year-round.

Friends Park, formerly the Rice Pocket Park, is located at 3771 Rice Boulevard. The park, the newest in the city, opened on December 11, 2007. Huffington Park, located at 3901 Milton Street, has a playground, a shaded arbor, picnic tables, and game tables. Whitt Johnson Park, at 6540 Wakeforest Street, has a playground, a gazebo, a picnic area, and a lighted basketball court. Judson Park, at 4242 South Judson Street, has a playground, a picnic area, a lighted tennis court, and a concrete walking path. Wier Park, at 3012 Nottingham Street, has a playground, picnic tables, two lighted tennis courts, and a basketball court.

In 2002 West University's little league team was placed in the same league as the Bellaire team. Previously they played in separate leagues.

== Education ==
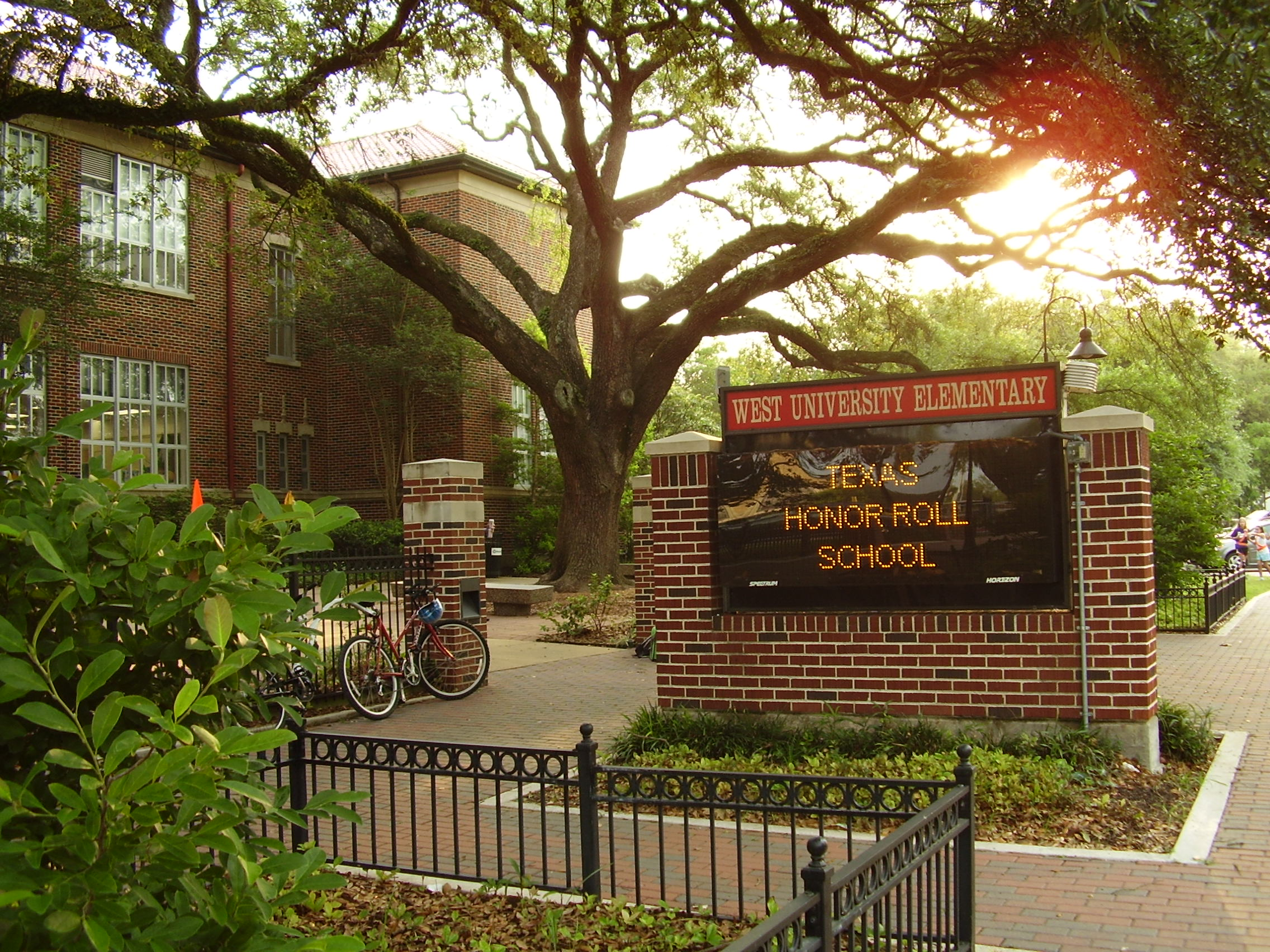
West University Elementary School

=== Primary and secondary schools ===
==== Public schools ====
The city is within the Houston Independent School District (HISD). In 2018 Swartz described the area schools as "well funded and well appointed."

Pupils who live in West University Place are zoned to West University Elementary School in West University Place, Pershing Middle School in the Braeswood Place neighborhood of Houston, and Lamar High School, in the Upper Kirby district of Houston. All pupils zoned to Pershing may attend Pin Oak Middle School (in the city of Bellaire) instead. Pin Oak was named a National Blue Ribbon School in 2008.

West University Elementary opened in 1925, although its permanent facility was not yet complete at the time; Platte School initially took its non-kindergarten students while the sales office of Southside Place housed kindergarten students. The permanent facility has a Spanish Renaissance architectural style and was financed by a $55,000 bond. The majority of the land that housed the school was donated by D. T. Austin and W. D. Haden. In the 1970s and 1980s West University parents reshaped West University Elementary, which Tim Fleck of the Houston Press described as "deteriorating", into "a community focal point that kept many West U children in public school through the fifth grade." West University Elementary School, by the 1990s, became what Fleck described as "the prototype of how the increasingly minority district could maintain the allegiance of affluent whites" and "a selling point for parents moving into the area." In 1996 37% of West University Elementary students had transferred there from other schools. In 2015 West U Elementary had 1,274 students, making it HISD's largest elementary school, with 96% of the students living inside the attendance zone.

As of 2010 about 600 students who were zoned to West University Elementary School were enrolled in Pin Oak Middle School or Lanier Middle School, opting for those schools instead of Pershing, their zoned school. In 2010 two parents, Adrienne Vanderbloemen and Christi Young, started a blog that supported the idea of sending one's child to Pershing Middle School.

West University Place is in close proximity to The Rice School, a kindergarten through 8th grade magnet school in Houston. The Rice School opened in August 1994 to relieve West University Elementary School and several nearby campuses.

==== Private schools ====
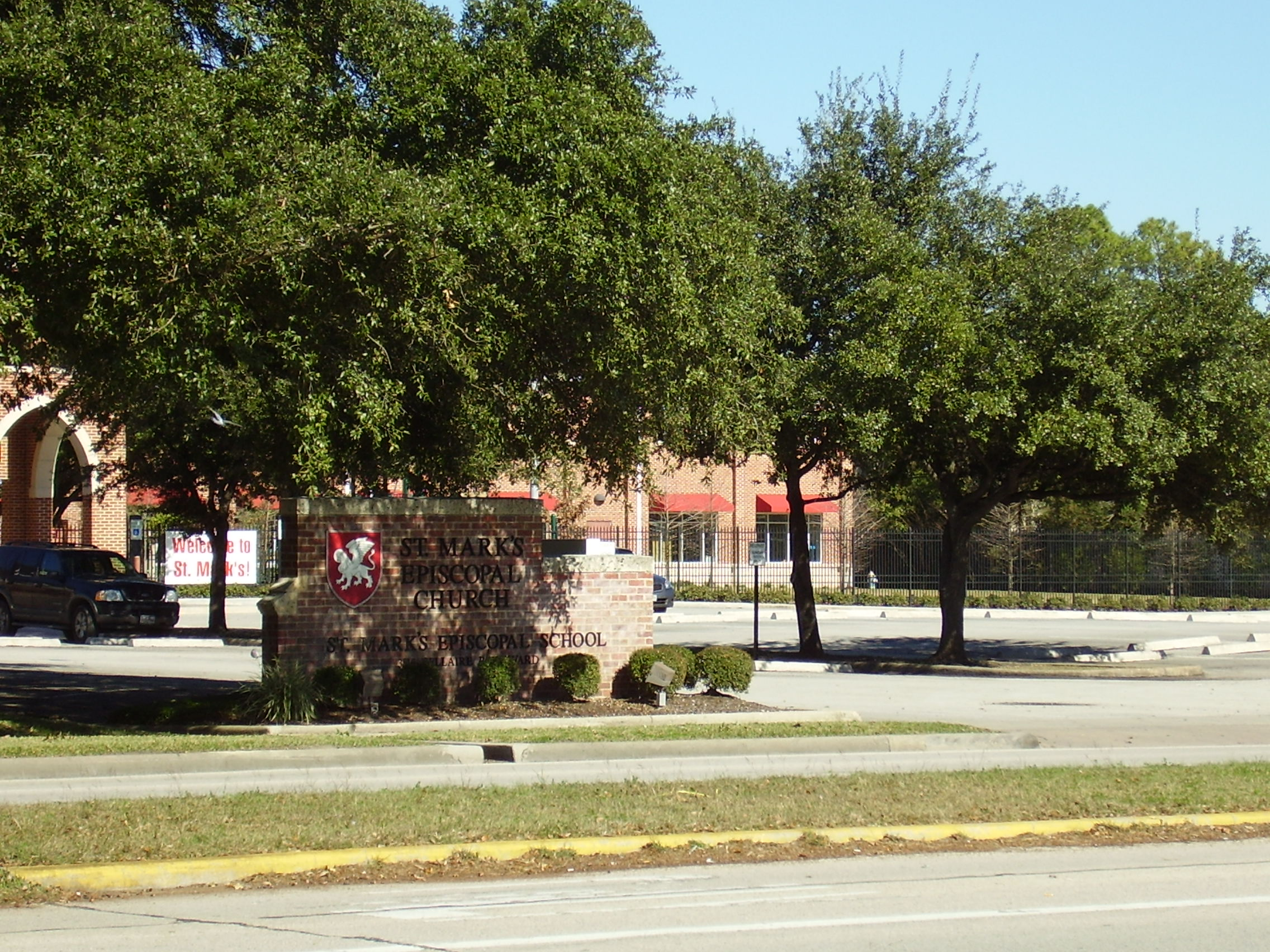
St. Mark's Episcopal School

St. Mark's Episcopal School (K–8) is located within West University Place. The Beehive Preschool Center is located at the West University Church of Christ.

Other nearby parochial schools and private schools include the School of St. Vincent De Paul Catholic Church in Houston (adjacent to the city limits), St. John's School in Houston, Episcopal High School in Bellaire, St. Francis Episcopal Day School (Texas) in Piney Point, and The Post Oak School with campuses in Bellaire and Houston. Local Catholic schools for girls include Incarnate Word Academy, St. Agnes Academy and Duchesne Academy, and are joined by the all-boys schools of Strake Jesuit and St. Thomas High School. As of 2019 The Village School in the Energy Corridor area has a bus service to an area along Westpark, via Royal Oaks Country Club. This stop serves students living in West University Place.

=== Colleges and universities ===
The Texas Legislature designated Houston Community College System (HCC) as serving Houston ISD (including West University Place). West University Place is also served by University of Houston and is in close proximity to Rice University.

=== Public libraries ===
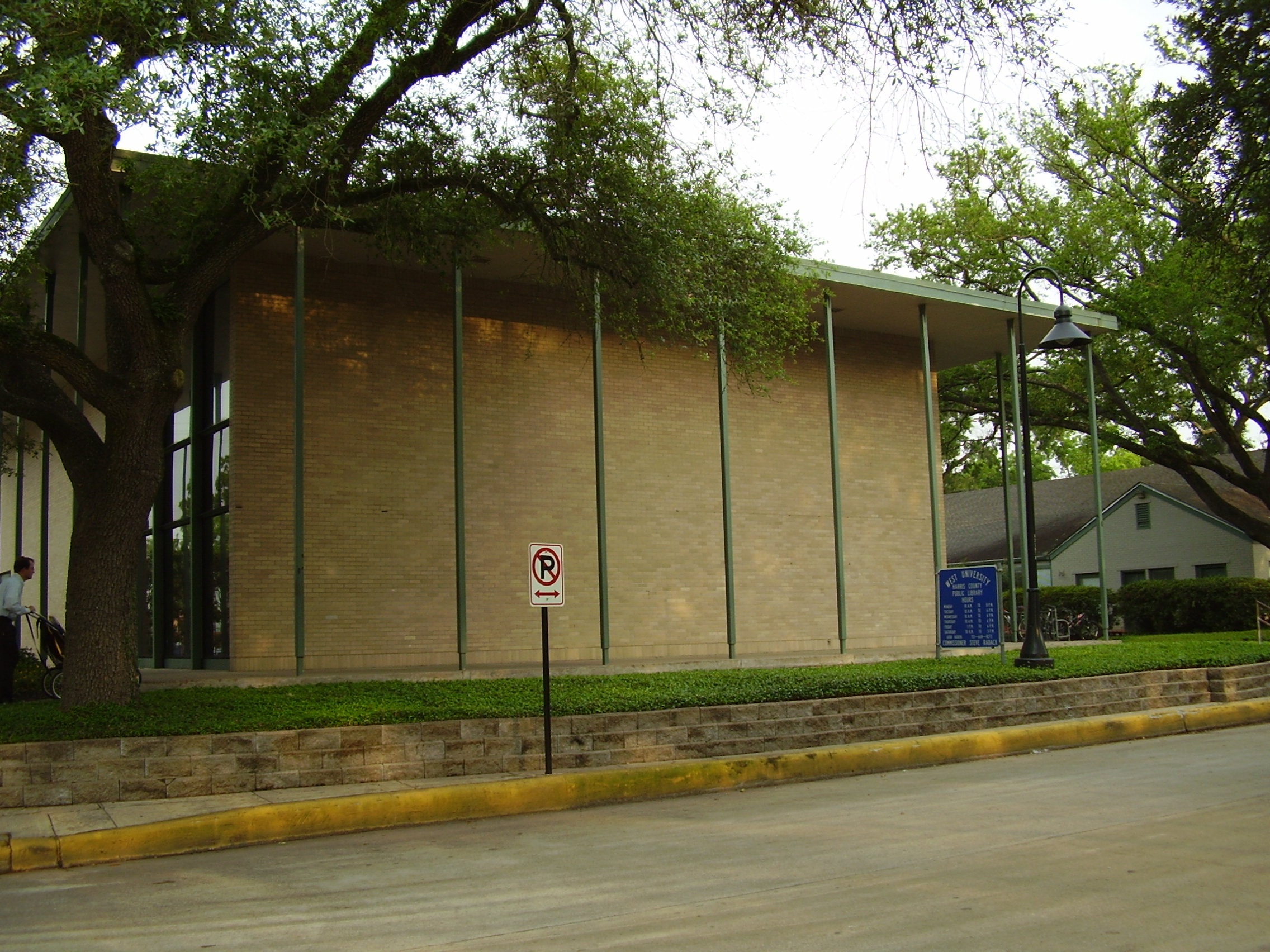
The Harris County Public Library West University Branch

The Harris County Public Library system operates the West University Branch Library in West University Place. The library opened in a section of the West University Community Center in 1942. As World War II continued the library was moved into the Reed and Yancey Realtors field office. After the war ended the library moved back into the community center. The current 6,100-square-foot (570 m^{2}) library facility opened in 1963.

== Media ==
The Houston Chronicle is the area regional newspaper. On Thursdays, residents receive the Bellaire/West U/River Oaks/Meyerland local section.

The West University Examiner is a local newspaper distributed in the community. The West University Buzz is a monthly publication about people, products and services in the community.

The Village News and Southwest News is a local newspaper distributed to houses and businesses in the community.

In the mid-20th century the community newspaper Southwestern Times served West U and surrounding communities. The paper was headquartered in Rice Village, and it served as an official publication for the city.

== Transportation ==
West University Place is a member city of the Metropolitan Transit Authority of Harris County, Texas (METRO). The city is served by bus lines 2 (Bellaire), 10 (Willowbend), 41 (Kirby/Polk), 65 (Bissonnet), 84 (Buffalo Speedway), and 402 (Bellaire Quickline).

== In culture ==
West University Place is the setting of the novel A Gracious Neighbor by Chris Cander.

== Notable people ==
- Craig Biggio, retired baseball player for the Astros
- Brian Cushing, former football player for the Houston Texans
- Rafael Espada, Vice President of Guatemala from 2008 to 2012
- Jeff Van Gundy, former NBA basketball coach
- Dylan Sprayberry, actor known for roles in Teen Wolf and Man of Steel
