= Examiner Newspaper Group =

U.S. newspapers owned by the Hearst Corporation

Examiner Newspaper Group, Inc.
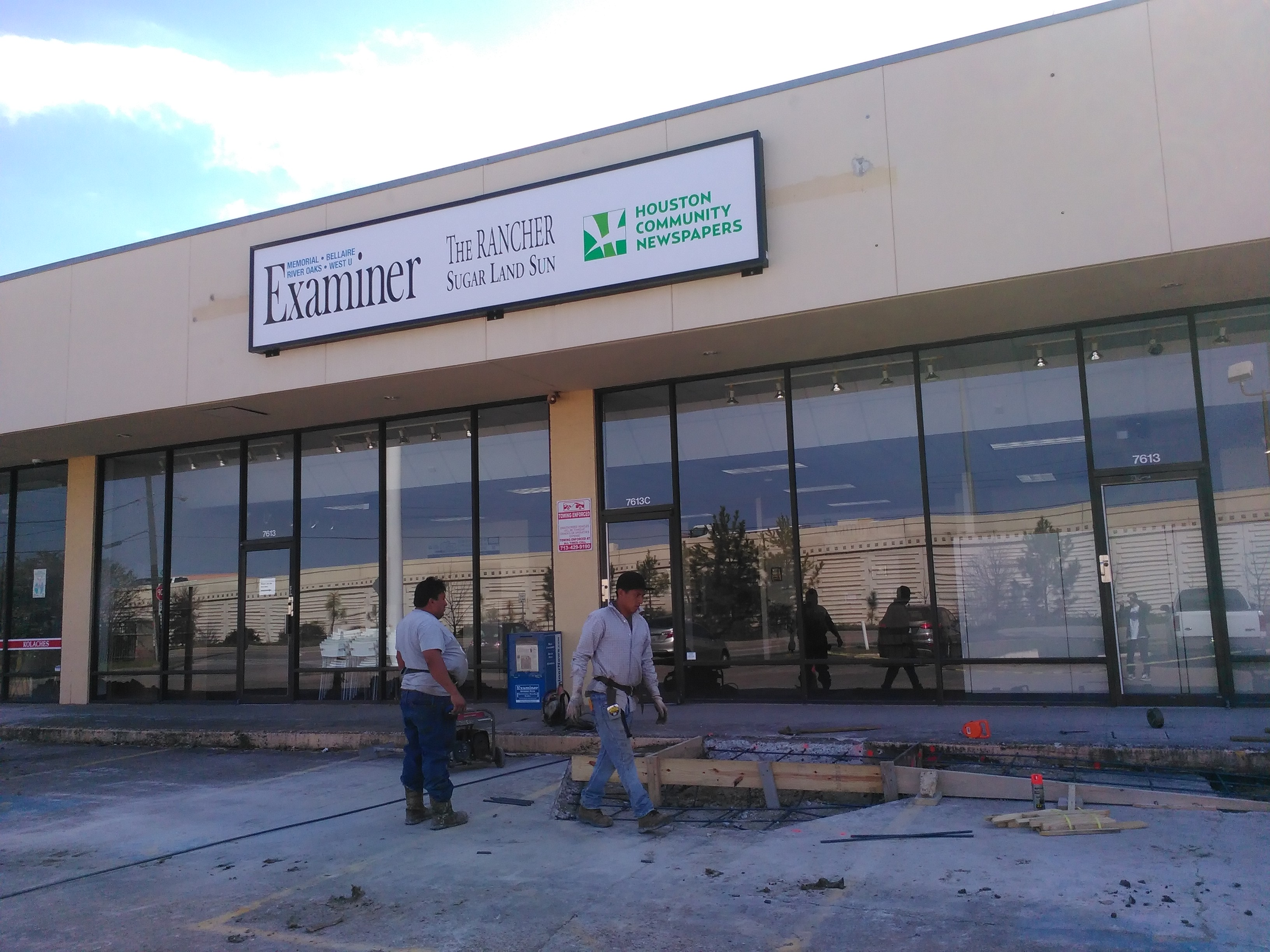
- Houston Community Newspapers Examiner Newspaper Group offices
- Parent company: Houston Chronicle
- Status: Active
- Founded: 2001; 24 years ago
- Founders: George Boehme and Edwin Henry
- Country of origin: United States
- Publication types: Bellaire Examiner, Memorial Examiner, River Oaks Examiner, and West University Examiner
- Nonfiction topics: Local news
- Owner: Hearst Corporation
- Official website: www.yourexaminernews.com

The Examiner Newspaper Group, Inc. consisted of a set of four community newspapers owned by the Hearst Corporation, doing business as Houston Community Newspapers (HCN). The publications include the Bellaire Examiner, Memorial Examiner, River Oaks Examiner, and West University Examiner. All four newspapers were headquartered in the HCN Southwest Office-Central facility in Houston.

The company was previously a separate entity headquartered in Rice Village, Houston. It was later acquired by ASP Westward and later 1013 Star Communications, before becoming a part of the Hearst Corporation in 2016.

== History ==
In 2001 George Boehme and Edwin Henry started the group, with Boehme as the publisher and Henry as the editor. The first publication from the group was the West University Examiner. The second one was the River Oaks Examiner, and the third publication, the Memorial Examiner, followed.

In 2004 the group won the "Best Community Newspaper Houston 2004" award from the Houston Press.

In 2006 George Boehme sold the Examiner Newspaper Group to ASP Westward, doing business as "Houston Community Newspapers", for $2.1 million. At the time, the purchase price was not disclosed.

In 2010 the Houston Press ranked the Examiner Newspaper Group division of the HCN the "Best Community Newspaper Houston 2010".

In 2012 1013 Star Communications acquired Houston Community Newspapers from ASP Westward.

In 2016 the Hearst Corporation acquired Houston Community Newspapers. It is the parent company of the Houston Chronicle. As part of the deal the Examiner papers became a part of the Hearst Corporation.

== See also ==
- Village News and Southwest News
