= Metro Rapid (disambiguation) =

Metro Rapid may refer to these bus services:

- CapMetro Rapid, Austin, Texas
- I-77 Bus Rapid Transit, Charlotte, North Carolina, alternately referred to as "MetroRAPID"
- METRORapid, a service of Houston Metro, Houston, Texas
  - METRORapid Silver Line
  - METRORapid University Line
- Metro Rapid, Los Angeles, California
- Metro Rapid, a service of Madison Metro Transit, Madison, Wisconsin
- MetroRapid, Tampa, Florida
