= Bellaire, Texas =

Enclave city in Texas, United States

City of Bellaire
- City
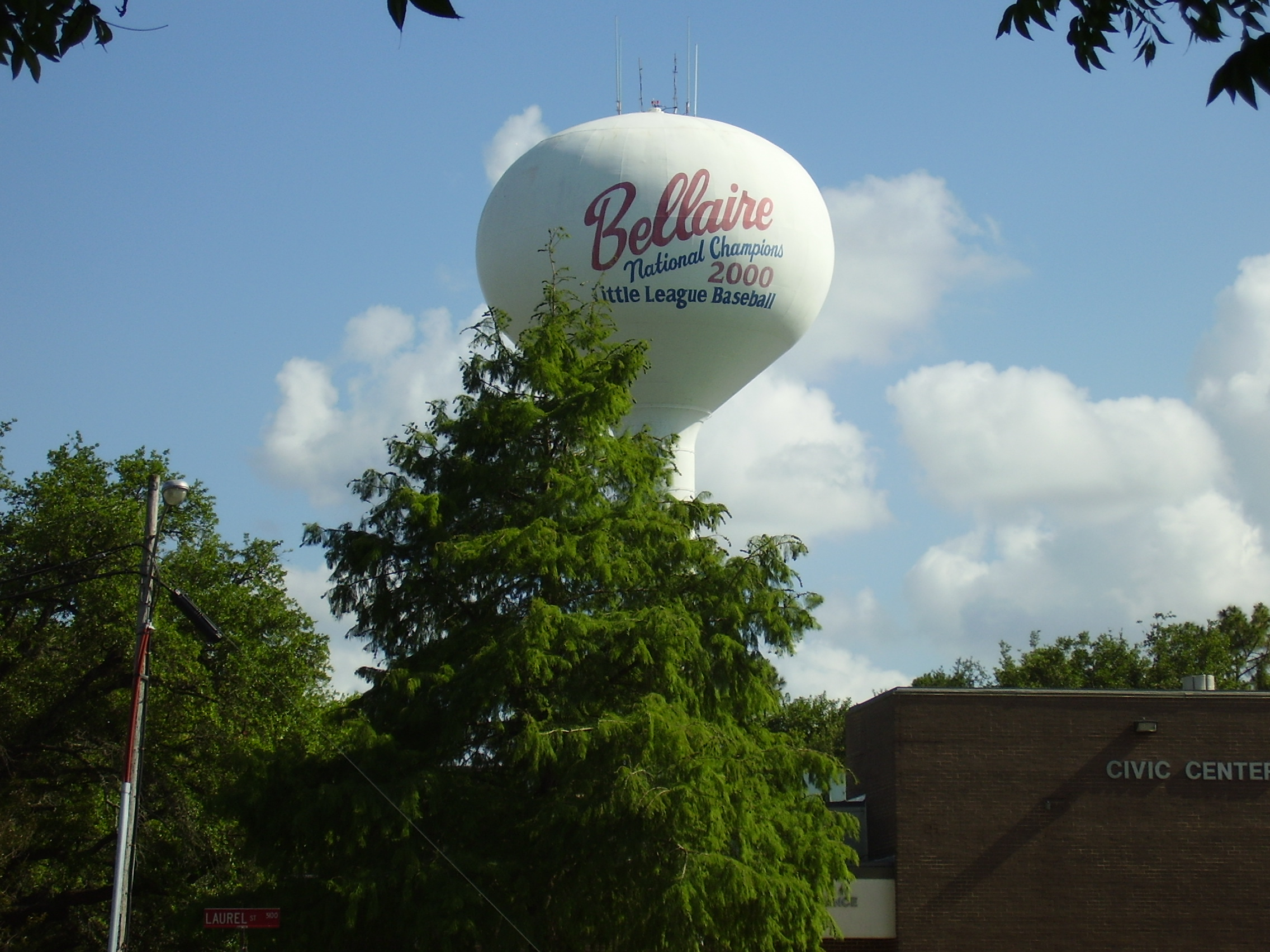
- The Bellaire water tower, commemorating the city's little league team
- Interactive map of City of Bellaire
- Coordinates: 29°42′12″N 95°28′6″W
- Country: United States
- State: Texas
- County: Harris
- Incorporated: June 24, 1918

Government
  - Mayor: Gus Pappas (elected in 2023)

Area
  - Total: 3.60 sq mi (9.32 km^{2})
  - Land: 3.60 sq mi (9.32 km^{2})
  - Water: 0 sq mi (0.00 km^{2})
- Elevation: 52 ft (16 m)

Population (2020)
  - Total: 17,202
  - Density: 5,274.4/sq mi (2,036.44/km^{2})
- Time zone: UTC-6 (CST)
  - Summer (DST): UTC-5 (CDT)
- ZIP codes: 77401-77402
- Area codes: 281, 346, 713, 832, 621
- FIPS code: 48-07300

Bellaire is a city in southwestern Harris County, Texas, United States, within the Houston–Pasadena–The Woodlands metropolitan area. As of the 2020 census, Bellaire had a population of 17,202. It is surrounded by the cities of Houston and West University Place. Bellaire is known as the "City of Homes", owing to its mostly residential character; but it has offices along the I-610 Loop within the city limits. Bellaire has two public elementary schools, one public middle school, one public high school, and one public library in the city limits, as well as three private K-12 schools. The municipality also has a bus transit center and multiple public bus routes; formerly it was on a streetcar line.

== History ==
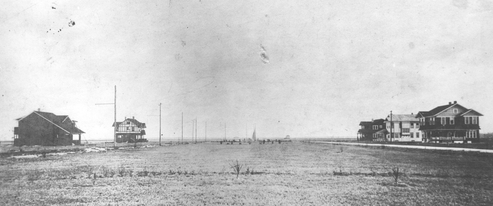
A photograph of Bellaire, dated 1911, from the Houston Post archives

Bellaire was founded in 1908 by William Wright Baldwin, who was the president of the South End Land Company. Baldwin, a native of Iowa, was well known as the vice president of the Burlington Railroad. Bellaire was created on what was part of William Marsh Rice's 9,449 acres (38.24 km^{2}) ranch. Baldwin surveyed the eastern 1,000 acres (4.0 km^{2}) of the ranch into small truck farms. He named them "Westmoreland Farms". Baldwin started Bellaire in the middle of "Westmoreland Farms" to serve as a residential neighborhood and an agricultural trading center. South End Land Company advertised to farmers in the Midwestern United States. Baldwin stated that the town was named "Bellaire", or "Good Air" for its breezes. Bellaire may have been named after Bellaire, Ohio, a town served by one of Baldwin's rail lines.

Six miles of prairie were a buffer zone between Houston and Bellaire. Originally, the town was bounded by Palmetto, First, Jessamine, and Sixth (now Ferris) Streets. In 1910, Edward Teas, a horticulturist, moved his nursery to Bellaire from Missouri so he could implement Sid Hare's landscaping plans. Bellaire was incorporated as a city with a general charter in 1918, 10 years after its founding. Bellaire had a population of 200 at the time. Because of the 1918 incorporation, Houston did not incorporate Bellaire's territory into its city limits, while annexing surrounding areas that were unincorporated.

Bellaire's population had reached 1,124 in 1940. After 1940, Bellaire had a rapid population explosion in the post-World War II building boom. On December 31, 1948, the city of Houston had annexed the land around the city of Bellaire, stopping the city of Bellaire's land growth. Bellaire remained independent of Houston, and adopted a home rule charter with a council-manager government in April 1949. By 1950, the city's residents had numbered 10,173, with 3,186 houses. Each subsequent year for the next two years, though, an additional 600 to 700 new houses were added. Due to the resulting population increase, several schools, including Bellaire High School, Marian High School, and two elementary schools, were established in that period, and Condit Elementary received a new addition. In the 1960s, 250 houses in Bellaire were demolished to make way for the right-of-way of the I-610 Loop, which bisected the city.

According to a Bellaire resident quoted in the Houston Post, prior to 1992, the tax base of the city of Bellaire had been decreasing. After neighbor West University Place eased restrictions on developers, new houses were constructed in West University Place, and the city gained a larger tax base. Bellaire decided to also liberalize its development restrictions to allow for new development by streamlining its no-growth building permit process. According to Karl Lewis, a vice president and sales manager at John Daugherty Realtors, when the prices of West University Place land reached about $20/sq ft, area home buyers began to consider Bellaire, which had an average price of $10–12/sq ft. Don Stowers of the Houston Press said that Bellaire and West University Place had "comparable" attributes such as independent fire and police departments, zoning, recreation facilities and parks, and schools "among the best in Houston." Michael Blum, president of Blum & Associates Realty, said "Bellaire is a bargain." Blum added that Bellaire was affordable compared to similar American neighborhoods and that Bellaire had proximity to business districts, "excellent" municipal services, and "superior" schools. Affluent families increasingly moved to Bellaire. The price of an average house in Bellaire increased from $75,000 to $500,000 from 1986 to 2006.

In 2002, the City of Bellaire attempted to acquire all or part of the 10 acres (4.0 ha) Teas Nursery, Bellaire's oldest business and the oldest nursery in Greater Houston, for park development. The company fought the city's take-over attempt. During that year the owners of Teas sold 5 acres (2.0 ha) at the rear of the property to Lovett Homes, a home developer. Frank Liu, the owner of Lovett Homes, said that it had an option to buy the remaining 5 acres (20,000 m^{2}). When the City of Bellaire denied a replat application sent by Teas Nursery, in June 2002 the nursery filed a lawsuit against the city and its zoning commission. In 2005 the lawsuit was settled out of court.

During the Hurricane Rita evacuation, a bus filled with residents from Brighton Gardens, a nursing home in Bellaire, caught on fire and exploded in the city of Wilmer. The September 23, 2005, explosion killed 24 of the 38 residents and employees on the bus. The resulting lawsuit was settled in June 2009. On March 23, 2008, a tour bus carrying Tejano singer Emilio Navaira crashed in Bellaire. By 2008, an increasing number of houses sold for over $1,000,000.

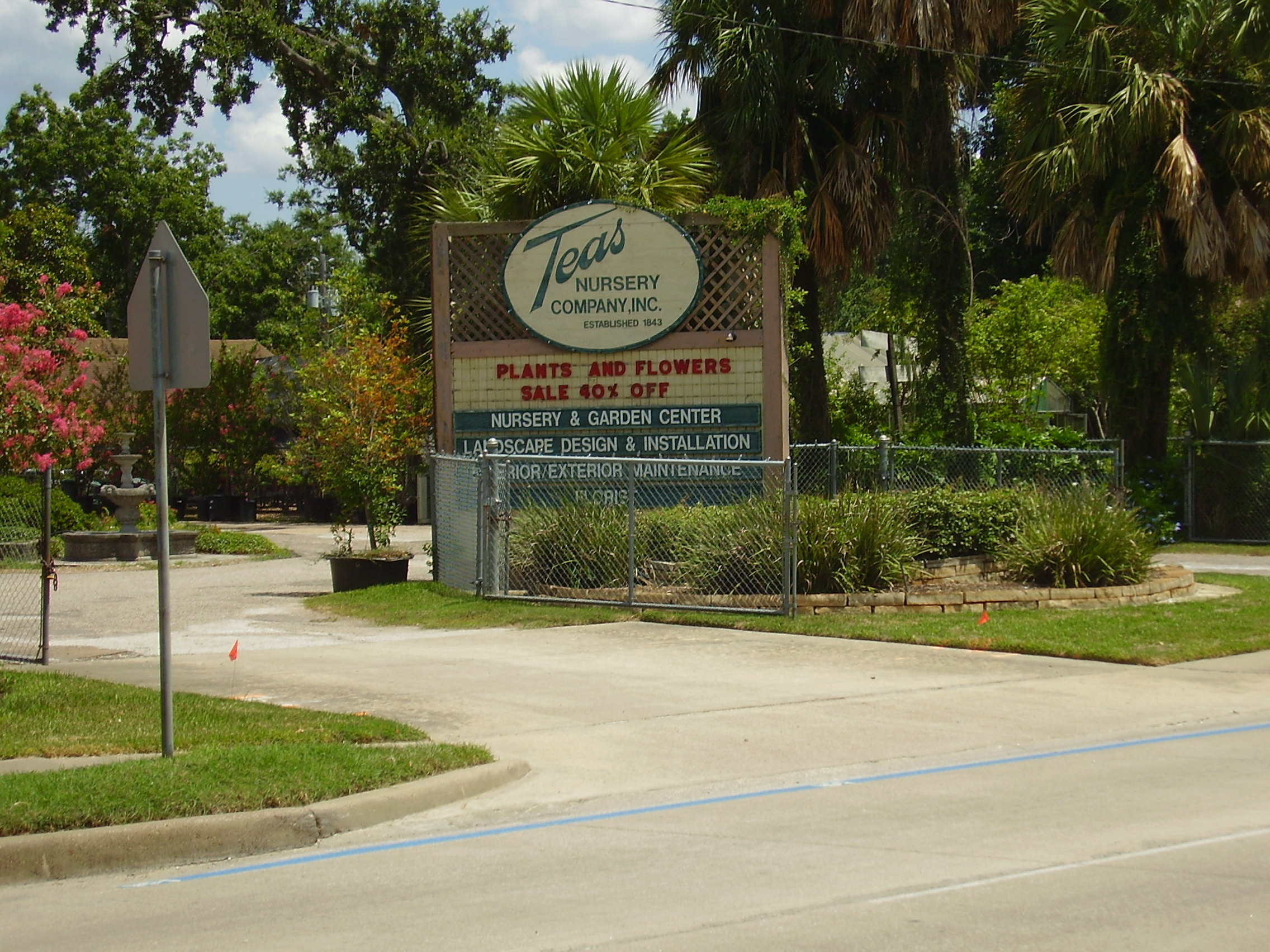
Teas Nursery, which was started by horticulturist Edward Teas. It was closed in 2010, later to become a park.

On December 31, 2008, Bellaire police officers confronted Robbie Tolan, the son of former Major League Baseball player Bobby Tolan, in the driveway of his house at the 800 block of Woodstock. Officers suspected Tolan, who was unarmed, of stealing a sports utility vehicle in the driveway and shot Tolan in the chest; Tolan's family owned the vehicle. Tolan was hospitalized with injuries to one lung and his liver. The incident sparked allegations of racial profiling. Members of minority groups reported that Bellaire police racially profiled people. In 2002, José Cruz Jr., son of baseball player José Cruz, was stopped since his vehicle was missing a front license plate. He was arrested by Bellaire police and spent one night in jail after Bellaire law enforcement told him that he had a warrant for his arrest. The Houston Chronicle said that the Bellaire police decision to arrest Cruz was a mistake. In January 2009, Cruz accused the police of racial profiling. Mayor Cindy Siegel said that she was unaware of racial profiling by police. Siegel announced that the city would investigate racial profiling and hire an independent consultant to look at traffic stop data. The local National Association for the Advancement of Colored People (NAACP) branch said that it had established a pact with the City of Bellaire; people may report civil rights violations from Bellaire Police to the branch if they do not wish to contact the City of Bellaire. However, the NAACP branch has not yet provided the city with any civil rights violations.

On April 6, 2009, a Harris County grand jury indicted Sergeant Jeffrey Cotton, the police officer, for aggravated assault by a public servant. If convicted, Cotton could face up to life in prison. In addition, the family sued the police department and the police officer. The trial in Harris County District Court on criminal felony charges against Cotton began on January 25, 2010. Jury selection was scheduled to begin on May 3, 2010. The officer was found not guilty in his criminal trial in May 2010.

Teas Nursery closed in 2010; the company president, Tom Teas, intended for the property to be redeveloped into single-family houses. The Teas Nursery business was either going to move to a new location or be liquidated. In December the Rubenstein family bought the Teas property; the family planned to donate it to the City of Bellaire for community purposes. The Teas property has two historic buildings. Scott Rubenstein, who handled negotiations for the Rubenstein family, described the Teas lot as "the last largely undeveloped tract in the city, and frankly, in the inner loop of the city of Houston where you can do something that can be used by people from all around the city." Mayor of Bellaire Cindy Seigel said, "I am just thrilled we'll be able to preserve a historical property that is an important piece of Bellaire's history."

In January 2010, Siegel announced that she would oppose a plan to locate a permanent, privately funded Houston Dynamo stadium at the intersection of South Rice and Westpark, near Bellaire. In April 2010, the Dynamo stadium, now known as BBVA Compass Stadium, was announced as being built in East Downtown Houston.

Andrew Friedberg became the mayor in November 2015 and remained in his position after a 2019 election.

In August 2017, the city was affected by Hurricane Harvey.

As of July 31, 2020, during the COVID-19 pandemic in Texas, 78 people were confirmed to have had the disease; at that time, no Bellaire residents had died from it. Ryan Nickerson of the Houston Chronicle stated that "local officials" credited the lower population density and the relative wealth of Bellaire residents. The first COVID deaths in the city occurred by March 2021.

== Geography and climate ==
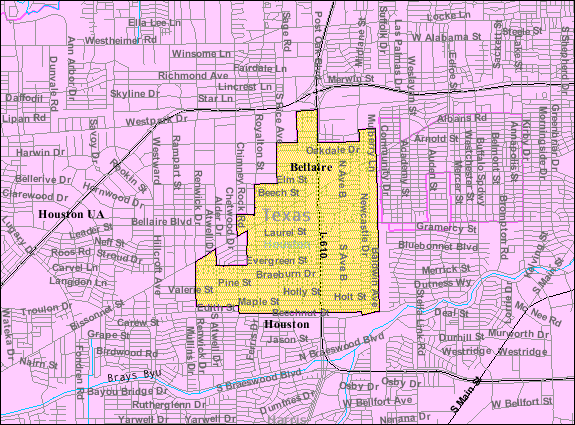
Map of Bellaire

Bellaire is located at 29°42′12″N 95°28′6″W. According to the United States Census Bureau, the city has a total area of 3.6 sq mi (9.3 km^{2}), all land. The city is surrounded by Houston, West University Place, and Southside Place.

Climate data for Bellaire, Texas
Month	Jan	Feb	Mar	Apr	May	Jun	Jul	Aug	Sep	Oct	Nov	Dec	Year
Mean daily maximum °F (°C)	62 (17)	66 (19)	72 (22)	79 (26)	86 (30)	91 (33)	94 (34)	94 (34)	89 (32)	82 (28)	72 (22)	64 (18)	79 (26)
Mean daily minimum °F (°C)	42 (6)	45 (7)	51 (11)	58 (14)	66 (19)	72 (22)	74 (23)	74 (23)	69 (21)	60 (16)	51 (11)	43 (6)	59 (15)
Average precipitation inches (mm)	4.06 (103)	2.98 (76)	3.24 (82)	3.48 (88)	4.69 (119)	5.51 (140)	3.30 (84)	4.29 (109)	5.82 (148)	4.03 (102)	4.58 (116)	3.36 (85)	49.34 (1,252)
Source: Weather.com

=== Cityscape ===
Bellaire's housing lots are 75 feet (23 m) by 130 feet (40 m), allowing for houses larger than those that could be built on typical 50 feet (15 m) by 120 feet (37 m) West University Place lots. A Bellaire lot can accommodate a house with a detached garage and a swimming pool, while the typical West University Place lot could accommodate a newly constructed Georgian house described by Don Stowers of the Houston Post as "lot-hugging". The more spacious and inexpensive housing lots prompted area home seekers to consider Bellaire.

The original Bellaire housing stock typically consisted of three-bedroom, one-bathroom, post-World War II houses described by Stowers as "smallish". Because of the attributes, developers did not hesitate to tear these houses down and build new houses. Some individuals chose to renovate their houses instead of having them torn down. Many individuals who would otherwise renovate the houses reconsidered their decisions as the land value increased. In some cases, the land value was higher than the value of the structure on the lot. Some subdivisions had larger houses, particularly the Carroll subdivision south of Bellaire Boulevard and the Braeburn Country Club Estates subdivision between Chimney Rock and Rice. Many of the houses in those subdivisions were built in the 1950s and early 1960s, and many were on .5 acres (0.20 ha) lots. Karl Lewis, the vice president and sales manager of John Daugherty Realtors, said that many of the houses were "still quite attractive" and "similar to the large Tanglewood homes." In 1992 smaller lots in Bellaire were about $50,000 (equivalent to $100,000 in 2024) and up, while larger lots were $300,000 to $500,000 (equivalent to between $600,000 and $1 million in 2024).

In a 2007 Houston Press article John Nova Lomax, a journalist, said that parts of Bellaire's downtown had "a certain raffish 1950s charm – the Bellaire Broiler Burger, for example – but it's boring." Lomax stated in a 2008 Houston Press article that, due to the growth and dominance of Houston, municipal enclaves with their own services, including Bellaire, "are little more than glorified neighborhoods."

Many Bellaire streets, such as "Holly," "Holt," "Maple," and "Pine," are named after trees. The word "Holt" means a small grove or a forest of trees.

One community in Bellaire, Southdale, was developed by William G. Farmington, the developer of Tanglewood. Southdale was originally developed in the late 1940s with two-bedroom houses. The houses were marketed to World War II veterans. The houses were about a fourth as expensive as Tanglewood houses, around $25,000 each (equivalent to $260,000 in 2024). Another subdivision in Bellaire is named "Broad Acres."

== Demographics ==
Historical population
Census	Pop.	Note	%±
1930	390		—
1940	1,124		188.2%
1950	10,173		805.1%
1960	19,872		95.3%
1970	19,009		−4.3%
1980	14,950		−21.4%
1990	13,842		−7.4%
2000	15,642		13.0%
2010	16,855		7.8%
2020	17,202		2.1%
U.S. Decennial Census; 1850–1900 1910; 1920 1930 1940; 1950 1960 1970; 1980 1990 2000; 2010

=== Racial and ethnic composition ===
Bellaire city, Texas – Racial and ethnic composition Note: the US Census treats Hispanic/Latino as an ethnic category. This table excludes Latinos from the racial categories and assigns them to a separate category. Hispanics/Latinos may be of any race.
Race / Ethnicity (NH = Non-Hispanic)	Pop 2000	Pop 2010	Pop 2020	% 2000	% 2010	% 2020
White alone (NH)	13,041	12,242	10,188	83.37%	72.63%	59.23%
Black or African American alone (NH)	130	274	281	0.83%	1.63%	1.63%
Native American or Alaska Native alone (NH)	39	23	28	0.25%	0.14%	0.16%
Asian alone (NH)	993	2,374	4,072	6.35%	14.08%	23.67%
Native Hawaiian or Pacific Islander alone (NH)	10	1	9	0.06%	0.01%	0.05%
Other race alone (NH)	12	44	90	0.08%	0.26%	0.52%
Mixed race or Multiracial (NH)	196	302	704	1.25%	1.79%	4.09%
Hispanic or Latino (any race)	1,221	1,595	1,830	7.81%	9.46%	10.64%
Total	15,642	16,855	17,202	100.00%	100.00%	100.00%

=== 2020 census ===
As of the 2020 census, Bellaire had a population of 17,202, with 5,847 households and 5,627 families residing in the city. The median age was 43.2 years, 27.4% of residents were under the age of 18 and 16.7% were 65 years of age or older. For every 100 females there were 95.1 males, and for every 100 females age 18 and over there were 93.3 males age 18 and over.

100.0% of residents lived in urban areas, while 0% lived in rural areas.

There were 5,847 households in Bellaire, of which 43.6% had children under the age of 18 living in them. Of all households, 73.1% were married-couple households, 8.9% were households with a male householder and no spouse or partner present, and 15.7% were households with a female householder and no spouse or partner present. About 15.2% of all households were made up of individuals and 9.2% had someone living alone who was 65 years of age or older.

There were 6,325 housing units, of which 7.6% were vacant. Among occupied housing units, 88.0% were owner-occupied and 12.0% were renter-occupied. The homeowner vacancy rate was 2.4% and the rental vacancy rate was 13.6%.

=== 2019 American Community Survey ===
The 2019 American Community Survey determined the average household size was 2.78 people in the city. Around 2020, the median household income was $201,629, and the average life expectancy was 87.4. The city's population had a per capita income of $101,097 in 2019 and 2.3% of the population lived at or below the poverty line.

=== Religion ===
Holy Ghost Church of the Roman Catholic Archdiocese of Galveston-Houston is in the Houston city limits, one city block away from Bellaire. In 2006, it had about 4,000 regular parishioners. It holds services in both English and Spanish, with three masses per language each week. In 2006, the pastor was bilingual in English and Spanish. A group of volunteers created stained-glass windows that were put in the church by 2008; the project began around 1983.

Bellaire also has St. Mark Coptic Orthodox Church, one of three Coptic Orthodox churches in the Houston area.

== Government and infrastructure ==
=== Local government ===
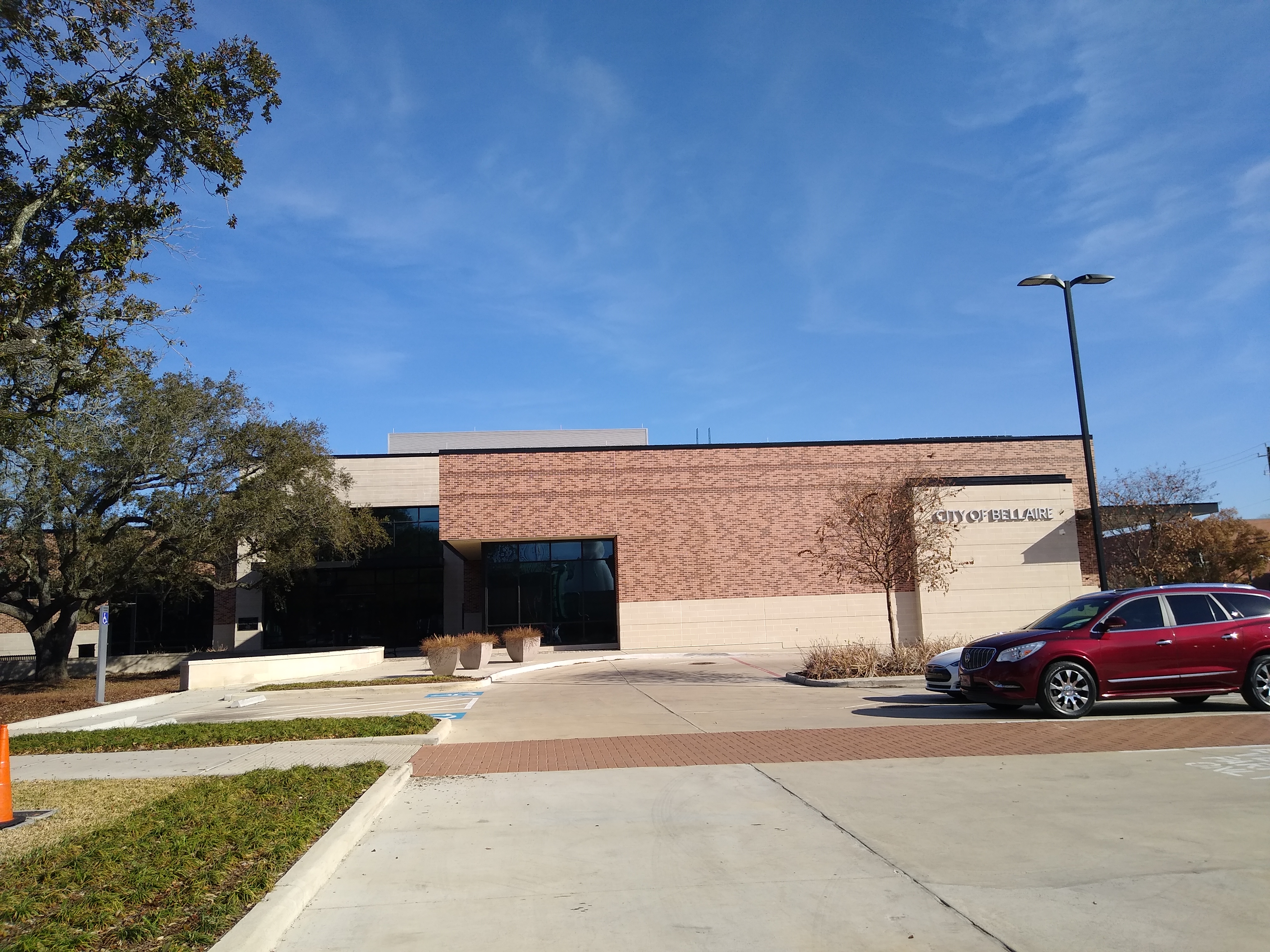
Bellaire City Hall

Bellaire currently has a city manager style of government. The home-rule government was established on April 2, 1949, replacing the general law form of government. The city council is made up of the mayor and six city council members. All are elected at large. The mayor is elected for two-year terms, while each city council member is elected for four-year terms. The mayor may not serve for more than four terms in that position. A city council member may have no more than two terms. Bellaire has zoning ordinances that dictate types of structures and uses throughout sections of the city. City hall is located on blocks 31 and 32 of the original Bellaire town site.

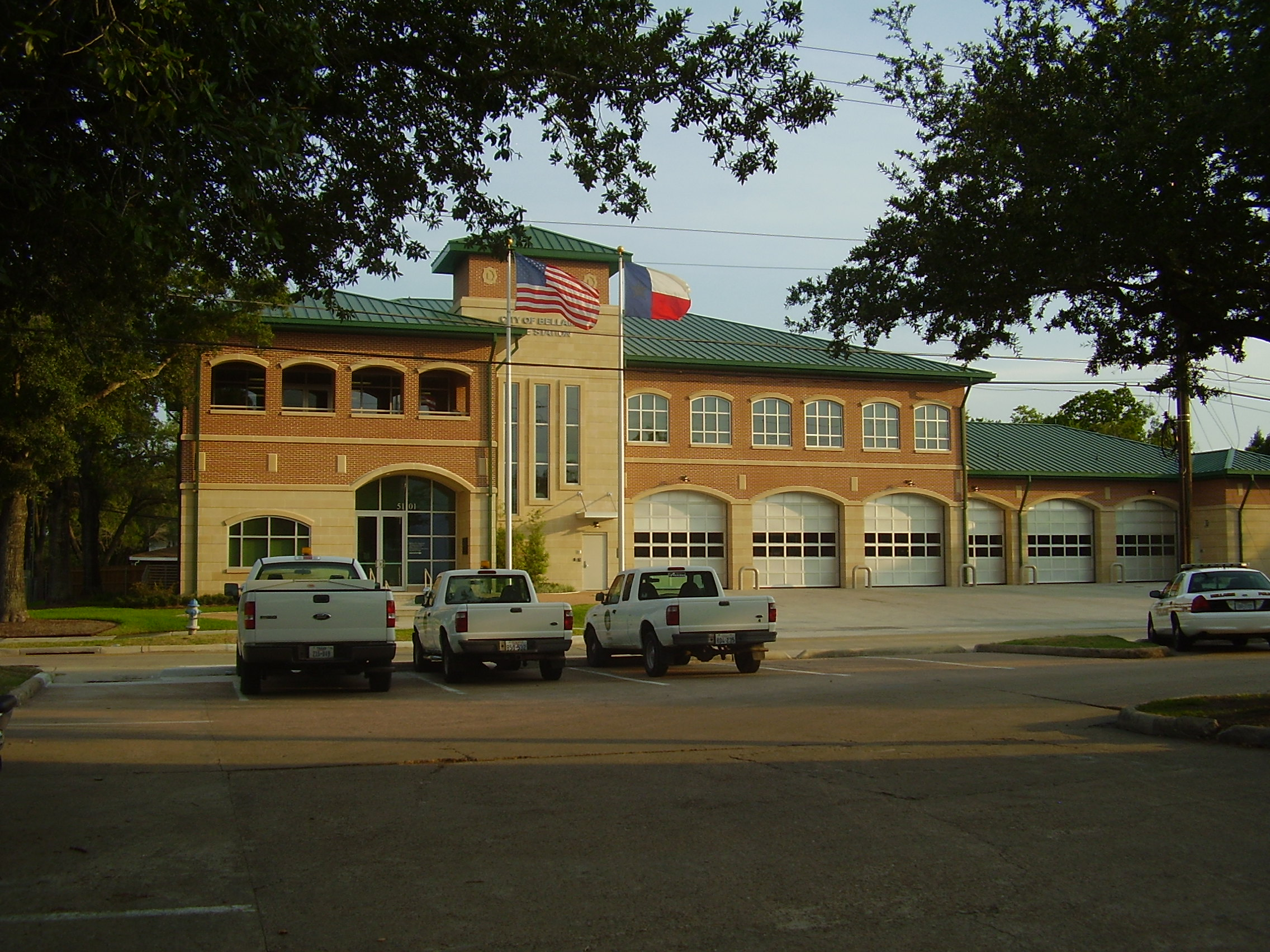
City of Bellaire Fire Station

The Bellaire Fire Department is housed at 5101 Jessamine Street. The fire station includes two fire engines (a main engine and a volunteer/backup engine), two medic units (a main medic unit and a backup unit), an on shift commander vehicle, a vehicle for each the chief and assistant chief, a cascade unit, and a hazardous materials trailer. The fire department operates the Citizens Fire Academy, a fire and life safety program for Bellaire citizens held on Wednesdays and Saturdays. The old fire station was demolished on December 4, 2009, with demolition continuing on Monday December 7, 2009, and operations are temporarily relocated at the Chevron building. A new fire station was scheduled to be built in the location of the previous fire station. The groundbreaking for the new station was held on December 17, 2009.

The Bellaire Police Department is housed at 5110 Jessamine Street. As of 2008 the Chief of Police is Byron Holloway. The police department's patrol division, the organization's largest division, includes patrol, detention, motorcycle, and bicycle units. The support services division includes court, records, and communications divisions. The police department offers the "House Watch Program," where interested residents allow police to check their houses while they are away on vacation. Voters approved the creation of a new emergency medical services unit in a 2019 election.

==== Local politics ====
Zoning and land use controversies, common throughout Bellaire's history, resulted in the 1977 recall of the mayor and three council members. The City of Bellaire voted against banning smoking in bars and restaurants on Monday January 15, 2007. Mayor Cindy Siegel and Pat McLaughlan, one council member, voted for the ban, while the other five members, including Peggy Faulk, voted against the ban. The National Restaurant Association asked Bellaire to consider adopting a smoking ban to put it in sync with the City of Houston, which adopted a similar ordinance in 2005. In December 2009 the city voted to ban texting while driving. Bans of texting while driving were passed in Bellaire and West University Place, Texas within hours of one another. In 2010 the city voted 5–2 to ban the feeding of cats on public property and establish a rule requiring the permission of the owner of a piece of private property in order to feed cats on private property. The city received negative e-mail feedback from various locations, including Switzerland.

In 2011, Phil Nauert was elected as the new mayor of Bellaire. In 2014, long-time City Manager Bernie Satterwhite retired and was replaced by Paul Hofmann.

In 2011, Bellaire High School principal Tim Salem attempted to remove the Bellaire city government's operating license of a food cart vendor who was popular with students.

=== County, state, and federal government ===
Bellaire is within Harris County Precinct 3. As of 2008, Steve Radack serves as the commissioner of that precinct. It is in Constable Precinct One. As of 2008 Jack Abercia heads the constable precinct.

Harris Health System (formerly Harris County Hospital District) operates the nearest public health clinic, Valbona Health Center (formerly People's Health Center) in Greater Sharpstown, and the nearest public hospital is Ben Taub General Hospital in the Texas Medical Center.

Bellaire is located in District 134 of the Texas House of Representatives. As of 2011, Sarah Davis represents the district. Bellaire is within District 17 of the Texas Senate.

Bellaire is in Texas's 7th congressional district; as of 2018, Lizzie Fletcher is the representative. The designated United States Postal Service office is the Bellaire Post Office along Bellaire Boulevard in Bellaire. Bellaire first received a post office in 1911.

== Economy ==
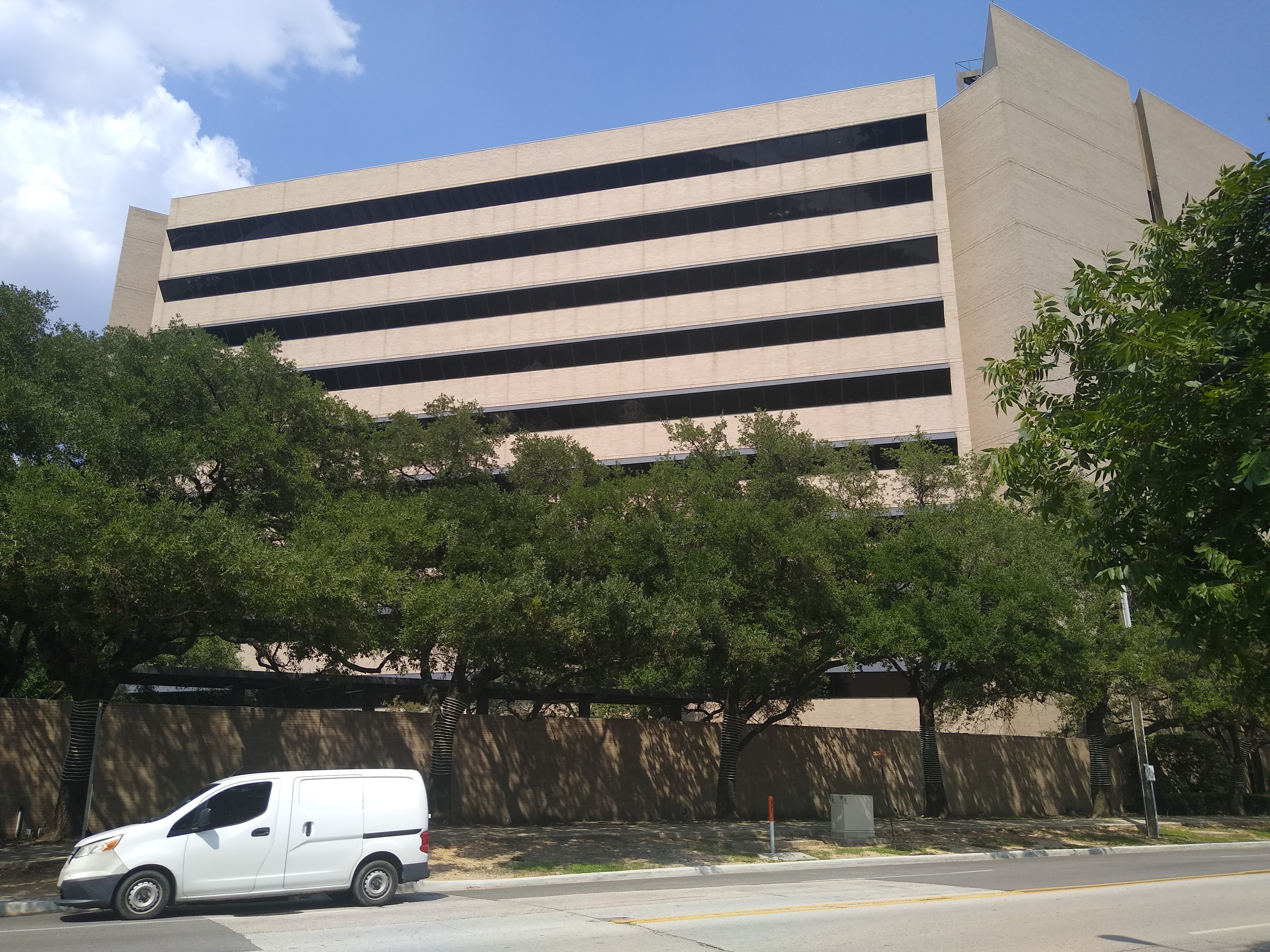
1 Bellaire Place, formerly Chevron offices (now Harris Health System headquarters)

The City of Bellaire has property zoned for light industrial, commercial, and mixed-use residential and commercial uses. Bellaire has some high-rise office buildings along Interstate 610. Frost Bank's Houston-area offices are located in Bellaire. AT&T Inc. operates its Houston-area headquarters in an office building at 6500 West Loop South in Bellaire; the building was with SBC Corporation before it absorbed the former AT&T. The Houston Metropolitan Chamber, previously the Greater Southwest Houston Chamber of Commerce, assists economy activity in Bellaire. The main offices of the Greater Southwest Houston Chamber of Commerce were previously located in Bellaire. In addition, South Texas Dental has its corporate headquarters in Bellaire.

Chevron has a 28.14-acre (113,900 m^{2}) campus, at 4800 Fournace Place in Bellaire, that is the headquarters for the Chevron Pipe Line Company along with several other business units. S. I. Morris Architects Built the building in 1977. The land contains an 11-story building, with 502,000 square feet (46,600 m^{2}) of area, that was built for Texaco; In August 1963 officials from the company asked the city government to rezone a parcel of land so the laboratory could be built. It belonged to the company prior to its merger with Chevron. The section of the street which the building was on was originally Gulfton Drive, but it was changed to Fournace, after Bellaire resident J.J. Fournace, because the Texaco management did not want their building on a street with a name similar to that of rival company Gulf Oil. In 2016 900 employees, working in company's pipeline division and other divisions, worked in the office. The parcel was the only portion of Bellaire zoned to be a "Technical Research Park" or TRP. That year Chevron announced that it was going to move the employees to its offices in Downtown Houston and sell the building. The employees were scheduled to leave by the end of 2017. HISD officials considered the idea of buying the property so a new Bellaire High School could be built there.

In 1953, the Consulate-General of Sweden moved to Bellaire. At one point the Consulate-General of Honduras in Houston was located in Suite 360 at 6700 West Loop South in Bellaire. As of 2009 the Honduran Consulate-General and the Swedish Honorary Consulate are located in Houston.

Bellaire had 8,120 employed civilians as of the 2000 Census, including 3,835 females. Of the civilian workers, 5,368 (66.1%) were private, for-profit wage and salary workers. Of these, 689 (8.5% of the total Bellaire civilian workforce) were employees of their own corporations; 952 (11.7%) were private, non-profit wage and salary workers; 446 (5.5%) worked for local governments; 479 (5.9%) were state government workers; 111 (1.4%) were federal workers; 754 (9.3%) were self-employed; none of them worked in agriculture, forestry, fishing, or hunting; and 10 (.1%) were unpaid family workers.

== Parks and recreation ==
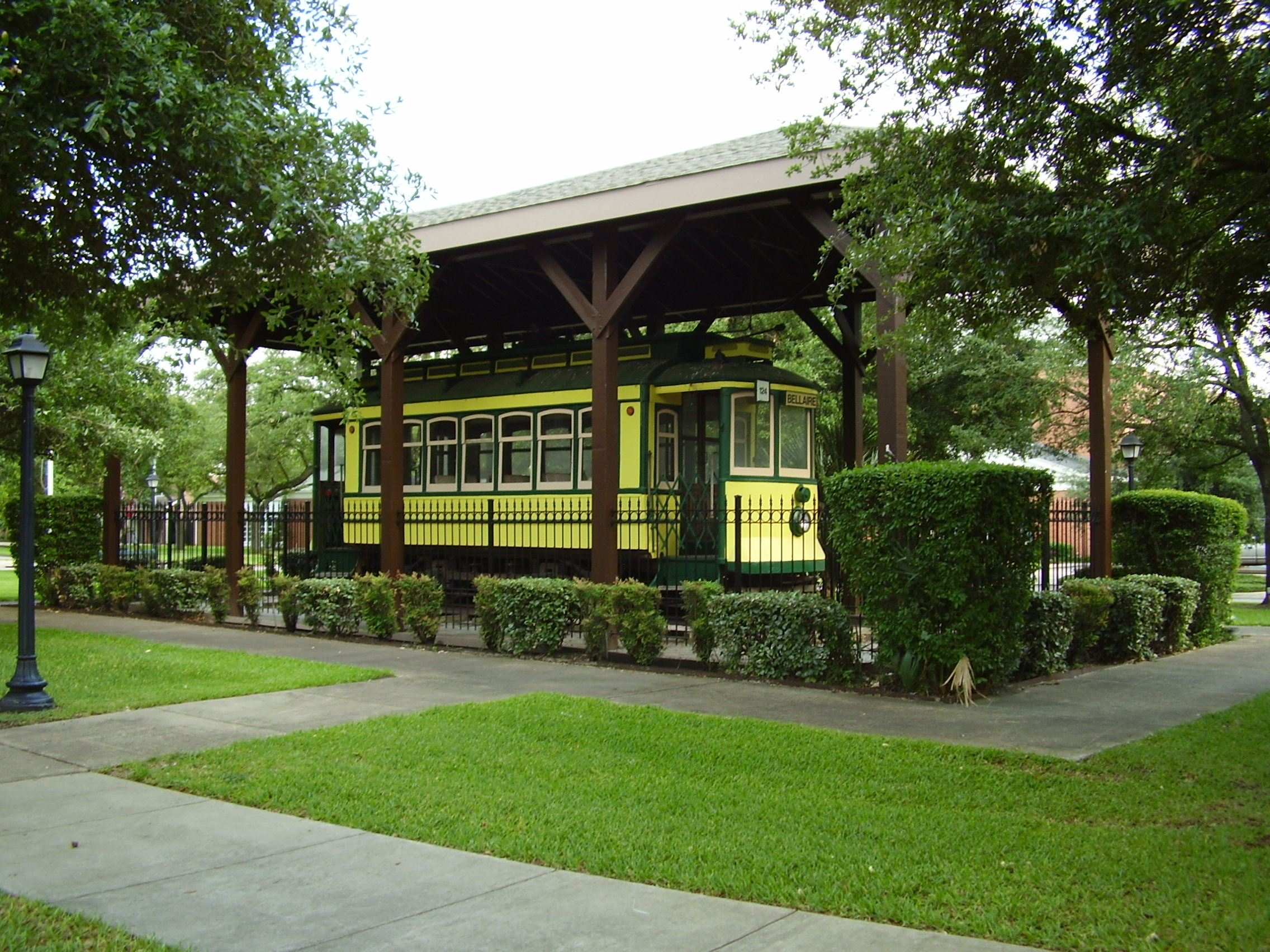
The historic Bellaire streetcar is within Paseo Park.

Evelyn's Park, on the former Teas Nursery property, is 5 acres (2.0 ha) large. The dedication ceremony of the future Evelyn's Park was held on June 25, 2011. The groundbreaking was in June 2015, and the opening was scheduled for April 22, 2017. The Yellow House has food establishments; it housed the Ivy & James restaurant until June 30, 2018.

As of 1996, Bellaire prohibits smoking in public parks and dogs in all non-dog public parks; as of that year, smoking in public parks incurs a fine of $500. The ordinance was adopted around 1996 by a 4–3 vote.

Bellaire holds annual Fourth of July parades and annual "'snow' in the park" Christmas celebrations.

Bellaire's Little League baseball team entered the Little League World Series in 2000; the team lost to the team of Maracaibo, Venezuela. In 2002 Bellaire's little league team was placed in the same league as the West University Place team. Previously they played in separate leagues.

The Weekley YMCA in Houston includes Bellaire in its service area, It opened in 1951 as the Southwest YMCA. in West University Place. The current facility in Braeswood Place, Houston broke ground in 2001.

== Education ==
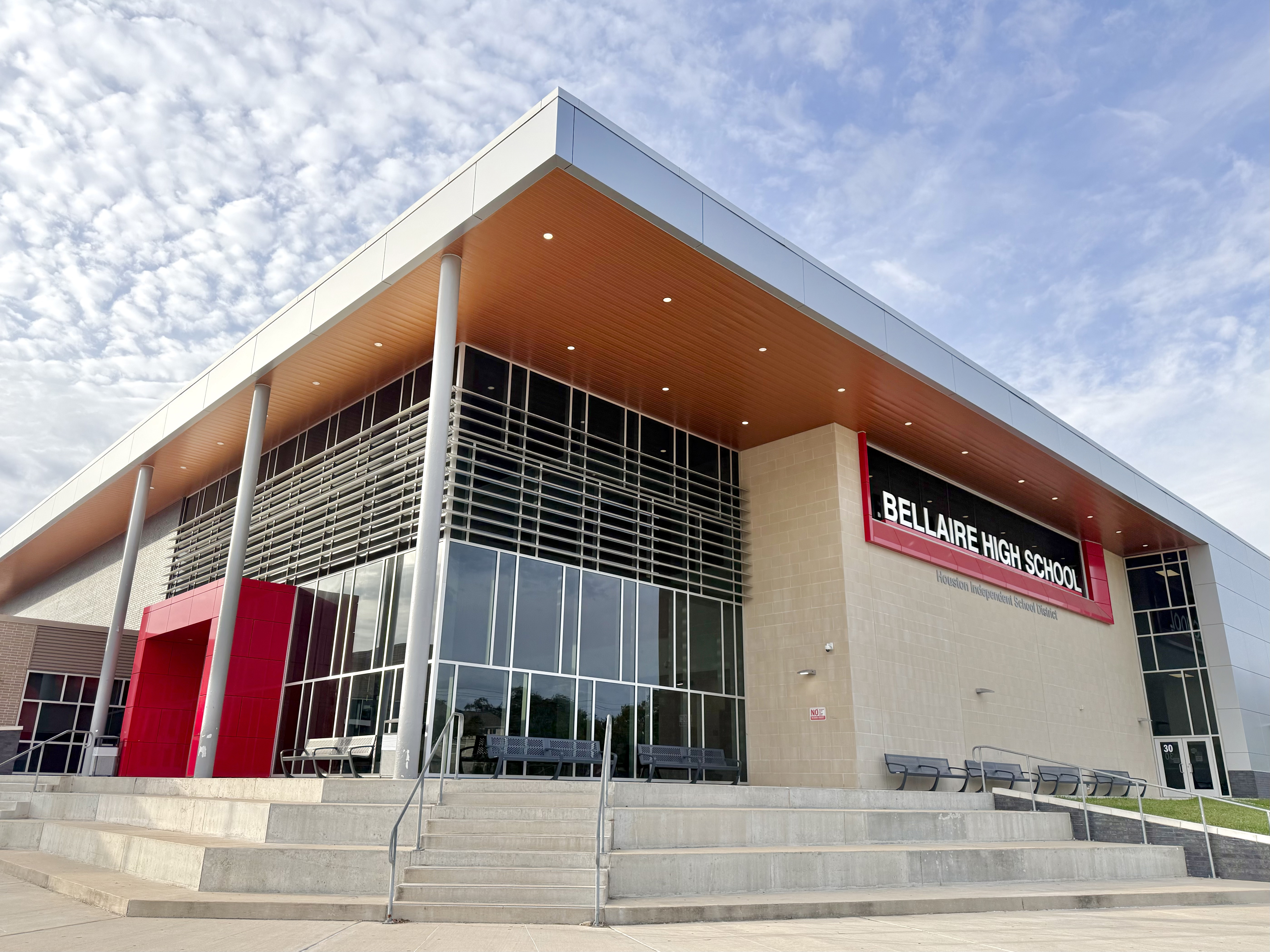
Bellaire High School

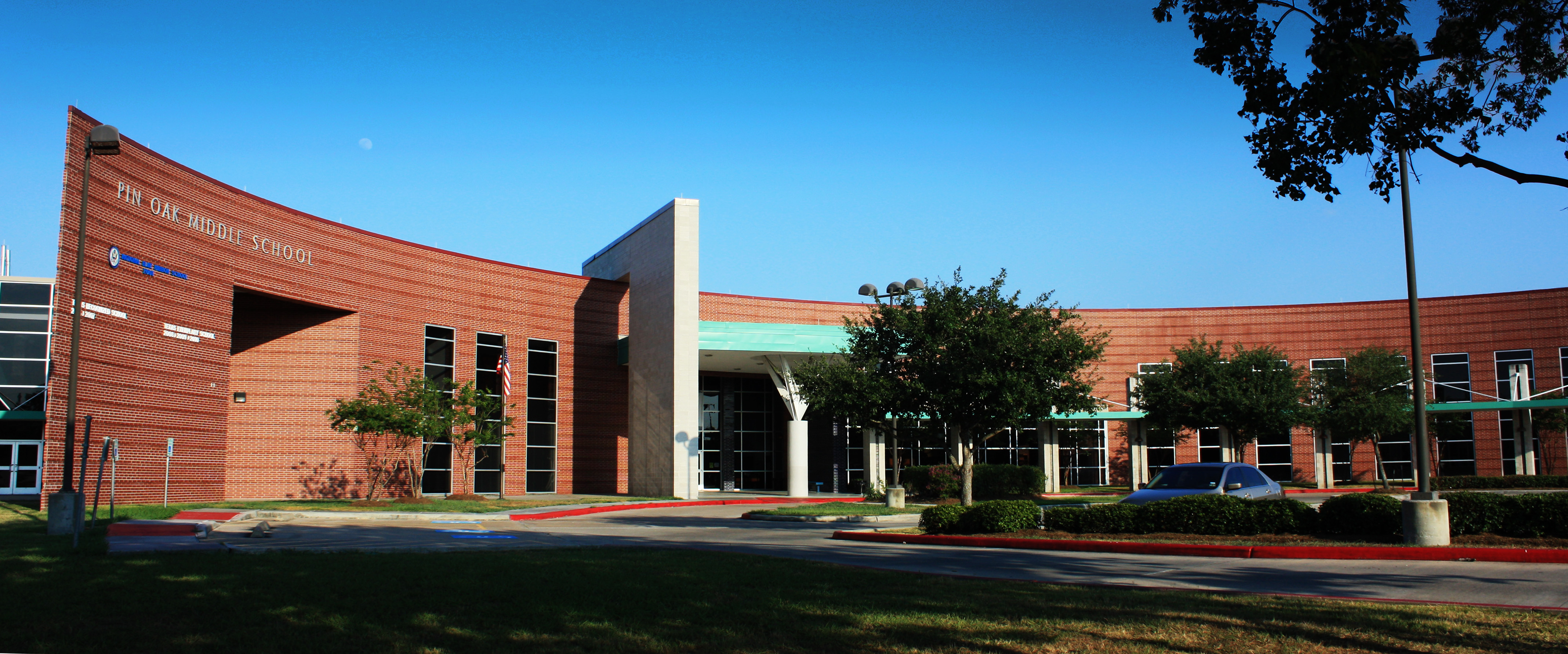
Pin Oak Middle School

=== Primary and secondary public schools ===
The city is served by Houston Independent School District (HISD). Bellaire is within Trustee District V.

Pupils who live in Bellaire inside of the 610 Loop are zoned to Paul W. Horn Academy for elementary school, while students in Bellaire outside of the 610 Loop are zoned to either Al J. Condit Elementary School or Lovett Elementary School, the latter of which is in Houston. Condit Elementary is located on blocks 29–30 of the original Bellaire townsite.

In addition, all Bellaire pupils are zoned to Pershing Middle School in the Braeswood Place neighborhood of Houston and Bellaire High School in Bellaire. In addition, a middle school called Pin Oak Middle School, which was built in 2002, is located in Bellaire. Students zoned to Johnston, Long, and Pershing Middle Schools may choose to attend Pin Oak instead; therefore Bellaire students may attend Pin Oak. Pin Oak was named a National Blue Ribbon School in 2008.

Circa 2014 HISD built a new campus for Condit Elementary School. Designed by VLK Architects, it has a capacity of 750 students. The building has 33 classrooms and a total of 83,000 square feet (7,700 m^{2}) in space. The groundbreaking ceremony was held on November 10, 2014, and the new school building opened in 2016.

==== History of schools ====
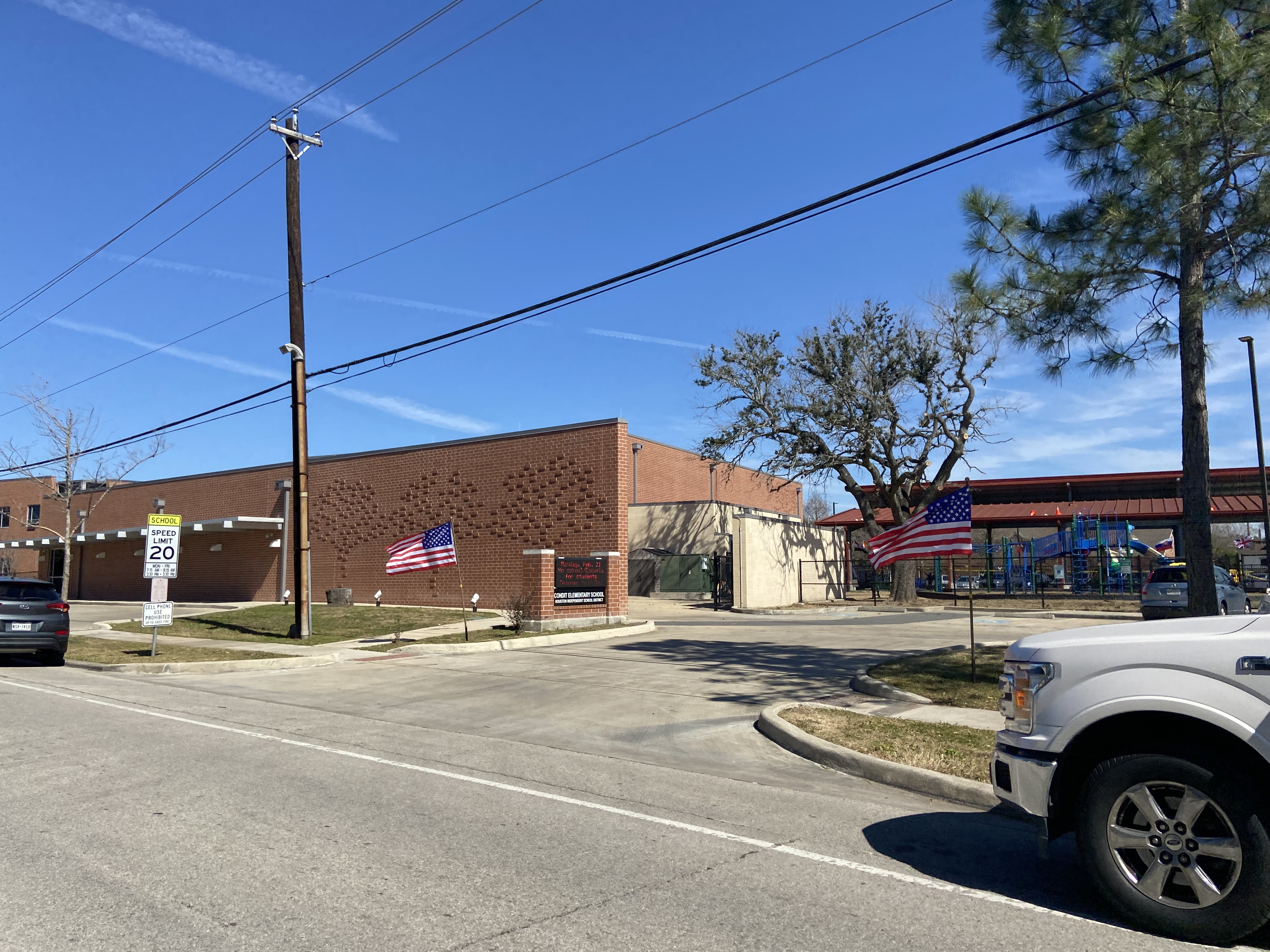
Condit Elementary School, which serves most of the western half of Bellaire

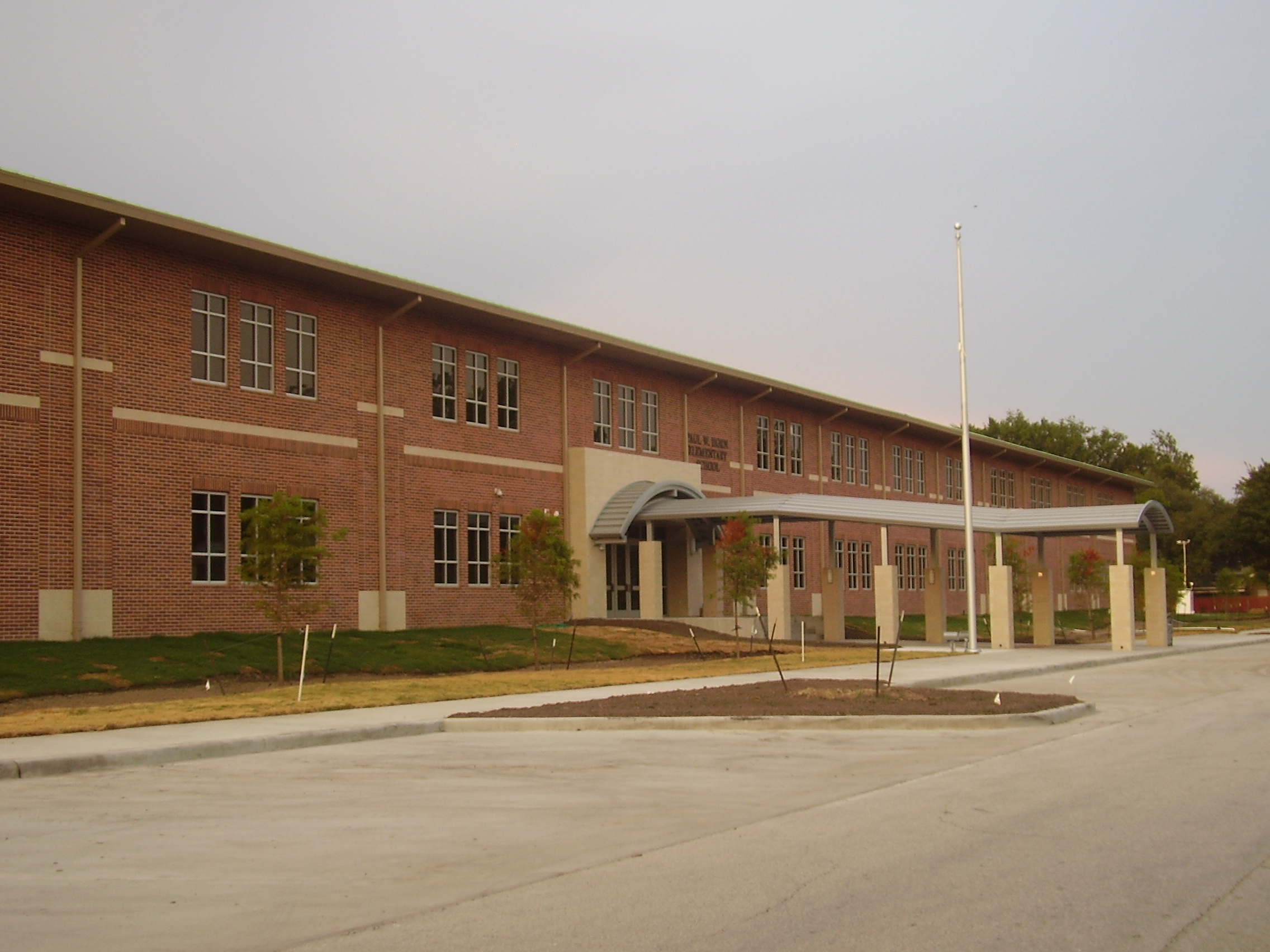
Horn Academy, which serves the eastern half of Bellaire

Bellaire's first school opened in 1909; the school moved to a new site in 1914 and an addition opened in 1927; when the addition opened the school was renamed "Condit." Horn opened in 1949, and Bellaire High School opened in 1955. Condit received a new wing with 12 classrooms in the 1950s. Pin Oak opened in 2002. The current Horn and Lovett buildings were scheduled to open in August 2011. The rebuilds of Horn, Lovett, and Herod Elementary of Houston together had a cost of $49 million and were a part of a $1 billion bond program approved by HISD voters in 2007.

Maud W. Gordon Elementary School in Bellaire did not have a zoning boundary; before 2012 it drew excess students from apartments west of Bellaire, in Houston, to relieve other schools in Houston west of Bellaire such as Benavidez, Cunningham, Elrod, and Milne. From its opening to 1953 to 1983 Gordon served as a neighborhood school. After its closure Gordon temporarily housed the Post Oak School and later served as administrative offices. It re-opened as a relief school in 1988 for Elrod and Cunningham schools. It was scheduled to re-open in September of that year. At the time, 80% of the students had lunches that were no cost or reduced in price, and 96% were from ethnic minorities. In 2012 HISD opened the Mandarin Chinese Language Immersion Magnet School Chinese language-immersion magnet school, in the former Gordon Elementary building. It is HISD's first Chinese immersion school. The school was scheduled to move to the St. George Place area of Houston; it was scheduled to open in August 2016. In 2017 HISD announced plans to demolish the Gordon/former MIMS campus so Bellaire High School's baseball practice field could be relocated there, allowing HISD to easily rebuild the high school main campus.

=== Primary and secondary private schools ===
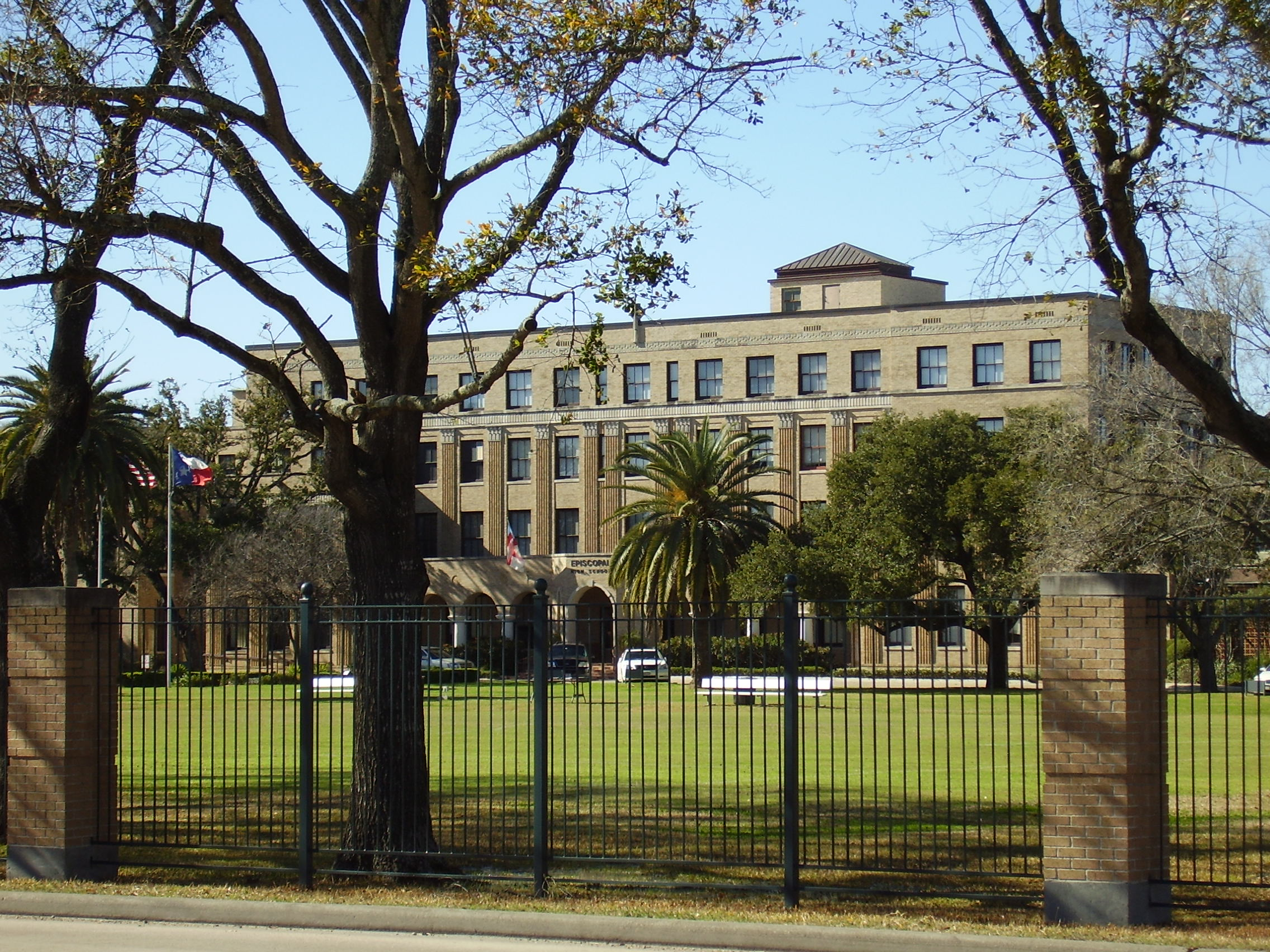
Episcopal High School

Three independent (private) schools, including Episcopal High School (9–12), The Post Oak School (Montessori K–8), and the Veritas Christian Academy (K–8), are located in Bellaire. Episcopal High School opened in fall 1984. Its campus previously housed Marion High School and the Congregation of the Sisters of the Incarnate Word and Blessed Sacrament, a Roman Catholic school operated by the Sisters of the Incarnate Word and Blessed Sacrament and within the Roman Catholic Archdiocese of Galveston-Houston. The current campus of the Post Oak School opened in 1986; the school had been previously housed in the Gordon Elementary School campus.

Holy Ghost School, a Catholic private K–8 school, is located in Houston and adjacent to the Bellaire city limits. Another Catholic K–8, St. Vincent de Paul School, is nearby.

Other private schools near Bellaire in areas of Houston include Saint Agnes Academy, Strake Jesuit College Preparatory, and St. Thomas' Episcopal School. As of 2019 The Village School in the Energy Corridor area has a bus service to an area along Westpark, via Royal Oaks Country Club. This stop serves students living in Bellaire.

=== Community colleges ===
The Texas Legislature designated Houston Community College System (HCC) as serving Houston ISD (including Bellaire).

The community college district operates the HCCS Gulfton Center, located at 5407 Gulfton Drive in the Gulfton area of Houston. Gulfton Center, a 35,100-square-foot (3,260 m^{2}) campus building owned by HCCS, opened in 1990 after Mutual Benefit Life Insurance Co. sold the building to HCCS for $700,000 (equivalent to $1.48 million in 2024 dollars). The West Loop Center, an HCCS-owned campus at 5601 West Loop South which opened in Spring 1999, is in Houston and in close proximity to Bellaire. Both the Gulfton and West Loop campuses are part of the district's Southwest College.

=== Public libraries ===
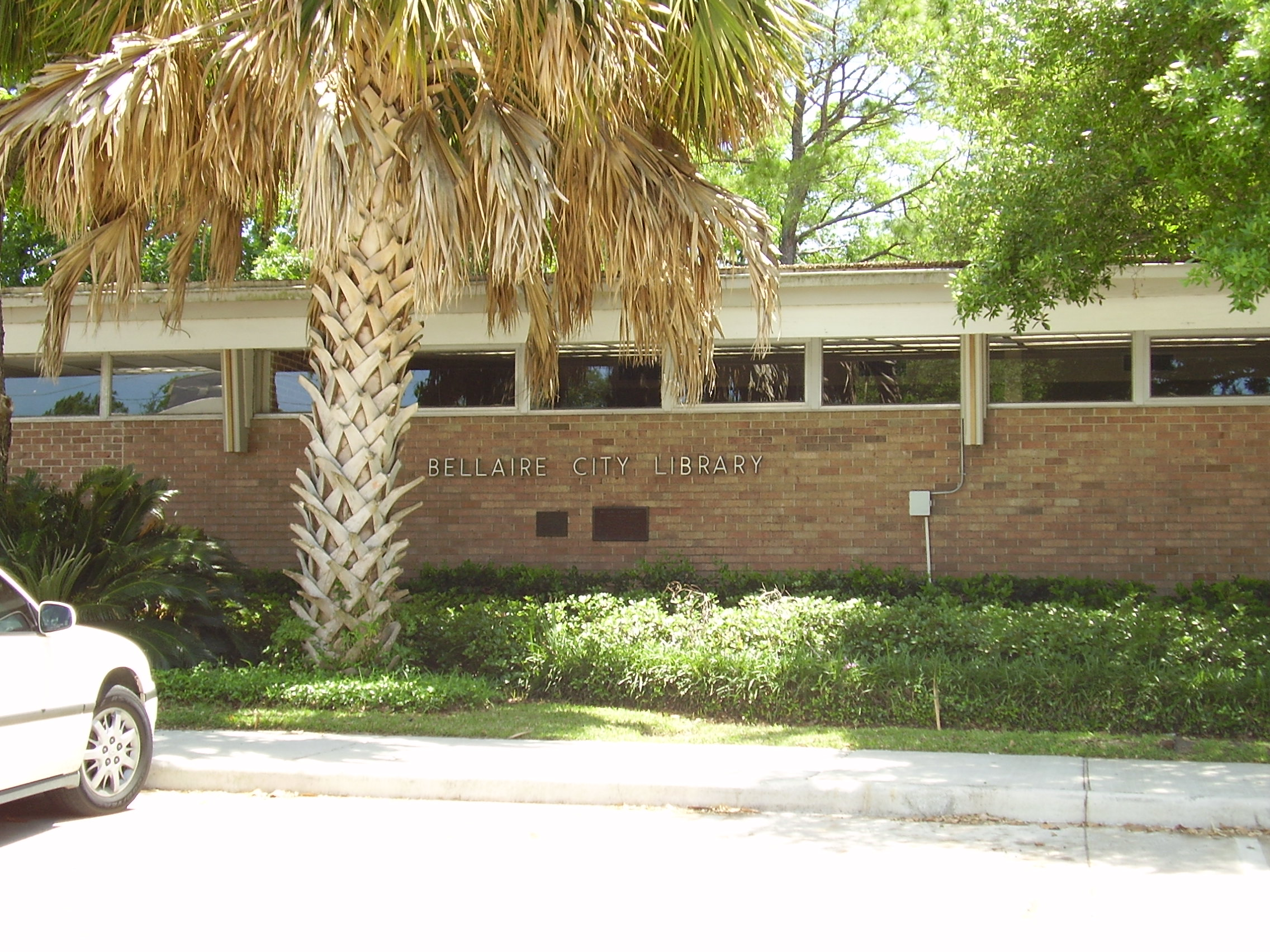
Bellaire City Library

The city of Bellaire also operates its own library, the Bellaire City Library, at 5111 Jessamine Street. It opened in 1951; initially the sole librarian worked only part-time. The Friends of the Bellaire Library, a 501(c)(3) non-profit organization, was established that year to support the City of Bellaire Library.

== Media ==
The Houston Chronicle is the area regional newspaper. Residents receive the Bellaire/West U/River Oaks/Meyerland local section.

The Village News and Southwest News is the oldest local paper currently published in Bellaire; its offices are at 5160 Spruce Street. The Bellaire Examiner is a newspaper distributed free to residents. The Bellaire Buzz, one of four magazines produced by the Buzz Magazines, is a monthly publication about people, products and services in the community. It is mailed free of charge to all residents the first week of each month. BellaireConnect.com is a community website for Bellaire and its surrounding neighborhoods. Bellaire•West University Essentials is an informational community magazine that is delivered monthly to all homes in the city.

In the mid-20th century the community newspaper Southwestern Times served Bellaire and surrounding communities. The paper was headquartered in Rice Village, and it served as an official publication for the city.

The Bellaire Texan, which served the community in the mid-20th Century, was headquartered in Bellaire and published by the Texan Publishing Corporation. It was an official paper of that city. By 1975 it became known as the Bellaire & Southwestern Texan and was published by the Preston Publishing Company. It was then headquartered in Houston. Jack Gurwell had established the newspaper in 1954; Lynn McBee of the Bellaire Examiner described him as "a Damon Runyonesque character".

== Transportation ==
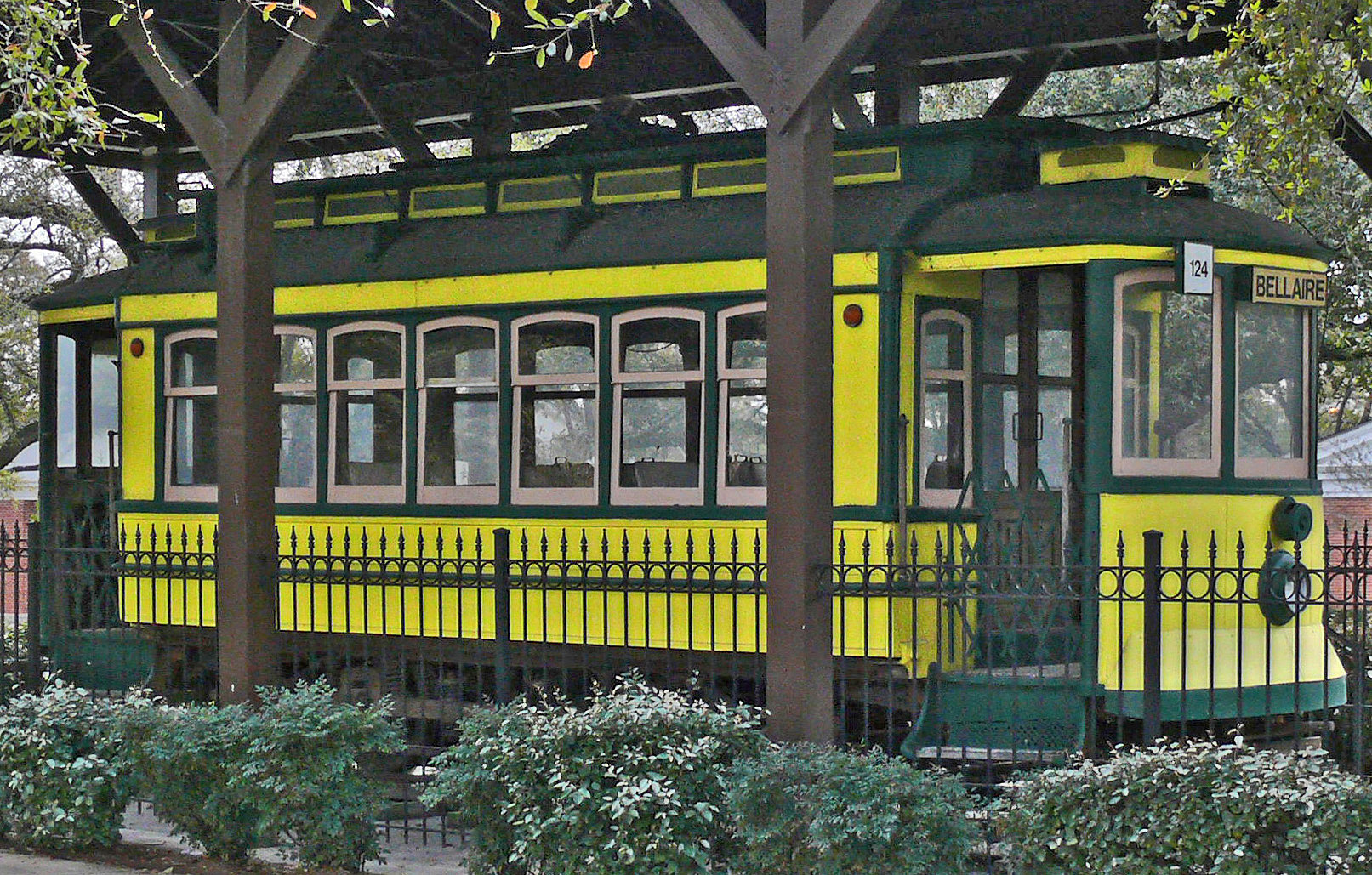
Bellaire, Texas' Toonerville Trolley

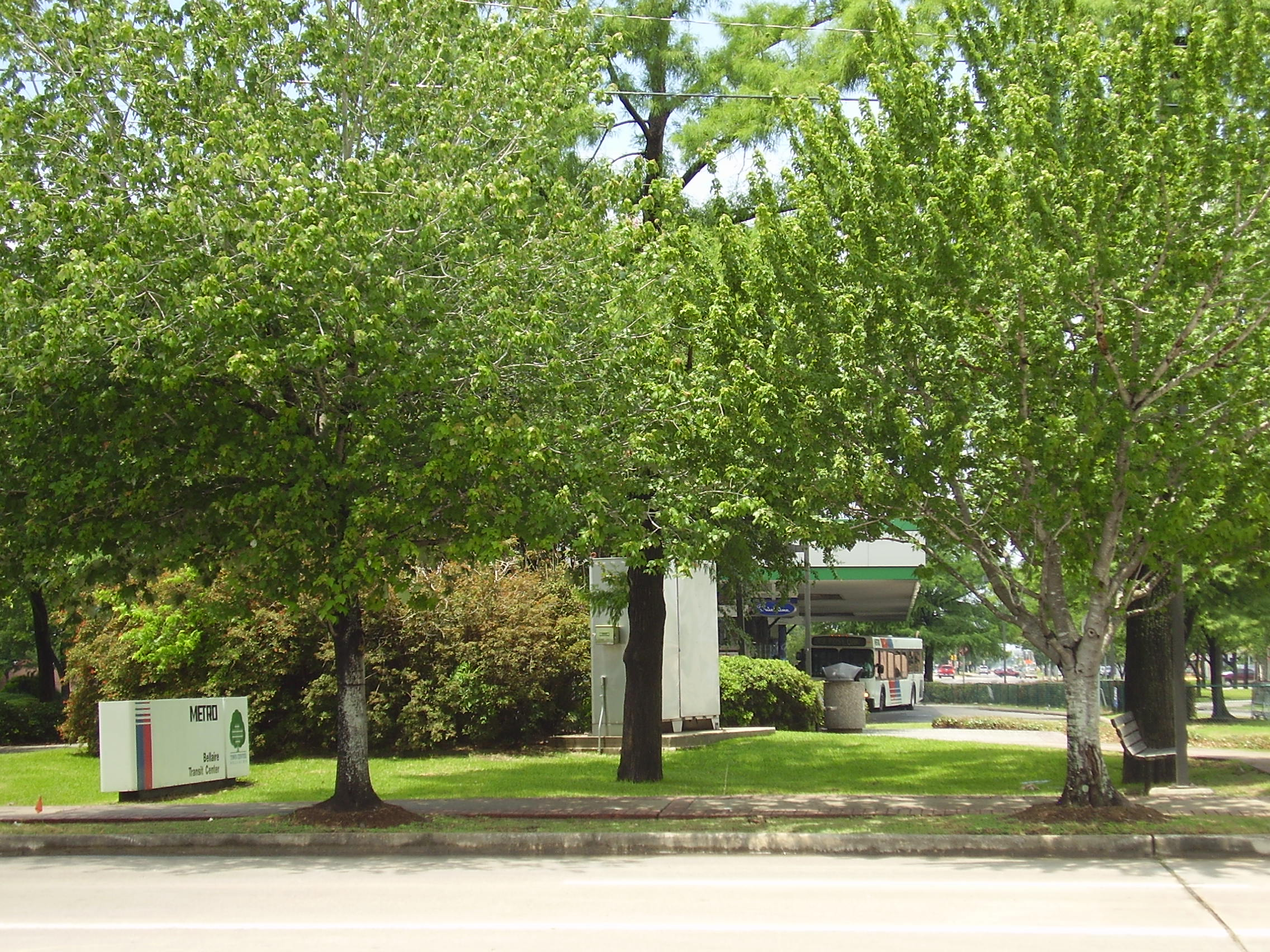
Bellaire Transit Center

Bellaire is a member city of the Metropolitan Transit Authority of Harris County, Texas (METRO). The city is served by bus lines 2 (Bellaire), 9 (Gulfton/Holman), 20 (Canal/Memorial), 49 (Chimney Rock/S Post Oak), 65 (Bissonnet), 309 (Gulfton Circulator), and 402 Bellaire Quickline. The Bellaire Transit Center, located at 5100 Bellaire Boulevard at South Rice Avenue, has six lines (2, 20, 49, 65, 309, 402). As of 2010 METRO has proposed to build the Bellaire Station as part of the METRORail University Line.

In Bellaire's early history, Bellaire Boulevard and a historic street car line connected Bellaire to Houston. The street car line, which ran a four-mile (6 km) stretch from central Bellaire to Houston's Main Street, started construction in 1909. The streetcar line consisted of one railway track and an overhead electric wire. A waiting pavilion and a turnaround loop were located at the terminus in Bellaire. The Houston Electric Company had simultaneously constructed a south end line from Eagle Avenue to what is now Fannin Street to connect to the Bellaire Boulevard line. Service, with one required transfer at Eagle Avenue, began on December 28, 1910. The streetcar was nicknamed the "Toonerville Trolley". On September 26, 1927, the trolley line was abandoned and replaced by a bus line. This was due to frequent derailments caused by a worn-out track and the advent of the automobile. In 1985, a similar streetcar was acquired in Portugal and brought to Bellaire for permanent display.

== Notable people ==
- Jon Bass
- Ezra Charles
- Bubba Crosby
- José Cruz Jr., longtime MLB outfielder and coach
- Richard Linklater
- Emeka Okafor, former college and NBA player
- Dennis Quaid
- Randy Quaid
- Brent Spiner
- Jaylen Waddle
- Josh Wolf (born 2000), baseball player in the Cleveland Indians organization and for Team Israel

== See also ==
- List of cities in Texas
