= Quickline =

Bus rapid transit service in Houston, Texas

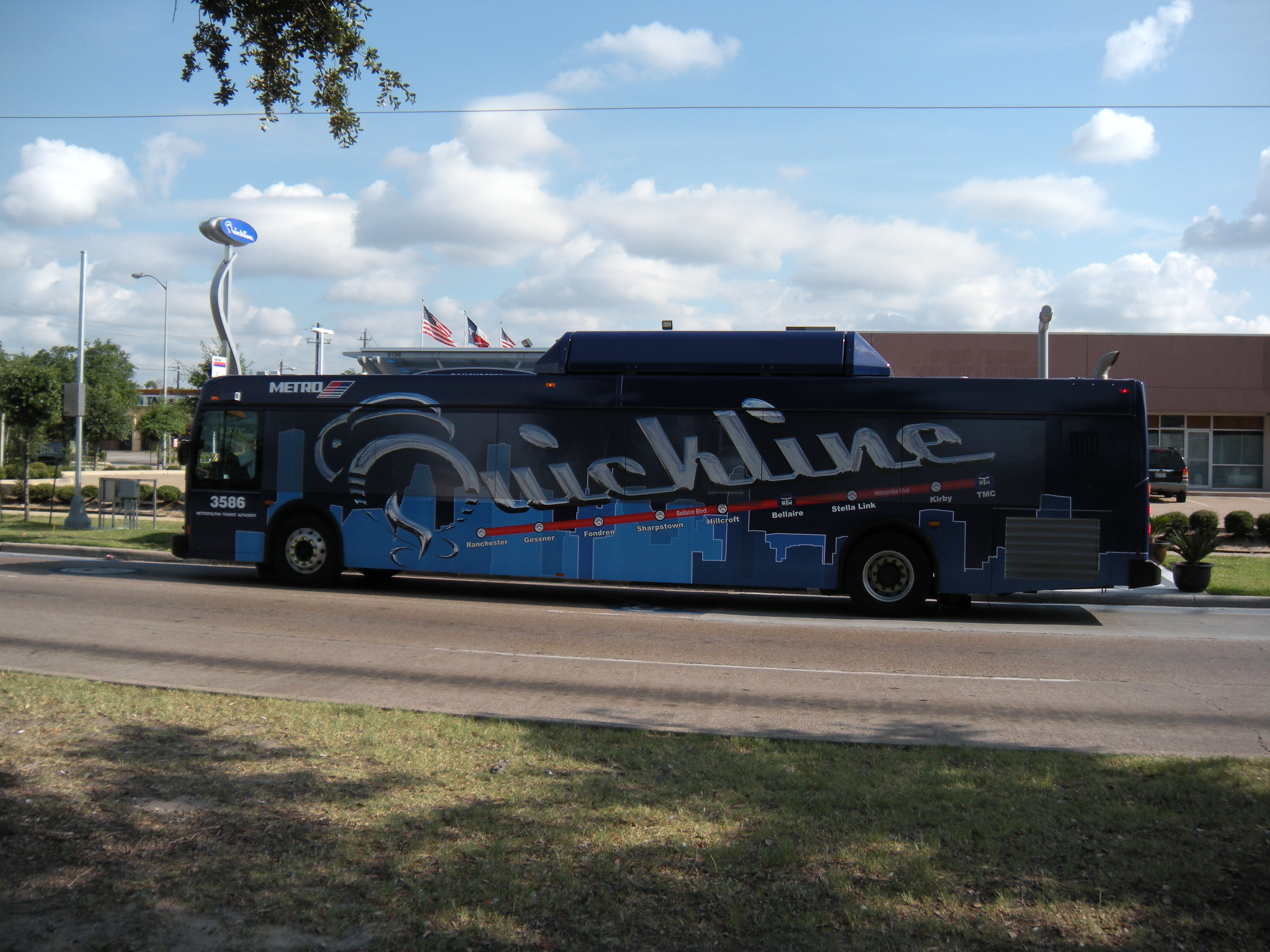
- New Flyer DE41LFR in Quickline livery (2009)

Overview
- System: Metropolitan Transit Authority of Harris County (METRO)
- Vehicle: Nova Bus LFSe+ (40ft electric)
- Began service: June 1, 2009; 17 years ago
- Ended service: February 20, 2026; 6 months ago

Routes
- Routes: Bellaire (route 402)
- Locale: Houston (Texas, USA)
- Start: Ranchester (west)
- End: TMC Transit Center Station (east)
- Length: 9 mi (14.5 km)
- Stations: 10

Quickline (also known as Signature Service) was a bus rapid transit (BRT) service operated by the Metropolitan Transit Authority of Harris County (METRO). Launched in 2009, Quickline provided supplementary service to high-use METRO bus routes, featuring improved buses and stations, fewer stops, and signal priority for improved efficiency. It was one of two BRT services operated by METRO, the other being the METRORapid Silver Line.

Quickline consisted of one route, Bellaire Quickline (also known as 402 or QL2), which supplemented Route 2 and served a 9-mile (14 km) stretch of Bellaire Boulevard from Texas Medical Center to Chinatown on weekdays. Bellaire Quickline ended service on February 20, 2026 due to low ridership. Quickline service on other high-use routes had been proposed but was never fully implemented.

== System ==
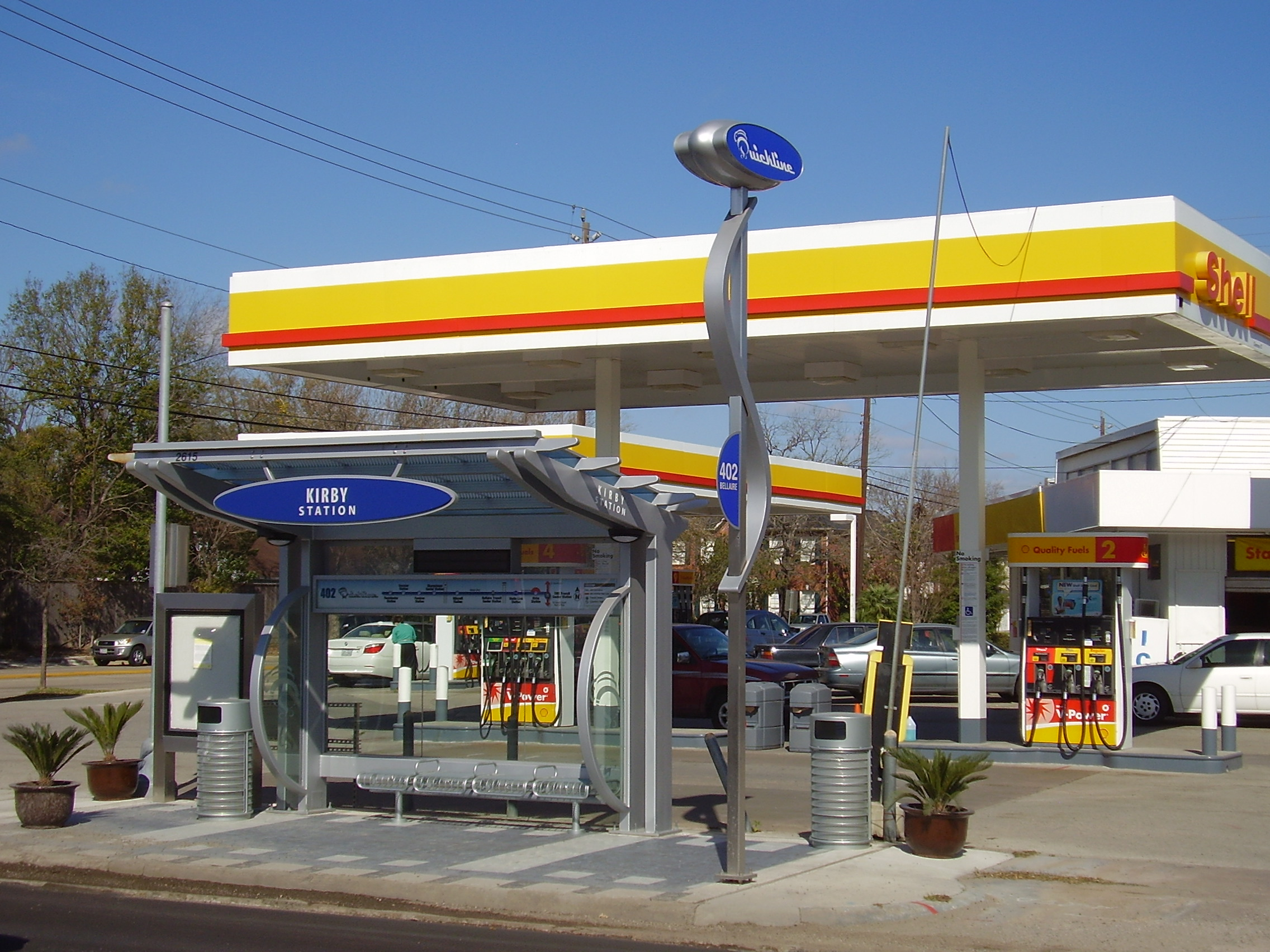
Westbound Kirby station

Quickline stops featured a distinctive design and signage, larger benches, and improved lighting. A digital display provided the estimated arrival time of upcoming buses, which was updated live using GPS tracking.

When the Bellaire route was first created, METRO painted a blue line along Bellaire Boulevard to provide a visual indication of the corridor to riders. Due to complaints from the Bellaire city council, this was later removed.

=== Rolling stock ===
The service originally used 41-foot (12 m) New Flyer DE41LFR hybrid-electric buses, which provided on-board security cameras, more comfortable seating, and a quieter interior. The buses were also equipped with automated signaling devices that provide signal priority by lengthening green lights. To distinguish the service from regular METRO buses, they were given a blue-colored vinyl wrap with Quickline's insignia and rabbit logo, as well as a simplified route map.

In 2024, after 15 years of service, the New Flyer buses were replaced with 40-foot (12 m) Nova Bus LFSe+ battery-electric buses, which provided USB charging ports and additional space for wheelchair users. These buses were not Quickline-branded because they were also used on a non-Quickline route.

== Bellaire Quickline ==
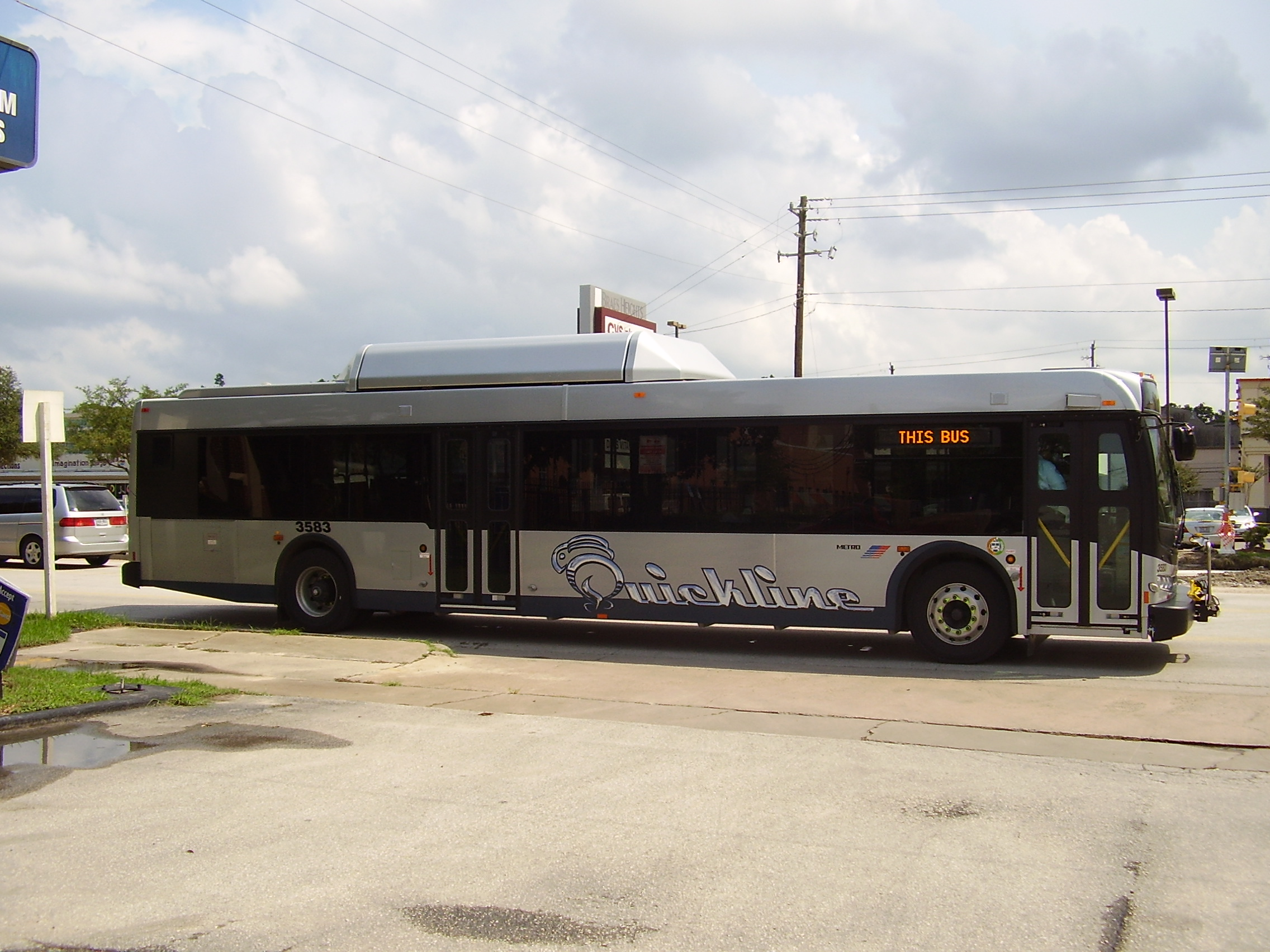
Prototype Quickline livery (2008)

Bellaire Quickline (route 402 or QL2) was the only Quickline route in operation. The 9-mile (14 km) route traveled along Bellaire Boulevard and Holcombe Boulevard between Texas Medical Center Transit Center and Ranchester Drive, stopping near Bellaire's intersection with Sam Houston Tollway (Beltway 8). The route passed through the cities of Bellaire, Southside Place, and West University Place, as well as the Sharpstown and Chinatown neighborhoods. The route only operated on weekdays.

Route 2, the main route on Bellaire Boulevard, continued 6 miles (9.7 km) further west to a METRO transit center in Mission Bend. Due to Quickline's smaller number of stops and signal priority, a typical trip between TMC and Ranchester took 38 minutes, 14 minutes shorter than the same trip on route 2. However, route 2 was more frequent, arriving every 15 minutes versus Quickline's 30, and offered weekend service.

=== Stations ===
Bellaire Quickline serviced 10 stations, including two bus transit centers and a stop on the METRORail Red Line. All but one of these stations are still serviced by route 2, though the Quickline bus shelters have been replaced with generic METRO bus shelters.

The table below lists the stations and any bus routes that they connect to. Frequent bus routes (headways of at least 15 minutes) are listed in bold.

| Station | Connections | Notes |
|---|---|---|
| Clarewood at Ranchester | | western terminus |
| Ranchester | Bus: **2**, 152 | Serves Chinatown |
| Gessner | Bus: **2**, **46** | |
| Fondren | Bus: **2**, 9, **63** | |
| PlazAmericas (Note: originally Sharpstown Center) | Bus: **2**, 9 | Serves PlazAmericas mall |
| Hillcroft | Bus: **2**, **47**, 309, 310 | |
| Bellaire Transit Center | Bus: **2**, 20, 49, **65**, 309, 310 | Serves the city of Bellaire; Located in the median of Bellaire Boulevard |
| Stella Link (Note: added to route in early 2010) | Bus: **2**, 10 | Bellaire Boulevard continues as Holcombe Boulevard east of intersection Serves Southside Place and West University Place |
| Kirby | Bus: **2**, 10, 41 | |
| TMC Transit Center | METRORail: Red Line; Bus: **2**, **4**, 10, 14, 27, 28, 41, 56, 60, 68, 84, 87; Park & Ride shuttles: 270, 292, 297, 298 | eastern terminus Serves Texas Medical Center |

== Proposed expansions ==
Shortly after Quickline was introduced, METRO introduced SwiftLine (route 426), a five-stop route connecting TMC Transit Center to Southeast Transit Center. Similar to Quickline, SwiftLine mirrored a segment of an existing route (in this case route 26) with fewer stops, but it did not feature bus or station improvements. METRO officials planned to convert SwiftLine to a full Quickline route if ridership met expectations, but this did not occur, and the route was discontinued in 2015.

In 2019, METRO's comprehensive METRONext plan included Westheimer Signature, a Quickline route along Westheimer Road. This service would supplement route 82, the system's most-traveled route, and it would also use two-way high-occupancy vehicle lanes on U.S. Route 59 between Greenway Plaza and Midtown to further improve travel times. However, this proposal was quietly dropped in favor of more general corridor improvements.
