= Wheeler station =

Wheeler
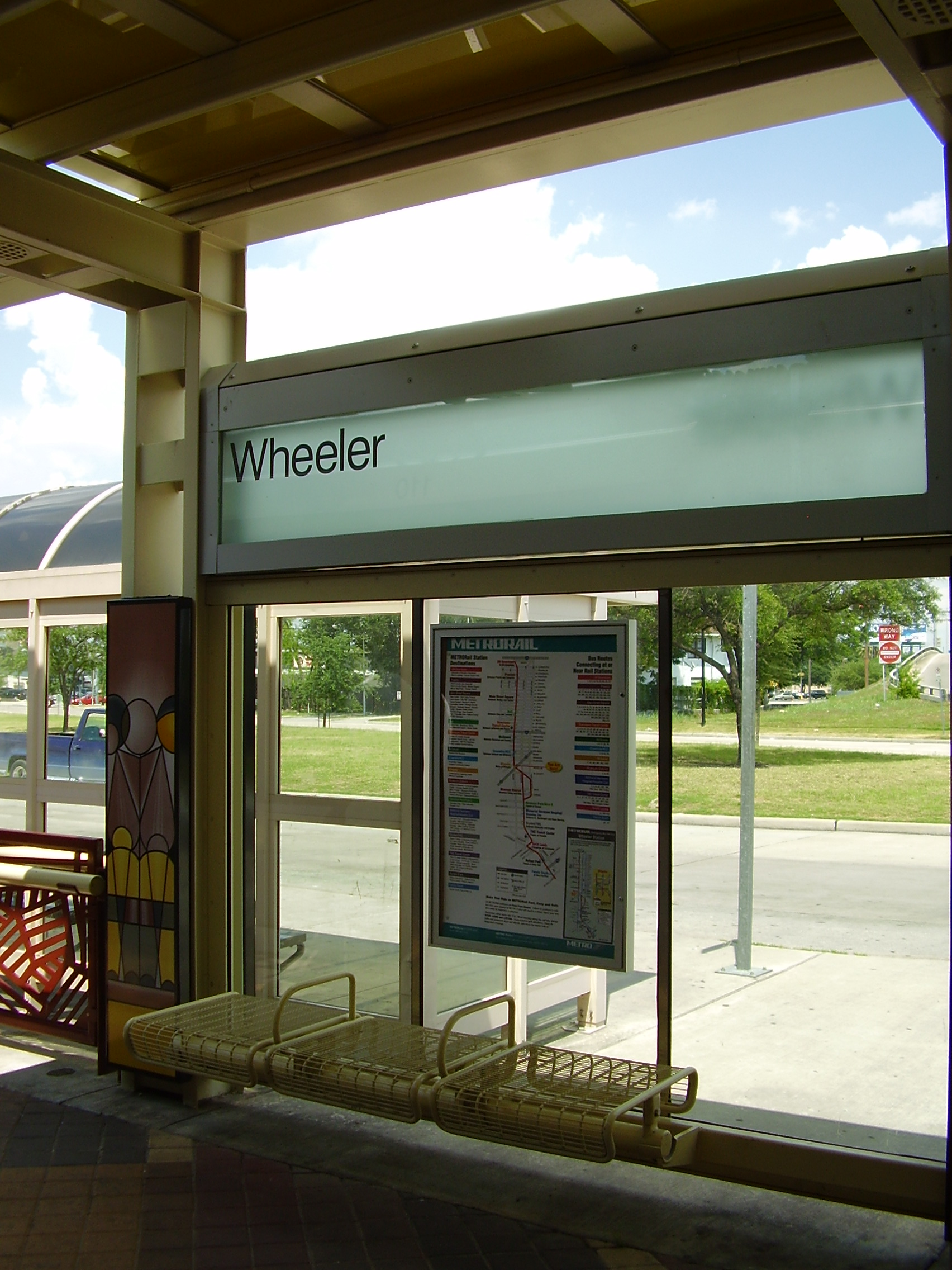
- Wheeler Station

General information
- Location: 4500½ Main Street, Houston, TX
- Coordinates: 29°43′57.98″N 95°23′0.08″W
- Owner: METRO
- Lines: Red Line; University/Blue Line (future)
- Platforms: 2 side platforms
- Tracks: 2
- Connections: 5, 25, 65, 152, 153

Construction
- Structure type: At grade
- Platform levels: 1
- Cycle facilities: Racks located at station; bicycles allowed on Metrorail during off-peak hours
- Accessible: yes

Other information
- Fare zone: 1 Local

History
- Opened: January 1, 2004; 22 years ago

Services
Preceding station	METRORail	Following station
Museum District toward Fannin South	Red Line	Ensemble/HCC toward Northline Transit Center/HCC

Proposed services (2030)
Preceding station	METRORapid	Following station
Montrose toward Westchase Park and Ride	University Line	Almeda toward Tidwood Transit Center
Location

Wheeler Station is a station on the METRO Red Line in Houston. The station is located at the intersection of Main Street and Wheeler Street in Midtown.

This station will also be a transfer station for the METRORapid University Line, when it is built.

Prior to the construction of the METRORail Purple Line, Wheeler Station was the only station in the system that had platforms that faced each other. UH South/University Oaks station became the second station to implement this platform configuration.
