= The Ensemble Theatre =

African-American theatre company in Houston, Texas

Coordinates: 29.7389°N 95.3786°W

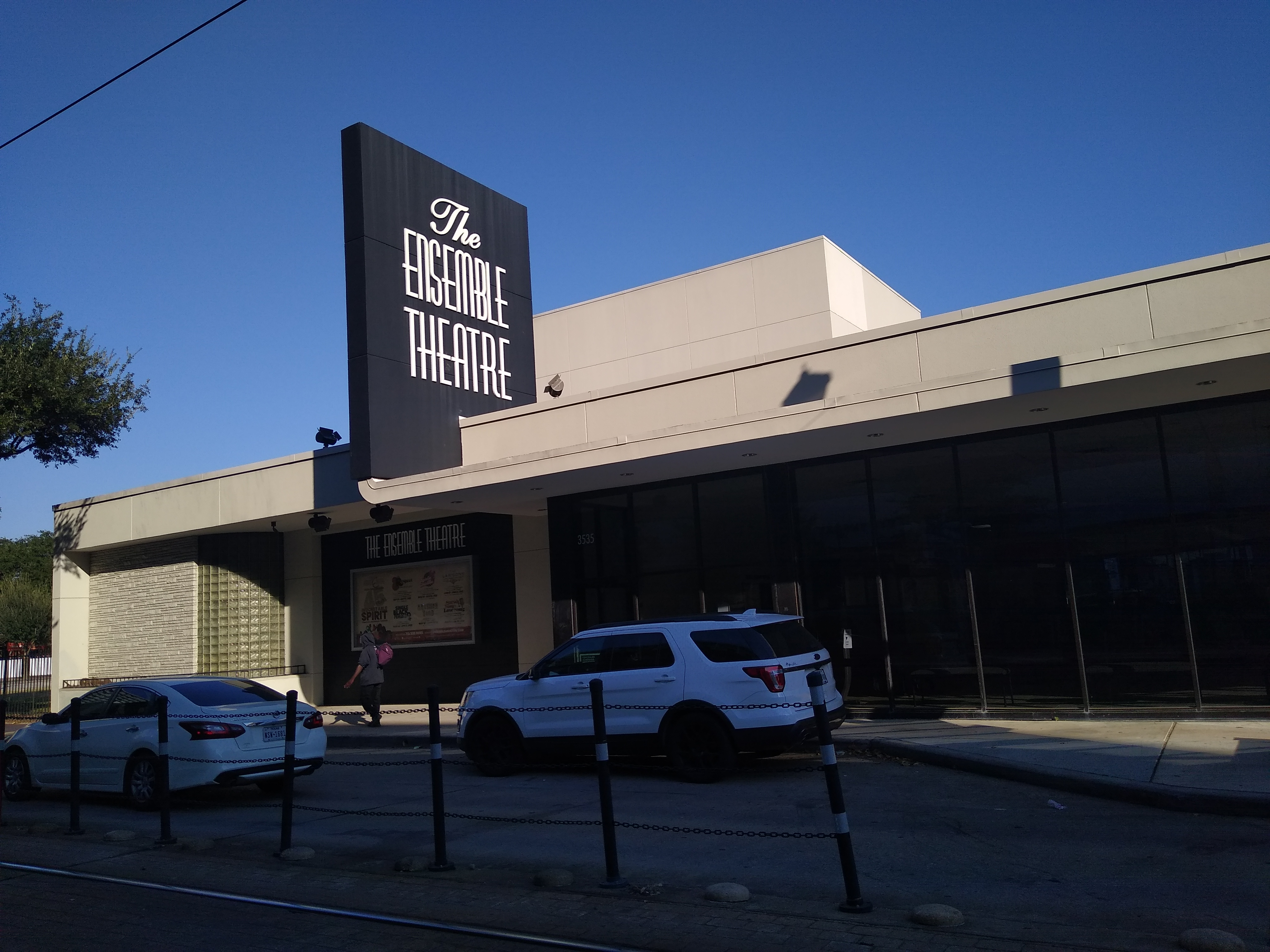
The Ensemble Theatre in Houston, Texas

The Ensemble Theatre, located in the heart of midtown at 3535 Main Street in Houston, Texas, is the largest African-American professional theatre company in the United States that produces plays in-house and owns its own facility.

== History ==
The Ensemble Theatre is a non-profit organization founded by George Hawkins in 1976 as a touring company that rehearsed in a church basement.

In 2003, the company was awarded $250,000 from the Houston Endowment Inc., with which it retired its original capital campaign debt and made some improvements to the facility. Since 1991, Houston Endowment Inc. has granted a total of $1,220,500 to the Ensemble, including an annual operating grant.

In August 2006, the Ensemble Theatre celebrated its 30-year anniversary, as it launched its 2006/2007 production season. This celebration included the presentation of an award to American actor and director Danny Glover, as the 2006 "Lifetime Achievement" honoree.

== The theatre building ==
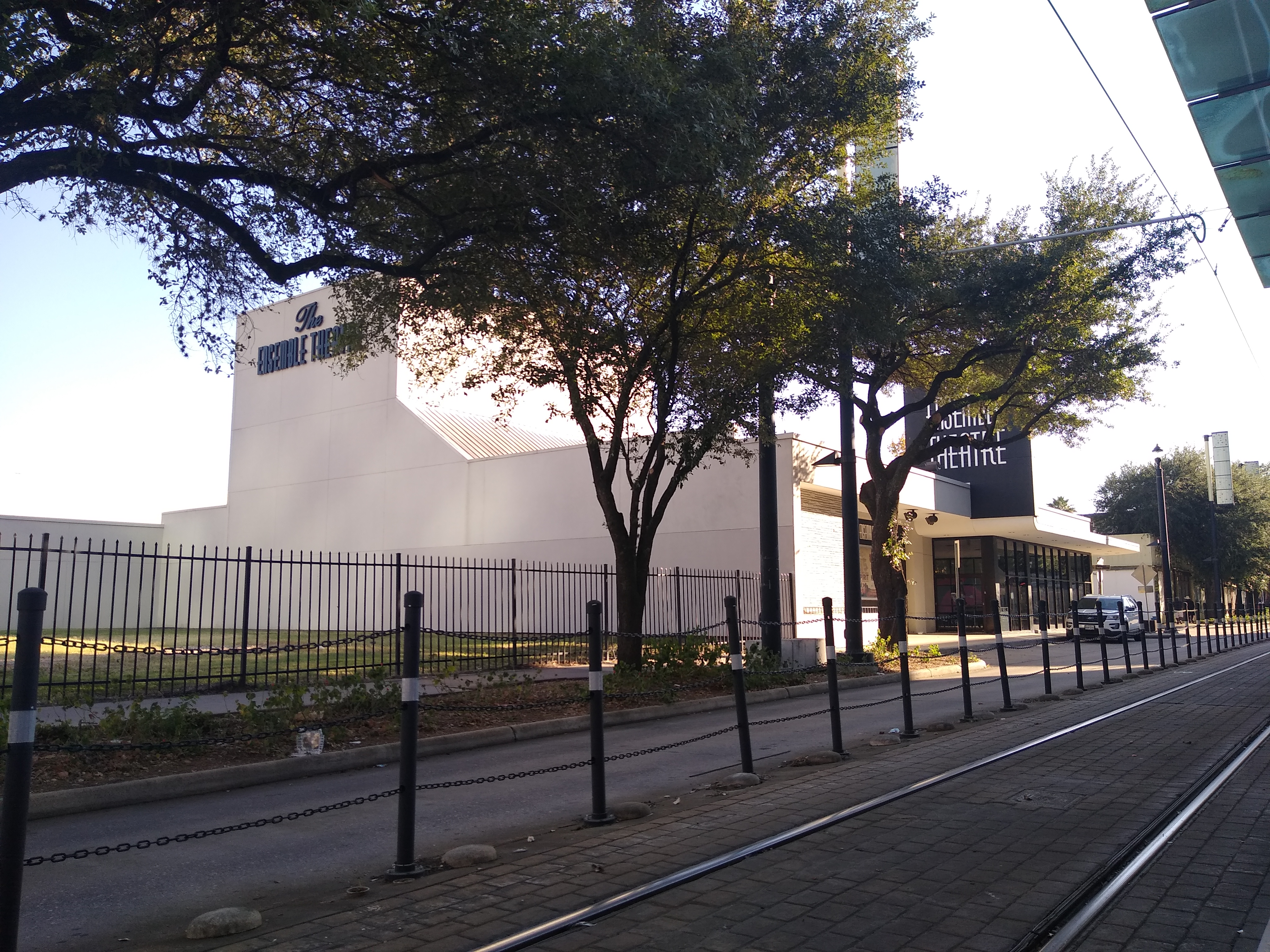
The Ensemble Theatre building

The Ensemble building, with its glass-enclosed lobby, hosts three stages located in the heart of Midtown, Houston Midtown, where a Metro Rail stop bears its name, Ensemble/HCC station, an honor shared with the nearby Houston Community College Houston ("HCC"). The facility includes a main stage auditorium with seating for 200, an arena stage that seats 125, and a grand performance hall that accommodates 500 people.

== The company ==
Each year the theatre presents a repertoire of critically acclaimed dramas, comedies and musicals that demonstrates the artistic ability of more than 250 professional local, regional and national artists and support staff. A non-profit organization, the Ensemble Theatre also has an educational touring program and a summer young performers training program.

The Ensemble's mission is to preserve African-American artistic expression. To do so, it collaborates with and presents works by artists such as Joseph A. Walker, Pearl Cleage, Cheryl L. West and Shay Youngblood.

Though the Ensemble is an African-American run troupe, it is colorblind when it comes to welcoming directors, designers, performers, playwrights and audiences. Pulitzer Prize-winning playwright August Wilson has visited the Ensemble, and influential dramatist Ntozake Shange has directed the troupe. Performers Ossie Davis and Ruby Dee have also offered their support to the company.

In August 2006, the Ensemble announced its selection of Eileen J. Morris as its new artistic director. As the artistic airector, Morris will manage the Ensemble's repertoire of six main stage productions, an aggressive tour education program, a young performers program and other projects to advance the artistic mission of the theatre.

== See also ==
- National Black Theatre
- History of African Americans in Houston
