= Ensemble/HCC station =

Light rail station Houston, Texas, US

Ensemble/HCC
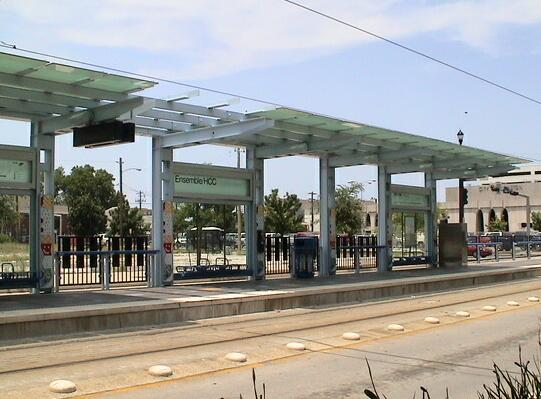

General information
- Location: Northbound: 3509 Main Street; Southbound: 3604 Main Street; Houston, Texas
- Coordinates: 29°44′21.96″N 95°22′43.62″W
- Owner: Metropolitan Transit Authority of Harris County
- Line: Red Line
- Platforms: Two island platforms
- Tracks: Two
- Connections: METRO: 9, 82, 291

Construction
- Structure type: At-grade
- Accessible: Yes

History
- Opened: January 1, 2004; 22 years ago

Services
Preceding station	METRORail	Following station
Wheeler toward Fannin South	Red Line	McGowen toward Northline Transit Center/HCC
Location

Ensemble/HCC is a light rail station in Houston, Texas, United States. The station is operated by the Metropolitan Transit Authority of Harris County (METRO) and serves the Red Line of its METRORail system.

The station is located in the Midtown neighborhood at the intersection of Main and Berry Street. (Note: The station is located within both the Midtown Super Neighborhood and the Midtown Management District.) The station is adjacent to The Ensemble Theatre and two blocks west of Houston Community College Central Campus, which together give the station its name.

== History ==
In 2001, METRO broke ground on its first light rail line, which passed through Midtown along Main Street. Plans for the line included a station at Berry Street due to its proximity to a Houston Community College campus.

METRO staff tentatively named the station Berry/HCC. Following this, two local organizations, namely The Ensemble Theatre and Trinity Episcopal Church, requested that their names be incorporated into the station, proposing the name Holman/HCC/Ensemble/Trinity. (Note: Holman Street is directly north of the station.) The proposal had the support of Houston mayor Lee Brown. Due to concerns about the name's length, the METRO board ultimately settled on Ensemble/HCC, which was approved by a 4–3 vote. This was the only station name that was changed from METRO's original proposal.

The station was opened on January 1, 2004, as one of sixteen inaugural METRORail stations. An opening ceremony at the station featured jazz music, theatrical performances, tours of Trinity Episcopal Church, and a live remote broadcast by KMJQ.

In 2007, METRO purchased two blocks of land on the western side of the station for $7.2 million. The land was purchased on behalf of developer RHS Interests, who planned to build a transit-oriented development on the site.

In April 2013, a BCycle bike sharing kiosk was installed at the station.
