= Texas Medical Center Transit Center =

Light rail and bus station in Houston, Texas, US

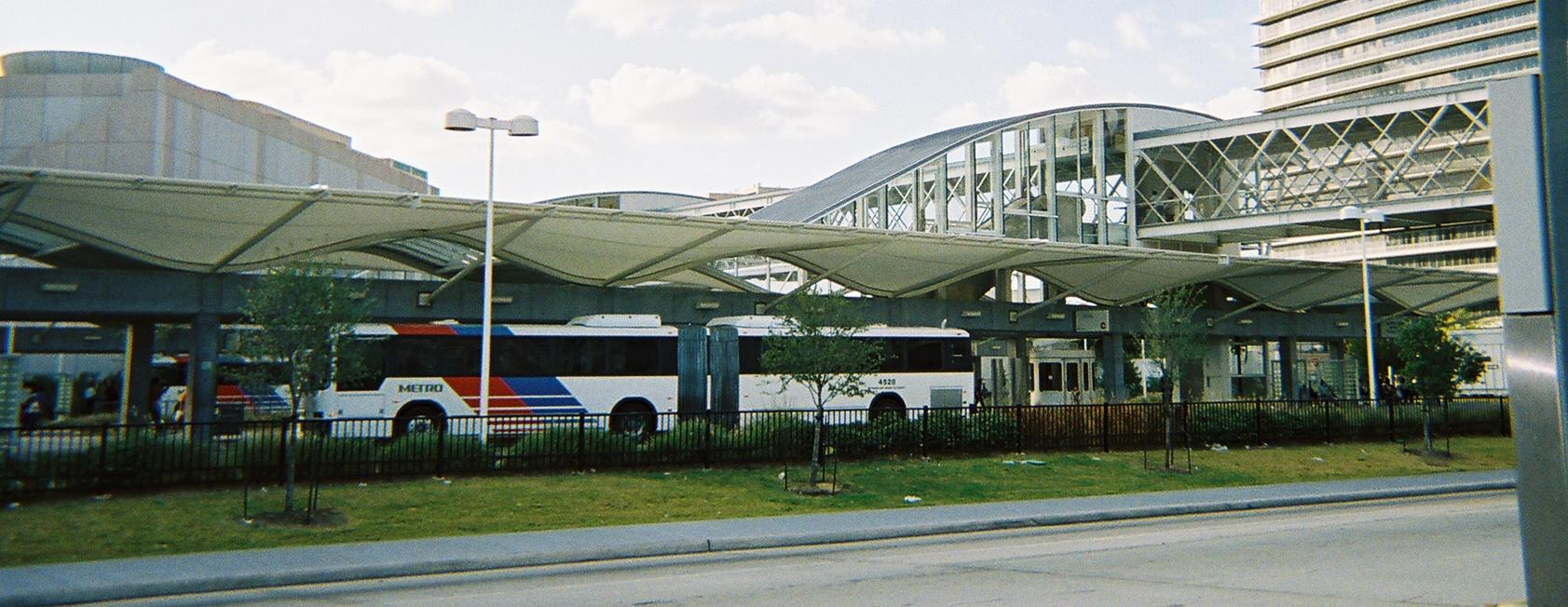
- TMC Transit Center bus platforms, with pedestrian overpass visible on right

General information
- Location: Rail: 6934 Fannin Street; Bus: 6910 Fannin Street; Houston, Texas
- Coordinates: 29°42′14.97″N 95°24′10.33″W
- Owner: Metropolitan Transit Authority of Harris County
- Line: Red Line
- Platforms: Island platform
- Tracks: 2
- Bus stands: 16
- Connections: METRO: 2, 4, 10, 14, 27, 28, 41, 56, 60, 68, 84, 87; METRO Park & Ride: 292, 297, 298; METRO Quickline: 402

Construction
- Structure type: At-grade
- Cycle facilities: 12 parking spaces
- Accessible: Yes

History
- Opened: January 1, 2004; 22 years ago

Services
Preceding station	METRORail	Following station
Smith Lands toward Fannin South	Red Line	Dryden/TMC toward Northline Transit Center/HCC
Location

Texas Medical Center Transit Center (TMC Transit Center) is an intermodal transit center in the Texas Medical Center neighborhood of Houston, Texas, United States. The transit center is operated by the Metropolitan Transit Authority of Harris County (METRO), serving the Red Line of its METRORail system, thirteen bus routes (including Bellaire Quickline), and three shuttles to METRO park-and-ride.

The transit center is located in the southern portion of Texas Medical Center near the intersection of Holcombe Boulevard and Fannin Street. It consists of an island rail platform in the median of Fannin Street and sixteen bus bays on the west side of the street with a pedestrian overpass connecting them.

== History ==
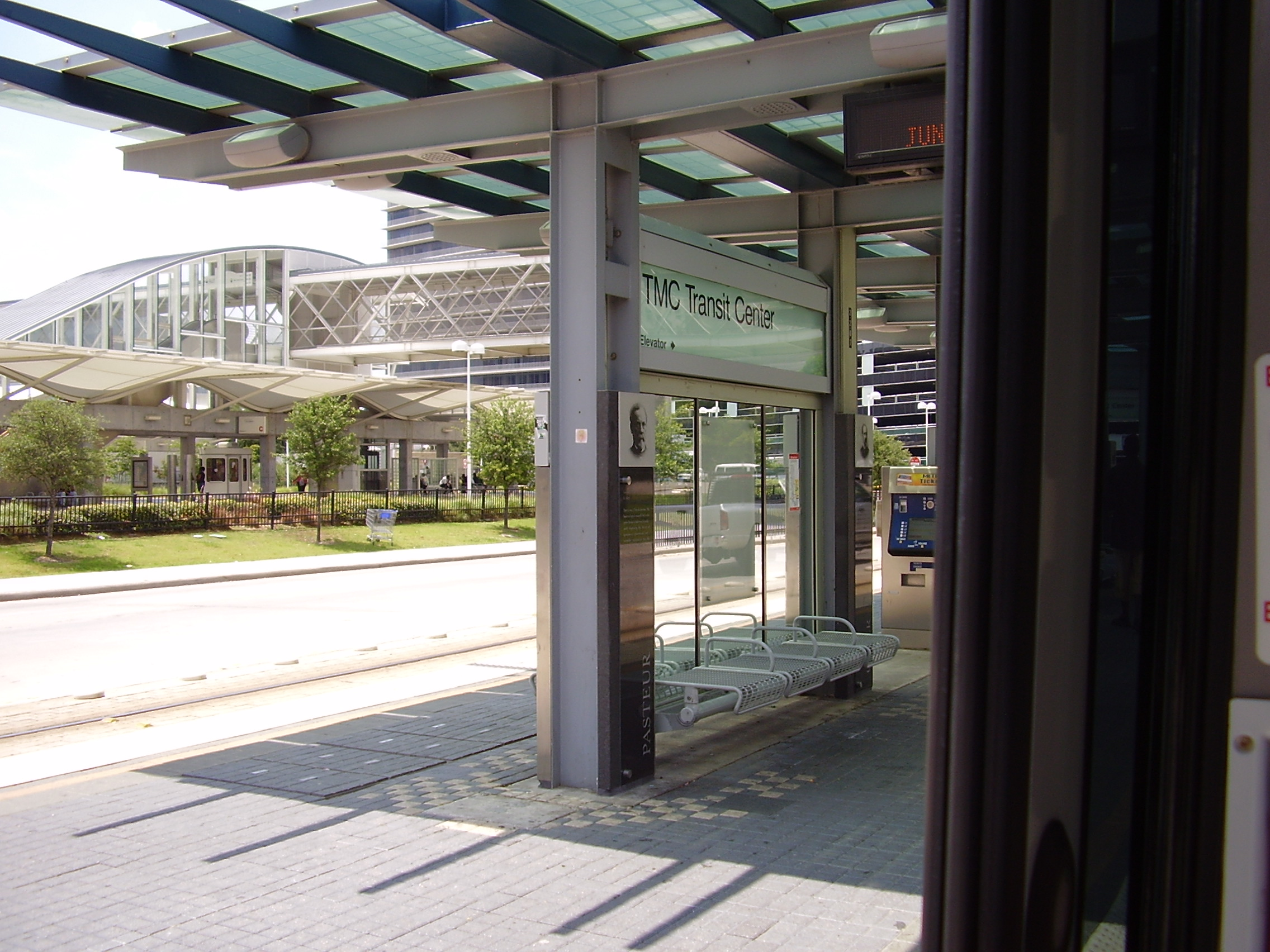
Light rail platforms at TMC Transit Center

Due to its status as one of Houston's largest employment areas, rail service to Texas Medical Center has been considered since the 1980s. A 1987 plan proposed a $1 billion, 20-mile (32 km) starter rail system with two lines, one of which connected TMC with Downtown Houston. The area was also served by a large number of bus routes.

When rail planning was re-started in 1999, the proposed line ran from Downtown to the Astrodome, passing through TMC along Fannin Street. Three stations within TMC were proposed, including a new transit center that served the area's existing bus routes.

A groundbreaking was held for the transit center in late 2002. It was built at a cost of $9.2 million and was the largest METRO transit center at the time. The transit center's rail platforms opened with the Red Line on January 1, 2004, while the bus platforms opened a month later on February 15.

At opening, the pedestrian overpass between the rail and bus platforms was accessible by stair or elevator. In 2005, in response to higher-than-expected ridership, METRO approved the installation of escalators for the overpass.

=== Proposed developments ===
TMC Transit Center's bus platforms were designed to accommodate development above them. The first such proposal was made in early 2004, where Baxter Development proposed a six-story garage, which would include 1,200 parking spaces and 20,000 square feet (1,900 m^{2}) of retail space on the ground floor. While the proposal was recommended by METRO staff, it was rejected by the board, who were concerned that the garage would be used by TMC employees, potentially decreasing ridership on the new line.

In 2005, METRO began soliciting developers for a transit-oriented development project at TMC Transit Center. METRO selected developer Transwestern, who planned a $105 million project containing a 175-room hotel, 30 condominiums, 35,000 square feet (3,300 m^{2}) of retail space, and 168,000 square feet (15,600 m^{2}) of medical offices. Construction was scheduled to begin in 2006. However, the project was quietly cancelled.

In 2011, Kirksey Architecture announced plans to build a 65,000-square-foot (6,000 m^{2}) complex on top of the transit center. This project was also unsuccessful.
