= Montrose station (Houston) =

Montrose

General information
- Owner: METRO
- Line: University Line

History
- Opening: 2030

Proposed services (2030)
Preceding station	METRORapid	Following station
Menil toward Westchase Park and Ride	University Line	Wheeler toward Tidwood Transit Center

Montrose Station is a planned station on the Houston METRORail's future University/Blue Line in Houston, Texas, United States. The University/Blue Line will serve the southern portion of the Neartown area as well as the University of St. Thomas.

== Content ==
https://web.archive.org/web/20100622013029/http://www.gometrorail.org/go/doc/2491/420107/.
