= Dryden/TMC station =

Light rail station in Houston, Texas, US

Dryden/TMC
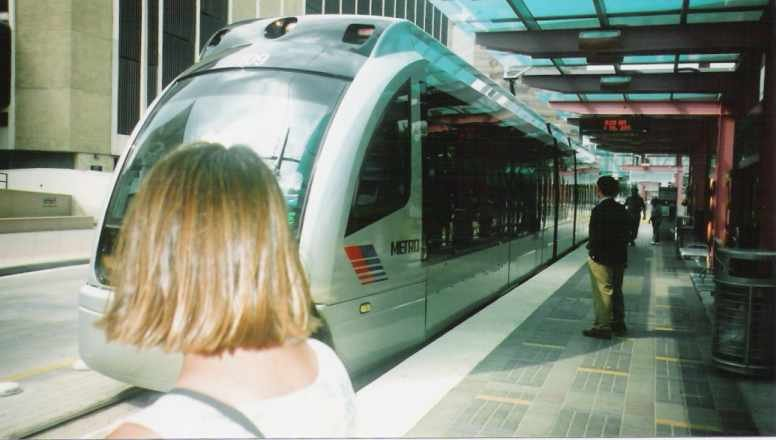
- Siemens S70 tram at the Dryden/TMC station in 2004.

General information
- Location: Northbound: 6607 Fannin Street; Southbound: 6614 Fannin Street
- Coordinates: 29°42′36.64″N 95°24′1.91″W
- Owner: Metropolitan Transit Authority of Harris County
- Line: Red Line
- Platforms: 2 island platforms
- Tracks: 2
- Connections: METRO: 56, 84

Construction
- Accessible: Yes

History
- Opened: January 1, 2004; 22 years ago

Services
Preceding station	METRORail	Following station
Texas Medical Center Transit Center toward Fannin South	Red Line	Memorial Hermann Hospital/Houston Zoo toward Northline Transit Center/HCC
Location

Dryden/TMC station is a METRORail light rail station in the Texas Medical Center (TMC) neighborhood of Houston, Texas, United States. The station serves the Red Line and two bus routes. It is located in central TMC at the intersection of Fannin Street and Dryden Road near Houston Methodist Hospital and Texas Children's Hospital.

As of May 2025, Dryden/TMC has the highest weekday ridership of all METRORail stations, with an average of 3,142 riders.

The station was opened on January 1, 2004.
