= METRORapid University Line =

Planned bus rapid transit line in Houston, Texas

University Line

Overview
- Operator: Metropolitan Transit Authority of Harris County
- Status: Proposed
- Began service: Starting 2029 or later

Route
- Locale: Houston, Texas
- Termini: Westchase Park and Ride; Tidwell Transit Center
- Length: 25 mi (40 km)
- Stations: 39

The University Line was a planned 25 mi (40 km) bus rapid transit route that would be operated by Metro in Houston, Texas, United States. It replaced a former METRORail light rail line that was proposed in the 2000s and 2010s. The University Line was scheduled to begin construction in 2025 and would have been built in five sections between Westchase Park and Ride, Uptown, the University of Houston, and Tidwell Transit Center. In 2024 the project was postponed indefinitely.

The name of the line is in reference to the fact that the line is planned to go through all of the main universities in Houston (Rice, University of St. Thomas, University of Houston, and Texas Southern).

== History ==
The METRO Solutions Transit System Plan (aka Metro Solutions Plan) was placed before voters on the November 4, 2003, ballot. One of the six proposed light rail segments as a Phase 2 to expand the Main Street line, then under construction, was the "Westpark" corridor, extending from the existing Wheeler station west to Hillcroft; 6.6 mi (10.6 km) and 4 stations. After the passage of the measure, METRO introduced plans for the University (renamed from Westpark) line as part of Phase 2 of the Metro Solutions Plan in June 2004.

=== Opposition ===
Alarmed by the disruption to businesses along Main Street during the construction of the Main Street line, Richmond Avenue business owners formed a coalition in 2004 and met with METRO, urging the agency to move the route to Westheimer Road. METRO countered the lessons it had learned while building the Main Street line would be applied to the construction of the University line, and further, the route had not yet been finalized; options included alignment along Westpark, Westheimer, or the Southwest Freeway.

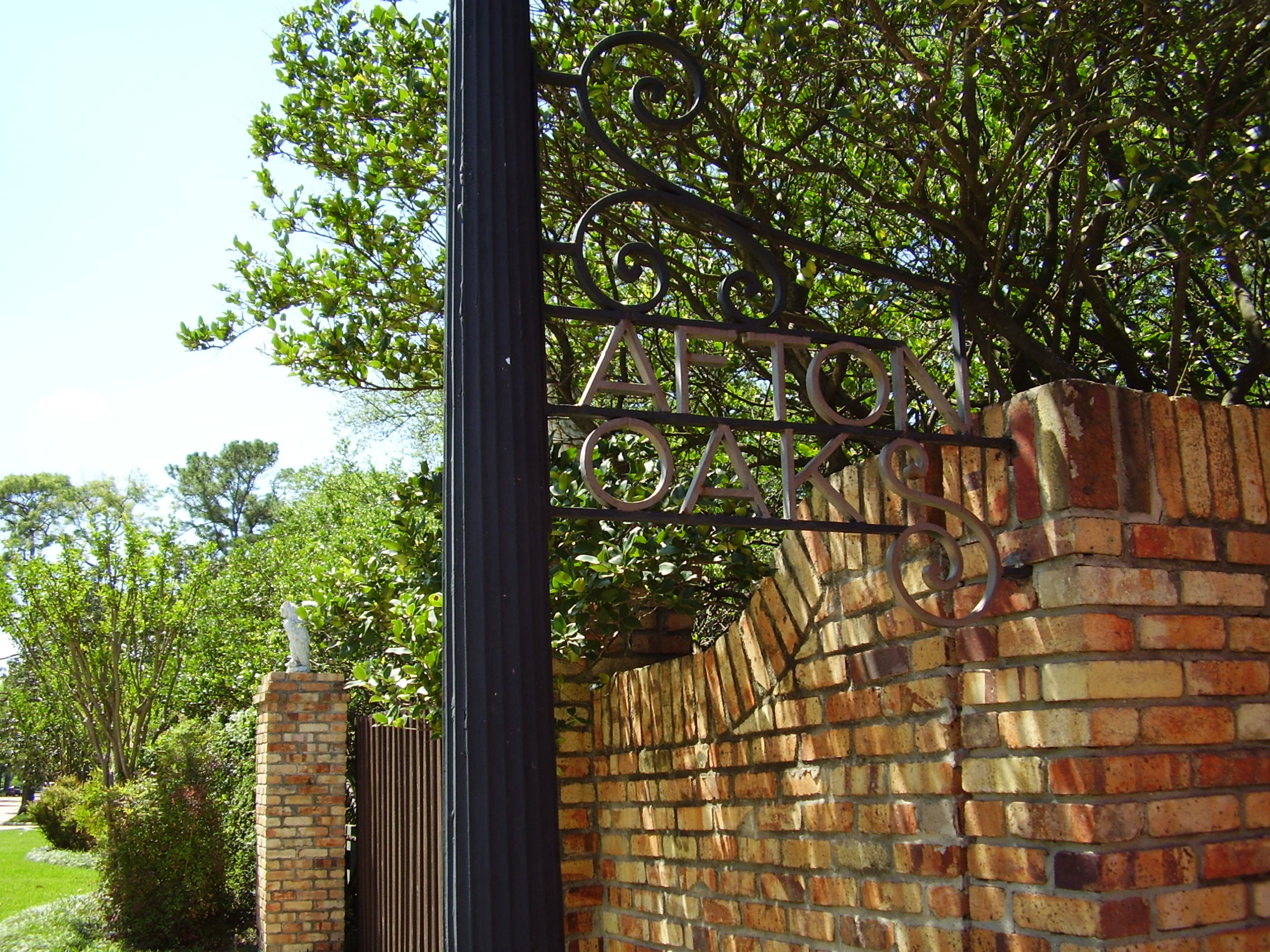
The homeowners of Afton Oaks opposed plans for the University Line to go through the subdivision

The homeowners of the upper-income Afton Oaks subdivision opposed a proposed expansion of the University Line through the neighborhood. Ultimately METRO revised the plans so that the line does not go through the neighborhood.

An opinion was issued August 31, 2010, on an appeal made by Daphne Scarbrough, who owns a business on Richmond Avenue, on a lawsuit she raised May 23, 2007, regarding METRO's jurisdiction and its decision to align the rail down the center of Richmond. The appeal overruled all but one issue raised by Scarbrough (which it modified), upholding the original decision to give METRO jurisdiction on Richmond to lay the rails.

=== Alignment issues ===
In a 2007 Houston Chronicle questions and answers page about the proposed University Line, Daphne Scarbrough and Christof Spieler asked why METRO did not include a station to serve Gulfton, a community of apartment complexes. METRO responded, saying that the agency originally envisioned "more of an express service" in that area. However, the agency stated that it would examine the idea of including a Gulfton Station in the project scope.

=== Postponement ===
In 2010, Houston mayor Annise Parker delayed construction on the University Line in an effort to find a suitable funding source.

However, the line has received some hope: METRO has reported to the local media outlets that it has received a federal Record of Decision, the final approval needed to design and/or construct the line. It is reported in the Houston Chronicle that METRO anticipates $700 million in federal funding for this line. While Go METRORail has no mention of this, METRO Solutions has posted a .pdf file of the letter from the FTA with all permission, and an inclusion of instructions to not pursue buying any light rail vehicles for this line (or for any other for that matter) until the investigation regarding the controversy over "Buy America" has concluded.

In May 2016, the project had its federal funding eligibility revoked after a decade of inactivity.

The line was again postponed in 2024 following the election of pro-car-centric John Whitmire as Mayor.

== Route ==
The route begins in the west at the Hillcroft Transit Center traveling east on the Westpark right-of-way that METRO owns. A stop in the Gulfton neighborhood (which contains several apartment complexes that primarily house working-class Hispanic and immigrant populations) may be added.

Continuing east, it will come to the transfer location with the Uptown/Gold Line at Bellaire/South Rice. Moving eastward will pass stops at Newcastle and Weslayan before crossing over I-69/US 59 to the Cummins Station. Moving onto Richmond Avenue, the University Line will make stops at Greenway Plaza, Kirby Drive, Shepherd Drive, Dunlavy Street, and Montrose Boulevard.

Transfers to the Red Line will occur at Wheeler Station. Traveling eastbound on Wheeler, it will approach Almeda Station and then continue to go underneath SH 288. Shortly after, the line will travel northward on Hutchins and make a stop there. After making turns onto Cleburne, Dowling, and then Alabama, the University Line will stop at Texas Southern University and at Tierwester Street. After approaching Scott Street and turning northward at the University of Houston, the line will share tracks with the Purple Line for a short distance before turning onto Elgin, the transfer station to the Purple Line, and then onward to Cullen through the University of Houston and the new terminus, as determined by Go METRORail September 2010, the Eastwood Transit Center.

== Stations ==
The following is a list of proposed stations for the University Line, listed in order from west to east:

University/Blue Line
Hillcroft Transit Center
Gulfton Station
Bellaire/South Rice Station*
Newcastle Station
Weslayan Station
Cummins Station
Edloe Station
Kirby Station
Shepherd Station
Menil Station
Montrose Station
Wheeler Station**
Almeda Station
Hutchins Station
TSU Station
Tierwester Station
TSU/UH Athletics District Station***
Elgin Station***
Cullen Station
Eastwood Transit Center

*Note: Station shared with Uptown/Gold Line to provide transfers between the two lines

**Note: Station shared with Red Line to provide transfers between the two lines

***Note: Station shared with Southeast/Purple Line to provide transfers between the two lines

== Expansion ==
One possible future expansion would continue westward from the Hillcroft Transit Center along the right-of-way METRO owns just south of the Westpark Tollway, which would presumably serve the Sharpstown, Westchase and Alief districts. The other expansion that is being considered would continue past Elgin to the Eastwood Transit Center.
