= METRORapid Silver Line =

Bus rapid transit line in Houston, Texas, U.S.

Silver Line
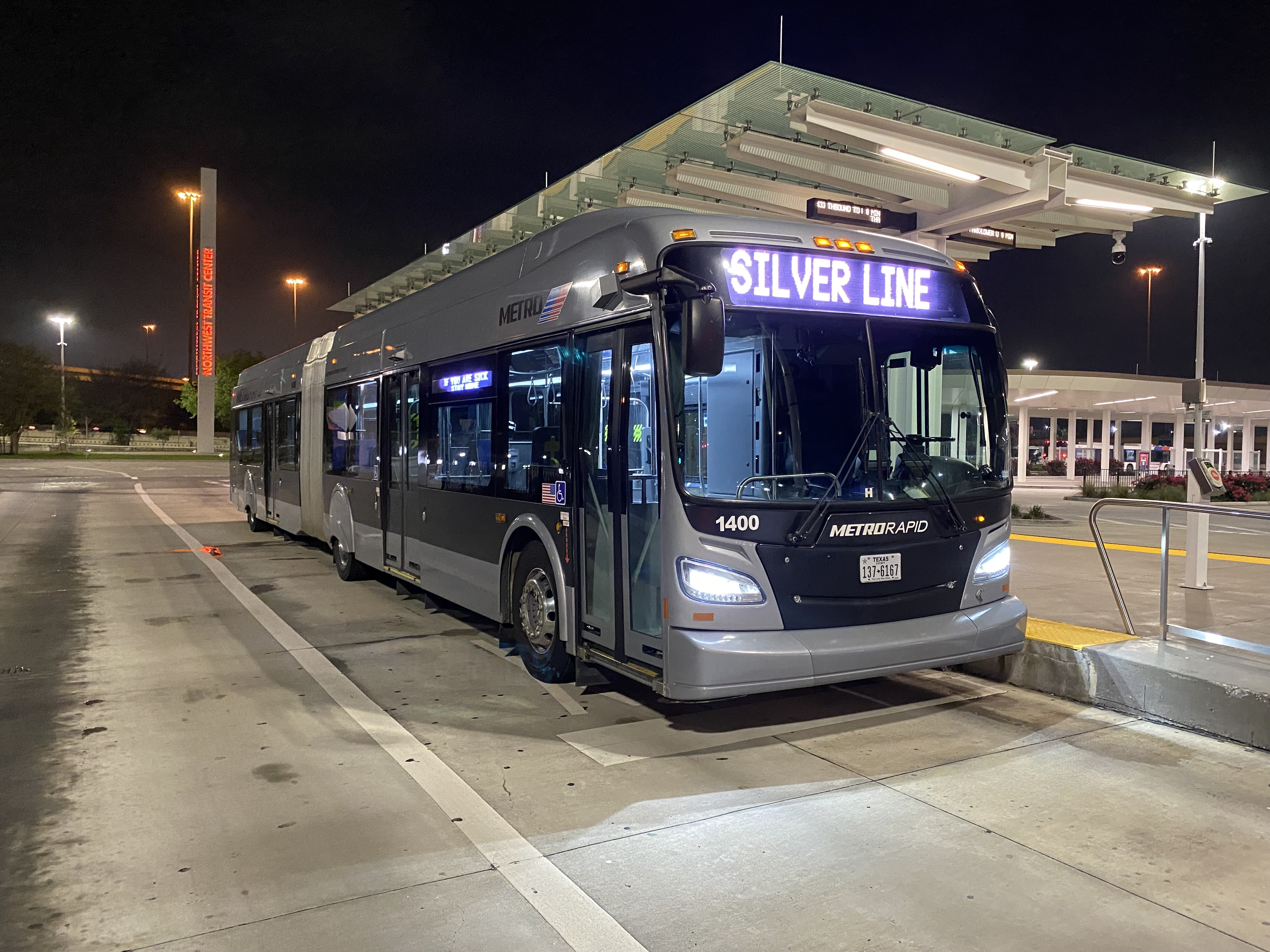
- Silver Line bus at the Northwest Transit Center

Overview
- Status: Operational
- Locale: Houston, Texas
- Termini: Northwest Transit Center (north); Westpark/Lower Uptown Transit Center (south)
- Stations: 10

Service
- Type: Bus rapid transit
- System: METRORapid
- Services: Route 433
- Operator: METRO
- Depot: Fallbrook
- Rolling stock: Gillig BRT CNG
- Daily ridership: 1,012 (weekdays, June 2024)

History
- Opened: August 23, 2020; 6 years ago

Technical
- Line length: 4.7 mi (7.6 km)

The METRORapid Silver Line is a bus rapid transit (BRT) line in Houston, Texas operated by METRO. Opened August 23, 2020, the line connects the Uptown area of Houston, with dedicated lanes over nearly the entire length of the corridor. It serves the Northwest Transit Center, 8 stations along Post Oak Boulevard in Uptown, and the Westpark/Lower Uptown Transit Center. On internal METRO documents, the METRORapid Silver Line is designated as Route 433.

The line was originally planned as a 4.7-mile (7.6 km) extension of the METRORail light rail network under the name Uptown/Gold Line. Due to lack of funds, it was announced in early 2013 that the line would be constructed initially as a bus rapid transit line using three-door buses. The design features the ability to convert the line to light rail in the future.

The Silver Line is the first segment of a planned 75 mile network of bus rapid transit service in Houston, branded as METRORapid.

== Route ==
The Silver Line runs between Westpark/Lower Uptown Transit Center, a park and ride facility located on Westpark Drive near the Located at the Southwest Freeway (I-69/US 59) & West Loop (I-610), and Northwest Transit Center, located at Katy Road on the north side of the I-10 interchange. This corridor was previously served by Route 33. Silver Line buses serve eight stations via bus-only lanes in the median of Post Oak Boulevard through the Uptown area. These lanes connect to the Northwest Transit Center with an elevated two-lane busway along the West Loop portion of Interstate 610.

== History ==
Following a statement in 2010 by Houston's mayor, Annise Parker, construction would commence at a time when funding can be secured for this line. Furthermore, due to the lack of infrastructure upgrades promised by the Uptown Management District, METRO would hold off on anything related to the line until a deal was arranged.

The light rail project was repeatedly blocked by Congressman John Culberson, based on concerns from constituents on Richmond Avenue. It was downgraded to a $177.5 million bus rapid transit project with dedicated lanes in 2013, under a plan promoted by Uptown developers to receive improved transit service sooner than the estimated 2025 arrival of light rail.

Construction began in 2016 with the line's opening planned for 2018. However, the project faced several delays before service began in 2020. Its service, originally with buses every 12 minutes, was reduced to every 20 minutes on June 16, 2024. The service change also reallocated the Silver Line's articulated buses to other routes with higher demand.

== Stations ==
Listed from north to south:

Station	Location	Connections	Notes
Northwest Transit Center	7373 Old Katy Road	Metro Local	Park and ride: 195 spaces
Uptown Park	Post Oak and Uptown Park Boulevards		Serves Uptown Park shopping center
Four Oaks	Post Oak and Four Oaks Place		
San Felipe	Post Oak and San Felipe Street	Metro Local	Serves Boulevard Place
Ambassador	Post Oak and Ambassador Way		
Guilford	Post Oak and Guilford Court		
Westheimer/Galleria	Post Oak and Westheimer Road	Metro Local	Serves The Galleria
West Alabama/Galleria	Post Oak and West Alabama Street		Serves The Galleria and Williams Tower
Richmond	Post Oak and Richmond Avenue	Metro Local	Serves Plaza on Richmond
Westpark/Lower Uptown Transit Center	5105 Westpark Drive	Metro Local	Park and ride: 242 spaces

== Expansion ==
An 1.1-mile (1.8 km) extension north to Northwest Mall—(a future Texas Central Railway station)—and a western extension to the Hillcroft Transit Center have been proposed.

A separate METRORapid line from Westpark/Lower Uptown Transit Center through Gulfton to Hillcroft & Bissonet (with another proposed extension to Downtown Transit Center following Westheimer Road) has been proposed as part of the Gulfton Revitalization project and is currently in the development stage.
