= List of breweries in Texas =

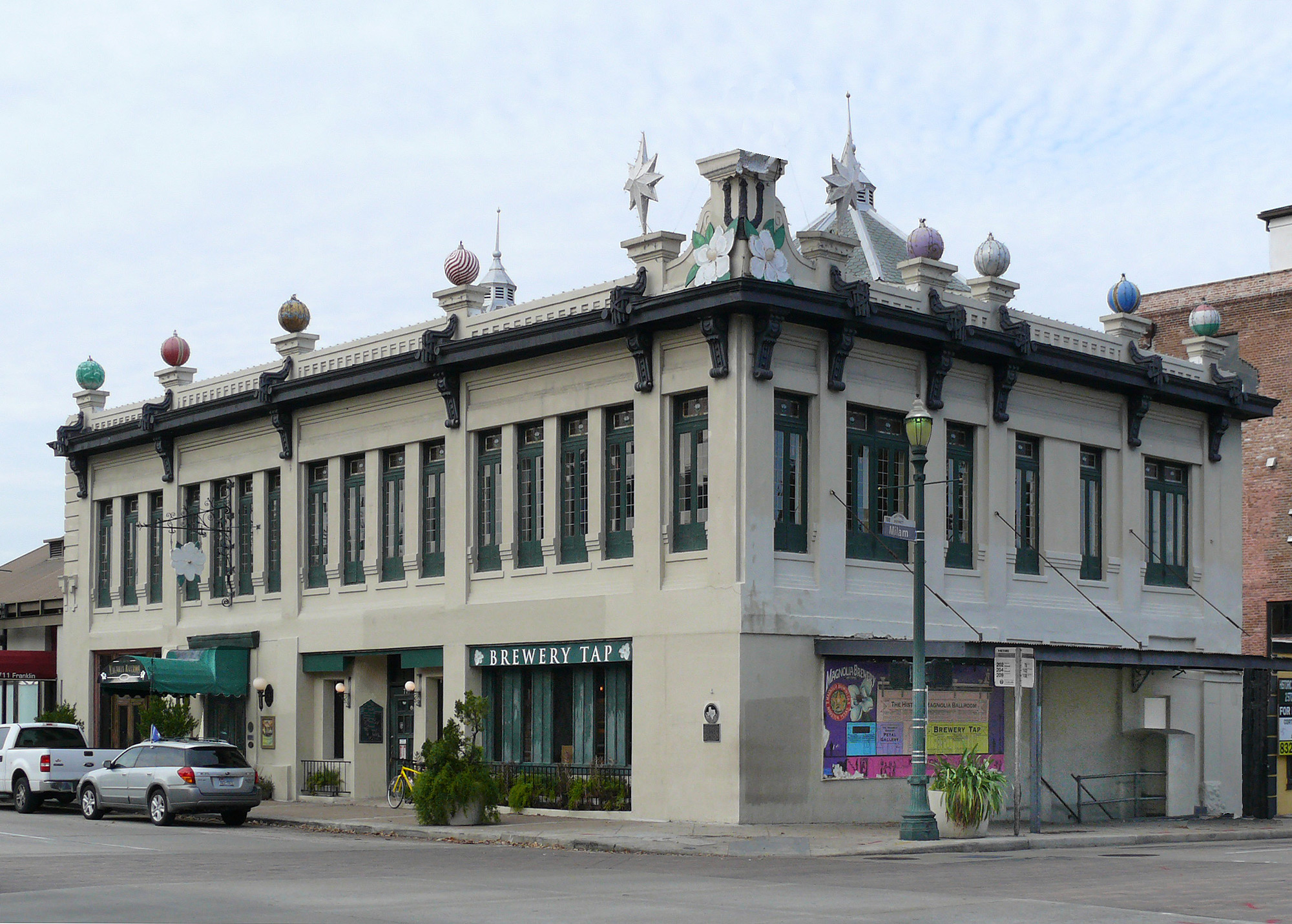
The Magnolia Brewery Building in Houston was built in 1912.

This is a list of breweries in Texas.

== Breweries and microbreweries ==
Brewery	Location	Founded	Distribution	On-site	Notes
8th Wonder Brewery	Houston	2013	Cans	Taproom	
903 Brewers	Sherman	2013	Cans	Taproom	
11 Below Brewery	Spring	2015	Cans	Taproom	
Alamo Beer Company	San Antonio	2015	Bottles		
Austin Beer Garden Brewing Company	Austin	2013	Kegs	Brewpub	
Austin Beerworks	Austin	2011	Cans	Taproom	
Austin Eastciders	Austin	2013	Cans, Kegs	Taproom	
Anheuser-Busch Brewery	Houston	1966			Annual production of 12 million barrels as of 2013
B-52 Brewing Company	Conroe	2014	Kegs, cans, bottles	Taproom	Barrel-aged beers. Ranked #5 in 2019 Texas Craft Beer Report
Bad Astronaut Brewery	Houston	2022	Kegs, Cans	Taproom	
Bare Arms Brewing	Waco	2015	Kegs	Taproom, crowlers, kegs	
Barrow Brewing Company	Salado	2016	Kegs, cans, growlers	Taproom	
Blackwater Draw Brewing Co.	Bryan	2010	Kegs, Cans, Bottles	Taproom	
Blue Owl Brewing	Austin	2015	Cans		
Bold Republic Brewing Company	Belton	2018		Taproom	
Brazos Valley Brewery	Brenham	2014			
Blind Boar					
Buffalo Bayou Brewing Company	Houston	2011	Cans		
Cactus Land Brewing Company	Adkins	2016	Bottles; cans	taproom	
Cedar Creek Brewery	Seven Points	2012	Cans	brewpub	
Celis Brewery	Austin	1992	Bottles; cans	taproom	
Circle Brewing Company	Austin	2010	Cans	Taproom	
Community Beer Company	Dallas	2013	Bottles, Cans, Kegs	Taproom	
Cypress Creek Southern Ales	Winnsboro	2018	Kegs	Taproom	
Deep Ellum Brewing	Dallas	2011	Bottles; cans	taproom	
ETX Brewing Company	Tyler	2017	Kegs, Cans	Brewpub	
Eureka Heights Brewing Company	Houston	2016	Kegs	Brewpub	
Franconia Brewing Company	McKinney	2008	Bottles, Kegs		
Fredonia Brewery	Nacogdoches	2016	kegs; cans	taproom	Only Brewery in the Oldest Town in Texas
Freetail Brewing Company	San Antonio	2008	Bottles; cans	Brewpub; brewery with taproom	
Friends & Allies Brewing	Austin	2016	Cans	taproom	
Four Corners Brewing	Dallas	2012	Cans	taproom	
Galveston Bay Brewing	Dickinson	2014	Kegs, Cans	Taproom	
Galveston Island Brewing	Galveston	2014	Kegs, Cans	Taproom	
Holler Brewing Company	Houston	2016	Kegs	Taproom	
Hops & Grain Brewery	Austin	2011	Cans	taproom	
HopFusion Ale Works	Fort Worth	2016	Cans	taproom	
Hopsquad Brewing Company	Austin	2019	Cans	taproom	
Independence Brewing Co.	Austin	2004	Kegs, Cans, Bottles	Taproom	Distributes to Arkansas
Intrinsic Smokehouse & Brewery	Garland	2015		Brewpub	
Jester King Brewery	Austin	2010		Taproom	
Karbach Brewing Company	Houston	2011	Bottles; cans	brewpub	
Krootz Brewing Company	Gainesville	2019	Kegs; Cans	Brewpub	Scratch kitchen, live entertainment, regional distribution
Künstler Brewing	San Antonio	2017		brewpub	
Lakewood Brewing Company	Garland	2011	Bottles; cans	taproom	
Live Oak Brewing Company	Austin	1997	Draft; cans	taproom	
Lone Pint Brewing Company	Magnolia	2012	Bottles		
Martin House Brewing Company	Fort Worth	2013	Cans	taproom	
Meanwhile Brewing	Austin	2020		Taproom	
Middleton Brewing	San Marcos	2011		Taproom	
MillerCoors Brewery	Fort Worth	1966			Lone Star is made by Miller at the Fort Worth brewery. The Lone Star brand is owned by Pabst Brewing Company.
New Republic Brewing Company	College Station	2011	Kegs, Cans, Bottles	Taproom, Beer Garden	Barrel-aged beers
No Label Brewing Company	Katy	2010	Bottles	taproom	
NLand Brewing Company	Austin	2017	Kegs	taproom	
On Rotation Brewery & Kitchen	Dallas	2015	Kegs, Cans, Crowlers	Brewpub	Small batch craft beers brewed in-house with guest taps, scratch kitchen, trivia night, reverse happy hour, luxurious dog-friendly patio, located outside Love Field
Panther Island Brewing	Fort Worth	2014	Cans, Kegs	Taproom	
Pegasus City Brewery	Dallas	2017	Kegs, Cans	taproom	
Peticolas Brewing Company	Dallas	2011	Kegs, Cans	taproom	Grand National Champion at the 2018 U.S. Open Beer Championship.
Rahr and Sons Brewing Company	Fort Worth	2004	Bottles		
Ranger Creek Brewing & Distilling	San Antonio	2010	Cans, bottles	Taproom, tours	
Real Ale Brewing Company	Blanco	1996	Cans, Bottles	taproom	
Revolver Brewing	Granbury	2012	Bottles		
Rogness Brewing Company	Austin	2012	Bottles	taproom	
Saint Arnold Brewing Company	Houston	1994	Cans; bottles	brewpub	First modern craft brewery in Texas
Saloon Door Brewing	Webster	2015	Cans	taproom	"Best Draw in the West" makers of TASTY AF
Shannon Brewing Company	Keller	2014	Cans	taproom	
Southerleigh Fine Food & Brewery	San Antonio	2015	Bottles	brewpub	
Southern Star Brewing Company	Conroe	2007	Cans	taproom	
Spoetzl Brewery	Shiner	1909	Bottles; cans	Tours	Makers of Shiner beer
StarBase Brewing	Austin	2022	Bottles; cans	Tours	Makers of StarHopped Hazy India Pale Ale
Texas Beer Company	Taylor	2016	Cans, Kegs	Taproom	In the historic McCrory-Timmerman building at 2nd and Main Street in Taylor.
Texas Beer Refinery	Dickinson	2013	Bottles	taproom	
Texian Brewing Company	Richmond	2012	Kegs; bottles		
Thirsty Planet Brewing Company	Austin	2010	Bottles; Kegs		Makers of Thirsty Goat Amber & Buckethead IPA. Tasting Room coming in 2019.
True Vine Brewing Company	Tyler	2014	cans	Taproom	
TUPPS Brewery	McKinney	2015	Kegs, Cans	Taproom	
Twin Peaks Brewing Company	Irving	2014	Cans		Produces kegs for the Twin Peaks restaurant chain.
Under the Radar Brewery	Houston	2016	Kegs	Taproom	
Westlake Brewing Company	Dallas	2019	Kegs, Cans	Taproom	Located in Deep Ellum. 2021 GABF Gold-Medal Winner

== Former breweries ==
Brewery	Location	Founded	Dissolved
Adelbert's Brewery	Austin	2011	2022
Alamo Brewing Association	San Antonio	1888	1893
Behloradsky Brewery^{B}	San Antonio	1881	1883
Big Bend Brewing Company	Alpine	2012	2018
Bosque Brewing	Waco	1995	1997
Both and Company	Weatherford		
BrainDead Brewing	Dallas	2015	2021
Charles Degen Brewery	San Antonio	1879	1911
The Collective Brewing Project	Fort Worth	2014	2020
Dallas Brewing Company	Dallas	1889	1893
Falstaff Brewing Corporation^{A}	Galveston	1955	1981
Felix Bachrach Brewery	San Antonio	1890	1890
Fort Bend Brewing Company	Missouri City	2012	2015
Frederick Probst Brewery	Fredericksburg	1874	1895
Gabel's Brewery	Houston	1849	1879
Galveston Brewing Company^{A}	Galveston	1895	1918
Galveston-Houston Brewers^{A}	Galveston	1934	1955
Giesecke and Brothers Brewery	Brenham	1877	1880
Gulf Brewing Co.	Houston	1933	1963
Gustave Franke Brewery	Meyersville	1884	1903
Herman Frank Home Brewery	Bellville	1882	1918
Ingenious Brewery Co.	Humble	2018	2024
Kreisch Brewery	La Grange	1860s	1884
Lone Star Brewery	San Antonio	1884	1918
Lorenz Ochs and George Aschbacher Brewery	San Antonio	1890	1904
Lorenz Zeiss Brewery	Brenham	1874	1884
Michael Cellmer Brewery	Yorktown	1878	1891
Pearl Brewing Company^{B}	San Antonio	1883	2001
Second Pitch Beer Company	San Antonio	2020	2024
Simon Mayer Brewery	Dallas	1895	1900
Texas Brewing Company	Fort Worth	1890	1918
Western Brewery	San Antonio	1855	1878

- ^A These breweries were housed in the same physical brewery building at 3300 Church Street in Galveston.
- ^B These breweries were housed in the same physical brewery building at 303 Pearl Parkway in San Antonio.

== See also ==
- Beer in the United States
- Microbrewery
