= Middle College Program =

The Middle College Program is a high school alternative program first established in New York. It is a collaboration between a high school district and a community college for high school students who desire a more independent learning environment. Students take a combination of core high school courses and college courses to receive their diploma and graduate.

== History of the Middle College Program ==
The first Middle College Program began as a charter high school at LaGuardia Community College. It opened in 1974 as an alternative high school under the joint auspices of the New York City Board of Education and LaGuardia Community College of the City University of New York. It was funded by grants from the Carnegie Corporation and the Fund for the Improvement for Post Secondary Education.

== List of Middle College High Schools ==
State	Name of High School	Partnered College
California	Academy of the Canyons	College of the Canyons
California	Compton Early College High School	Compton College
California	Design Science Middle College HS	Fresno City College
California	Dr. Richard A. Vladovic Harbor Teacher Preparation Academy	Los Angeles Harbor College
California	East Village Middle College High School	
California	John F. Kennedy Middle College High School	Norco College
California	Middle College High School	Contra Costa College, Los Angeles Southwest College, San Bernardino Valley College, San Joaquin Delta College, Santa Ana College
California	NOVA Academy Early College High School	Santa Ana College
California	Options Middle College High School	Southwestern College
California	Palo Alto Middle College High School	Foothill College
California	San Mateo Middle College High School	College of San Mateo
California	Washington Middle College High School	Sacramento City College
California	Westmont High School Prospect High School Branham High School Los Gatos High School Del Mar High School	West Valley College
Colorado	Dr. Martin Luther King Jr. Early College	Community College of Aurora
Connecticut	Great Path Academy	Manchester Community College
Connecticut	Three Rivers Middle College	Three Rivers Community College
Illinois	Olive-Harvey Middle College High School	Olive-Harvey College
Illinois	Truman Middle College Alternative High School	Truman College
Illinois	Danville Area Community College Middle College	Danville Area Community College
Maryland	Northwest High School	Montgomery College
Maryland	Northwood High School	Montgomery College
Maryland	Academy of Health Sciences	Prince George’s Community College
Massachusetts	New Heights Charter School of Brockton	Massasoit Community College
Michigan	Genesee Early College High School	University of Michigan-Flint
Michigan	Henry Ford Collegiate Academy Early College Henry Ford Early College Henry Ford Early College/Advanced Manufacturing	Henry Ford Community College
Michigan	Mott Middle College High School	Mott Community College
Missouri	BELIEVE Middle College	St. Louis Community College
Missouri	OTC Middle College High School	Ozarks Technical Community College
New York	Brooklyn College Academy	Brooklyn College
New York	International High SchoolMiddle College High School	LaGuardia Community College
New York	Middle Early College High School	SUNY Buffalo
Oklahoma	Academy of Seminole	Seminole State College
Oklahoma	Santa Fe South Pathways Middle College	Oklahoma City Community College
Ohio	The Charles School	Ohio Dominican University
Oregon	Clackamas Middle College	Clackamas Community College
Nevada	Truckee Meadows Community College High School	Truckee Meadows Community College
Pennsylvania	Parkway Center Middle College High School	Community College of Philadelphia
South Carolina	Brashier Middle College Charter High SchoolGreenville Technical Charter High SchoolGreer Middle College Charter High School	Greenville Technical College
Tennessee	Hollis F. Price Early College High School	LeMoyne-Owen College
Tennessee	Middle College High School	Christian Brothers University
Texas	Challenge Early College High School	Houston Community College SW
Texas	East Early College High School	Houston Community College SE
Texas	North Houston Early College High SchoolSterling Aviation Early College High School	Houston Community College
Washington	Seattle Middle College High School	
Wisconsin	Rock University High School	Blackhawk Technical College
