= Akinpelu =

Akinpelu is a given name. Notable people with the name include:

- Akinpelu Johnson (born 1965), Anglican bishop in Nigeria
- Akinpelu Obisesan (1889–1963), Nigerian diarist, businessman, and politician
- Akinpelu Oludele Adesola (1927–2010), Nigerian professor of surgery and educational administrator

== See also ==
- Jacqueline Akinpelu (born 1953), American mathematician
- Olubukola Mary Akinpelu, Nigerian-American nurse
- Promise Oluwatobi Emmanuel David Akinpelu (born 2001), Canadian soccer player
- Solape Akinpelu, Nigerian business executive
