= Northside, Houston =

District of Houston, Texas, US

Coordinates: 29.78°N 95.35°W

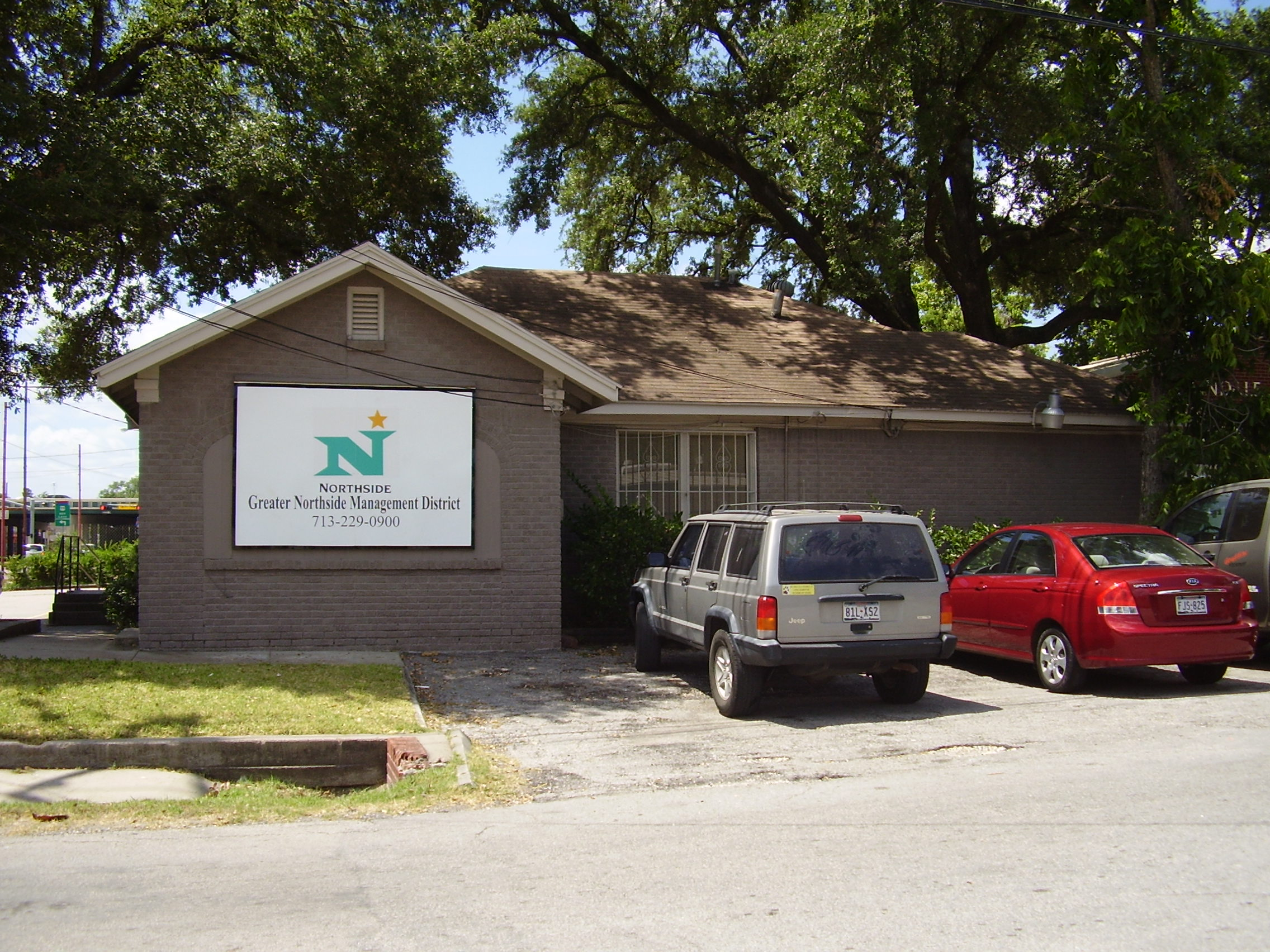
Greater Northside Management District offices

The Northside is a district of Houston, Texas, United States. It is within the Greater Northside Management District. The city-designated Near Northside Super Neighborhood includes the area south of Interstate 610, while the northern sections are designated Northside/Northline.

The area is adjacent to Greater Heights, Independence Heights, Kashmere Gardens, Fifth Ward, and Downtown.

== History ==
Historically, the neighborhood was part of Fifth Ward. Railroad tracks and the Eastex Freeway later separated the area from the rest of the ward, and the increasingly Latino neighborhood gradually developed its own identity as "Northside."

House Bill 3634, authored by state representative Jessica Farrar and sponsored in the Texas Senate by Mario Gallegos, created the Northside management district. The bill became the Chapter 3812 Texas Special Districts Local Laws Code and the district began operation in August 2006.

Jim McIngvale, the owner of Gallery Furniture, a furniture business with a location in the Northside, refused to pay $48,000 in taxes to the management district that were assessed from 2005 to 2007; he paid taxes to the district in 2008. McIngvale said that the management district does not do enough to maintain the area; the business owner described the management district's taxation policies as "taxation without representation." The district sued McIngvale to try to force him to pay the taxes. McIngvale said that he is willing to dispute the charges in court. During that month a fire destroyed his north Houston store's warehouse.

== Government and infrastructure ==
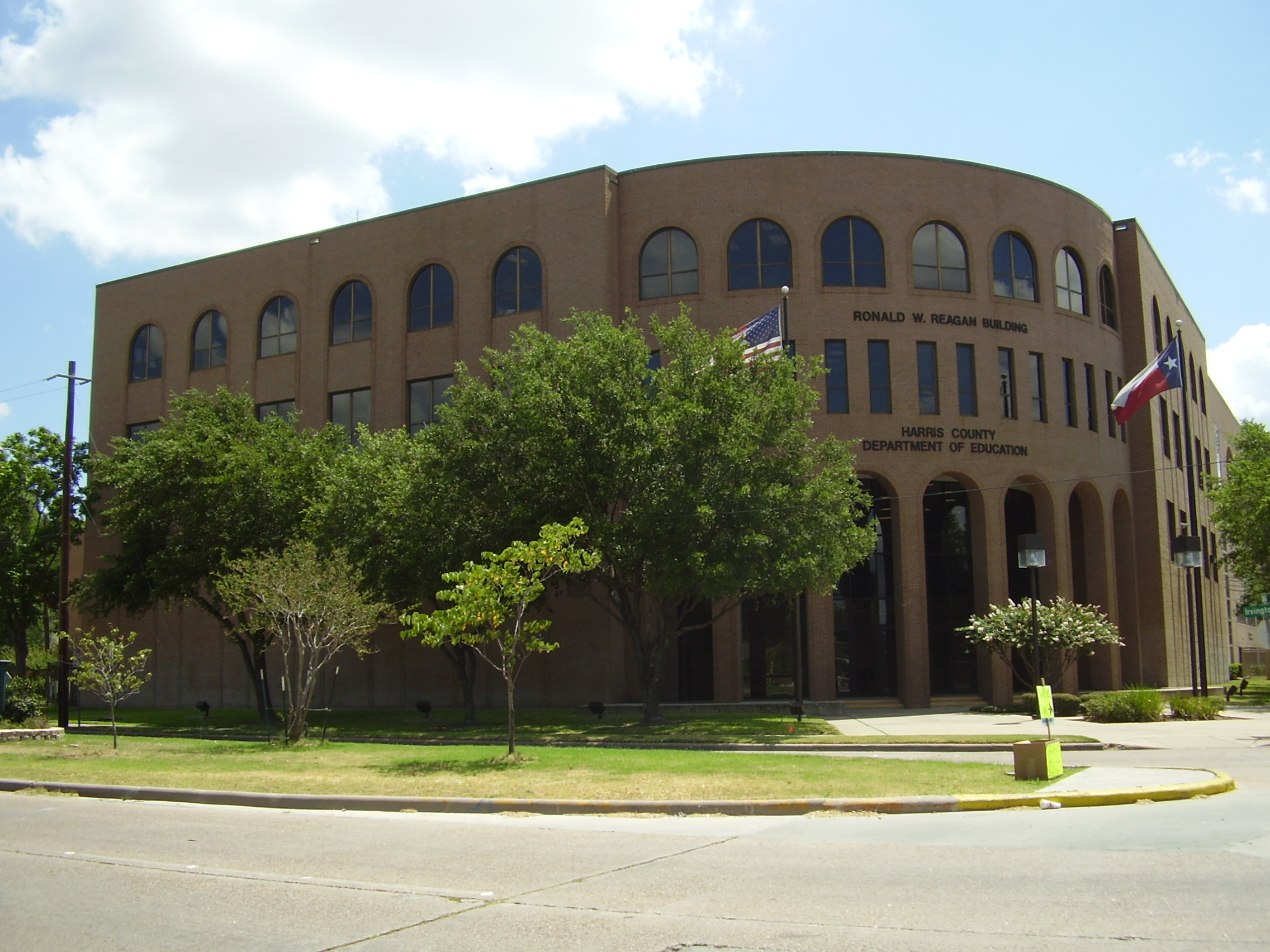
Ronald W. Reagan Building, the headquarters of the Harris County Department of Education

The management district is headquartered at 6219 Irvington Boulevard.

The Houston Fire Department operates stations in the district. Stations inside include two in Fire District 19, Station 9 Northside and Station 12 Moody Park. In addition Station 15 Heights of Fire District 6 and Station 30 Lindale Park of Fire District 31 are in the district.

The Harris County Department of Education is headquartered in Northside in the Ronald W. Reagan Building.

The Harris Health System (formerly Harris County Hospital District) Casa de Amigos ("House of Friends") Health Center is in the Near Northside. It opened on August 21, 1970 in the near Northside. The hospital system designated the Casa de Amigos clinic for the ZIP code 77009 and the Aldine Health Center for the ZIP code 77022. The designated public hospitals for these two ZIP codes are Ben Taub General Hospital in the Texas Medical Center and the Lyndon B. Johnson Hospital in northeast Houston, respectively.

The City of Houston Health Department operates two clinics in the Northside: Nueva Casa de Amigos ("New House of Friends"), and Northside.

The Houston Housing Authority (HHA) operates the following public housing complexes in Northside: Fulton Village, Heatherbrook Apartments, Irvinton Village, and Oxford Place.

== Economy ==
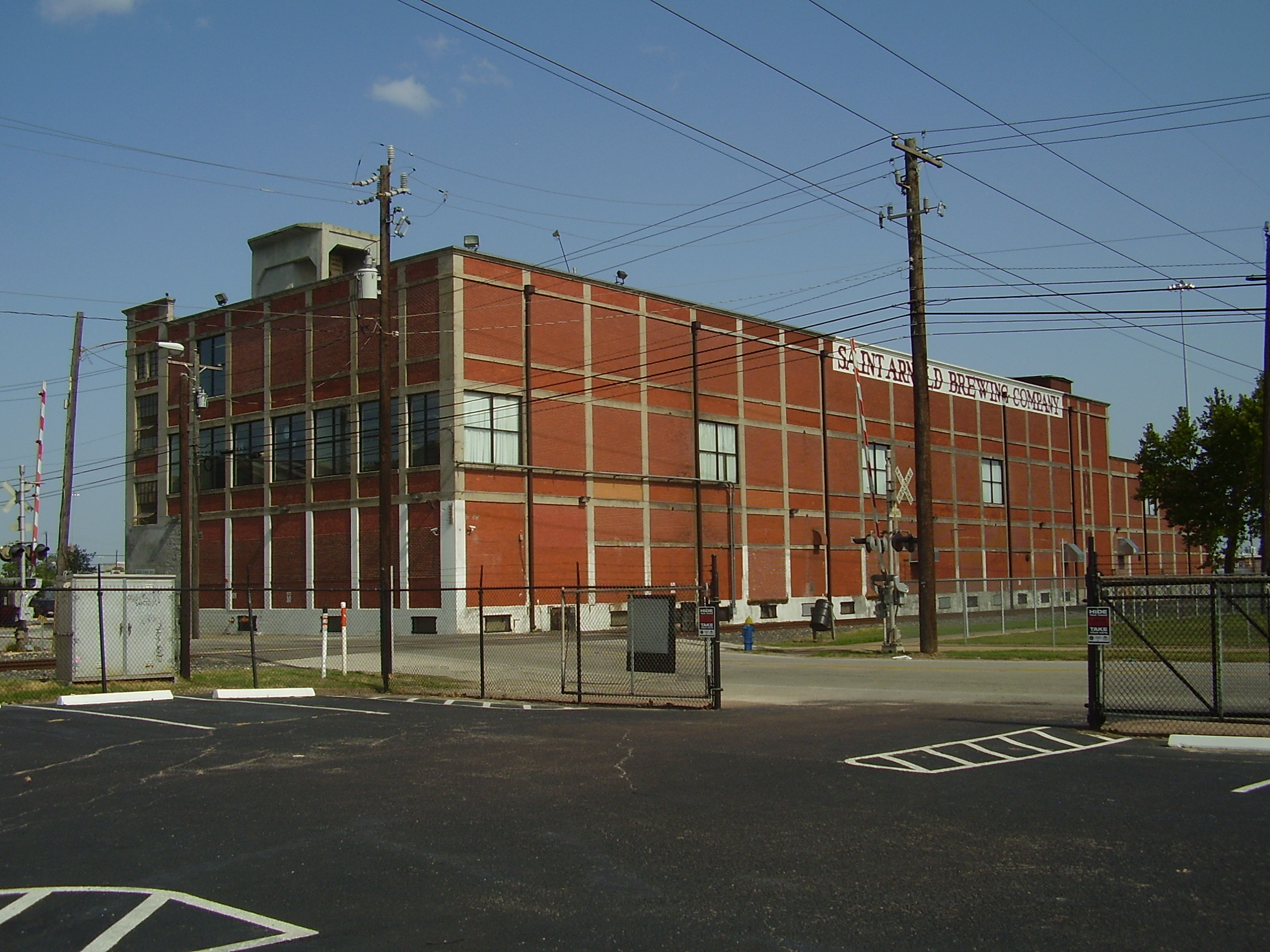
The Saint Arnold Brewing Company plant, the former Houston Independent School District Food Service Department Building

In 2009, Saint Arnold's Brewing relocated to the Northside area at 2000 Lyons, purchasing a building that was formerly a food service facility for the Houston Independent School District. Shipley Do-Nuts has its headquarters in the Northside.

The "Fulton Corridor," a stretch of Fulton Street within the district, is a major commercial avenue. By 2010 many major chains such as AutoZone, Family Dollar, Payless ShoeSource, Rent A Center, and Walgreens relocated outlets to the strip.

FedEx used to operate a freight facility in the area. As of 2010 the former freight facility land will house a 144-unit apartment complex with a clubhouse and a pool.

== Transportation ==
Metropolitan Transit Authority of Harris County, Texas (METRO) operates bus services in the Northside. The METRO Northline Transit Center/HCC opened at the northwest corner of Northline Mall on Saturday October 27, 2001. The center, covered and lighted, is the 15th transit center established by METRO. The center, with a price tag of $1 million, has four bus bays, an information kiosk, newspaper vending machines, benches, a covered platform, and bicycle racks. When the center opened, four bus routes served it. It became the northern terminus of the METRORail light rail system's Red Line on December 21, 2013; the line runs on Fulton Street and also stops at seven additional stations.

Coach USA, in partnership with Greyhound Lines, operates the Crosstimbers station at 4001 North Freeway.

== Education ==
=== Public schools ===
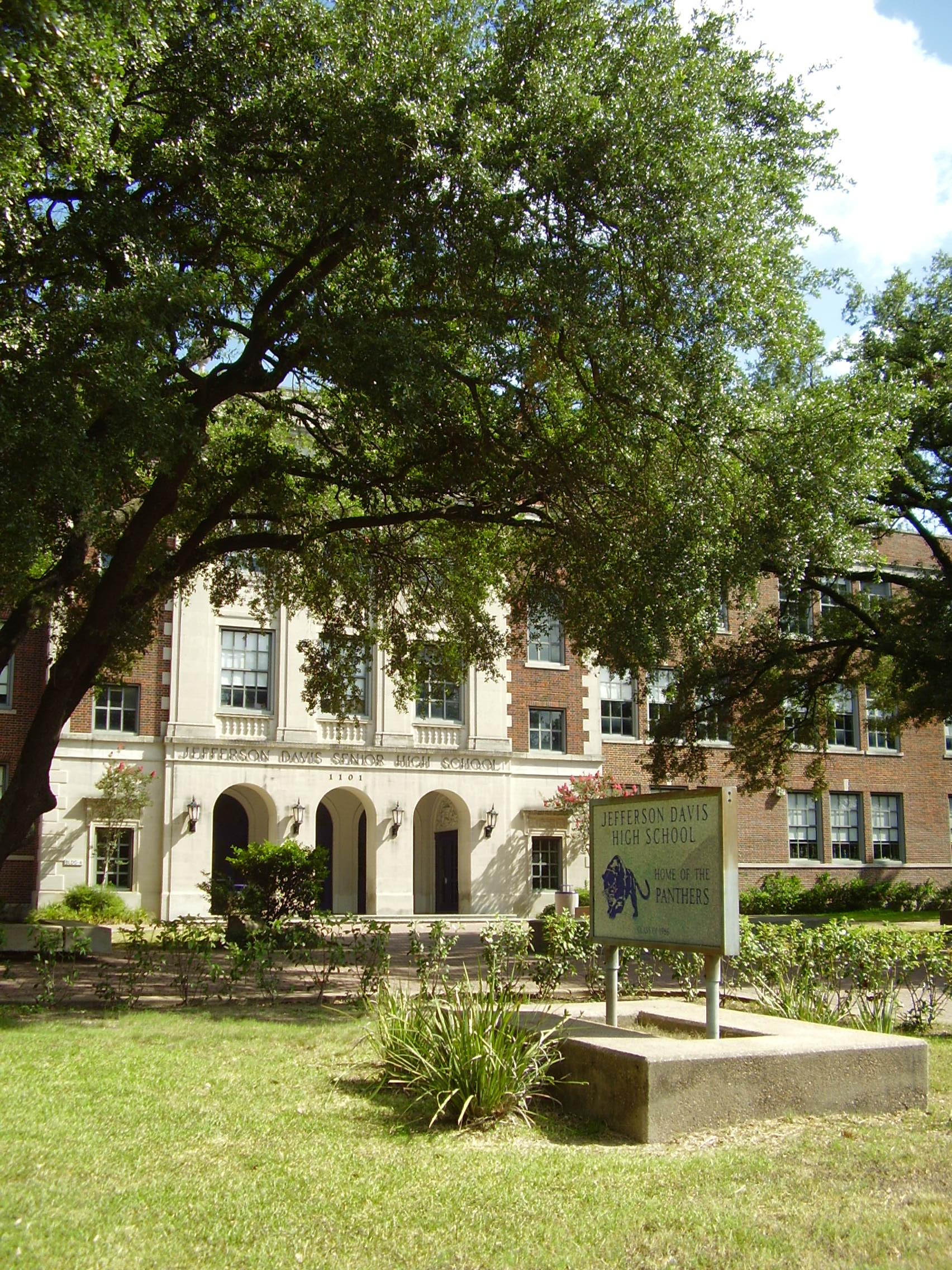
Davis High School

Most residents are within the Houston Independent School District. Two HISD zoned high schools, Northside (formerly Jefferson Davis) and Sam Houston, are in the Northside. Zoned high schools serving additional portions of the Northside include Heights (formerly John H. Reagan), Kashmere, and Washington. North Houston Early College High School is an optional school in the Northside. For a period Mickey Leland College Preparatory Academy for Young Men resided in the former Crawford Elementary School, in both the Fifth Ward and Northside.

Some sections are within the Aldine Independent School District. Residents of AISD in the Northside are zoned to MacArthur High School in unincorporated Harris County.

In 2011, YES Prep opened YES Prep Northside, a state charter school currently serving 6-12th grade. In addition George I. Sanchez Charter School North is also in Northside. Juan B. Galaviz Charter School and Benji's Academy were previously in Northside.

=== Public libraries ===
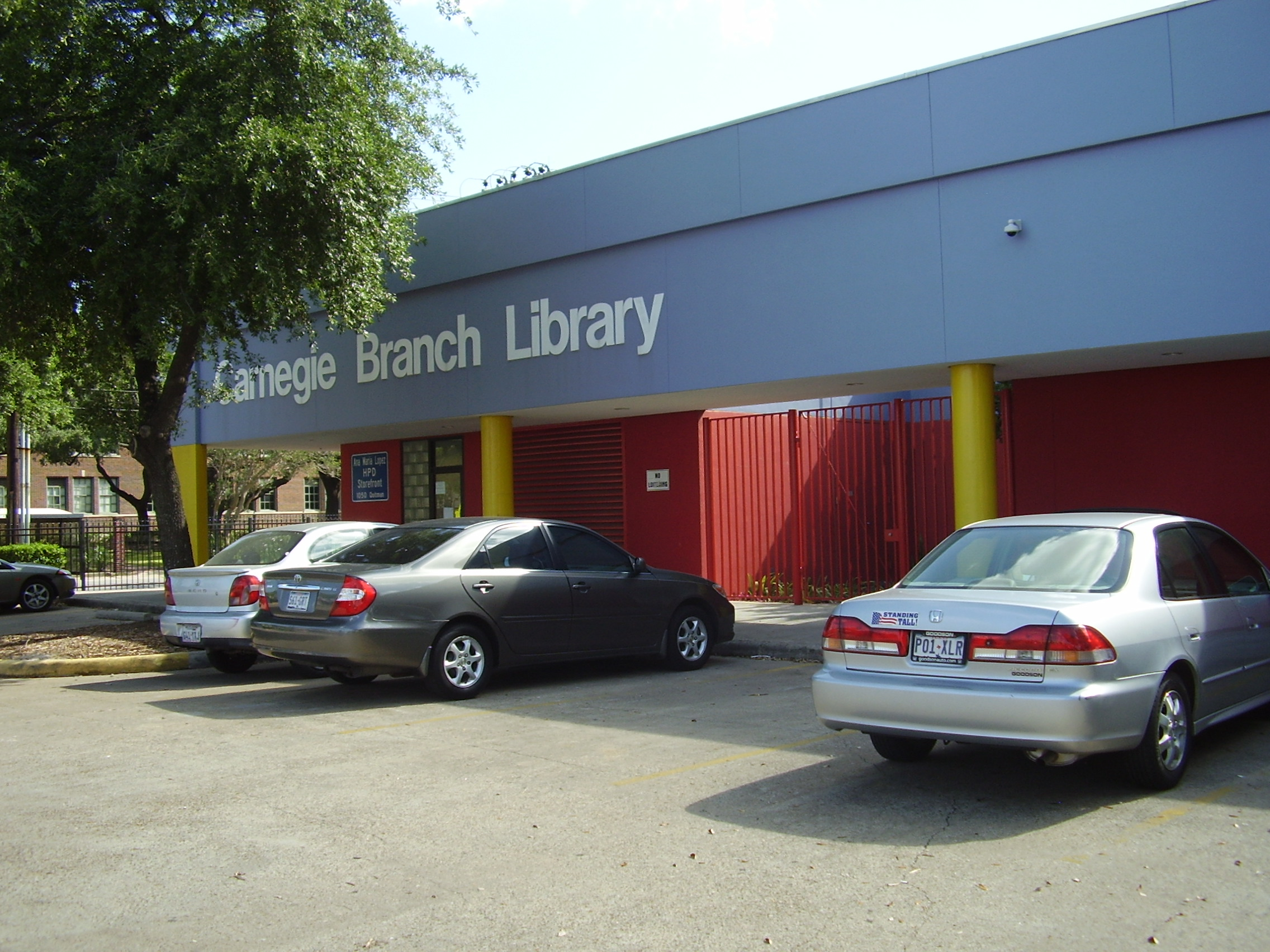
Carnegie Neighborhood Library

Houston Public Library operates public libraries in the Northside. The Carnegie Neighborhood Library and the Moody Neighborhood Library are within the district boundaries. The Dixon Neighborhood Library is adjacent to the district.

=== Colleges and universities ===
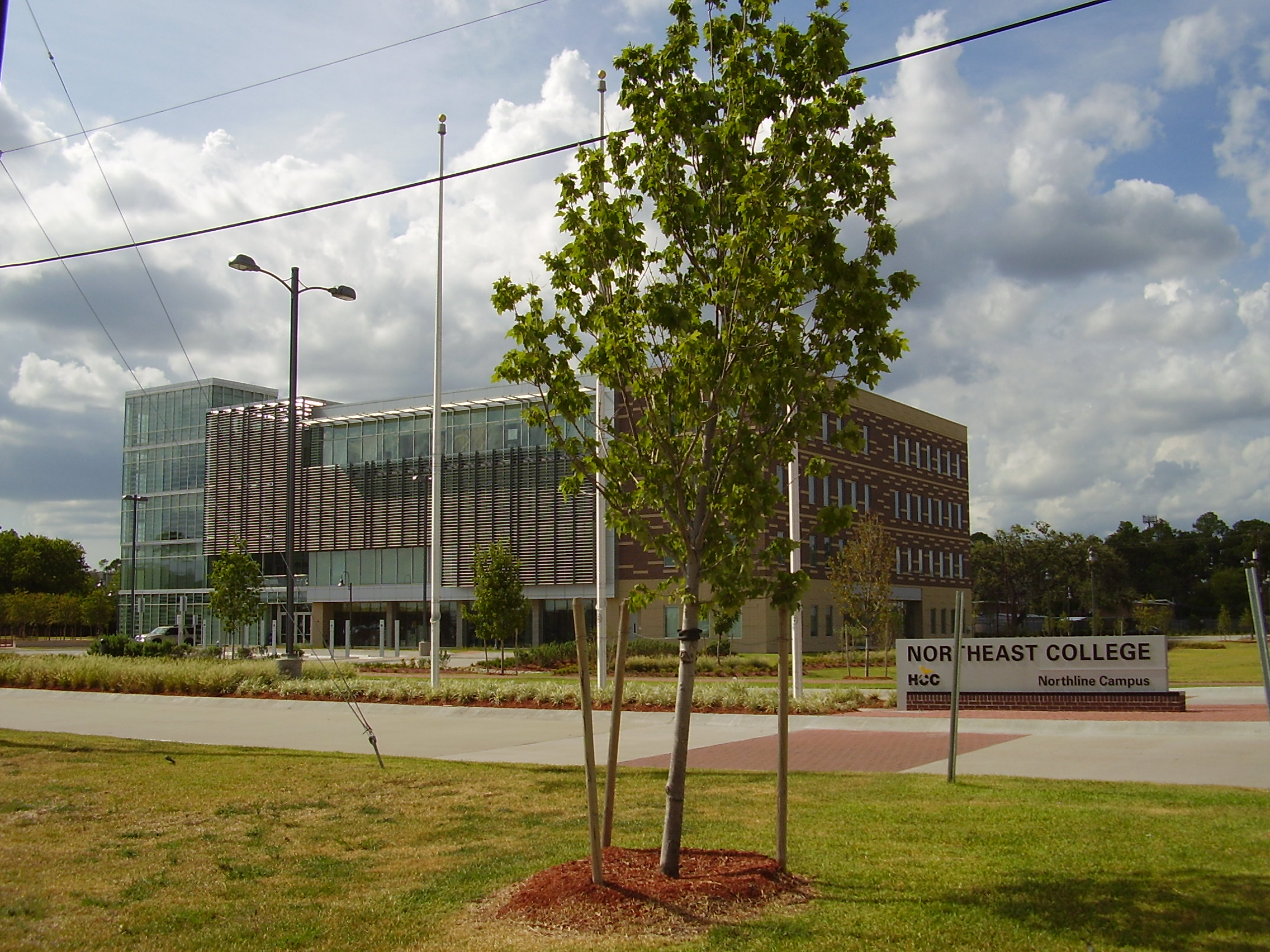
Northline Campus

Houston Community College operates the Northline Campus of the Northeast College.

The University of Houston–Downtown (UHD) is located within proximity of the community.
