= Rahr =

Rahr may refer to:

== People ==
- Charles Rahr (1865–1925), American businessman and politician
- Reinhardt Rahr (1859–1921), American businessman and brewer
- Stewart Rahr, American entrepreneur, investor and philanthropist
- Sue Rahr, American law enforcement officer

== Places ==
- Rahr West Art Museum, United States
- Rarh region, India

== Other ==
- Rahr and Sons Brewing Company
