= HTPA =

HTPA may refer to:

- Harbor Teacher Preparation Academy, a high school located in Wilmington, California
- Hypothalamic–pituitary–adrenal axis, the relationship the brain and stress hormones as they interact in a feedback loop
