= HCDE =

HCDE can refer to:

- Harris County Department of Education - Houston, Texas
- Hamilton County Department of Education or Hamilton County Schools - Chattanooga, Tennessee
