= Southern Star Brewing Company =

Coordinates: 30.3464°N 95.4327°W

- Industry: Alcoholic beverage
- Founded: 2007
- Headquarters: Conroe, Texas
- Products: Beer

A can of Southern Star Pine Belt Pale Ale

Southern Star Brewing Company is a brewery in Conroe, Texas, USA. Southern Star's president is Dave Fougeron, former head brewer of Houston-based Saint Arnold Brewing Company. The brewery distributes in Texas, Alabama, Indiana, Kentucky, Ohio and South Carolina.

Southern Star's flagship beer is its Bombshell Blonde, an American blonde ale at 5.25 percent alcohol by volume. It also produces Buried Hatchet, a Strong American Stout, at 8.25 percent alcohol by volume; and former Pine Belt Pale Ale, an American-style pale ale that is roughly 6.5 percent alcohol by volume.

In 2009, Southern Star introduced an annual competition for homebrewers. The winner's beer is put into production by Southern Star for a year. The first year's winning style was a saison; the winning style for 2010 was a smoked porter.

In 2019, Southern Star was named as one of the top 100 best breweries in Texas in the Texas Craft Beer Report published by the analytics organization Hopalytics.
