= Greenville Technical Charter High School =

Location
- 506 S Pleasantburg Dr, Building 119; Greenville, South Carolina 29607; United States; 34.826162°N 82.375277°W

Information
- Type: Charter
- Established: 1998 (28 years ago)
- School district: SC Public Charter School District
- Authority: GTCHS
- Principal: Rhonda Gregory
- Teaching staff: 31.66 (FTE)
- Grades: 9–12
- Enrollment: 526 (2023-2024)
- Student to teacher ratio: 16.61
- Colors: Blue, white
- Nickname: Warriors
- Website: www.gtchs.org

Greenville Technical Charter High School (GTCHS) is a small school located on the Barton Campus of Greenville Technical College in Greenville, South Carolina, United States. It is a middle college high school. It was established as the first charter school in South Carolina and in partnership with Greenville Technical College. It was the first charter school to be awarded the National Blue Ribbon of Excellence (2010) and the Palmetto's Finest Award (2008).

== College classes ==
As part of the middle college program, students are encouraged to take college classes through Greenville Technical College for minimal fees; while the majority begin sophomore year, the Early College Cohort can begin as freshmen. Approximately 60% of students graduate from GTCHS with 24 or more college credits and GTCHS graduates high school students with Associate Degrees every year.

== Aviation and Science ==
GTCHS was the first school in the state to pilot the AOPA Curriculum. This career pathway leads to three possible outcomes: Pilot, Engineer, and Aircraft Maintenance Technician. Whether students want to be certified in crewed flight or remote piloting, become an engineer or technician, or learn more about science through the lens of aviation, this program promotes the skills they need for postsecondary careers in STEM. In addition to the course offerings through Greenville Technical College, there are also science course offerings such as Meteorology, Astronomy, and Marine Biology at GTCHS.

== Arts ==
The Fine Arts Program at GTCHS contains courses in drama, the visual arts, chorus, band, and orchestra. In addition, students can take Musical Theater and be part of the International Thespian Society. Warrior Arts has two productions annually: a fall play and a spring musical. The program hosts events such as Improv Night, winter and spring concerts, art shows, and the Murder Mystery Dinner Theater.

== Athletics ==
The GTCHS Warriors are in Region I-AA in the state of South Carolina. There are seven sports with fifteen teams representing the school.

| Men's Sports | Women's Sports |
|---|---|
| Baseball | Softball |
| Basketball* | Basketball* |
| Cross Country | Cross Country |
| Soccer* | Soccer* |
| Track & Field | Track & Field |
| Swimming | Swimming |
| | Volleyball* |
*These sports have a junior varsity (JV) team
