= Magic Johnson Theatres =

American chain of movie theaters

Magic Johnson Theatres is a chain of movie theaters, originally developed in 1994 by Johnson Development Corporation, the business holding of ex-basketball player Magic Johnson, and Sony Pictures Entertainment through a collaboration with Sony-Loews Theatres.

A 1998 merger between Sony-Loews and Cineplex Odeon Corporation caused them to become part of the new Loews Cineplex Entertainment Corp. Magic Johnson collaborated with Lawrence Ruisi, the president and CEO of Loews Cineplex Entertainment, during the planning and development of these theaters. Currently, the chain's former locations are owned by AMC Theatres, after Sony-Loews was acquired by that company in 2006. Although they are still branded Magic Johnson Theatres, they are solely controlled by AMC.

While the chain still bears Johnson's name, he is no longer actively involved in the management committee, strategic planning, operations, or public relations.

== History ==
The focus of Magic Theatres was to build first-rate multiplexes in urban communities, bringing high-quality facilities and technology, as well as job development, encouraging local economic growth. While Magic Theatres are patterned after the Loews Cineplex Entertainment model, they focus on urban markets. Each complex is around 60,000 square feet (5,600 m^{2}) with multiple concession areas, 10 to 15 screens with Sony Dynamic Digital Sound (SDDS) immersive sound, stadium seating and a capacity of 3,200 to 5,000. After building the Magic Theatre in Harlem, multiple businesses followed suit, including Old Navy, Walt Disney, and HMV.

There are/were two multiplex theatres in, or near, major cities of the United States of America, namely in areas which are predominantly African-American and previously were underserved by modern cineplexes.

Johnson brought his understanding of the community to his theater operations. In his concessions, he planned on his customers eating their dinner with the movie, adding chicken wings and buffalo shrimp to the selection. Flavored sodas were added to emulate the Kool-Aid the kids he grew up with would drink at home.

"Used to be we couldn't afford to go to dinner and the movie afterward. I told Loews 'Black people are going to eat dinner at the movies'"

No gang colors or "hanging out" in large groups was permitted in the theaters. Johnson would personally appear before each movie:

"So we got a few policies that apply to everyone. They are not meant to disrespect. They're there so we can all have a good time. So if you have a problem, leave it in the street."

=== Los Angeles multiplex ===
The venture dates back to July 1995, when the Magic Johnson Crenshaw 15 opened in the Baldwin Hills Crenshaw Plaza in the South region of Los Angeles, California.

It was the first multiplex theatre opened, and was closed in 2010. It was completely renovated and reopened as the Rave Cinemas Baldwin Hills 15 by the Rave Cinemas chain in June 2011. It is now owned by Cinemark Theatres and is renamed the Baldwin Hills Crenshaw Plaza 15 and XD.

=== Other multiplexes ===
The only two multiplexes that were opened during the collaboration with Magic Johnson, and are still operating, is the AMC Magic Johnson Harlem 9 in Harlem, New York City and the AMC Magic Johnson 12 Capital Center in Largo, MD, a suburb of Washington, D.C.

The Randall Park 12 in Cleveland, Ohio; Northline 12 in Houston, Texas; and Greenbriar 12 in Atlanta, Georgia — were all closed by AMC due to lack of profitability.

The Magic Theatres Cap Center 12 in Largo, Maryland, is still open and operated by AMC Theatres. The Cap Center 12 was the first multiplex opened that was not a collaboration with Magic Johnson. Loews Cineplex Entertainment had used the Magic Theatres name only to brand the location.

== See also ==
- AMC Theatres venues
