= Houston Community College System Foundation =

Coordinates: 29.7420°N 95.3768°W

The Houston Community College System Foundation was founded in 1976 to provide scholarships to Houston Community College students and to support the college's efforts to attract and educate Houston-area students—including many non-traditional students and those facing barriers to higher education.

Like virtually all community college foundations, for most of its existence the HCCS Foundation functioned primarily as a clearinghouse for scholarships, accepting funds from donors and awarding them to eligible students. It was not expected to engage in large-scale solicitation of funds.

Much has changed since the HCCS Foundation's establishment. Higher education has become a requirement for earning a stable living, and businesses have begun clamoring for a more educated workforce. At the same time, tuition and fees at four-year institutions have skyrocketed, and Houston's demographics have shifted, with the majority of the city's young people now coming from backgrounds historically unlikely to receive higher education.

In 2007, the HCCS Foundation launched a website, and was reclassified by the Internal Revenue Service as a Section 509(a)(1) and 170(b)(1)(A)(vi) publicly supported charity.
