= Houston City College =

Community college system in Texas, U.S.

Coordinates: 29.7375°N 95.3764°W

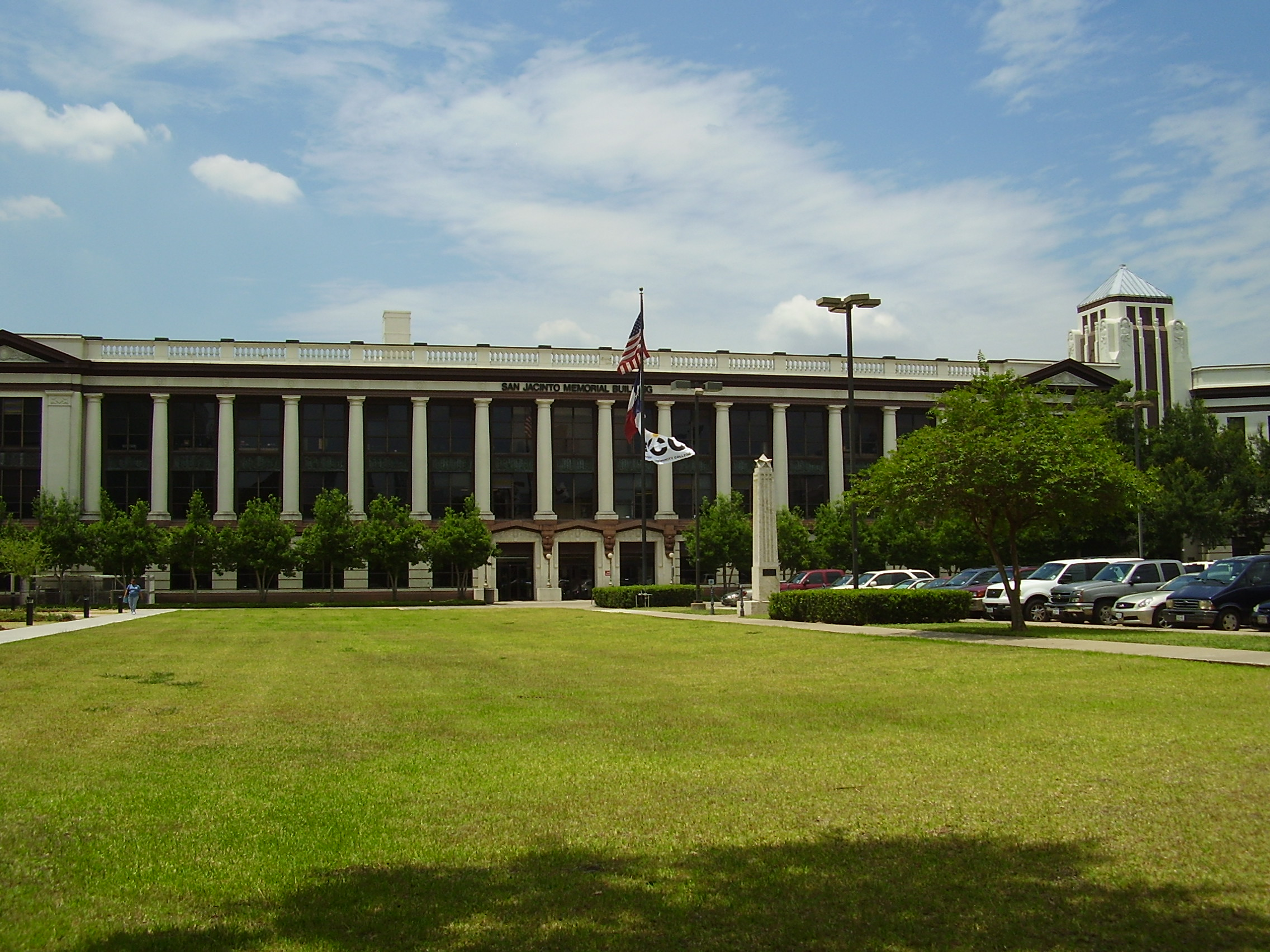
- San Jacinto Memorial Building, formerly San Jacinto High School
- Former name: Houston Community College (1971–2025)
- Type: Public community college system
- Established: 1971
- Accreditation: SACS
- Chancellor: Margaret Ford Fisher
- Faculty: 2,535
- Administrative staff: 1,465
- Students: 52,000+ (Fall 2024)
- Location: Houston, Texas, United States
- Campus: 23 commuter campuses
- Nickname: HCCS (or HCC)
- Mascot: Eagle
- Website: www.hccs.edu
- (Logo used prior 2026, before name change).

Houston City College (HCC), also known as the Houston City College System (HCCS), is a public community college system that operates community colleges in Houston, Missouri City, Greater Katy, and Stafford in the U.S. state of Texas. Founded in 1971 as Houston Community College, it is notable for actively recruiting internationally and for the large number of international students enrolled, over 5,700 in 2015. Its open enrollment policies, which do not require proficiency in English, are backed by a full-time 18-month English proficiency program and remedial courses. In 2025, its board voted to rename the college to Houston City College.

As defined by the Texas Legislature, the official service area of HCCS includes the following school districts:

- Houston Independent School District
- Stafford Municipal School District
- Spring Branch Independent School District (included in service area by state law, but is not part of the tax base),
- Alief Independent School District
- Katy Independent School District
- North Forest Independent School District (now consolidated into Houston ISD)
- the portions of the Fort Bend Independent School District located within the cities of Houston, Missouri City, and Pearland. Additionally, it includes areas not in Wharton County Junior College (in other words, not in Sugar Land nor in the extraterritorial jurisdiction of Sugar Land.)

== History ==
In 1927, the Houston Independent School District founded its first community colleges, Houston Junior College (for whites), which later evolved into the University of Houston and the Houston Colored Junior College, later changed to Houston College for Negroes (now Texas Southern University). In 1971, the district founded HCCS after HJC's and HCN's evolutions into the University of Houston and Texas Southern University respectively. In its early days, HCCS once used HISD school campuses for teaching facilities with classes during evenings and weekends like its founders. Around 1997, HCCS began to transfer operations to community college district-operated campuses throughout the HCCS service area.

=== Former campus in Qatar ===
Qatar operates Education City to bring U.S. universities to the Middle East. Houston Community College ran a satellite campus in Education City. However, in early 2016 HCC announced that they were "massively scaling back operations" and closed this campus. Over a five-year period, Qatar's government paid HCC approximately $30.5 million to subsidize the Education City campus. In a news interview, the HCC Board of Trustees Treasurer said he did not support continuing the campus. "We're a community college to educate kids in our district," he said. When HCC first sent teachers to its Qatar campus, the Qatari government made some of them return to the United States because they were Jewish.

== Libraries ==
HCC Libraries operates 17 library service locations: 1 Library Support Services office, 2 Electronic Resource Centers (ERCs), 4 Digital Access Centers (DACs), 9 Libraries, and 1 Learning Commons as of 2025.

=== Central College ===
- Central Campus Library
- South Digital Access Center

=== Coleman College ===
- Coleman Electronic Resource Center

=== Southeast College ===
- Eastside Campus Library
- Felix Fraga Digital Access Center

=== Northeast College ===
- Acres Homes Electronic Resource Center (ERC)
- Codwell Library at Northeast Campus next to DAC.
  - Originally located in Codwell Hall, the first building on campus, the library was later relocated to the third floor of the Learning Hub (Building 09) at Northeast Campus.
- North Forest Digital Access Center (DAC)
  - North Forest DAC is located in Building B, also known as the Workforce Building.
- Northline Campus Library
  - Northline Campus Library is located in Building A, also known as the Main Building. Northline's Digital Access Center, built in 2024, is operated separately from the library by Tutoring Services in Building E on campus.

=== Southwest College ===
- Missouri City Electronic Resource Center
- Stafford Campus Library
- West Loop Campus Library

=== Northwest College ===
- Alief-Hayes Campus Library
- Katy Campus Library at the Learning Commons
- Spring Branch Campus Library
- West Houston Institute Learning Commons

=== District Administration ===
- Library Support Services at District Office

==== Library History ====
HCC Library Council, consisting of five college library directors and one library support services director, successfully advocated for the creation of the Executive Director of Libraries position to oversee its system in 2015.

Prior to 2019, the Electronic Resource Center (ERC) at Alief-Bissonnet Campus closed.

In August 2019, HCC's Pinemont Campus and its Electronic Resource Center (ERC) closed.

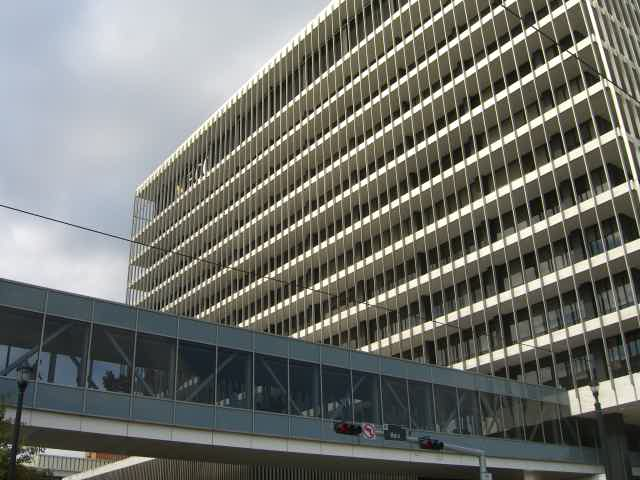
Houston City College System Administration Building

== Police ==
HCC operates its own police department.

As peace officers, state law grants HCC Police the power to arrest without warrant for any felony, breach of the peace, disorderly conduct or intoxication offense that is committed in their presence or view while in Texas. They may make an arrest pursuant to a warrant anywhere in Texas. The HCC Police Department is divided into six divisions: Administrative, Criminal Investigations, Patrol, Bike Patrol, Training, Communications.

== HCC Television ==
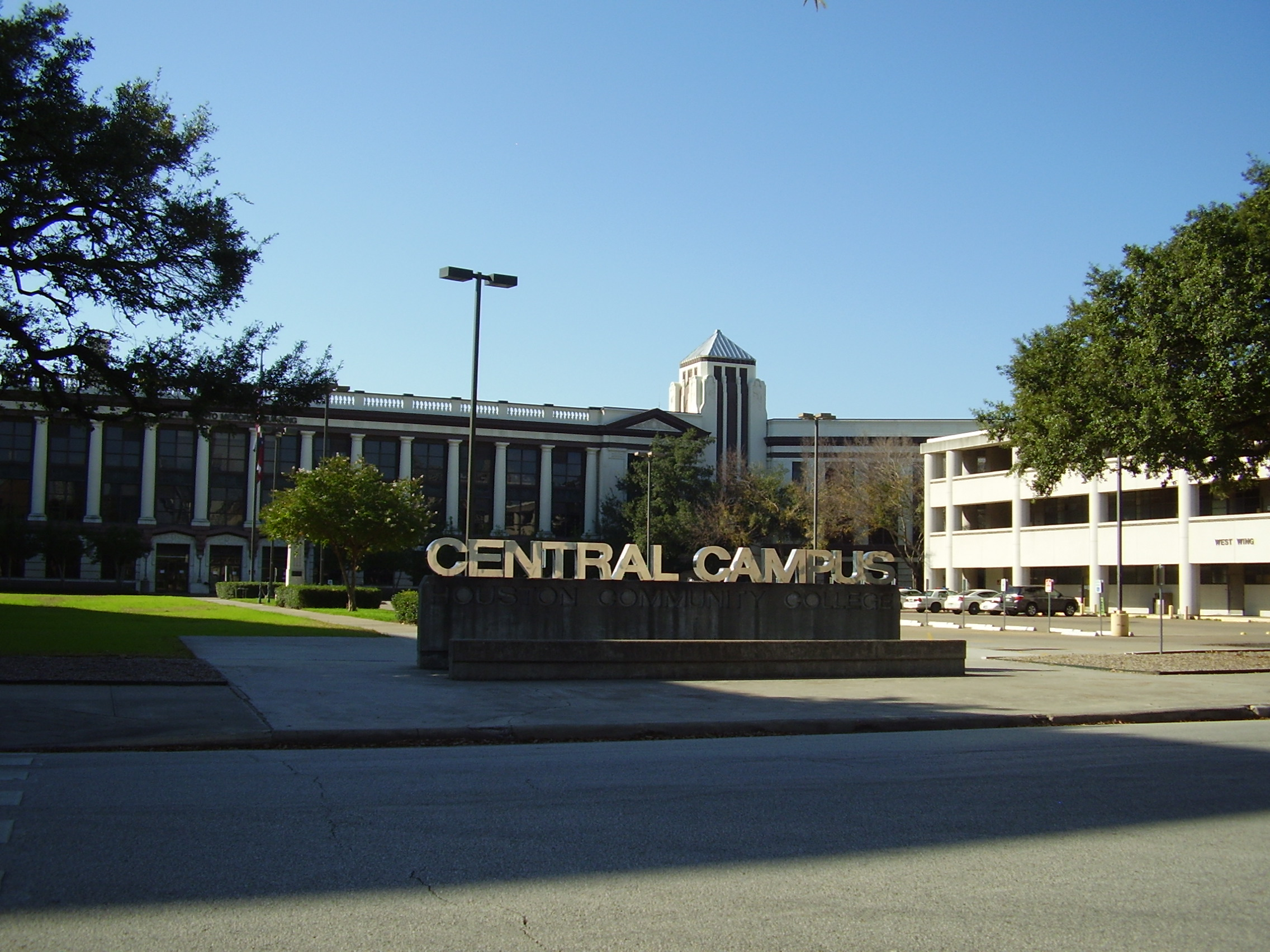
HCCS Central Campus (Midtown)

HCCTV began in 1994 when the City of Houston chose the Houston Community College System (HCCS) to operate one of its educational access channels. Already in place since 1980, HCCTV was the college system's video component, producing programs of education, training and college promotion.

HCCS operates Houston Community College Television (HCCTV) on Xfinity Channel 19, TV Max Channel 97, Phonoscope Channel 77 and Cebridge Channel 20 and streamed over the internet. The studio complex, which has one large studio unit, five editing suites, and a digital master control system, is located at the HCC District Campus.

== Athletics ==
HCC offers several sports activities to its students throughout its campuses; the sports offered include:

- Basketball (Men & Women)
- Flag Football (Men)
- Golf (Men & Women)
- Fitness (Men & Women)
- Soccer (Men & Women)
- Tennis (Men & Women)
- Volleyball (Women)

== List of colleges in HCCS ==
=== Central College ===
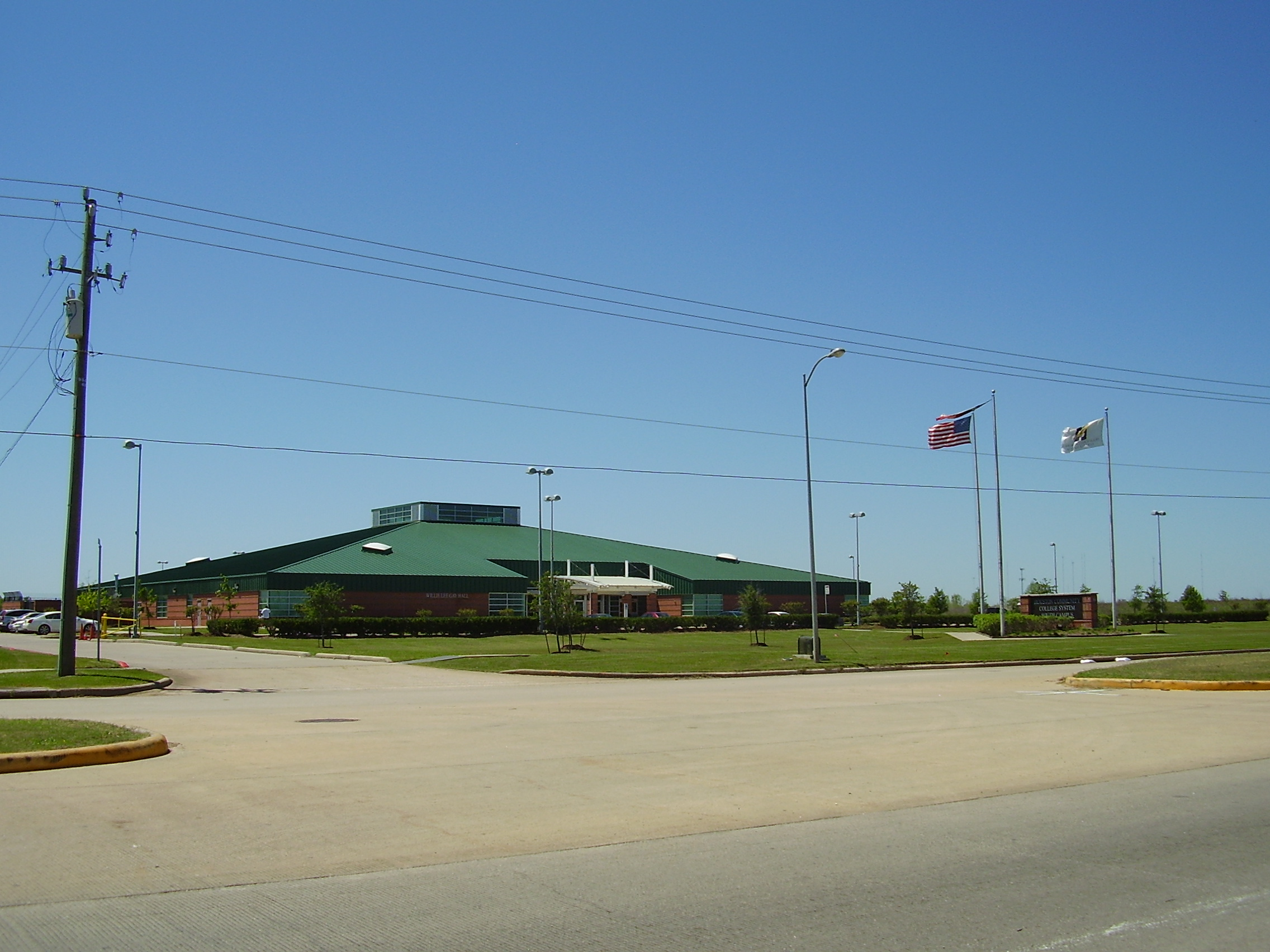
Willie Lee Gay Hall (South Campus)

Central College is home to the Central and South campuses, which serve different portions of the HCC Central service area.

- Central Campus (Houston)
  - HCC's Central Campus, in Midtown Houston, is served by a METRORail station, Ensemble/HCC Station. Houston Academy for International Studies of Houston ISD opened on HCC's Central Campus in Fall 2006.
- South Campus (Houston)
  - HCC's South Campus is in the Central Southwest area of Houston, and is served by the HCC South Campus bus station.
  - HCC's South Campus comprises the Willie Lee Gay Hall and Workforce Center buildings.

=== Coleman College for Health Sciences ===
- Coleman College of Health Sciences (Houston)
  - Coleman College is located in the Texas Medical Center district.
  - Coleman College offers several associate degree and certificate programs as HCC's main college for health sciences.

=== Northeast College ===
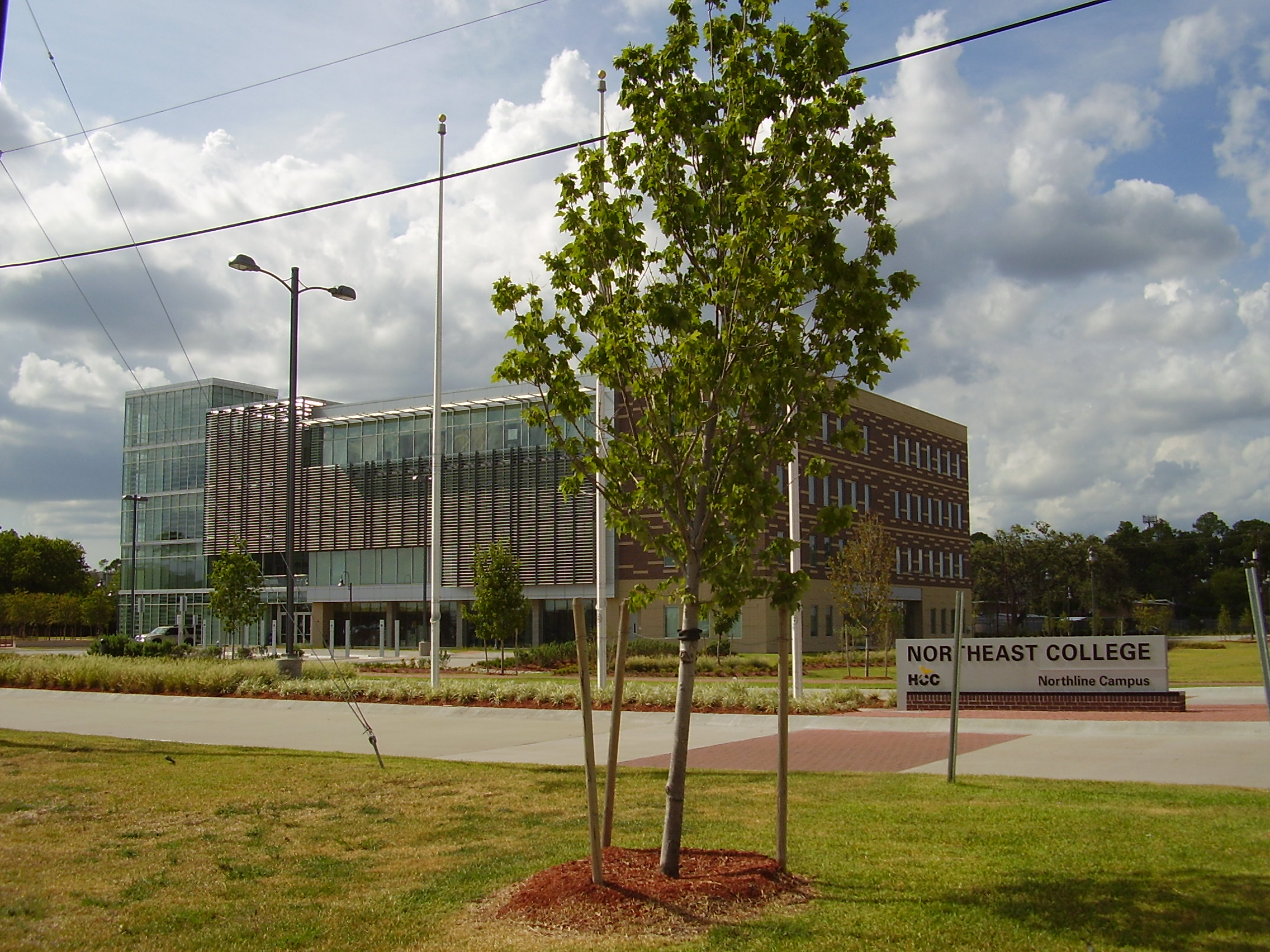
Northline Campus (Northside)

Northeast College is home to the Acres Homes, North Forest, Northeast, and Northline campuses and the Automative Technology Training Center, which serve different parts of the HCC Northeast College service area.

- Acres Homes Campus (Houston)
  - The Acres Homes Campus is located in north Houston, just to the east of Houston's Acres Home neighborhood.
- North Forest Campus (Houston)
  - The North Forest Campus is located in northeast Houston's East Little York/Homestead neighborhood.
- Northeast Campus (Houston)
  - The Northeast Campus is located in northeast Harris County's North Shore community.
  - This campus houses the Global Energy and Public Safety Centers of Excellence.
- Northline Campus (Houston)
  - This campus is the site of HISD's North Houston Early College High School.
  - Northline Campus is located in the Northside/Northline super neighborhood of Houston. The campus and nearby Northline Commons shopping plaza both occupy the former site of Northline Mall. The campus is serviced by the Northline Transit Center/HCC.
- Automotive Technology Training Center (Houston)
  - The Automative Technology Training Center is located near HCC's Northline Campus.
  - This campus contains tailored programs in the high-tech Automative, auto body/collision repair, and diesel equipment industries.

=== Northwest College ===
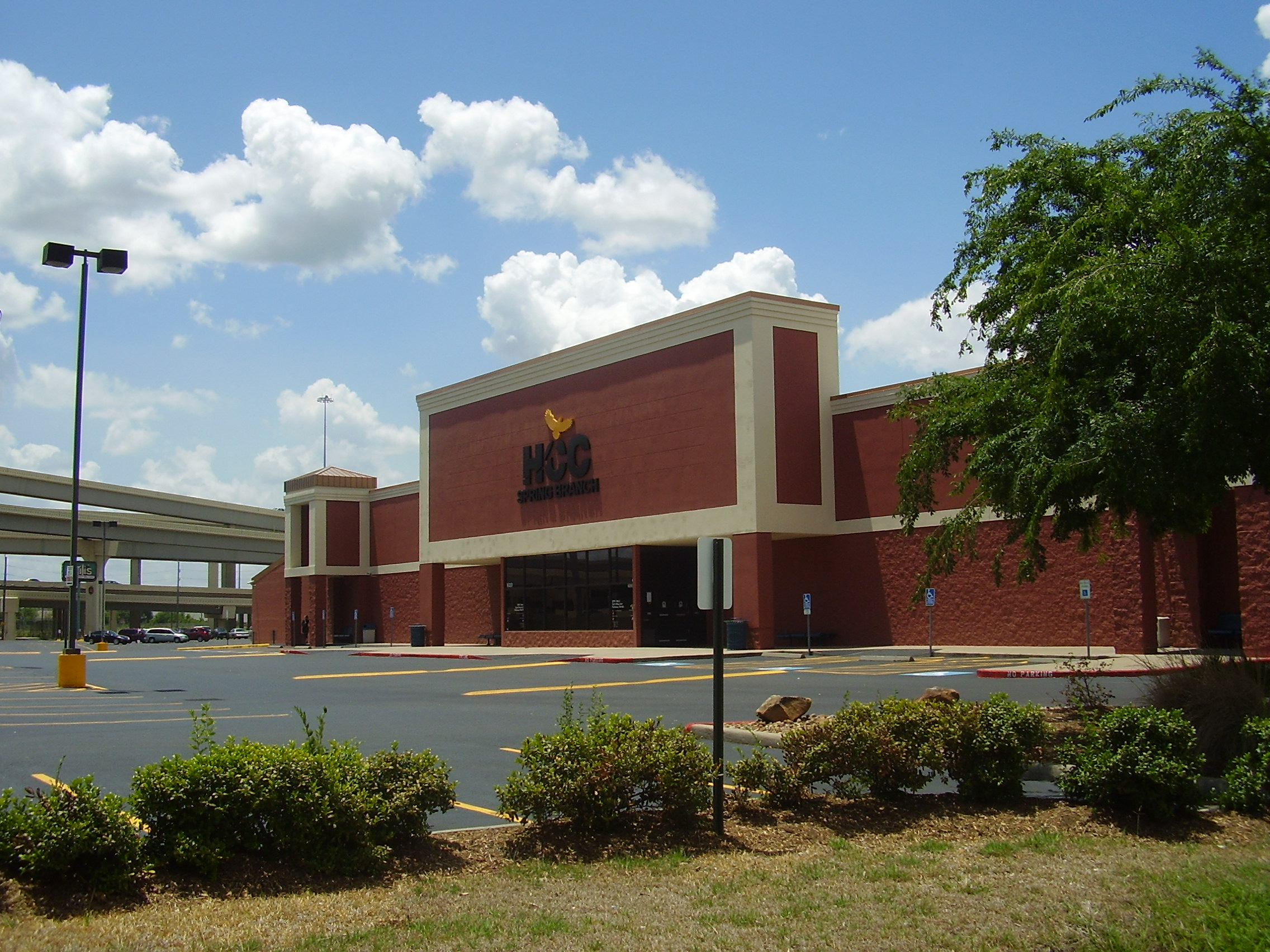
Houston City College Spring Branch (Memorial City, near Spring Branch)

Northwest College is home to the Alief Bissonnet, Alief Hayes, Katy, and Spring Branch campuses, serving different parts of the HCC Northwest service area.

- Alief Bissonnet Campus (Houston)
  - The Alief Bissonnet Campus is located in West Houston's International District (Alief neighborhood).
  - The Alief Bissonnet Campus offers workforce certificate courses, an Adult High School and HCC's Career4U Academy.
- Alief Hayes Campus (Houston)
  - The Alief Hayes Campus is the site of Alief ISD's Alief Early College High School.
  - The Alief Hayes Campus is home to HCC's Engineering Center of Excellence and has a partnership with the University of Texas at Tyler to provision an engineering bachelor's degree.
  - This campus also contains HCC's Center for Entrepreneurship and the West Houston Institute.
- Katy Campus (Katy)
  - The former Katy campus, originally known as Westgate at 1550 Foxlake Drive, closed in May 2022 with the college's relocation to a new Greater Katy campus location on 22910 Colonial Parkway.
  - In partnership with Texas A&M Victoria, students can earn an associate degree at HCC and transfer to Texas A&M Victoria to earn a bachelor's degree in a high demand field at the Katy campus.
  - Its UH/HCC Engineering Academy also allows students to co-enroll at the University of Houston and HCC.
  - This campus contains the Warren Bernard Itz Horticulture, Agriculture, and Environmental Studies program.
- Spring Branch Campus (Houston)
  - The Spring Branch Campus is located at the intersection of Beltway 8 and I-10 in West Houston, across City Centre.
  - This campus is home to HCC's Media, Visual & Performing Arts Center of Excellence, and contains the Spring Branch Visual Arts Gallery and a Performing Arts Center.
  - The campus houses the Texas A&M Engineering Academy at HCC, as well as the West side Emergency Medical Services, and Interior Design programs.

=== Southeast College ===
Fraga Campus (Near Downtown)

Southeast College is home to two separate campuses in different parts of the HCC Southeast service area.

- Felix Fraga Academic Campus (Houston)
  - The Felix Fraga Academic Campus is located in the Second Ward, 1.25 miles east of Downtown Houston at 301 N. Drennan St.
  - The Felix Fraga Academic Campus comprises the Felix Fraga Building and the STEM Building.
  - The campus opened January 2010 and was named for Felix Fraga by the HCC Board of Trustees in honor of his dedication to the educational, social, and economic success of the young people of Houston's southeast community and his devotion to improving their neighborhood. Fraga served as an HISD trustee, a member of the Houston City Council, and the Vice President of External Affairs for the Neighborhood Centers, Inc. before his death in 2024. Its flagship offerings include Maritime Logistics, Pre-Engineering, and other STEM (Science, Technology, Engineering, Math) classes.
  - In partnership with HISD, the Felix Fraga Campus is also the host location of HISD's East Early College High School.
- Eastside Campus (Houston)
  - The Eastside Campus is located in Pecan Park neighborhood in the Second Ward and offers programs meeting the needs of students of different backgrounds and interests.
  - This campus contains HCC's Small Business Development & Entrepreneurship Center, which provides education, training, and other resources for small businesses.
  - This campus contains the Upward Bound (UB) Program, which provides education support for low-income participants in preparation for college admissions.

=== Southwest College ===
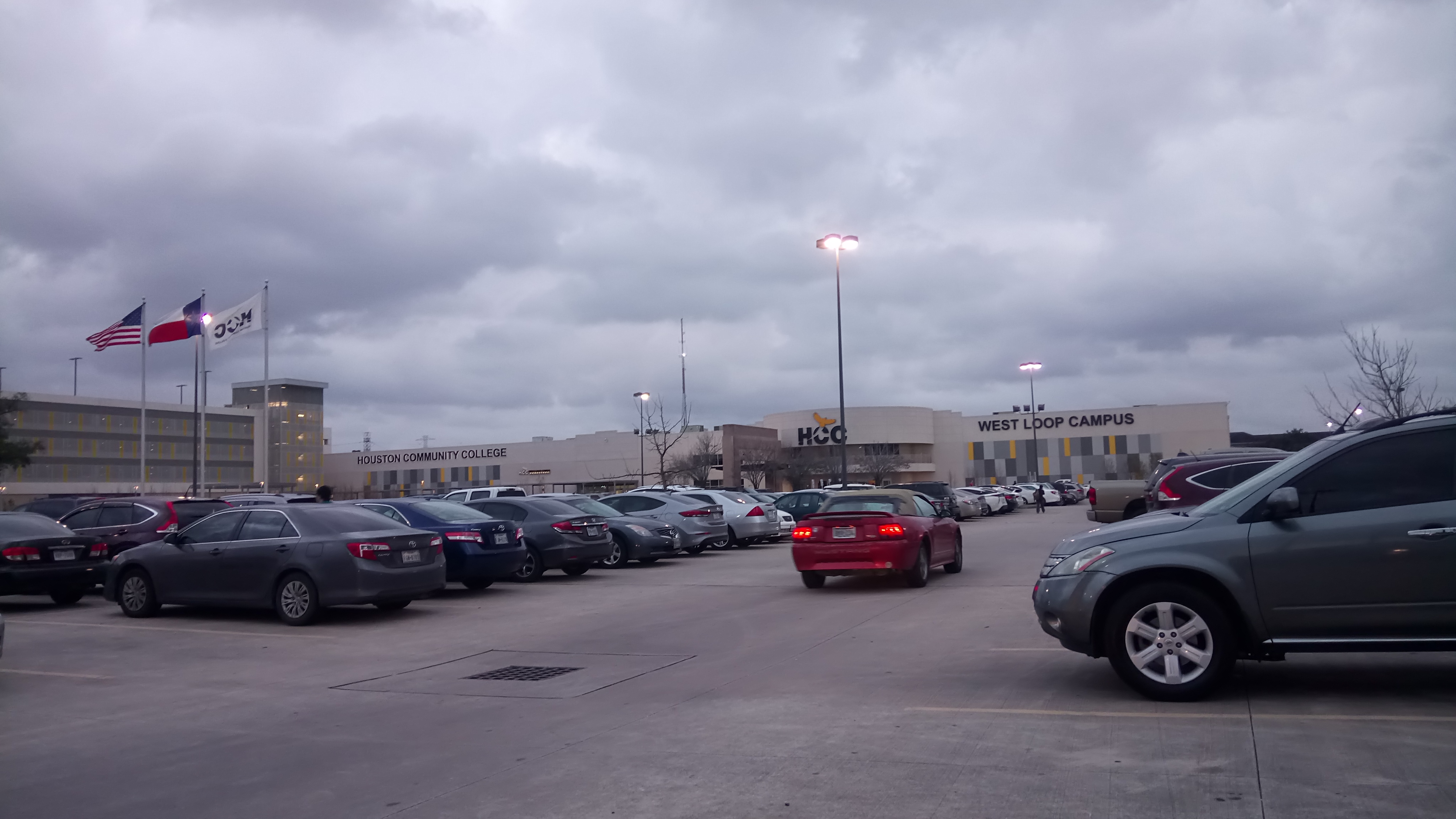
HCC West Loop Center

Southwest College is home to the Brays Oaks, Missouri City, Stafford, and West Loop campuses, which serve different portions of the HCC Southwest service area.

- Brays Oaks Campus (Houston)
  - The Brays Oaks Campus is located in Southwest Houston's Brays Oaks neighborhood.
- Missouri City Campus (Missouri City)
  - The Missouri City Campus is located in the Houston suburb of Missouri City, Texas.
- Stafford Campus (Stafford)
  - The Stafford Campus is located in the Houston suburb of Stafford, Texas.
- West Loop Campus (Houston)
  - The West Loop Campus is located in Southwest Houton, next to the enclave of Bellaire, Texas.

== Notable alumni ==
- Olubukola Mary Akinpelu, nurse educator
- Chloe Dao, fashion designer and television personality
- Scott Duncan, multi-billionaire
- Hanumankind, musician
- Megan thee Stallion, rapper

== See also ==
- Houston Community College System Foundation
