= Randall Park Mall =

Defunct mall in Cuyahoga County, Ohio, U.S.

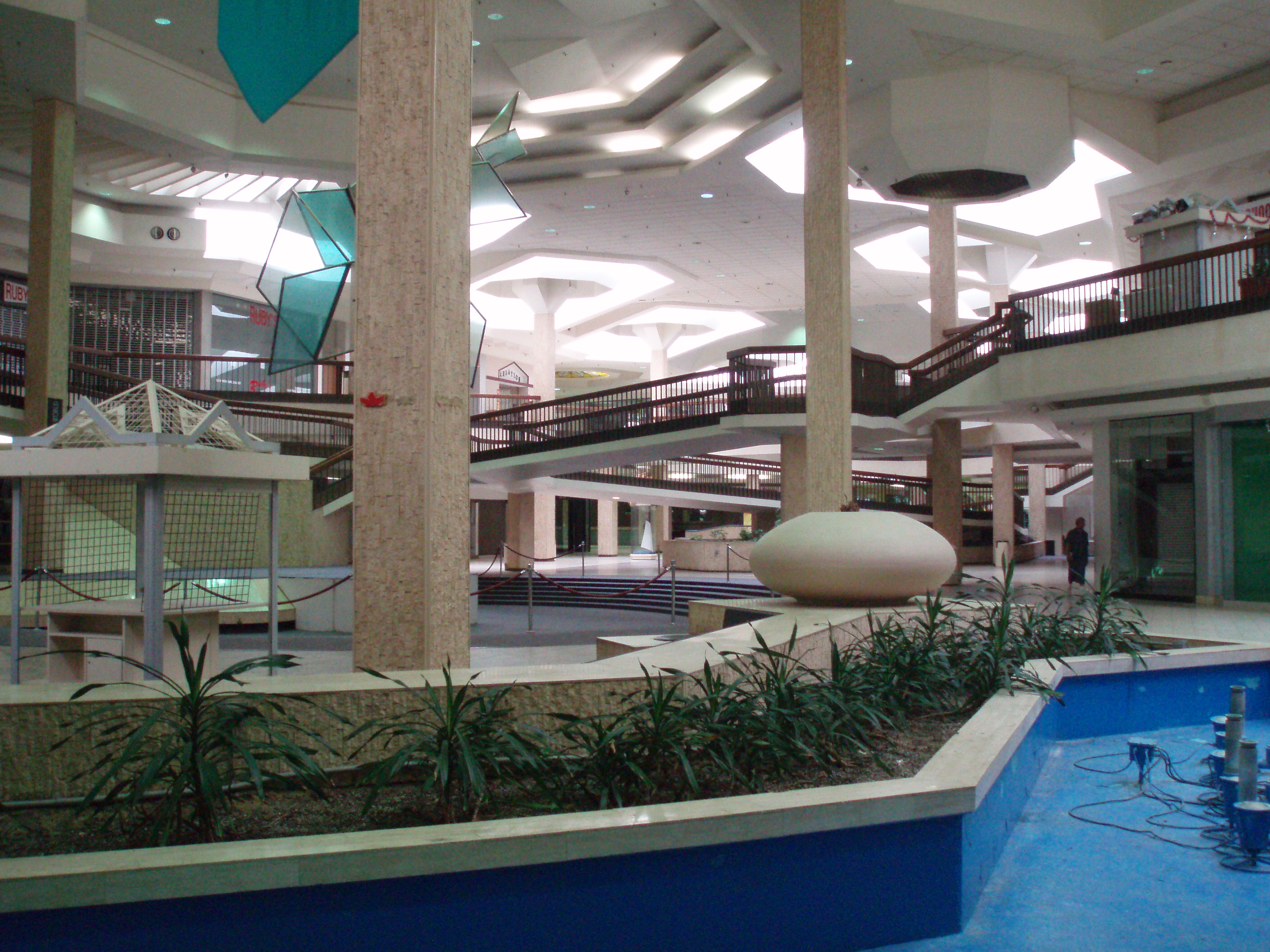
- Interior view (June 2008)
- Location: North Randall, Ohio, U.S.
- Coordinates: 41.431691°N 81.531086°W
- Address: 20801 Miles Road
- Opened: August 11, 1976; 50 years ago
- Closed: March 12, 2009; 17 years ago
- Demolished: August 2017
- Developer: Edward J. DeBartolo Corporation
- Owner: Amazon
- Architect: Frank DeBartolo
- Num. of stores: 200 (at peak)
- Num. of anchor tenants: 7 (at peak)
- Floor area: 2,200,000 square feet (200,000 m^{2})
- Floors: 2

Randall Park Mall was a super-regional shopping mall located in the village of North Randall, Ohio, United States. It opened on August 11, 1976 on the site of what used to be the Randall Park Race Track. After over a decade of decline, it closed on March 12, 2009. The former Dillard's store and interior of the mall were demolished in 2015 to make way for an industrial park, and the remaining anchor tenants were demolished in 2017 after they all closed. Amazon built a new distribution center on the site in 2018.

== History ==
In 1966, Dominic Visconsi proposed building Garfield Mall in nearby Garfield Heights. In 1968, voters gave their support to the project, and the next year a proposal was revealed. Garfield Mall was to have heated underground parking, as well as elevator and escalator access to stores such as JCPenney, Sears, and Higbee's. In 1971, Youngstown developer Edward J. DeBartolo planned a shopping-apartment-office complex nearby, so Garfield Mall was scaled down and the department stores slated for Garfield Mall instead signed with DeBartolo.

Randall Park Mall was built on the site of the Randall Park Race Track, a horse racing park immediately south of Thistledown Race Track. DeBartolo envisioned Randall Park as a "city within a city", with the mall, with 200 shops, three 14-story apartments, two 20-story office buildings, and a performing arts center that was intended to compete with the Front Row Theater. The total construction cost was $175 million($770 million in 2025).

Randall Park Mall opened on August 11, 1976. The mall's architect, Frank DeBartolo (Edward's younger brother), opened the mall with actress Dina Merrill in 1976. Upon its opening, the mall had 5 anchor stores: Sears, JCPenney, the May Company, Higbee's, and Horne's. JCPenney opened in March 1976, five months before the rest of the mall. Sears did not open until February 1977. When it opened, Randall Park claimed the title of "The World's Largest Shopping Center", but the title was short-lived. In 1992, DeBartolo announced major remerchandising plans.

=== Movie theaters ===
When it opened in 1976, Randall Park Mall had a three-screen cinema run by General Cinema Corporation. The lobby was one storefront wide, with steep steps leading to the concession stand. The screens were in three side by side auditoriums that opened off the concession stand level. More steps led up a second story to restrooms, the projection booth, and GCC office space.

The cinema became a second-run theater in 1991, and closed in 1993. After that, until the mall's closure, it was used as storage for Diamond's Men's Store, its adjoining neighbor. By the 2000s, Diamond's had extended its display window to include the theater's entrance.

In 1999, Loews Cineplex Entertainment opened the 12-screen Magic Johnson Theatres in the space. The theater became O Theater (with the slogan "O what a bargain!"), after AMC Theatres bought Loews Cineplex Entertainment in 2006. O Theater offered first-run movies at matinee prices but the theater closed in early 2009.

=== Decline and closure ===
The mall's decline began in December 1994 when Edward J. DeBartolo died. Two years after DeBartolo’s death, DeBartolo Realty Corporation merged with competitor Simon Property Group to form Simon DeBartolo Group, gaining ownership of Randall Park. The next year, the mall's occupancy was 73%, which was well below the national average of 85%. However, by 2000, that figure had reached 92%, fostering hopes of a full recovery for the institution, though these hopes were short lived once JCPenney announced the closure of its outlet store at the mall that autumn.

The first anchor store to close at the mall was Horne's, which closed when the chain filed for bankruptcy in 1992. That same year, Higbee's was renovated into Dillard's, and in 1993 The May Company became Kaufmann's. Three years after that, the lower level of the Horne's store was converted into LaSalle Furniture and the upper level was converted into Burlington Coat Factory. The JCPenney store was converted into an outlet store in October 1998, but closed in January 2001 due to falling sales and as a result of closures of 44 locations nationwide. Dillard's closed its Randall Park Mall Store in March 2003, shortly after an incident where an off duty police officer, who was moonlighting as a security guard, apprehended a suspected shoplifter and injured him by slamming his head on the floor. The suspect died in the hospital two days later. In May 2003, two months after the closure of the Dillard's store, the security guard was sentenced to three years in prison for involuntary manslaughter of the suspect. By 2004, about 50% of the mall was vacant, including the former Dillard's and JCPenney. The infrastructure was physically dilapidated, and many area residents viewed the mall as unsafe. Many of the vacant store fronts were completely walled off and the escalators and fountains were not operating. In 2002, the mall was sold to the Farbman Group. In turn they sold Randall Park to investor Haywood Whichard for $6 million – just fifteen percent of the original construction cost. As the mall declined, the stores and surrounding buildings did also.

Kaufmann's was rebranded into Macy's in 2006. In June 2007, it was announced that Cleveland-based trade school Ohio Technical College would acquire more than 200,000 square feet (19,000 m^{2}) of space at the mall. The school's PowerSports Institute occupied the former JCPenney and Firestone Complete Auto Care areas. On December 28, 2007, it was announced that Macy’s would close three stores in Ohio, with the Randall Park location among them. The store's final day of business was February 16, 2008.

On May 21, 2008, North Randall mayor David Smith announced that Whichard Real Estate had decided to close the mall by June 12, 2008. The few dozen small stores inside the sprawling, mostly empty, mall had until June 12 to close or move into empty storefronts on nearby roads. Burlington Coat Factory and Sears, which could be accessed from outside the mall, would stay open, as would the movie theater and Ohio Technical College's PowerSport Institute.

County records showed the company owed more than $200,000 in delinquent property taxes, and had taken out multiple mortgages on the mall. On June 5, 2008, it was announced that Randall Park Mall was being sold for an undisclosed sum to United Church Builders. The deal was expected to be finalized in the next 30 to 90 days. Ken Geis, CEO of UCB, felt it could be best suited for housing, education, research, and medical operations. As of May 2009, UCB had not finalized the deal for the mall.

On February 26, 2009, Sears announced that it would close its Randall Park location, as part of an effort to close 24 under-performing Sears and Kmart locations across the country. The last of the remaining small inside stores closed or moved by March 12, 2009, the same day the mall closed, leaving the mall empty aside from Burlington Coat Factory, Sears, Ohio Technical College's satellite campus, and Furniture Mattress Liquidators, all of which had direct external access. All power to the mall was turned off in May 2009. Sears closed on June 14, 2009.

From 2013 to 2015, Cleveland-based photographer and artist Johnny Joo photographed the mall in a state of abandonment. Joo's photos were shared around the world when posted in a 2014 Buzzfeed article on abandoned malls across the United States.

In March 2014, North Randall leaders announced that the vacant mall would be demolished by Industrial Realty Group for the purpose of constructing an industrial park. Property transfer occurred mid-July of that year; demolition began the following December 29.

Demolition of the mall began December 29, 2014, on the former Higbee's/Dillard's anchor store, followed by the mall interior. The demolition and excavation company Sitetech Inc. of Grafton, Ohio was hired to perform the work. As of July 2015, only the former anchor buildings (excluding the former Dillard's) remained standing.

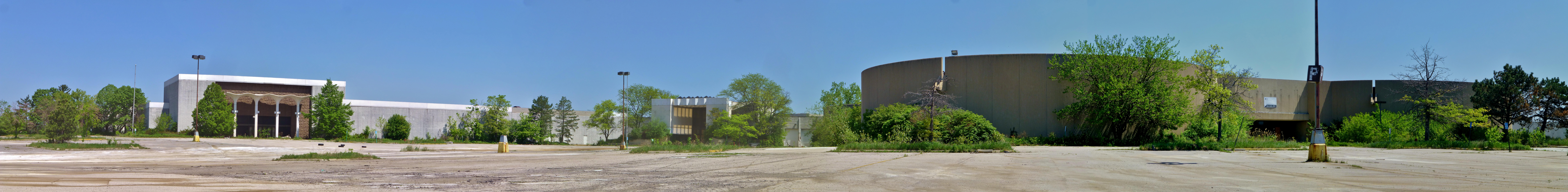
Randall Park Mall in 2014

On January 16, 2015, Burlington Coat Factory closed.

On May 5, 2016, calls came into the North Randall Fire Department (NRFD) for the former Magic Johnson Theater. Five surrounding agencies were dispatched to the theater. The fire was ruled an arson by the NRFD.

In July 2017, reports emerged that online retailer Amazon was considering the site of the former mall as a space for a new fulfillment center. On August 25, 2017, it was officially announced that Amazon would demolish the mall's remaining anchor stores and build an 855,000-square-foot warehouse, bringing 2,000 full-time jobs to the region.

All remaining anchor buildings were demolished in August 2017, except for the former Sears which was repurposed as a building for other businesses and Amazon opened the facility in 2018.

== See also ==
- Forest Fair Mall, another popular now-demolished mall in Ohio
- Rolling Acres Mall, another mall in Ohio that was replaced by an Amazon Fulfillment Center
