= Solape Akinpelu =

Nigerian business executive

- Born: Nigeria
- Citizenship: Nigerian
- Occupations: Entrepreneur, Business Executive
- Known for: Founder of Hervest (a fintech platform supporting women in agriculture)
- Title: CEO of Hervest

Solape Akinpelu is a Nigerian business executive. She is the chief executive officer and co-founder of HerVest. She is also the Technology Chair of the Nigerian-British Chamber of Commerce.

== Education and career ==
Solape is from Ijebu Ode. She has a bachelor's degree from Olabisi Onabanjo University and a master's degree in communications from the University of Lagos. She went on to work in advertising and marketing. She started Hervest as a service for women to access savings, investment, and credit facilities. HerVest also targets and serves smallholder female farmers.

She is a member of the Presidential High-Level Advisory Committee for the President of Nigeria on Women and Girls' Economic Empowerment. She is on the Gender Committee Desk at Central Bank of Nigeria on Framework for Advancing Women's Financial Inclusion.

== Awards ==
Solape won the Women in Tech Award at Art of Technology Lagos in 2024. She is one of the 10 finalists for the 2025 Aurora Tech Award by InDrive.
