= Dr. Richard A. Vladovic Harbor Teacher Preparation Academy =

Location
- 1111 Figueroa Pl. Wilmington, Los Angeles, California, California 90744-2311; United States; 33.784199°N 118.283699°W

Information
- Former name: Harbor Teacher Preparation Academy
- Type: Public
- Established: 2002
- School district: Los Angeles Unified School District (LAUSD)
- NCES District ID: 0622710
- NCES School ID: 062271010844
- Principal: Desiree Douglas Montoya
- Faculty: 18.02
- Grades: 9-12
- Enrollment: 452 (2024-25)
- Average class size: 27
- Student to teacher ratio: 25.08
- Colors: Red and Platinum
- Mascot: Monarchs
- Website: Harbor Teacher Preparation Academy

Dr. Richard A. Vladovic Harbor Teacher Preparation Academy (VHTPA), formerly Harbor Teacher Preparation Academy, is a Middle College Program high school established within Los Angeles Harbor College (LAHC) in Wilmington, Los Angeles, California, United States. It is currently under the jurisdiction of the Los Angeles Unified School District and is part of the Middle College National Consortium.

Under the middle college/dual enrollment program, students attend college courses at LAHC alongside high school classes, and can accumulate credits towards one or multiple associate degrees. Freshman and sophomores are automatically enrolled in "contract education" courses, college classes exclusive to VHTPA students. Upon entering junior year, students are allowed to self-enroll in college courses alongside LAHC underclassmen.

VHTPA is a California Distinguished School, with full accreditation under the Accrediting Commission for Schools, Western Association of Schools and Colleges, which certifies that "an institution meets or exceeds established standards and is achieving its own stated objectives". The academy received the National Blue Ribbon in 2008 and the California Gold Ribbon in 2015. U.S. News & World Report ranks VHTPA as #1 out of 181 high schools in LAUSD, #4 in the Los Angeles Metro Area, and #8 out of 1,675 high schools in California. The academy maintains a 100% graduation rate.

== History ==
In 2002, VHTPA was established as a product of collaboration between Los Angeles Harbor College and LAUSD's Local District 8.

Formerly hosted in a series of bungalows, construction of a multi-story facility was completed in spring of 2019. The academy also received its namesake, former district board member Dr. Richard A. Vladovic for great contributions to its establishment and maintaining.

== Demographic ==
As of the 2018–2019 school year, VHTPA is designated as a predominantly Hispanic, Black, Asian, and Other (PHBAO) School. Hispanic students represent the majority of the student body at 53%, whilst Asian and African-American/Black students trail at 30% and 11% respectively. As approximately 64% of students are eligible for free/reduced-price lunches under the National School Lunch Act, the school receives academic and financial support from Title I, Part A of the Elementary and Secondary Education Act.

== Notable alumni ==
- Isaac Yacob, NBA Assistant Coach
