= Northline, Houston =

Community district in Texas, United States

Northline is a community district located in North Houston, Texas near I-45. It is east of Acres Homes and South of Aldine. The area is mostly a Hispanic Community. The main roads are Airline Drive and Little York Road. Northline Mall used to be located in the area.

== Police service ==
The area is within the Houston Police Department's North Patrol Division with headquarters at 9455 West Montgomery Road.

== Education ==
Northline is served by the Houston Independent School District some are served by Aldine Independent School District.

Zoned schools include Northline Elementary School, Fonville Middle School, Ninth Grade Preparatory Academy, and Sam Houston Math, Science, and Technology Center.

== See also ==
- Northline Mall
- Northline Commons
