= Olubukola Mary Akinpelu =

Nigerian Registered nurse and educator

- Born: Olubukola Mary Akinpelu
- Occupation: Nurse educator

Academic background
- Education: Houston Community College, Lamar University (BSN), Texas Board of Nursing

Olubukola Mary Akinpelu, better known as Mylifeassugar, is a Nigerian-American registered nurse, nurse educator, and content creator. She is the author of The Ultimate Nursing School Study Guide.

She was awarded by Nigerian Books of Record, JOM Charity Award and Yessiey Awards because of her contributions to the health and nursing profession.

== Education ==
Olubukola hails from Lagelu LGA, Ibadan, Oyo State. She had her primary school education at East Gate, secondary at Federal Government Girls College, Oyo and Houston Community College before Earning her Bachelor of Science in Nursing (BSN) degree at Lamar University in Texas, USA, earning BSN. She moved to the United States to further her education, earning qualifications as a certified nurse from the Texas Board of Nursing.

== Career ==
Olubukola pioneered nurse care education and a system for providing care in rural communities. She played a crucial role in reducing the prevalence of diseases and improving overall healthcare in the country and contributed to the development of education programs in Nigeria for people and impoverished communities by educating them on sanitation practices.

She also championed increased access to nursing education and fought against discrimination in the profession. During the COVID-19 pandemic, she created healthcare content focused on nursing and also played a key role in Nigeria's healthcare by training nurses for free during the lockdown to support the government in reducing the spread of the virus.

Through the application of her Need Theory and also advanced nursing education and research by leading the nursing literature indexing project she helped shape nursing in Nigeria.

She is recognized among the top three practicing Nigeria nurses and the first nurse educator in her local community and in 2023, she was listed by Yessiey Magazine among the 100 most influential people in Africa.

== Awards and recognition ==
In 2021, the Nigerian Books of Record recognised her in honor of her achievements, In 2022 and 2023 she was awarded the JOM Charity Award and Yessiey Awards respectively.

She was listed among the top 100 most influential personalities in Africa and recognized among the top 3 Nigerian nurse educators.
