= Phonoscope Communications =

Phonoscope Communications is a broadband and communications provider with corporate headquarters in Houston, Texas. The company's infrastructure spans eight counties and reaches distant locations such as Baytown, Galveston, Freeport, Magnolia, Richmond-Rosenberg, Splendora, Texas City and Willis, Texas.

== History ==
Lee Cook and Houston bankers Jesse Jones and William T. Carter founded Phonoscope in 1953. In 1954, Cook invented the Phonoscope instrument (LightCar TM), a two-way audio and video communications device and forerunner to videoconferencing. In 1962, the Texas Attorney General granted Phonoscope public utility rights for voice and video communications. The same year, Phonoscope established a two-way videotelephony system for Galveston Independent School District, connecting eight elementary schools to the district's administration building using coaxial cable. In 1963, Phonoscope began to provide cable television to the NASA and Clear Lake areas near Houston. By 1989, Phonoscope had completed its large-scale fiber optic ring for Ethernet transport in Houston, encompassing all the major central business districts and the Medical Center. Phonoscope became the first to provide Houston residential customers with multi-internet speeds in 1996 and Houston's first Gigabit Ethernet data circuit connectivity provider in 1998. Phonoscope Global began providing IP services to Greater Houston in 2012. The following year, Phonoscope Fiber Communications brought fiber to the home with symmetrical gigabit bandwidth and residential services. In 2014, Phonoscope Fiber entered successful bids to provide dark fiber and 10 Gigabit Ethernet services to the Cypress Fairbanks Independent School District. The company sold their residential cable television business to OpTel Inc. in 1997. Phonoscope Fiber now offers FiberTV, a streaming IPTV service with local, business, and cable channels. Phonoscope continues to work with local area school districts, having since 2014 entered successful bids to provide dark fiber and 10 Gigabit Ethernet service to the Cypress Fairbanks Independent School District.

== Services ==
Today, Phonoscope Fiber offers a Metro Ethernet fiber network in the Houston area with enterprise network solutions, including internet access, private networks, Ethernet, dark fiber, IPTV, VoIP, and wireless backhaul. Phonoscope Fiber continues to offer fiber television, fiber internet, and fiber phone service to residential customers in Houston. Phonoscope Fiber also offers fiber optic-based services to MDUs (i.e., apartments) in Houston.

== Technology ==
Phonoscope Fiber offers 100% native Ethernet optical fiber using 100+ data ring networks' built-in redundancy and Layer 2 infrastructure. It has adopted equipment to accommodate the use of IPv6 and prepared its network to handle 10G to 40G and, potentially, 100G speeds.

== Controversies ==
The company incorrectly charged customers sales tax for Internet services for a period of two years after such charges were made illegal. Customers are currently being refunded.
