= East Early College High School =

School in Houston, Texas, United States

Location
- 220 North Milby Street; Houston, Harris County, Texas 77003; United States; 29.751961°N 95.333556°W

Information
- Type: Public high school
- School district: Houston Independent School District
- Principal: Dr. Claudia Castillo
- Faculty: 20.11 (FTE)
- Grades: 9-12
- Enrollment: 485 (2017-18)
- Student to teacher ratio: 24.12
- Color
- Rivals: Eastwood Academy High School
- Website: Official Website

East Early College High School (EECHS) is a secondary charter school at 220 N. Milby Street in Houston, Texas, United States with a ZIP code of 77003.

The school is operated by the Houston Independent School District in association with the Houston Community College System Southeast Campus and the Bill and Melinda Gates Foundation. The school is on the HCC Southeast Campus.

EECHS is a 2018 recipient of the U.S. Department of Education's Blue Ribbon School of Excellence award.

== History ==
East Early College High School opened in fall 2006. It was supported by the Houston Independent School District, Houston Community College, the Bill and Melinda Gates Foundation, and the Texas High School Project. Following EECHS' inaugural year, Texas Education Agency awarded the school with an "Exemplary" rating.

By 2009, construction began on the HCCS Felix Fraga Campus and the new East Early College facility. The facility, located at 220 N. Milby St. in Houston, TX, opened in August 2009 and was named in honor of Leonel Castillo, a Latino community activist in Houston, TX.

In 2012, under the leadership of Principal Tamera Bolden, East Early College High School received the National Blue Ribbon Award from the U.S. Department of Education - the highest award a school can receive. In November 2018 - the first year of eligibility since the 2012 award - Principal Stephanie Square accepted East Early's second National Blue Ribbon Award in Washington D.C.

== Student body ==
As of August 2019, East Early College High School serves about 460 students and their families.

== Admissions ==
Students interested in attending East Early College High School are required to submit applications.
