= Live Oak Brewing Company =

American Brewery

Coordinates: 30°13′15″N 97°39′40″W

- Location: Austin, Texas
- Opened: 1997
- Owned by: Chip McElroy

Active beers
Name	Type
Pilz	Czech-style Pilsener
Big Bark	Vienna Lager
HefeWeizen	Bavarian Wheat Ale
Grodziskie	Grodziskie

Seasonal beers
Name	Type
Oaktoberfest	Märzen
Primus	Weizenbock
Gold	German Pilsner
Pre-War Pils	Early American Pilsner

Live Oak Brewing Company located in Austin, Texas, is a locally owned and operated brewery. The brewery produces four year-round beers as well as nearly 20 more seasonal (or limited release) beers. Live Oak beers are available on draft across Texas at bars and restaurants. In 2016, Live Oak began canning their beers for retail sale at grocery, liquor, and convenience stores across the state.

While Live Oak uses industry standard step mashing for most of their beers, they use a more difficult and rarely used old world style of mashing known as decoction mashing for a few of their beers, most notably the Live Oak Pilz and the Oaktoberfest.

Live Oak uses large, horizontal dairy tanks as fermenting vessels instead of the more traditional cylindroconical fermenters.

From 1997 to 2015, the brewery was run out of rented industrial space on East 5th Street in central Austin. In December 2015, the company relocated to a new brewery and taproom facility built on 20 acres (81,000 m^{2}) of undeveloped land on the Colorado river just north of the Austin-Bergstrom International Airport. Construction of the new facility took 11 months.

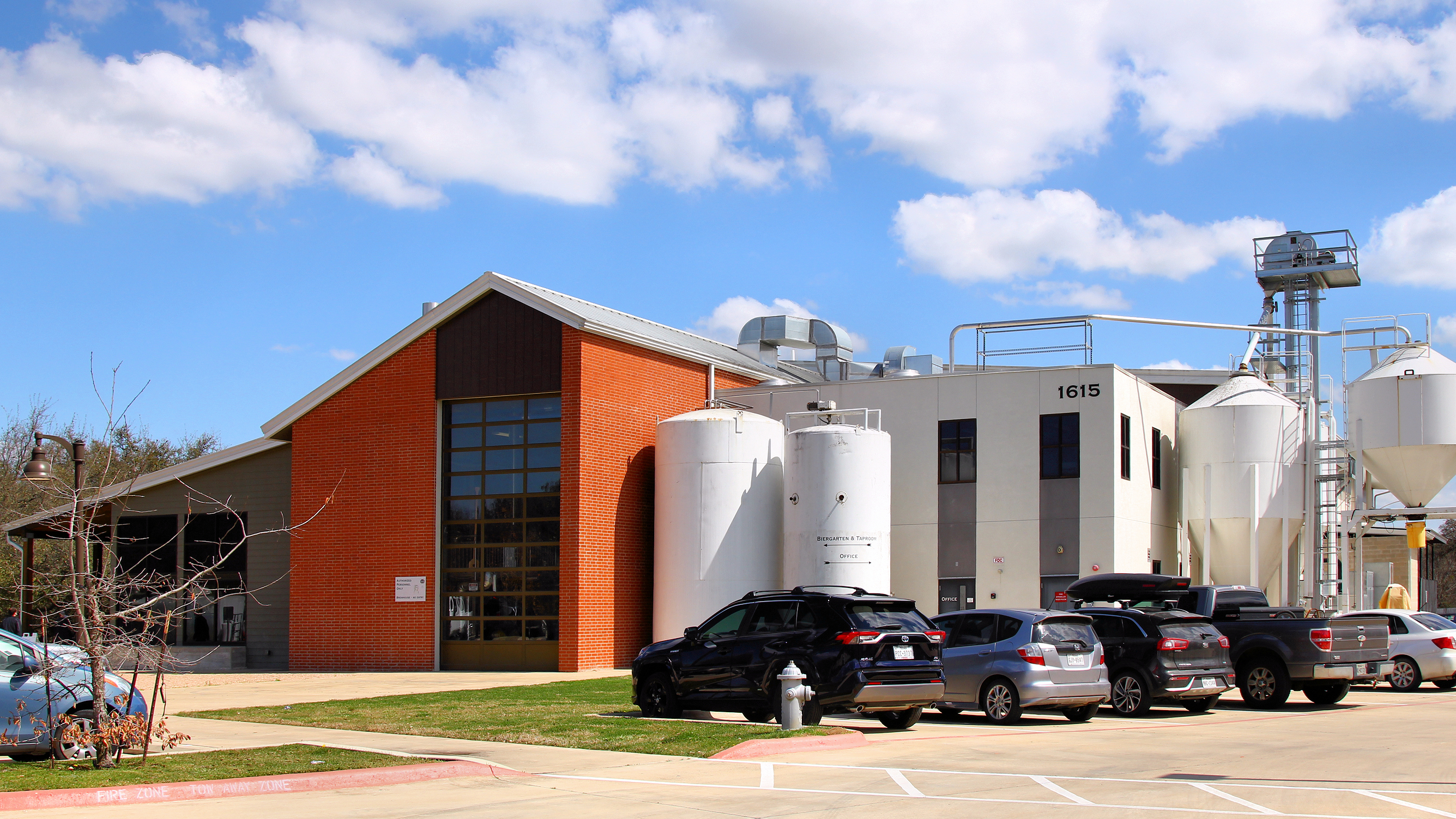
Live Oak Brewing Company brewery and taproom.

The Live Oak Brewing Company Taproom & Biergarten is family-friendly and open to the public, home of The Black Forest food truck, group events, public brewery tours, beer release parties, art markets, trivia nights, beer and food events, Rolling Roadshows, and more.

In 2018, Chip and head-brewer, Dusan Kwiatkowski, traveled to Grodzisk Wielkopolski, Poland, to learn more about the beer-making traditions of the Grodziskie style beer. Together with Browar Grodzisk a collaboration beer was born, Grodziskie Imperialne, with stronger notes of oak smoke and bitterness exceeding the Grodzisk standards.

In 2019, Live Oak Brewing took home a bronze medal from The Great American Beer Festival for their Hefeweizen.
