= North Houston Early College High School =

High school in Texas, United States

Coordinates: 29.834679°N 95.375977°W

North Houston Early College High School (NHECHS) is a secondary charter school located at 8001 Fulton St. Building C in Northside Houston, Texas, United States.

The school is operated by the Houston Independent School District in association with the Houston Community College System-Northeast Campus. The school is located next to the HCC Northline building of the HCC-Northeast Campus.

The school used to be housed in portable buildings from 2008 to 2016. Then, in the school year starting in 2016, the school opened their doors to their new three-story building on the Houston Community College campus.
