= Northline Commons =

Northline Mall
- Location: Houston, Texas, United States
- Coordinates: 29.8313°N 95.3797°W
- Address: 4400 North Freeway
- Opened: 1963
- Closed: 2007 (Northline Mall only)
- Developer: Berenson Associates Inc.
- Architect: Berenson Associates Inc.
- Num. of anchor tenants: 3
- Floors: 1
- Public transit: METRO Routes 23, 29, 36, 45, 56, 79, 96 and METRORail Red Line Northline Transit Center/HCC

Northline Mall was a shopping mall in the Northline area of Houston, Texas, United States, at the northeast corner of Interstate 45, and Crosstimbers Road. It is the new location of Northline Commons.

== History ==
Boston, Massachusetts-based Berenson Associates Inc. developed the mall in the 1960s. Northline Mall opened in 1963 as one of Houston's first premier weather-controlled malls.

Beginning in the 2000s Northline Mall was redeveloped from a traditional mall to an 850,000-square-foot (79,000 m^{2}) open air "power center" consisting of "big box" retail and general merchandise stores. Eastbourne Investments, a New York City real estate fund, bought a 50 percent equity stake in Northline on December 31, 2004. Berenson hired Fidelis Realty Partners, a firm in Houston, to redevelop the mall and repopulate it with tenants.

Walmart purchased 19 acres (77,000 m^{2}) from the owners for a Supercenter, located at Crosstimbers and Fulton, adjacent to new multi-tenant retail buildings. Houston Community College also acquired land for a new campus on about 14 acres (57,000 m^{2}) along the Fulton side of the property.

== Notable incidents ==
=== Wall collapse ===
On January 31, 1997, a 20-foot wall on the south end of Northline Mall, where the former Joske's building was being demolished to make way for the incoming Magic Johnson Theatres cinema, collapsed, killing three people.
