= Rahr and Sons Brewing Company =

Brewery in Fort Worth, Texas, USA

Coordinates: 32.736978°N 97.326963°W

Rahr & Sons Brewing Company
- Industry: Alcoholic beverage
- Founded: 2004
- Headquarters: Near Southside, Fort Worth, Texas, USA
- Products: Beer
- Owner: Fritz Rahr

Rahr and Sons Brewing Company is a brewery in Fort Worth, Texas, USA, owned by Fritz Rahr. Since opening in 2004 Rahr has released numerous beers. Their core lineup is made up of 6 year-round beers, including their newest year-round release, Rahr’s Original. Along with these, they release 4 seasonals, and several specialty beers throughout the year. Rahr is currently distributed in most of Texas, Oklahoma, Kansas, Louisiana, New Mexico, Tennessee, Missouri, Arkansas, and Nebraska.

== Early history ==
The Rahr and Sons brewery was established in 2004 in a warehouse south of downtown Fort Worth by Frederick "Fritz" and Rahr, with a great deal of support from family and friends. Fritz Rahr, a former railroad company worker who has studied brewing in Germany and at the Siebel Institute, is a graduate of Texas Christian University in Fort Worth. When the brewery began production in the summer of 2004, its original head brewer was Jason Courtney, the 2002 Great American Beer Festival Small Brew Pub Brew Master of the Year, who had run Hub City Brewpub in Lubbock, Texas. Courtney installed the brewery and created the original recipes.

After Courtney's departure, James Hudec of Brenham Brewery was named brewer for the following six months. At first, all of the Rahr beers were self-distributed. Rahr's first two beers were Blonde Lager and Rahr's Red amber lager. These were not available in bottles until December 2004, the same month in which Rahr's third beer, Ugly Pug Black Lager, was released. In July 2005, after months of tap-only availability, Ugly Pug appeared in bottles as well.

== Developments since 2005 ==
In September 2005, Rahr introduced its first seasonal beer: Pecker Wrecker Imperial Pilsner, a Sterling- and Perle-hopped pilsener with the substantial strength of 7% alcohol by volume (ABV). This tap-only release was accompanied by a logo design contest, in which entries had to include a woodpecker in a tow truck. The winning logo appeared on tap handles, T-shirts, and beer glasses.

At about the same time, Rahr was forced to lay off most of his employees due to financial pressures and take on the role of brewmaster himself. In the wake of this change, Rahr worked long hours and received help from a volunteer team of over two dozen local home brewers and beer enthusiasts, particularly with bottling and packaging. At this point, the company also shifted the task of distribution over to distributors in the Dallas-Fort Worth area, including the regional Coors distributor and Authentic Beverages Co., Inc.; as a result, Rahr beer became available across a larger geographic area. By the next year, the Miller distributor in Denton was handling the supply for the Denton/north Dallas region.

Rahr's Bucking Bock appeared in the spring of 2006 and was preceded by a logo contest similar to the one for Pecker Wrecker. Summertime Wheat appeared on July 8, followed in November by Winter Warmer, the first non-German Rahr beer.

In January 2007, Tony Formby joined Rahr as an equity partner. Following this, the company re-expanded its staff. Gavin Secchi of Addison was hired as brewer. Two new beers were introduced by Rahr in 2007: Stormcloud IPA, released in March, and Oktoberfest Fall Celebration Lager, released in September. Rahr began working with Andrews Distributing of Dallas in autumn 2007.

== Current line of products ==
- Blonde Lager is a light-bodied Munich Helles-style lager with a grainy character, a faint sweetness, and a bitter finish.
- Rahr's Red is an amber lager with a malty character and light caramel notes.
- Iron Thistle is a dark brown Scottish style ale characterized by a bold taste dominated by a smooth, sweet maltiness balanced with a low, hoppy bitterness. This brew is only featured from January through February.
- Ugly Pug is a black lager, or Schwarzbier. While dark in color, it is light-bodied and has a moderately roasted flavor.
- Stormcloud IPA is an India Pale Ale, a popular style among American craft breweries. What is unusual about Stormcloud IPA, however, is the use of German noble hops, German malts and Kölsch ale yeast to imbue the style with Fritz Rahr's own German brewing heritage (American IPAs are typically brewed with American hop styles and other varieties of ale yeast). Likewise, the beer is marketed with a German heritage backstory that reinforces this stylistic hybridity. "Stormcloud" is English for the German Sturmwolke, the name of the ship that carried brewer-ancestor William Rahr to the New World. According to the brewery's website, "During a fierce storm on his voyage across the ocean, William Rahr could be heard yelling from the tall masted ship: 'Roll on old sea! And when you are done, when the storm clouds have destroyed themselves, we will still be standing and drinking!'" According to local journalist Barry Shlachter, this beer may become Rahr's flagship product in the future.
- Bucking Bock, a spring seasonal, is a sweet and full-flavored Maibock. With 8% ABV (alcohol by volume), it is also particularly strong. This brew is available from March through April.
- Summertime Wheat, a summer seasonal, is a Bavarian-style wheat beer, or Hefeweizen, with rye added to the grist (the brewery has called it a Roggen-Weizen, or rye-wheat, for this reason). Unlike many American craft breweries that produce Hefeweizens with more neutral yeasts (e.g. Sierra Nevada, Pyramid, or Spoetzl (Shiner)), Rahr employs the characteristic Bavarian wheat beer yeast, resulting in clove- and banana-like flavors. This brew is available from May through June.
- Gravel Road is a seasonal alt bier. This brew is available from July through August.
- Oktoberfest Fall Celebration Lager is a fall seasonal in the Bavarian Märzen lager style. This brew is available from September through October.
- Winter Warmer is a winter seasonal rendition of the traditional English "winter warmer" style. This is a toasty, nutty, lightly carbonated ale with about 8% ABV. This brew is available from November through December.

== Iron Mash Competition ==
Since the summer of 2004, the Rahr and Sons Brewery has been the location of the annual Iron Mash Competition, a homebrewing competition based on the premise of the television show Iron Chef (that is, to brew a beer from provided ingredients) and hosted by the Cap and Hare Homebrewing Club of Fort Worth, TX.

== Awards and recognition ==
At the summer 2005 semiannual United States Beer Tasting Championship (referred to as USBTC from this point on), Rahr's Blonde Lager won the award of Best of the Rockies/Southeast in the Dortmunder/Helles category. This beer won the same award again in summer 2006, while Bucking Bock won honorable mention in the division as a Maibock. Rahr's Ugly Pug won Best of the Rockies/Southwest at the winter 2006 USBTC in the Black Lager category. Most recently, Rahr's Summertime Wheat was recognized as the best wheat beer in the Rockies/Southwest division during the summer 2007 USBTC.

The Dallas Observer awarded Rahr's Blonde Lager "Best Local Beer" in the summer of 2005.

In the Zymurgy magazine reader's poll of summer 2006—the fourth annual Best Commercial Beers In America survey--, Rahr was voted the fifth best brewer in the United States. Among the poll's top ranked beers in the U.S., Ugly Pug tied for 15th place, Bucking Bock and Rahr's Red both tied for 21st place, and Blonde Lager tied for 32nd place.

== Community Involvement ==
Rahr also sponsors a local adult soccer club, called the Rahr Football Club. The club has won 11 FWASA League titles and 3 Tournament titles to date. Currently, the club has 8 teams and roughly 120 members playing in the Fort Worth Adult Soccer Association.
