= Saint Arnold Brewing Company =

Craft Brewery in Houston, Texas

Coordinates: 29°46′16.99″N 95°20′53.93″W

- Texas' Oldest Craft Brewery
- Location: Houston, Texas, USA
- Opened: 1994
- Annual production volume: 58,397 US beer barrels (68,528 hL) (2013)
- Owned by: Brock Wagner

Active beers
Name	Type
Fancy Lawnmower	German-Style Kölsch
Weedwacker	Hefeweizen/Kölsch
Santo	Black Kölsch
5 O'Clock Pils	Bohemian Pilsner
Amber Ale	Amber Ale
Ale Wagger	Brown Ale
Elissa IPA	India Pale Ale
Art Car IPA	American IPA
Endeavour	Double IPA
Raspberry AF	Berliner Weiss
Pub Crawl	Pale Ale
Orange Show	Blonde Ale

Seasonal beers
Name	Type
Spring Bock (Spring)	Bock
Summer Pils (Summer)	Helles
Oktoberfest (Fall)	Scottish Ale
Pumpkinator (Fall)	Imperial Stout
Christmas Ale (Winter)	Old Ale
Cut With Bread Pudding (Winter)	Old Ale with Spices
White Noise (Winter)	Dry Hopped Belgian Wit

Other beers
Name	Type
Icon Series	Iconic Styles
Divine Reserve Series	Single Batch Beers
Bishop's Barrel Series	Wood-Aged Beers

The Saint Arnold Brewing Company is a craft brewery in Houston, Texas, United States, named after a patron saint of brewing, Saint Arnulf of Metz. It was founded in 1994 by Brock Wagner and Kevin Bartol, graduates of Rice University. The brewery offers tours every weekday and Saturday afternoons, which have attracted a large following. Saint Arnold has won numerous national and international awards including Mid Size Brewery of The Year 2017.

== History ==
Saint Arnold Brewing Company was founded in 1994 and was originally located on the far northwest side of Houston. It operated out of that location for more than fifteen years.

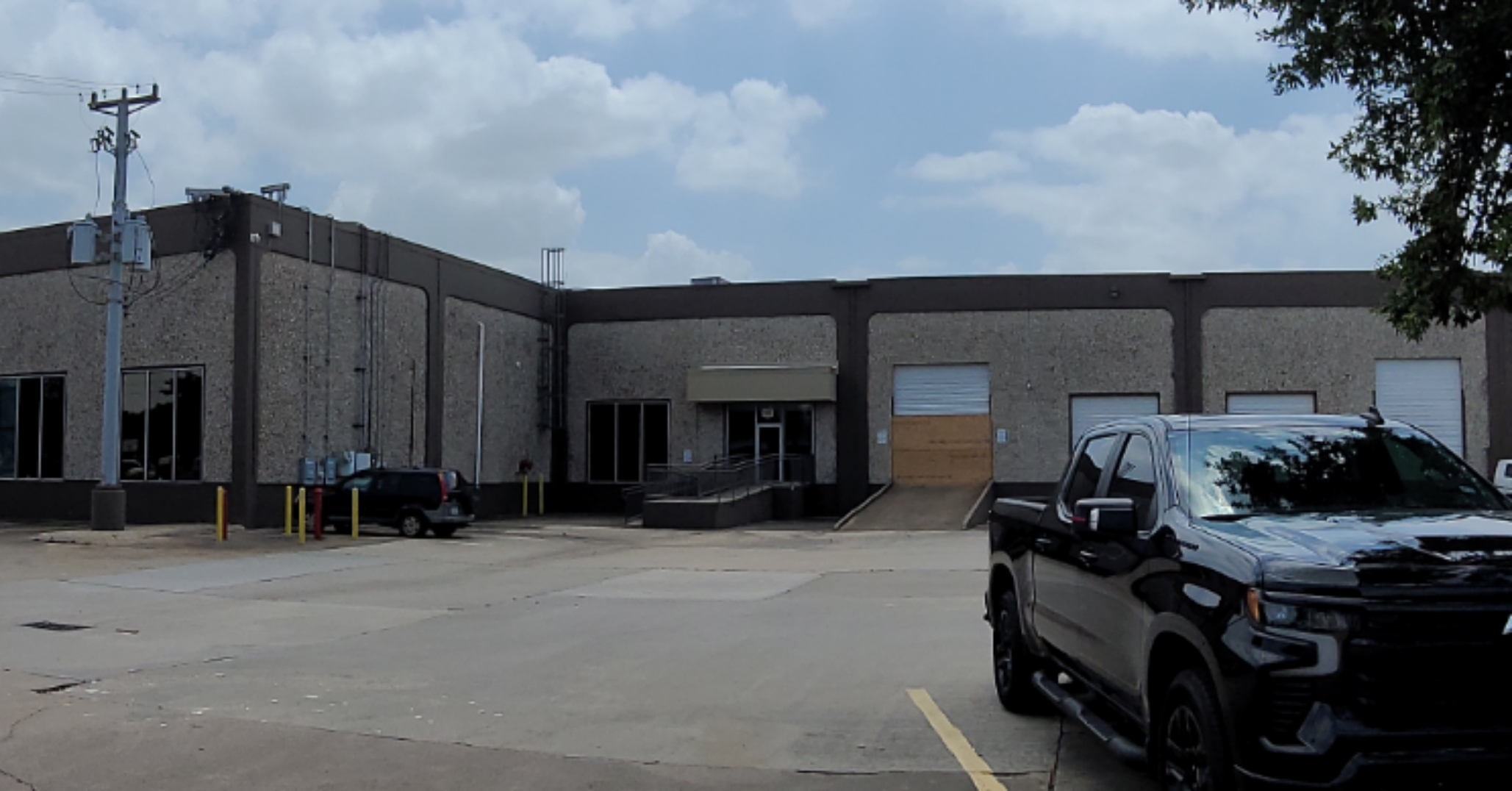
Original Saint Arnolds Location at 2522 Fairway Park Dr

Brock Wagner, a resident of Southgate in Houston and a graduate of Rice University, founded the company and, as of 2003, owns it.

In 2008, St. Arnold announced that it planned to move from its northwest Houston facility to a new facility in the Northside district, north of Downtown Houston. By 2009 the company had purchased a three-story 104,000-square-foot (9,700 m^{2}) square foot brick building, constructed in 1914, which most recently served as a food service facility for the Houston Independent School District. The prominent location of the new brewery on the highway was key to its selection. The redevelopment effort was expected to take a year to complete and cost a total of almost $6 million. Due to unforeseen events, such as the theft of copper pipes from the building, the move was delayed and was not completed until the spring of 2010.

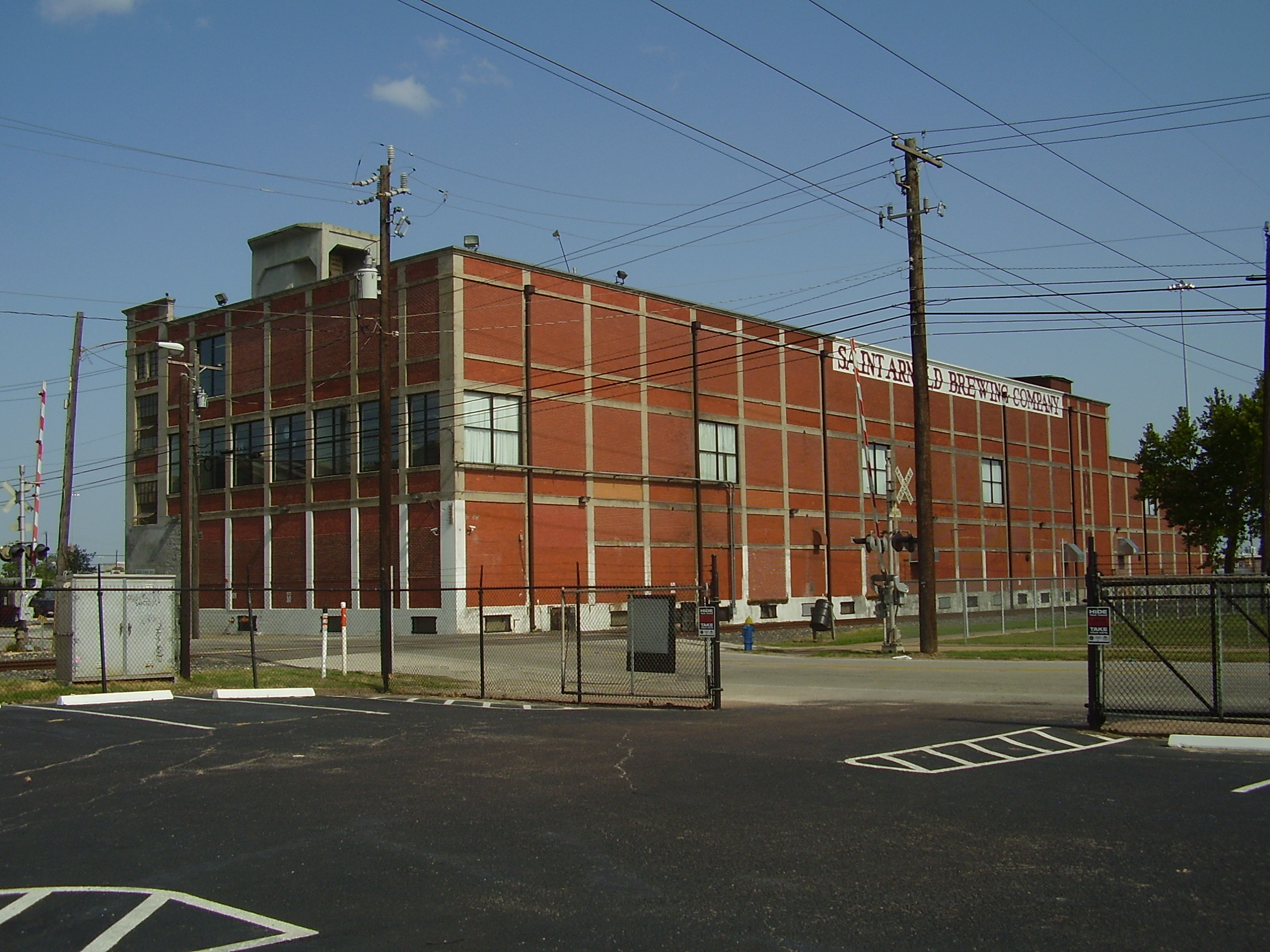
The Saint Arnold Brewing Company plant, the former Houston Independent School District Food Service Department Building

A new round of investing to help finance the new brewery gave 100 investors 30% of the company at an average investment of $25,000 each. St. Arnold also received a bank loan from the Small Business Administration at a 4.17% interest rate over 20 years. The brewery anticipated brewing over 30,000 barrels in 2010, up from 26,000 barrels at their previous location. The maximum capacity of the new brewery is over 100,000 barrels. In 2018, the company opened a beer garden attached to the brewery with a taproom, restaurant, and gift shop.

In 2019, they made a wager against Washington, DC–based DC Brau in which the winner of the World Series receives the loser's signature brews, plus other stuff from the barrel room. They lost.

In mid-July 2020, the Texas Alcoholic Beverage Commission decided to shut down dine-in service amidst the ongoing COVID-19 pandemic. The TABC previously stated that most breweries with kitchens were allowed to keep their bars open, even as bars & taprooms in the state were forced to shut down.

== Marketing ==
The brewery markets and distributes its beer throughout Texas and Louisiana. Saint Arnold's marketing includes community events, social media brewery tours, product sampling and e-mail marketing to grow its business. It has an e-mail list of 30,000 people and has run innovative programs like auctioning off naming rights to its brewing vessels on eBay.

== Recycling program ==
The brewery offers an uncommon recycling program through which usable bottle carriers may be redeemed for promotional merchandise. 200,000 bottle carriers can be redeemed for the official St. Arnold's 1957 Bentley.

== Gallery ==
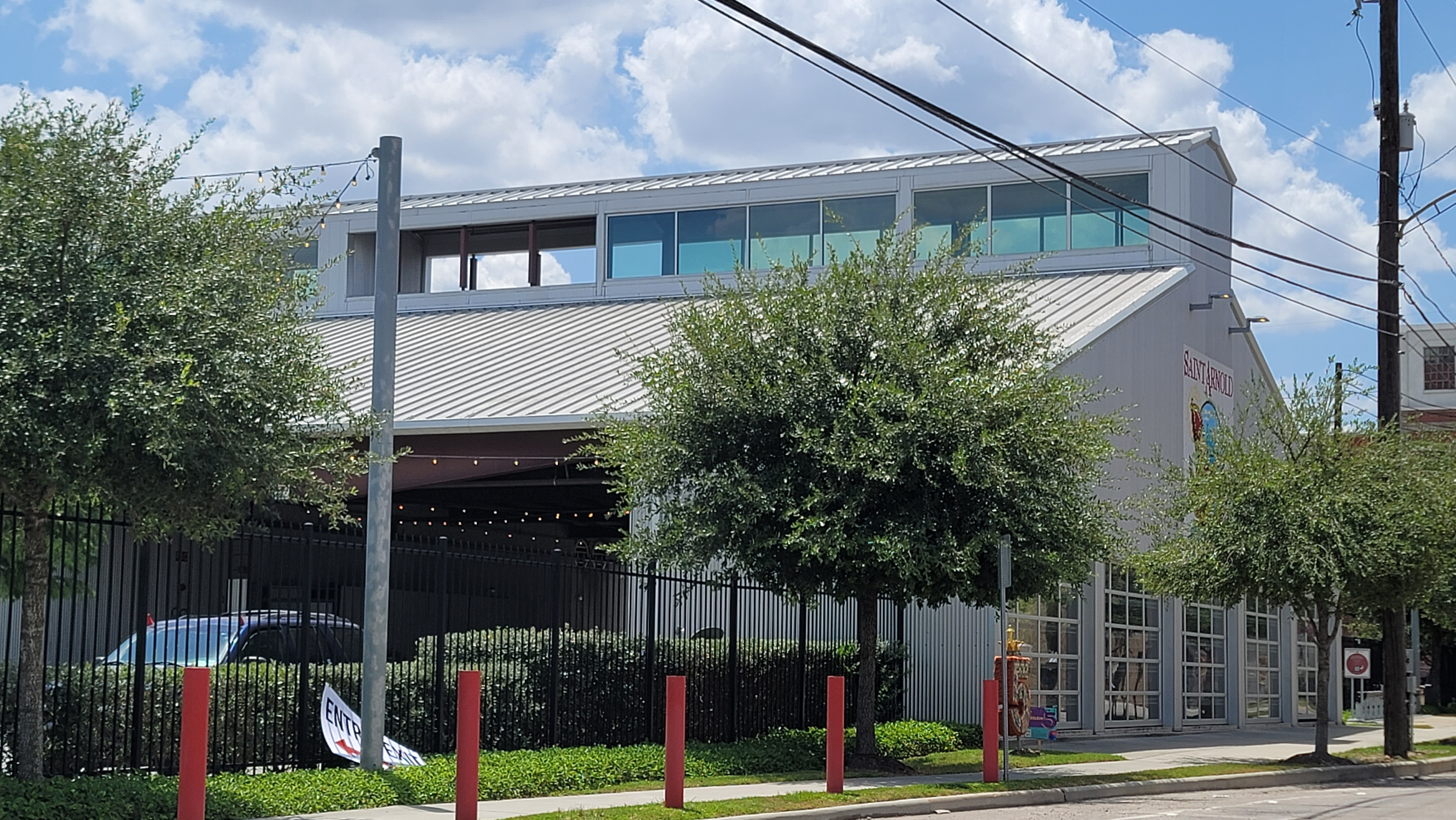
St. Arnold's Brewery beer garden

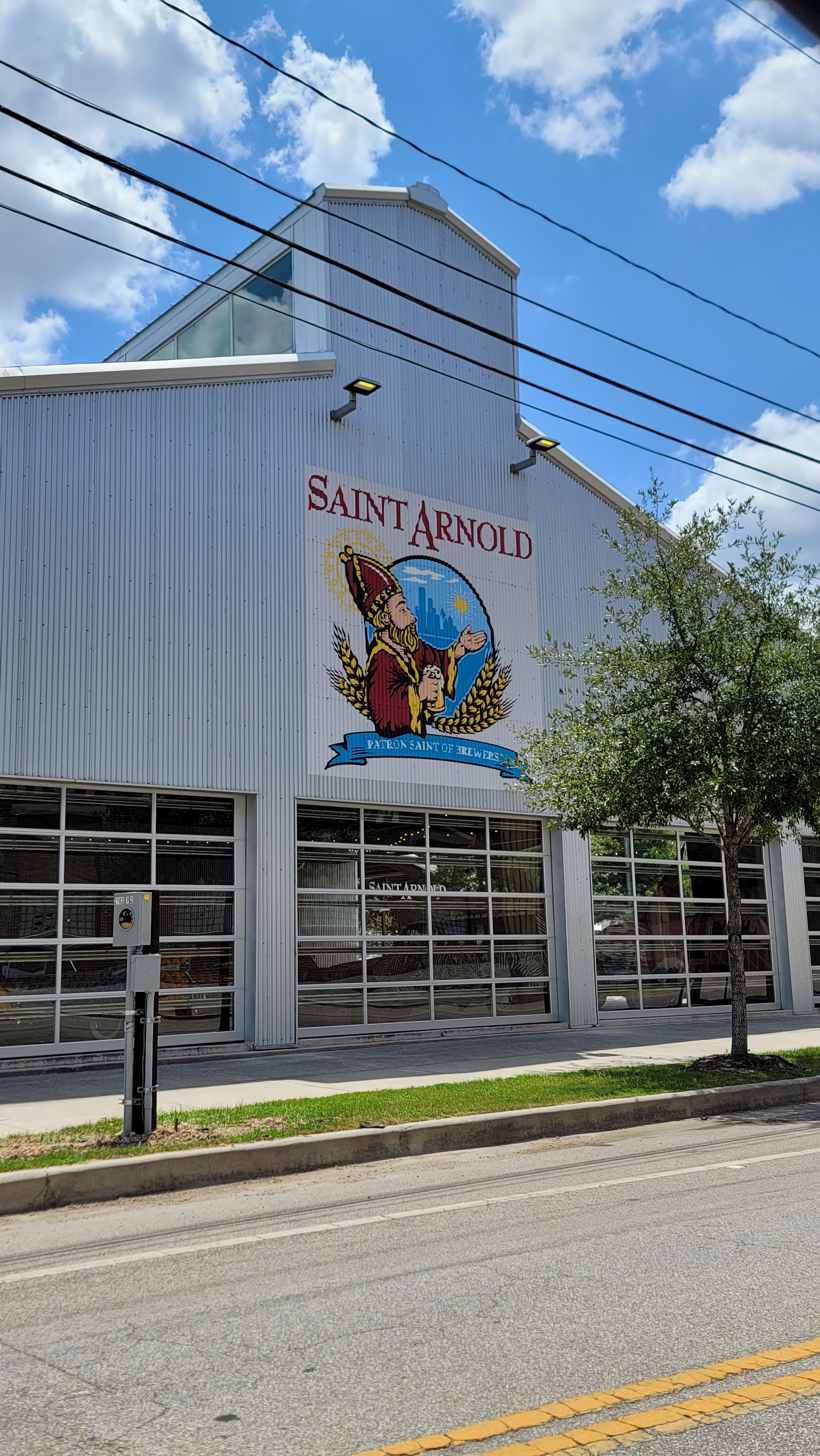
St. Arnold's Brewery beer garden logo
