= Link Valley, Houston =

Populated place in Texas

Coordinates: 29.677°N 95.437°W

Link Valley is a community in southwestern Houston, Texas that consists of many apartment complexes. In the late 1980s it was nicknamed "Death Valley" due to high levels of drug-related and violent crime. Since a 1989 raid Link Valley has not had significant criminal activity.

== History ==
The apartments were developed in the 1960s, when the area was considered to be suburban. Originally athletes, medical students, airline employees, local people, and young professionals lived there. At the time the 610 Loop had been newly constructed. At one time 5,000 people lived in the apartments. Robert Cullick, a member of the Houston Chronicle Austin bureau, said that as the apartments were built, residents of nearby residential subdivisions shunned them because the apartment residents were transient and of a lower socioeconomic status. The residential neighborhoods were deed restricted, preventing rental units from being built within. This caused apartments to be concentrated in the same areas. The apartments did not have recreational facilities. Cullick believed that the isolation caused Link Valley to become a crime-ridden area in the 1980s. In the 1970s through the mid-1980s Link Valley remained middle class.

As Greater Houston developed, newer and more luxurious apartment complexes further away from the city core opened. Gradually the Link Valley apartments lost favor. The large number of apartments in Greater Houston caused prices of renting apartments in Link Valley to decrease. As a result of the 1980s oil glut, Houston's real estate market declined. The landlords were forced to further reduce rents, but there were insufficient tenants to keep the apartments profitable. In Link Valley many of the apartments were bankrupt and foreclosed. Jeff Kunerth of the Orlando Sentinel said that a "general abandonment" occurred. The apartments became known for drug dealing and vagrancy. After an elderly woman in a nearby community was murdered by residents of the area, homeowners put pressure on the city to clean up the community. A 1989 raid removed many drug dealers, vandals, vagrants, and drug addicts from the Link Valley community.

In 1991 the City of Houston financed the demolition of several derelict structures in Link Valley. In 1993 a developer offered to buy 75 acres (30 ha) of vacant land south of the apartments, near West Bellfort Road, and also to buy out some of the old apartments, so residential and commercial projects could be built. The developers hoped to obtain around 125 acres (51 ha) of land. By 2004 several streets near Link Valley had townhouses each worth around $200,000.

== Cityscape ==
Link Valley is in southwestern Houston, located off of Stella Link Road, and south of and along the 610 Loop. It consists of apartments centered on Link Valley Drive. The development is 2 miles (3.2 km) west of the Reliant Astrodome and is about a 10-minute driving distance to Downtown Houston. Link Valley is also in proximity to the Texas Medical Center and Hobby Airport. The 27-acre (11 ha) Link Valley area is the size of Eola Park in Downtown Orlando, Florida. The community has six city blocks. Link Valley was adjacent to a community of brick houses. That community was originally Jewish, but in 1989 it was a racially mixed community.

The apartments were clustered together, and had over 3,000 units. The apartments had brick façades, colonial style pillars, hardwood floors, and balconies made of wrought iron. Apartment dining rooms had chandeliers. Names of complexes included Alsace, Chez Charme, Provence, Royale, and Starlight Arms. In the late 1980s, when Link Valley became a center for drug dealing, many of the apartments had no appliances, plumbing, and wiring. Trash was a common feature in Link Valley. Gregory Curtis of Texas Monthly said that, after the police raid in 1989, the names of the apartments sounded like "cynical jokes". Curtis added that, in 1989, the apartments had "disintegrated to the point where restoration seems impossible and their demolition would be a blessing."

== Government and infrastructure ==
The community has been served by the Houston Police Department Southwest (Beechnut) Patrol Division.

The Houston City Council District K serves Link Valley. During the 2000s and prior to 2011 it was a part of city council district C. In the 1980s and 1990s it was in District D.

== Crime ==
In the late 1980s the community was known for having an abundance of drug-related criminal activity. Houstonians (Houston citizens) nicknamed it "Death Valley" because many drug-related homicides occurred there. In a period over 10 years ending in 1989, many drug dealers and prostitutes operated in the area. Kim Cobb of the Houston Chronicle said that Link Valley's apartments, which were mostly vacant, appeared "like a war zone, buildings with broken windows, high weeds, boarded up buildings and an assortment of prostitutes and junkies." Gregory Curtis of the Texas Monthly said that Link Valley was "the closest we come in Texas to the total, bombed out devastation one sees in Newark or the South Bronx." Malcolm K. Sparrow, an author of Beyond 911: A New Era For Policing, said that Link Valley had "more in common with Beirut and Medellín than with the calm, landscaped residential neighborhoods that surround it." Police believed that some apartments were used as crack houses. Cocaine traffickers drove away landlords who tried to board windows or make other improvements to the complexes. One drug establishment used flashlights to manage traffic of people intending to buy drugs. The Police arrested hundreds of people at Link Valley on a yearly basis. Due to overcrowding in Houston jails, many of those caught served shorter sentences than they otherwise would, and many drug dealers arrested by police were replaced by other dealers.

Sergeant J. W. Collins of the Houston Police Department Southwest Patrol Division said that the factor that aggravated the trade was that Link Valley was in close proximity to the 610 Loop. Many drug customers from across Houston traveled to Link Valley to buy drugs. They used the 610 Loop to quickly enter and exit the Link Valley area. A customer would take the Stella Link exit off of 610, then drive down Link Valley Drive and receive his or her drugs. After the drug purchase, the customer would travel to the 610 Loop feeder roads via a side street, and quickly leave Link Valley. Collins said that many of the drug customers were White Americans who were casual drug users, and he recalled that powdered cocaine, rather than crack cocaine, was the main drug purchased at the complex. Collins added that, while many White casual drug consumers would feel nervous entering a black neighborhood, where they would more easily stand out and attract attention of law enforcement and violent criminals, in Link Valley they could easily enter and leave the community, so they felt more confident in buying drugs there. Link Valley was so popular that it frequently drew faraway visitors; some patrol officers said that vehicles with Louisiana license plates frequently appeared at Link Valley.

=== History of criminal activity ===
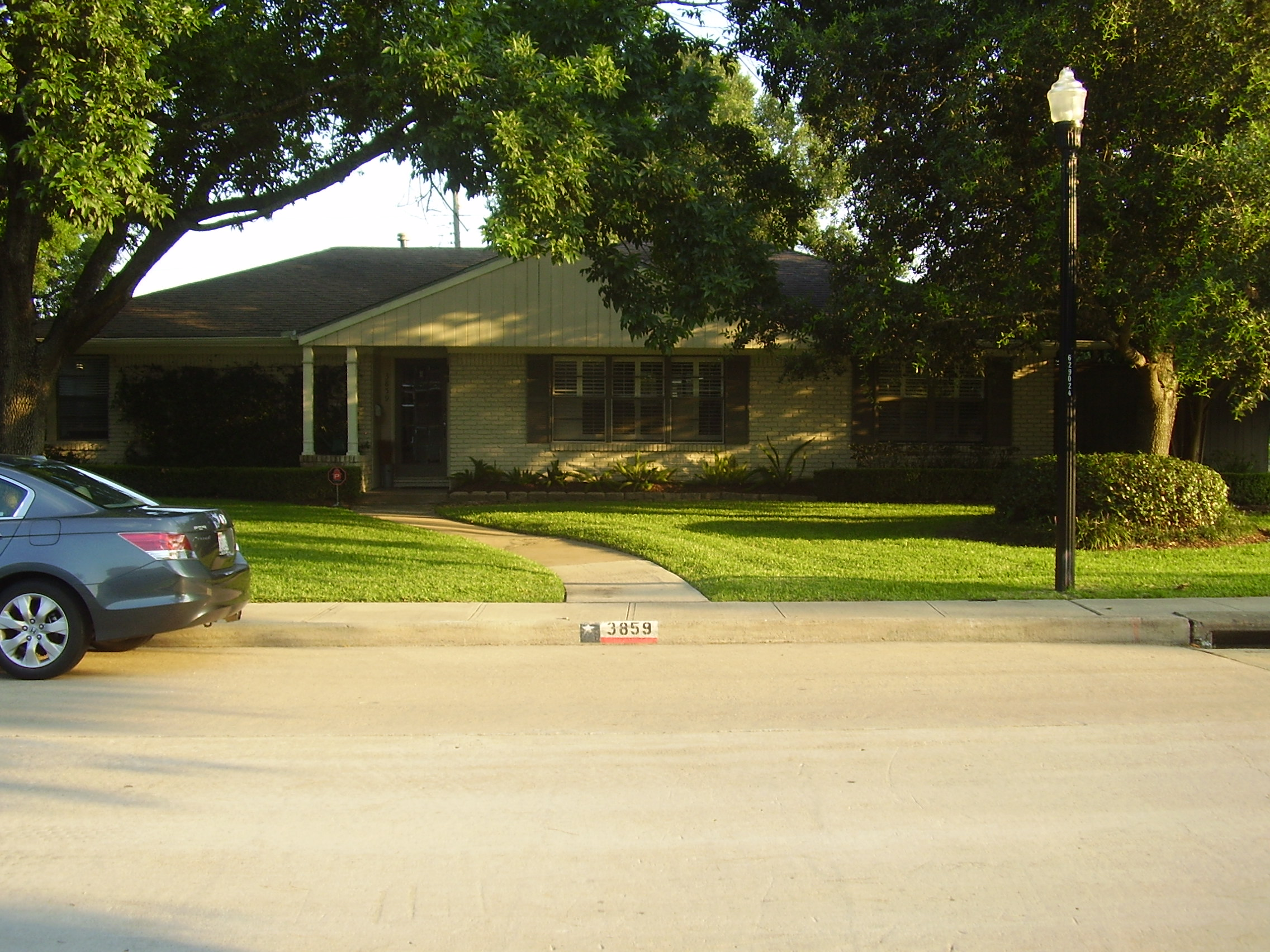
3859 Tartan Lane in Braeswood Place was the site of the murder of Gloria Pastor in 1988, which led to the cleanup of Link Valley.

Collins said that the drug trade appeared in early 1986, spreading from one complex to another within a space of several month. Collins said that, by 1987, his station's officers had visited the complexes on a daily basis. In 1988 the police forces made 200 drug-related arrests in Link Valley. Jeff Kunerth of the Orlando Sentinel said "[w]ith the crime had come a Wild West lawlessness. The utility company stopped replacing street lights because the bulbs were constantly being shot out. Police responding to reports of gunshots, drug deals and dead bodies entered Death Valley with guns drawn." From January 1, 1988, until mid-December 1988, the Houston Police Department received 825 emergency calls, made hundreds of narcotic-related arrests. During the same period, six murders occurred in the complex.

On September 19, 1988, a group of robbers murdered 66-year-old Gloria Pastor in her Braeswood Place house. Police traced the first suspect to an apartment in Link Valley. The suspect, a 15-year-old boy, attempted to sell off some of Pastor's items so he could get money to buy crack cocaine. Police arrested him in Pastor's van. The Pastor murder lead to members of the Braeswood Place community and other nearby communities into putting pressure on the city government, asking for a cleanup of the Link Valley area. Members of civic clubs traced the owners of the apartments and demanded that they begin expelling the drug trade, or else they would face lawsuits. Residents of some neighborhoods north of the South Loop discussed proposals to raise money to buy and tear down apartment complexes.

=== Raid on Link Valley ===
Sergeant J. W. Collins decided that denying the drug dealers usage of abandoned buildings, which were violating city codes and were not safe for human occupancy, would cause the criminal element to leave, so he proposed having them demolished. Originally the City of Houston municipal government agencies did not support his proposal. After the Pastor murder occurred, pressure was placed on the municipal government. The Stella Link Redevelopment Association, a group intending to improve communities across Stella Link Road, had formed. The head of the newly established group, formed by the heads of local civil associations, asked the police officers for help. The police and the neighborhood groups decided to form a partnership. The police department decided that it needed to scare away the customers and to remove the physical deterioration that housed the drug dealers. The Braeswood Place, Knollwood Village, Linkwood, Townhouse Manor, Westridge, Westwood, Willow Meadows, Woodshire and Woodside civic clubs all promoted the crackdown. Rodney Ellis of City Council District D, which represented Link Valley; and Vince Ryan of City Council District C, which represented the subdivisions supporting the crackdown, partnered with the subdivisions.

In January 1989 the police announced that they would be conducting a major sweep of the Link Valley complex. The police did not intend to arrest people, but instead they intended to clear Link Valley of criminal elements so the community could be restored. On January 27, 1989, police officers enacted a thirty-day plan to clean the neighborhood. On the 27th police placed checkpoints and roadblocks, cordoning off Link Valley. One hundred police officers entered the complex to find that, due to the publicity of the upcoming raid, the drug dealers and other criminals had already fled with their weapons and drugs. The raid announcement had evicted drug addicts, drug dealers, vagrants, and vandals. Police discovered cellophane packages that were used to hold crack cocaine. On January 28 of that year, 400 volunteers from surrounding subdivisions picked up trash and cut down weeds that had grown waist-high. The trash included glass tubes, used syringes, and other drug paraphernalia. A trained crew wearing rubber clovers used eighteen dumpsters and two front loaders to clear the debris. The citizens cleared 250 cubic yards (190 m^{3}) of trash, enough to fill ten semi-trailer sized garbage dumpsters. The police cordon, then staffed with fewer officers, remained for the duration of the plan. The cordon ended on March 1, 1989. The police department had spent $90,000 ($230,000 when adjusted for inflation), most of it being overtime pay, on the crackdown on Link Valley.

=== Aftermath of raid and end of widespread crime ===
The largest distribution point of cocaine in the Houston area had been eliminated. Police calls in Link Valley had decreased by 44%. In all of the surrounding neighborhoods, calls for "Part I" crimes, such as arson, assault, automobile theft, burglary, larceny, and murder had decreased. In some communities reports decreased by 12%. Collins believed that, with Link Valley gone, the former customers did not end their drug purchases and instead began buying bulk packages of powdered cocaine from lower profile dealers or began using crack cocaine instead.

In January–May 1988 police had recorded 349 calls to the Link Valley area, while in January–May 1989 they recorded 194 calls, a decrease by 44%.

Collins, the head of the Beechnut Police Station's Tactical Response Team, stated that according to an HPD study of the crime statistics comparing those of January to May 1989 to January to May 1988, after the Link Valley complexes closed, Class 1 and Class 2 crime decreased in Westridge. (Note: Crimes such as aggravated assault, burger, manslaughter, murder, rape, and robbery were classified as Class 1 offenses. Crimes such as assault, embezzlement, forgery, gambling, and narcotics were classified as Class 2 offenses.) In Linkwood Class 1 crime did not change, and Class 2 crime declined by 23%. In Westwood, Class 1 crime decreased by 3 percent and Class 2 crime decreased by 23%.

According to the report, there were decreases of both Class 1 crime and Class 2 crime in neighborhoods surrounding Link Valley. Class 2 crime increased in Woodshire while Class 1 crime decreased; the Woodshire statistic included statistics from Link Valley itself; Collins stated that his sole explanation on why Class 2 crime figures increased was because they occurred as police officers conducted surveillance at Link Valley. In the six-month period in the Woodshire area, Class 1 crimes decreased by 11% and Class 2 crimes increased by 34%. In 1991 Dean E. Murphy of the Los Angeles Times said that "much of the area is still run down, but residents and police remain upbeat; they believe their partnership is working." During that year Don Graff, the co-chairperson of the association, said that rampant drug crime had not occurred in the community since the cleanup. By 2004 the nickname "Death Valley" was no longer used.

== Infrastructure ==
Harris Health System (formerly Harris County Hospital District) designated Martin Luther King Health Center in southeast Houston for ZIP code 77025. The nearest public hospital is Ben Taub General Hospital in the Texas Medical Center.

== Education ==
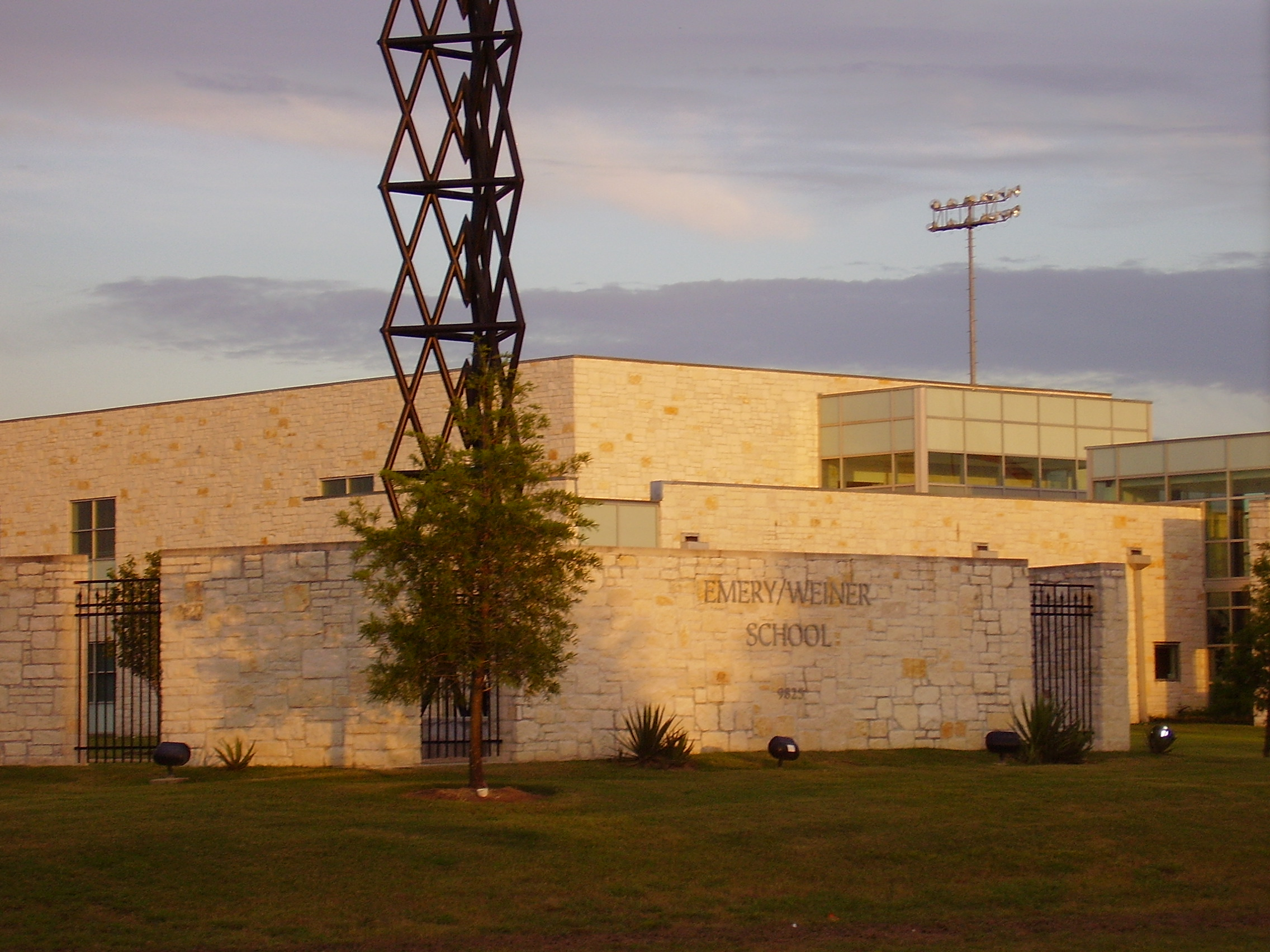
Emery/Weiner School

Residents are zoned to the Houston Independent School District.

Link Valley is zoned to Shearn Elementary School, Pershing Middle School, and Madison High School. Any student zoned to Pershing may apply to Pin Oak Middle School's (of the city of Bellaire) regular program.

The community houses the Emery/Weiner School, a Jewish secondary school. The school had replaced several apartments known for criminal activity.

== See also ==
- Forum Park, Houston
- Gulfton, Houston
