= The Emery/Weiner School =

Jewish day school in Houston, Texas, United States

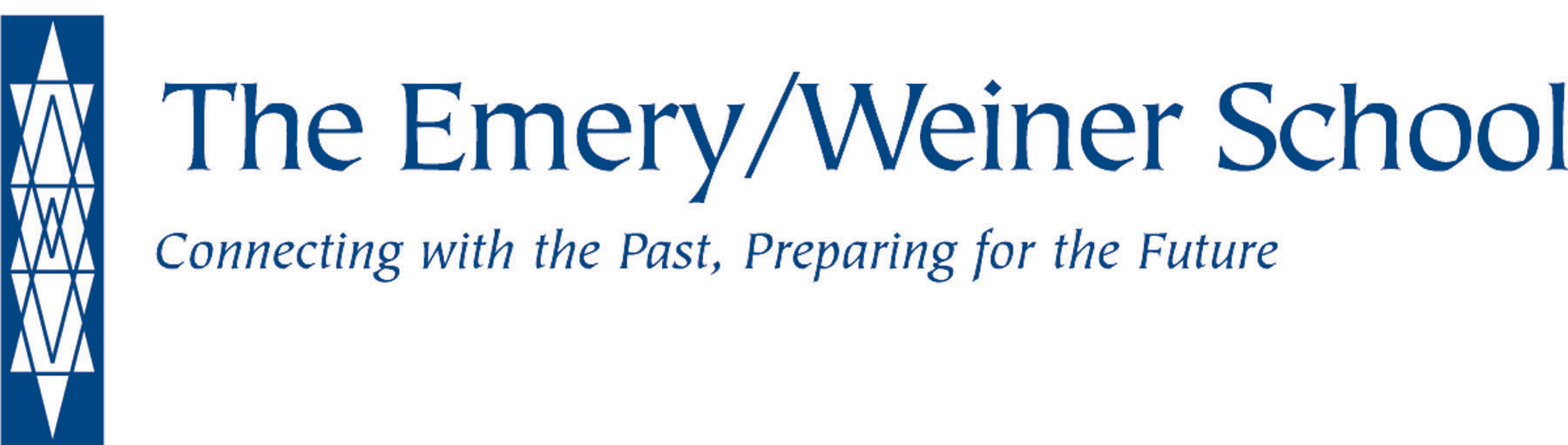

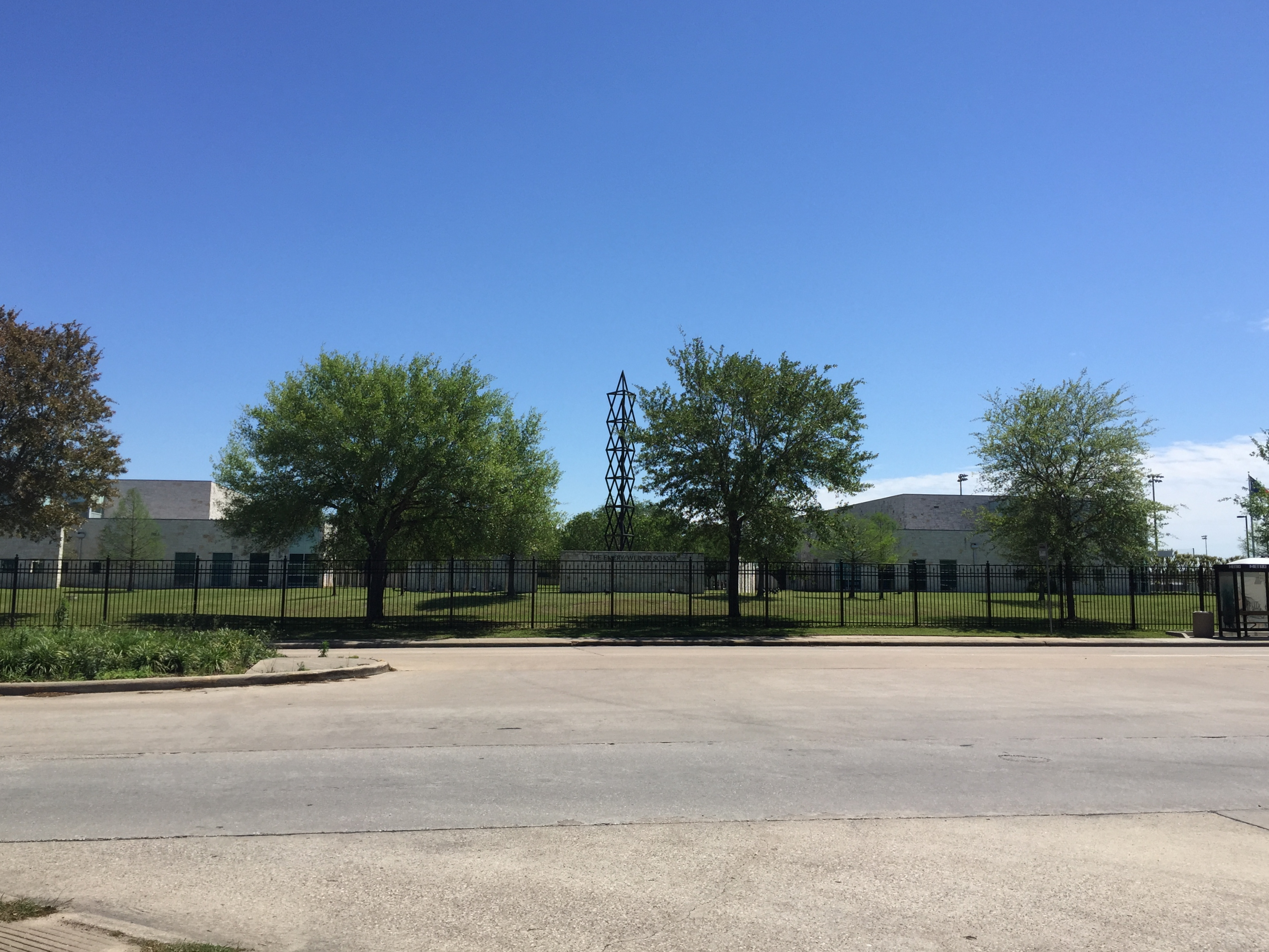

Location
- 9825 Stella Link Road; Houston, Texas; United States
- Coordinates: 29.6752°N 95.4384°W

Information
- Type: Independent
- Religious affiliation: Jewish
- Established: 1978
- Headmaster: Stuart Dow
- Faculty: 68
- Enrollment: 521
- Student to teacher ratio: 8:1
- Campus: Urban
- Colors: Navy and White
- Mascot: Jaguar
- Team name: Jaguars
- Website: emeryweiner.org

The Emery/Weiner School (EWS) is a co-educational, independent Jewish day school in Houston, Texas, United States, serving grades 6-12. The school is accredited by the Independent Schools Association of the Southwest.

The campus is located on 15 acres (61,000 m^{2}) of land, in Link Valley, a community in southwest Houston outside of the 610 Loop, inside Beltway 8, and east of the Westwood subdivision.

The school houses 100,000 square feet (9,000 m^{2}) of classroom space, along with several acres of accessible playing fields. Facilities include art, science, and computer labs, a proscenium theater, art and music studios, a multi-court gymnasium, library, football stadium and turf field, weight room, audio/visual room, a student center/cafeteria and a new makerspace known as the Levine Innovation Lab.

Roselyn Bell, author of the "Houston" entry in The Jewish Traveler: Hadassah Magazine's Guide to the World's Jewish Communities and Sights, wrote around 1987 that the school, then the I. Weiner Jewish Secondary School, had a "centrist" viewpoint in regard to the Jewish religious movements.

== History ==
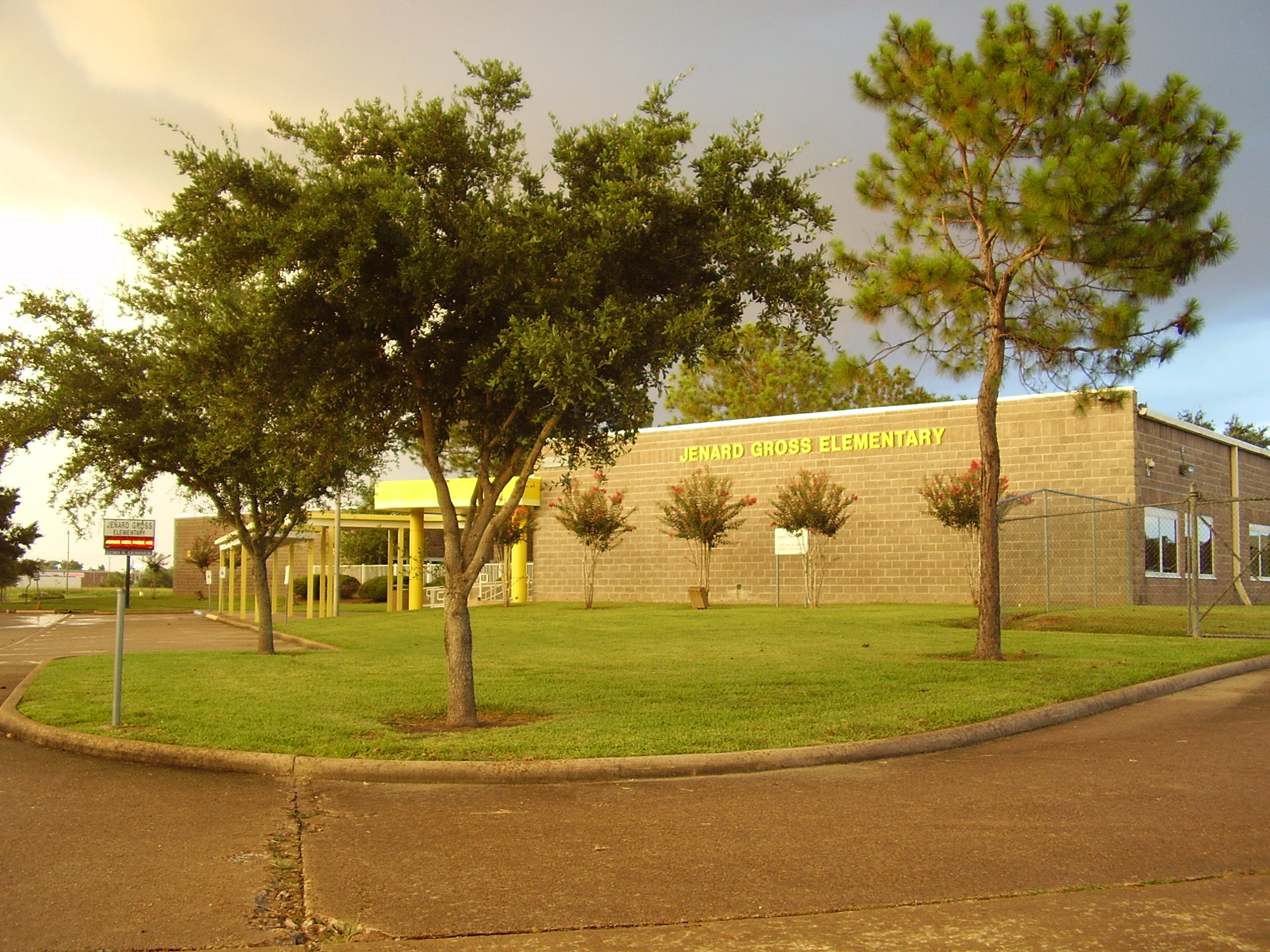
The building that is now (since 2008) used for the Jenard M. Gross Elementary School. (Before 2001, this building had served as the campus of the I. Weiner Jewish Secondary School)

The I. Weiner Jewish Secondary School opened in 1978. The first school year, 1978-79 the school operated out of the educational buildings at Congregation Brith Shalom, and the athletic facilities of the Jewish Community Center. The first campus the school owned was located at 12583 South Gessner Road in what is now the Brays Oaks district. I. Weiner moved to 9825 Stella Link Road in 2000 and the Houston Independent School District acquired the former campus; as of 2008 the former campus is Gross Elementary School. Emery High School opened in 2001, and so the campus became collectively known as The Emery/Weiner School. The current campus had replaced some apartment complexes known for criminal activity.

The first students graduated from Emery/Weiner in 2005. In 2008, EWS embarked on a 10.5 million dollar "Expanding Horizons" campaign to expand its facilities and endowment. The expansion included a new Upper School wing, athletics pavilion, and fine arts complex. The school houses a 500-seat theater-style auditorium, two gymnasiums, and a computer center.

Mottos from the school have included Connecting with the Past, Preparing for the Future (2000–2010) (2011–Present), "A Decade of Difference" (2010–2011), and "Experience the Difference..." (2011–present). The Emery-Weiner school hosts clubs and after-school programs, including Tikkun Olam and after-school tutoring.

Emery/Weiner school also offers sports including lacrosse, football, baseball, cross country, volleyball, track, tennis, and golf. The tennis team has won a handful of state titles, competing in the boys and girls state championship tournament almost every year. The Football team won its first TAAPS state championship in 2015, while the baseball team won its first state championship in 2017.

== Experiential education ==
Middle schoolers at Emery attend a few weekend-long campsite trips devoted to the building of camaraderie between peers. Aside from that, 6th graders take a local camping trip. 7th graders travel to Galveston, Texas, learning about the ecosystem as well as immigration through Galveston Bay. The 8th class embark on a trip to Washington, D.C., learning about the history of the United States as well as the U.S. government.

Emery High School has three main periods of experiential education. The first are weekend trips to campsites within the first month of school. In the winter, each grade takes another trip to a campsite, focusing on exploration and team-building. Freshman travel to Big Bend National Park, and hike 7,825 feet to the summit of Emery Peak. Seniors, during this time, begin "comparative religions week," where they travel the city deepening their understanding of religions other than Judaism. The third period of experiential education is spring trips. Freshmen take a trip throughout the deep south, focusing their learning on the Civil Rights Movement in America. Sophomores travel to San Francisco, with a focus on innovation and inclusion. Juniors travel to New York City, taking in all the complexities of the largest city in the U.S. During spring trips, seniors go through "Internship week," where each senior is required to find an internship.

== Notable alumni ==
- Abbie Kamin (2005), Houston City Council member, District C
- Peter Berry (2020), University of Alabama wheelchair basketball player
- Noah Pacht (2020), Actor (Broadway - The Outsiders, John Proctor Is the Villain - and film - Anything's Possible)

== See also ==
- History of the Jews in Houston
