= Braeswood Place, Houston =

Group of subdivisions in Harris County, Texas, United States

Coordinates: 29.695°N 95.430°W

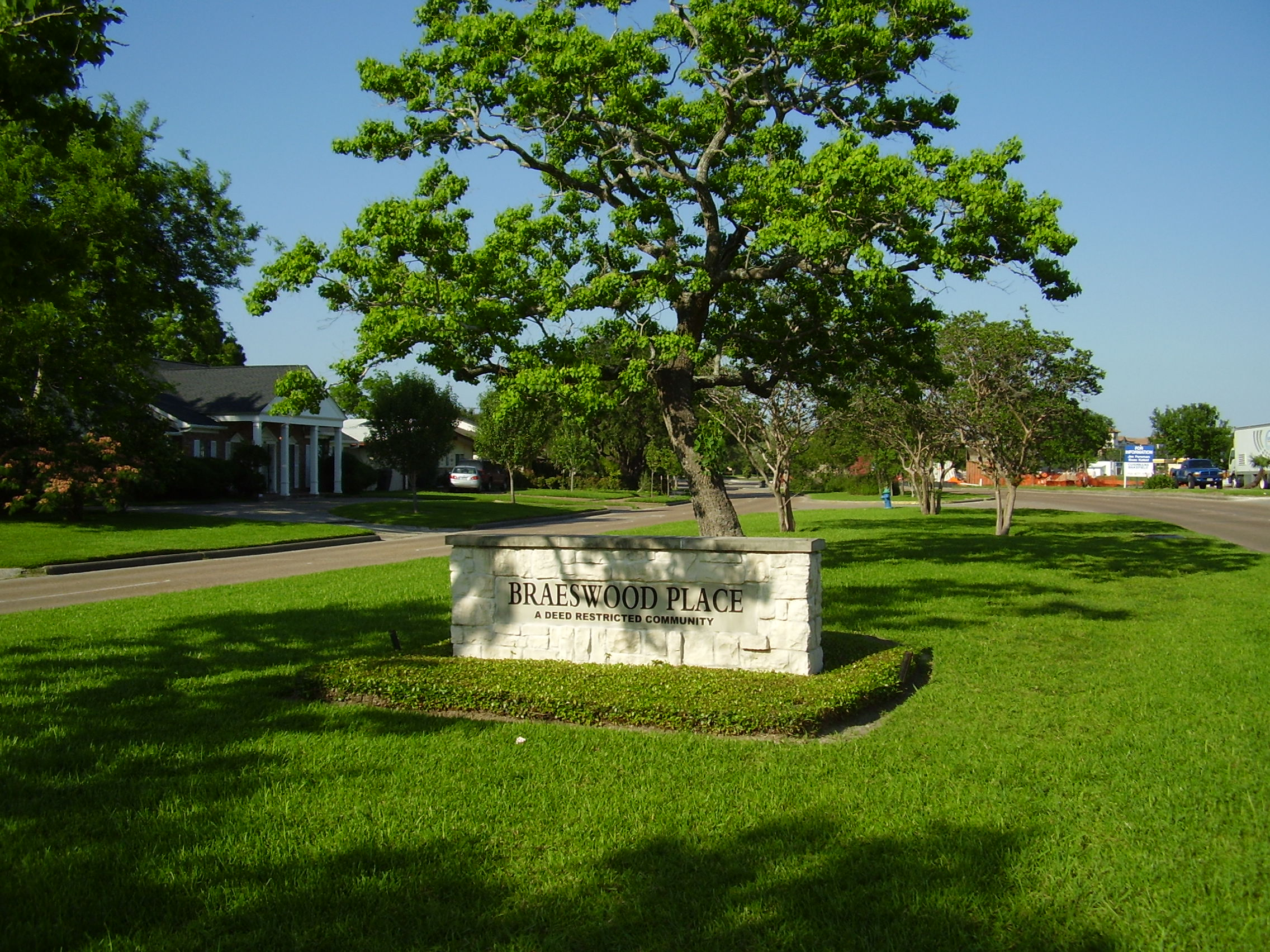
A sign marking Braeswood Place

Braeswood Place is a group of subdivisions in Harris County, Texas, United States. The vast majority of the land is in Houston while a small part is in Southside Place.

Braeswood Place is a mainly single-family neighborhood inside the 610 Loop, east of the city of Bellaire, south of the cities of Southside Place and West University Place, west of the Texas Medical Center and the neighborhood of Old Braeswood, and north of the neighborhoods of Linkwood and Knollwood Village. Braeswood Place consists of approximately 2,200 homes and includes seven subdivisions: Ayrshire, Braes Heights, Braes Oaks, Braes Manor, Braes Terrace, Emerald Forest, and Southern Oaks.

== History ==
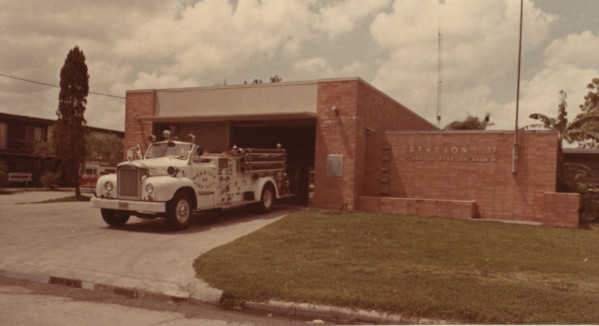
Fire Station 37, 1976

The Braeswood Place Homeowners Association was charted in 1951.

On September 19, 1988, a group of robbers murdered 66-year-old Gloria Pastor in her Braeswood Place house. Police traced the first suspect to an apartment in the Link Valley area, less than 2 miles (3.2 km) away. The apartments were nicknamed "Death Valley" due to drug-related crime. The Pastor murder led to members of the Braeswood Place community and other nearby communities into putting pressure on the city government, asking for a cleanup of the Link Valley area. As a result, police evicted criminal elements from Link Valley in a 1989 raid.

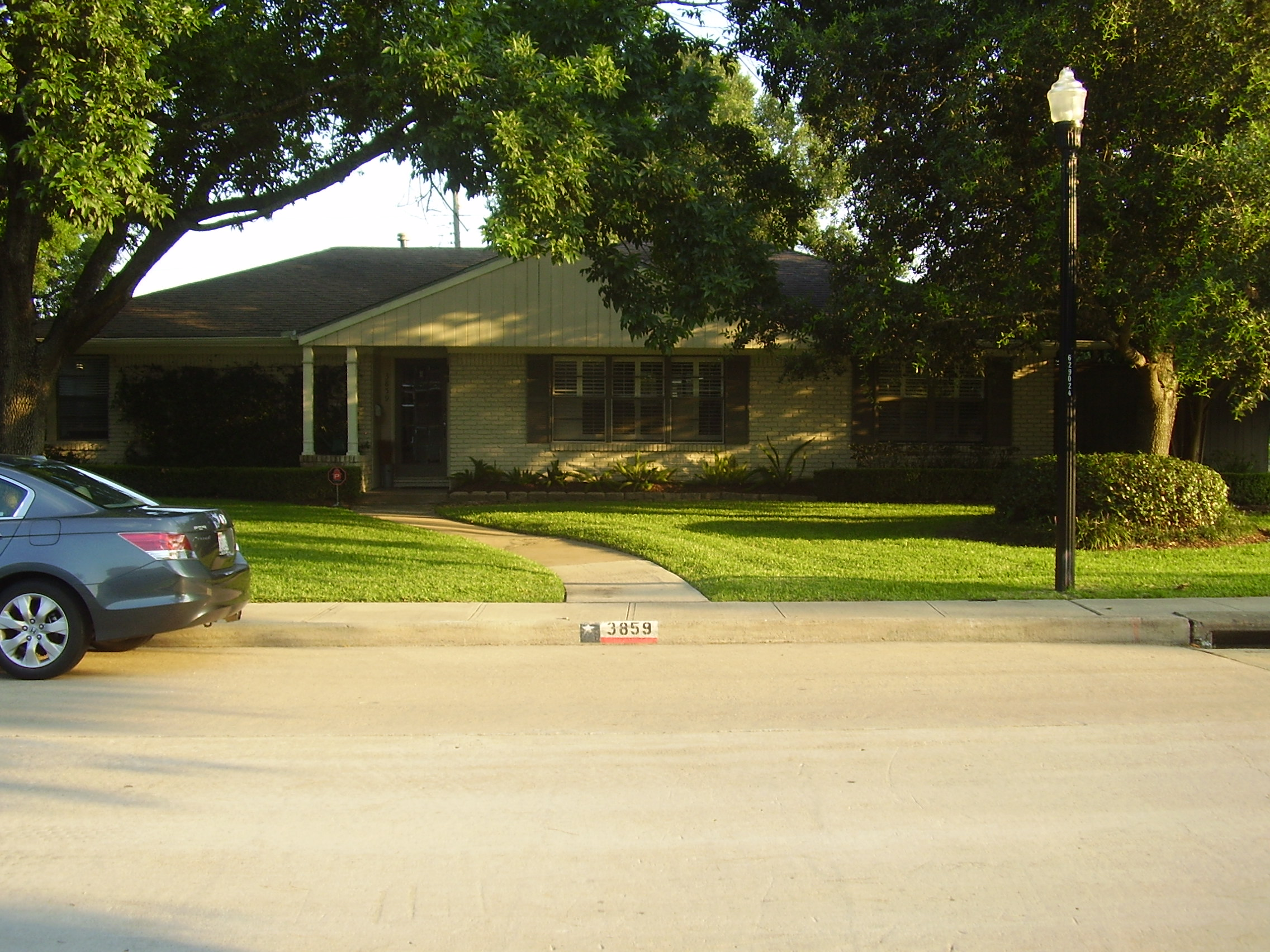
3859 Tartan Lane, the site of the murder of Gloria Pastor in 1988, which led to the cleanup of Link Valley

In the 1990s a group of community-minded residents spearheaded the effort to purchase dilapidated apartments and commercial businesses in a four-block area. The Stella Link Redevelopment Association (SLRA) emerged from the early efforts and further organized the fund-raising endeavors. SLRA was successful in its attempts and the apartments and commercial buildings were purchased and torn down. New deed restrictions were put into place, two streets were closed and the area was developed into a neighborhood asset. SLRA created a master plan for the area and worked with the City of Houston and other independent entities to turn the once-blighted blocks into a landscaped backdrop for several community activities. The facilities now located on the $42 million Stella Link Park community service corridor site include the neighborhood library, the Weekley YMCA, and the national headquarters for The Sheltering Arms senior citizens facility.

The neighborhood was deeply impacted by Tropical Storm Allison in 2001 which flooded about 500 of the community's 2,200 houses, which amounts to about 20% of the houses. Before Allison, the neighborhood had been in a slow transition from mostly 1950s style ranch homes to two-story Colonial, Tudor, and Stucco houses. With the razing of many houses flooded by Allison, the transition pace quickly accelerated. Many upper-middle-class families moved into the newly built houses.

In 2004 Anjali Athavalley of the Houston Chronicle said "Established areas like Braes Heights, Braes Terrace and Weslayan Plaza have performed solidly over the past five years. But real estate agents say the chances of finding a bargain in those areas are slim." In 2008 the Houston Press named the Stella Link Road area by Pershing Middle School as the "best hidden neighborhood."

== Cityscape ==
Braeswood Place consists of approximately 2,200 homes and includes seven subdivisions: Ayrshire, Braes Heights, Braes Oaks, Braes Manor, Braes Terrace, Emerald Forest, and Southern Oaks. The community is in proximity to the Texas Medical Center and Rice Village.

=== Braes Heights ===
Braes Heights, located west of Buffalo Speedway, consists of 13 sections, numbered 1 through 13. Blocks 1 and 2 of Section 1 are in the City of Southside Place.

As of 1995 Braes Heights has 896 houses. Katherine Feser of the Houston Chronicle said that Braes Heights had "a broader range of properties" than Southern Oaks.

Braes Heights was developed from 1947 to 1952. The original houses were ranch style houses. By April 23, 1995, over 100 newer houses had been built, mostly in the northern part of Braes Heights. In 1995, the original houses had a price rage from $130,000 ($274677.88 in current money) to $250,000 ($528226.69 in current money), while the "tear-downs" (houses to be purchased and demolished so new construction can be built) were priced from $90,000 ($190161.61 in current money) to $135,000 ($285242.41 in current money) and newer houses were priced from $275,000 ($581049.36 in current money) to $450,000 ($950808.04 in current money). In 2000 Feser said that in terms of all of the subdivisions in Braeswood Place, most of the demolition older houses occurred in Braes Heights. By 2000 120 new houses had been constructed in Braeswood Place. In Braeswood Place, a lot described by Feser as being in a "prime corner" would have a price from $190,000 ($355217.39 in current money) to $210,000 ($392608.7 in current money) while an interior lot would have a price from $175,000 ($327173.91 in current money) to $180,000 ($336521.74 in current money). By 2013 many of the original houses were being demolished and replaced with stucco and brick two-story houses.

A real estate agent quoted in a 2013 Houstonia article, Linda Marshall, stated that the lots are larger in Braes Heights than in West University Place, and that the prices are 30% lower in Braes Heights than in West University.

=== Braes Oaks ===
Braes Oaks has three sections, 1, 1A, and 2. Braes Oaks has lots that are larger than average and many trees that provide shade. As of 2002 Braes Oaks has 131 houses. The original houses consisted of ranch-style houses. Most o the newer houses were two story pier and beam foundation houses. The newer houses were priced around $630,000 ($1127705.83 in current money) around 2002. The houses range in size from 3,800 square feet (350 m^{2}) to 4,000 square feet (370 m^{2}). After Tropical Storm Allison, which flooded several Braes Oaks houses, some homeowners decided to tear down their houses, while others decided to rebuild. Katherine Feser of the Houston Chronicle said that the central location of Braes Oaks, the trees, and the large lots made Braes Oaks "prime".

=== Southern Oaks ===
Southern Oaks has two sections, numbered 1 and 2. In Southern Oaks, lot sizes tend to be 10-15% larger than in other subdivisions in Braeswood Place. Southern Oaks has 248 houses. The original houses were built in the 1950s. Most houses are located on dead-end streets and had two car garages. Many featured built-in fireplaces, large bedrooms, closets small by standards in the year 2000, hardwood floors, and 1950s-style glass doorknobs. In 2000 most homeowners decided to restore their older houses instead of tearing them down. Usually restorations involved adding master bedroom and bath suites and adding kitchens with finishes and luxury appliances. In 2000 Steve Anton, a real estate broker of Hallmark Properties, said that a general trend of increasing lot prices and the addition of expensive houses in the wider area increased the prices of Southern Oaks real estate values. The prices of Southern Oaks houses in good condition ranged from $190,000 ($355217.39 in current money) to $300,000 ($560869.57 in current money). The price per square foot ranged from $100 ($186.96 in current money) to $140 ($261.74 in current money). Homeowners in Southern Oaks are required to buy flood insurance.

== Demographics ==
In 2015, the City of Houston-defined Braeswood (Place) Super Neighborhood had 21,835 residents. 61% were non-Hispanic white, 15% were non-Hispanic Asians, 12% were Hispanics, 10% were non-Hispanic blacks, and 2% were non-Hispanic others. In 2000 the super neighborhood had 18,797 residents. 68% were non-Hispanic white, 12% were non-Hispanic Asians, 11% were Hispanics, 7% were non-Hispanic blacks, and 2% were non-Hispanic others.

=== Local government ===
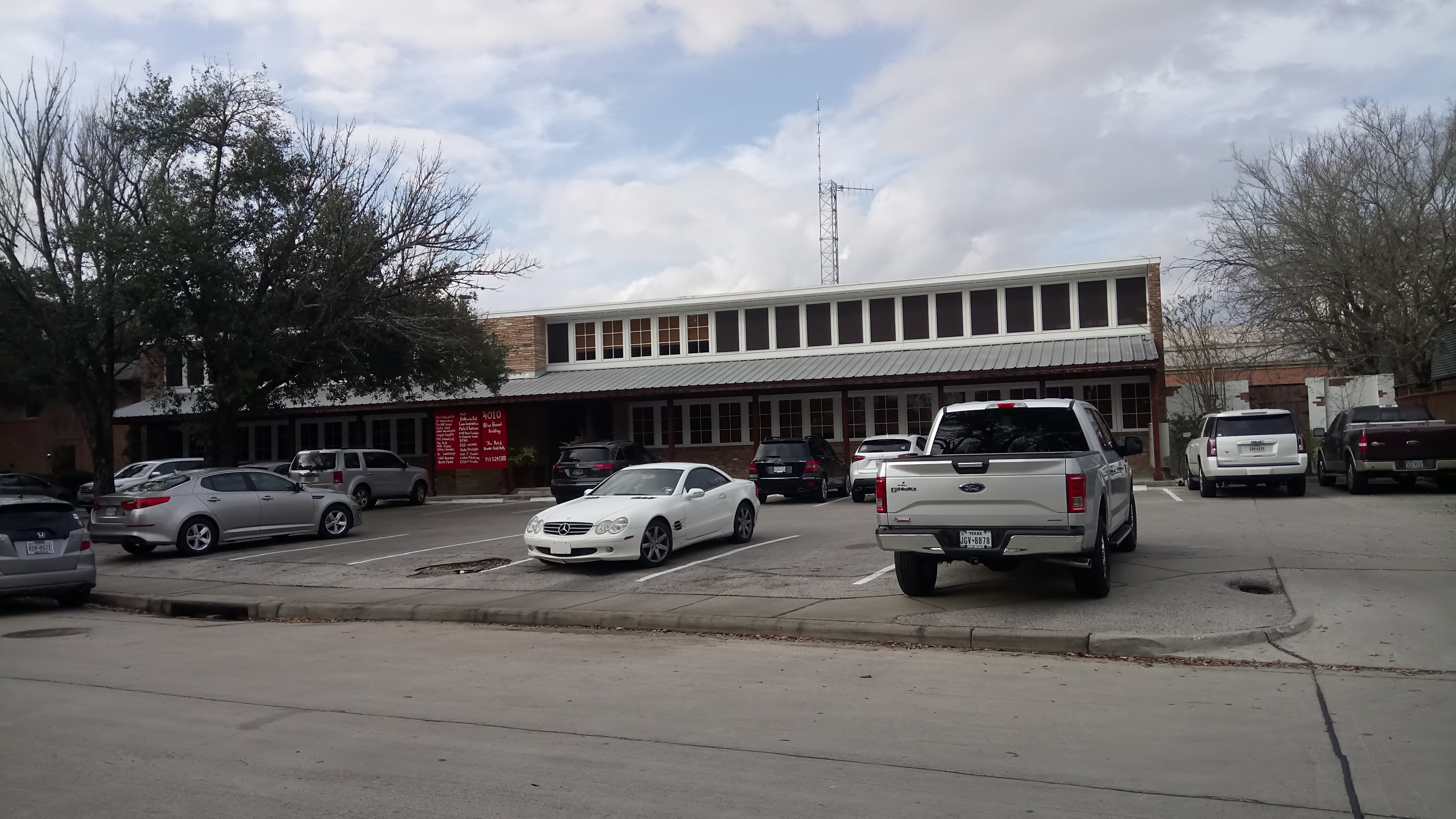
The headquarters of the Braeswood Place Homeowner's Association (BPHA)

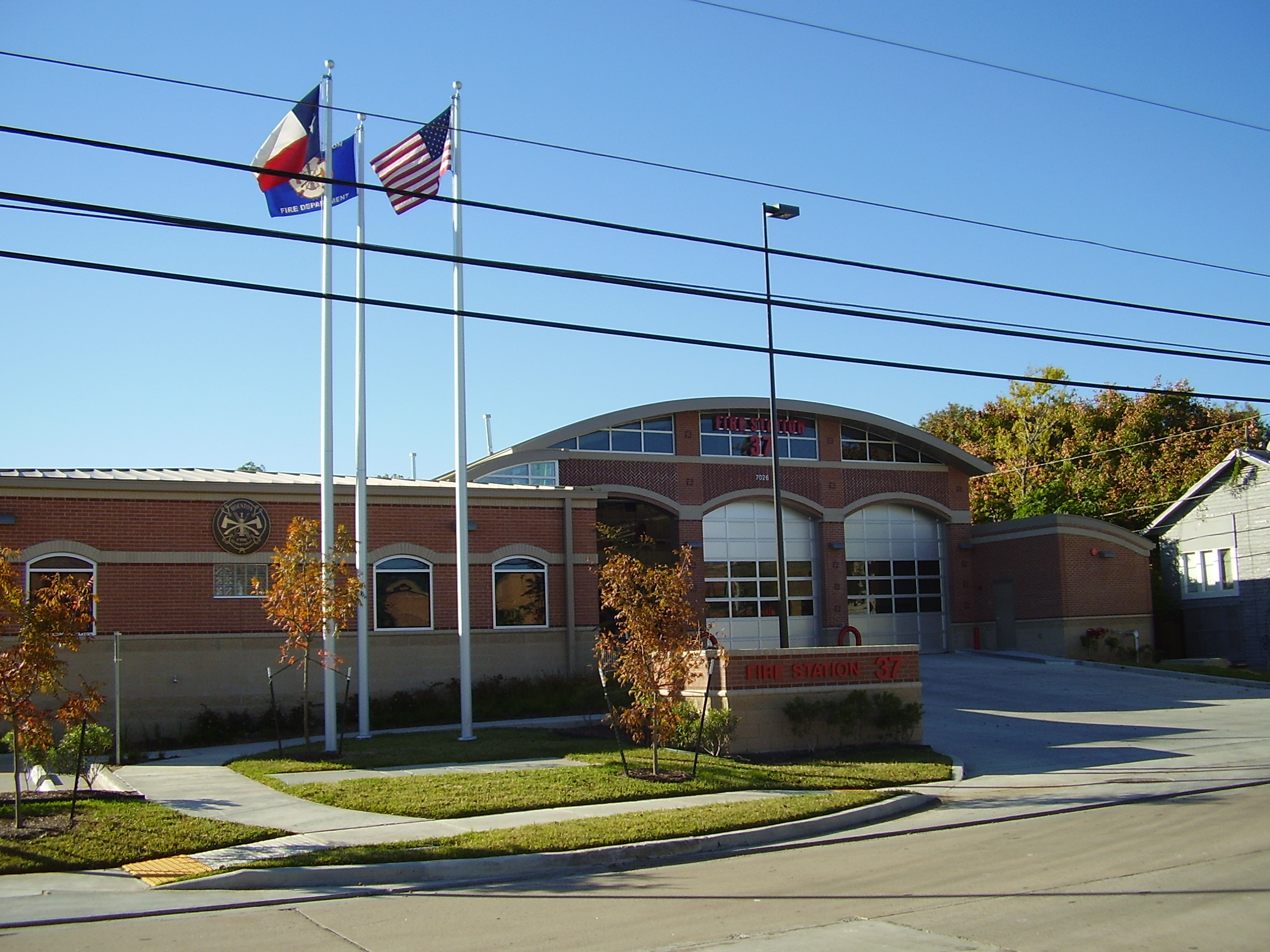
Fire Station 37

The homeowners association, Braeswood Place Homeowner's Association (BPHA), is headquartered in Suite #112 at 4010 Blue Bonnet Boulevard. The association has six officers, with each serving one or two years, and twelve area directors, each serving three years. A nominating committee selects candidates and members of the homeowners association cast ballots to elect the members. Area directors select "block captains" for each block. A block captain delivers the Sentinel, the homeowner's association newsletter, and communicate with area residents.

Most of Braeswood Place is in the Houston City Council District C, while a portion south of the Brays Bayou is in District K.

Houston Fire Station #37 Braes Heights of the Houston Fire Department, at 7026 Stella Link, is in Fire District 21. The original Station 37, located on developer-donated land at 3828 Aberdeen Way, in a residential area, opened in 1955. The current Station 37 building, on the new site, opened on September 24, 2009. The grand opening ceremony for the station was held at 11 AM on October 16, 2009. The station features artwork at the main entrance and at the rear door. The front door "stained glass look" artwork resembles a water hose spraying water, and the back door artwork portrays a squirrel in an outdoor environment. The back door artwork ties into a story of firefighters at the original Station 37 feeding a "station" squirrel.

The neighborhood is within the Houston Police Department's Southwest Patrol Division, headquartered at 13097 Nitida.

=== County, state, and federal representation ===
Harris County Precinct One, headed by Commissioner Rodney Ellis, serves Braeswood Place. Patrol services are privately contracted to the Harris County Precinct 1 Constable's Office.

Braeswood Place is located in District 134 of the Texas House of Representatives and represented by Ann Johnson. Braeswood Place is within District 17 of the Texas Senate. Braeswood Place is within Texas's 7th congressional district. As of 2018, the representative is Lizzie Fletcher.

Metropolitan Transit Authority of Harris County, Texas (METRO) operates bus services in Braeswood Place. Bus routes 2 Bellaire, 4 Beechnut, 8 South Main, and 68 Brays Bayou Crosstown serve the community.

Harris Health System (formerly Harris County Hospital District) designated Martin Luther King Health Center in southeast Houston for ZIP code 77025. The nearest public hospital is Ben Taub General Hospital in the Texas Medical Center.

== Parks and recreation ==
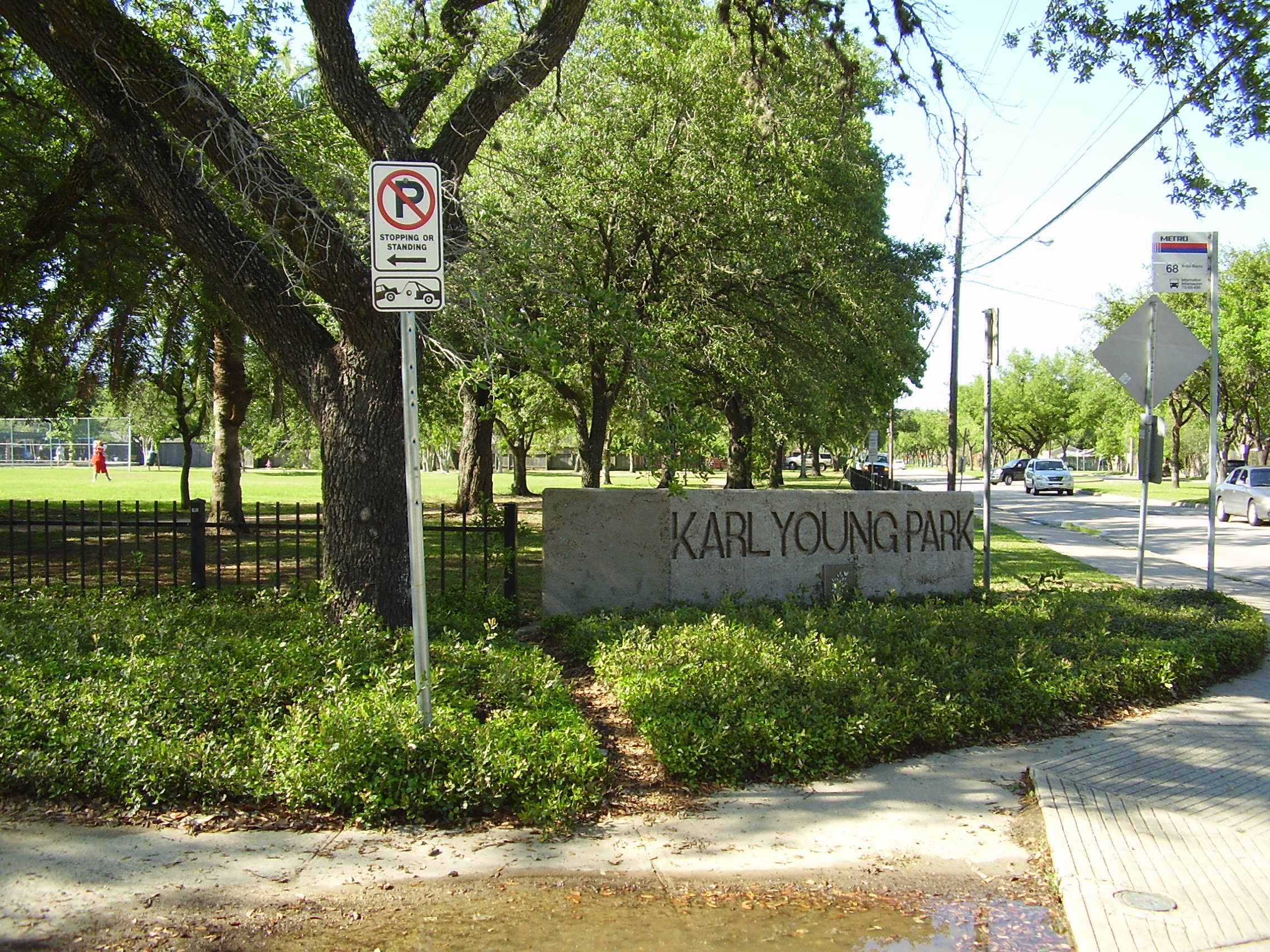
Karl Young Park

Karl Young Park, a park operated by the City of Houston, is located in the community. It includes three full court basketball courts, three half court basketball courts, a 60-foot (18 m) baseball field, a full court tennis court, a trail system, two playgrounds, and a picnic pavilion. The park is slightly less than 5 acres (2.0 ha) in size. It was named after Karl Young, a Houstonian who was killed when an oil field exploded. In the 1990s a woman named Judy Siverson, a community service volunteer in Houston City Council District C, and her neighbors raised $300,000 to improve Young Park.

Helen's Park, named after Helen Dallerup Williams, was dedicated in October 2000. Williams was the wife of Myron Williams, a man who died in 1990. In his will Myron Williams stated that his remaining funds would be used to build a park with a fountain "of outstanding beauty, composed of lovely colors." The Myron Williams Trust maintains the park.

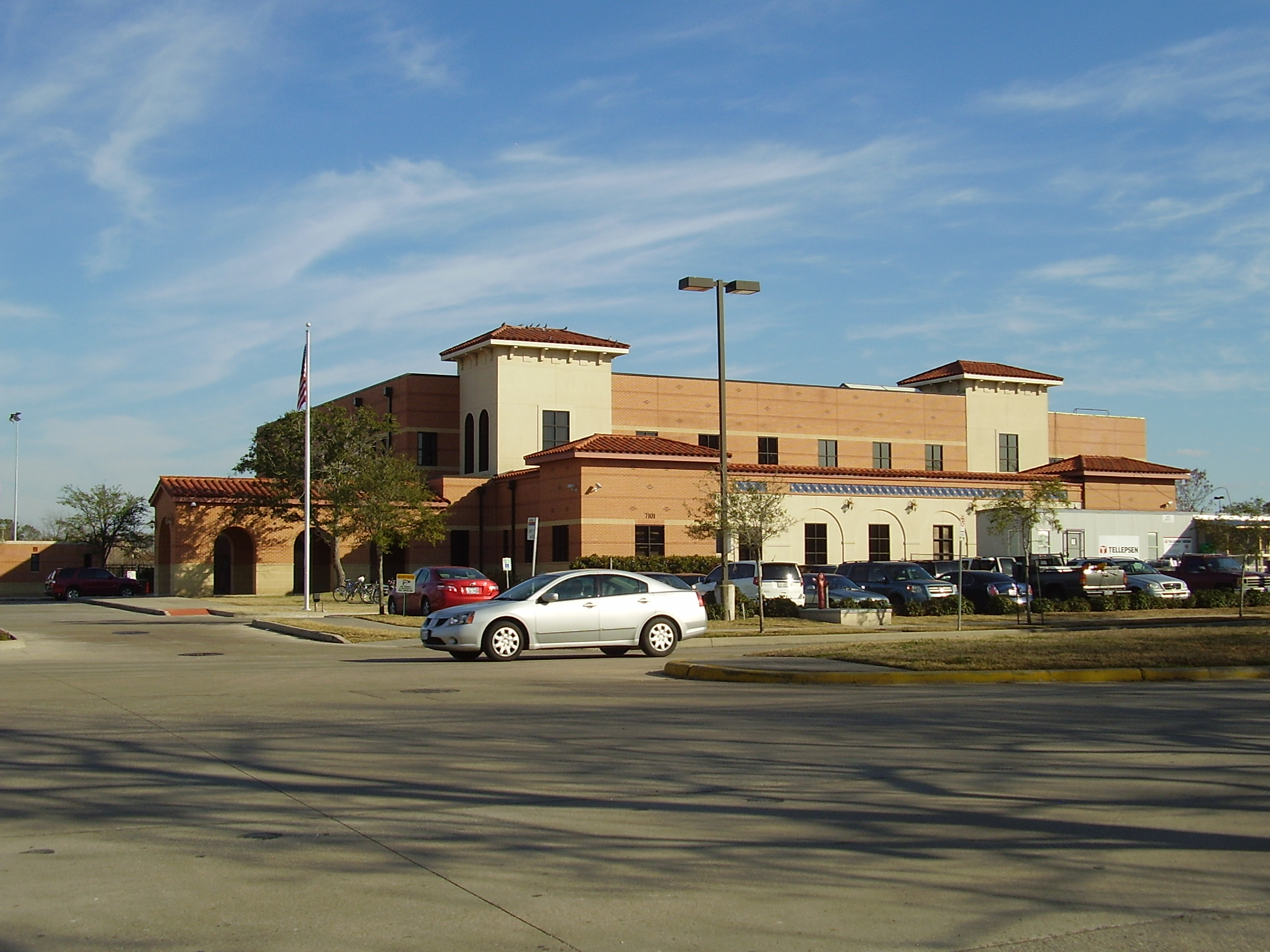
The Weekley Family YMCA

The John P. McGovern Campus Park is located along Underwood Street. The site of the 20-acre (8.1 ha) park previously included apartment complexes known for criminal activity. Stella Link Park also is in the community. The park, a part of a $42 million project, houses Sheltering Arms, a senior services facility built for $9 million. The center opened on Saturday July 21, 2001, with 60 employees.

The community houses the Weekley Family YMCA, which replaced the previous Southwest Branch YMCA in West University Place. The groundbreaking of the original $3.5 million facility occurred in September 2001. It houses office spaces, a gymnasium, an outdoor pool, an outdoor field, and a weight room. The Southwest YMCA opened in 1951.

Linkwood Park and Community Center is in Braes Manor Section 1.

Members of the community place their children in the West University Little League (of the city of West University Place). Originally the community had its own little league team called the "Braes Bayou Little League." The team was merged into the West University Little League in 2005 ; players of the Braes Bayou Little League living in the ZIP codes of 77035 and 77096 were redirected to the Westbury Little League.

== Economy ==
Many of the businesses serving area residents are along West Holcombe Boulevard.

The Braes Heights Shopping Center, a two-story, mid-century modern shopping center, is located in the nearby City of Southside Place. In 2012 the Houston Press ranked the center the "Best Strip Mall - 2012" due to its abundance of small businesses that made the editors feel nostalgic. The editors said "In many ways, Braes Heights seems more like Rice Village than Rice Village" because many iconic small businesses had left Rice Village by 2012. Vanderbilt Square, a shopping center located in a nearby area in Houston, had been built by 1995. A Randall's Food Markets store and a Barnes & Noble bookshop anchor the center.

Cheryl P. Rose of the Houston Chronicle stated in 2013 that the proximities to Downtown and the TMC are "appealing" to residents who work in those areas.

== Education ==
=== Public schools ===
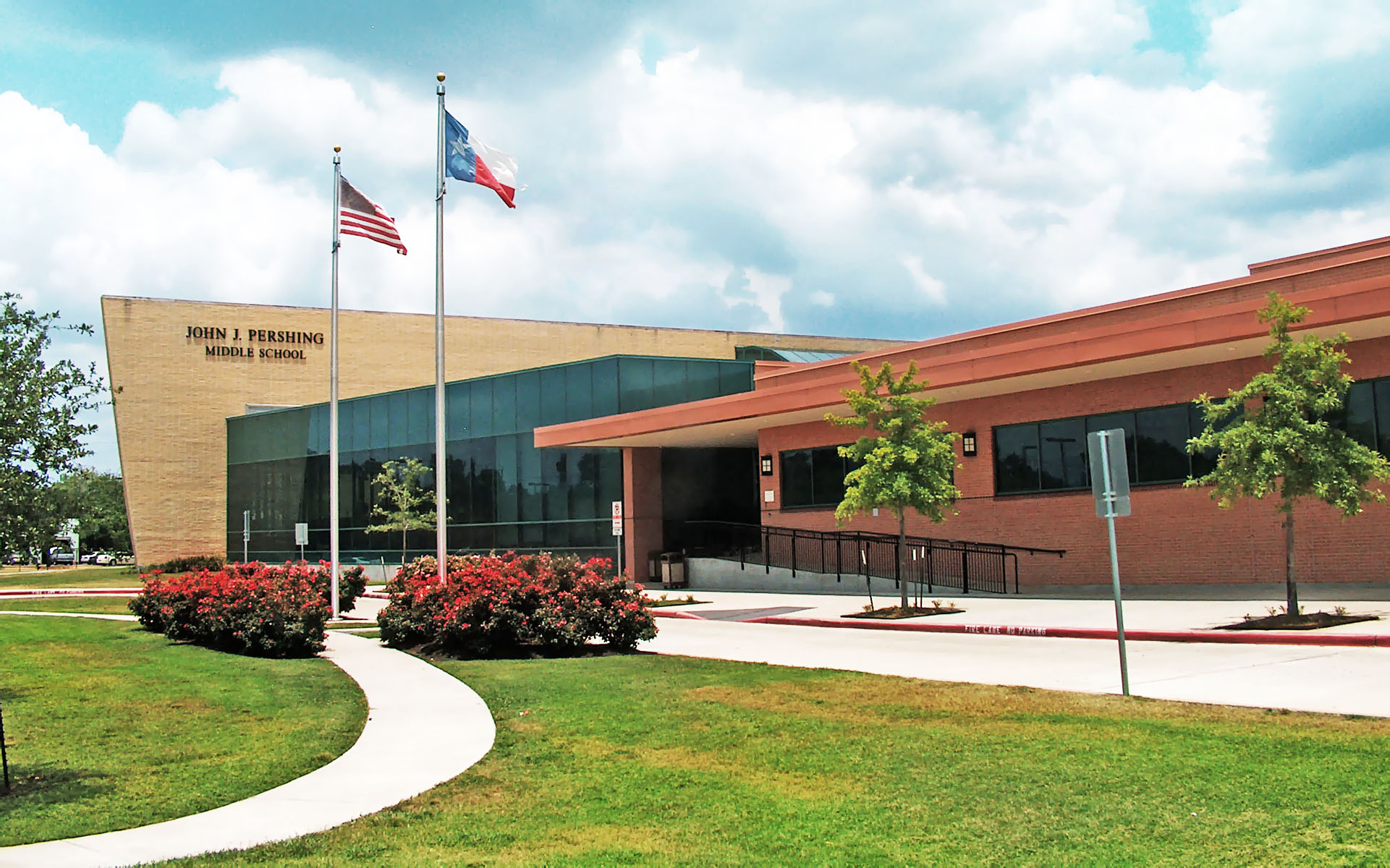
Pershing Middle School

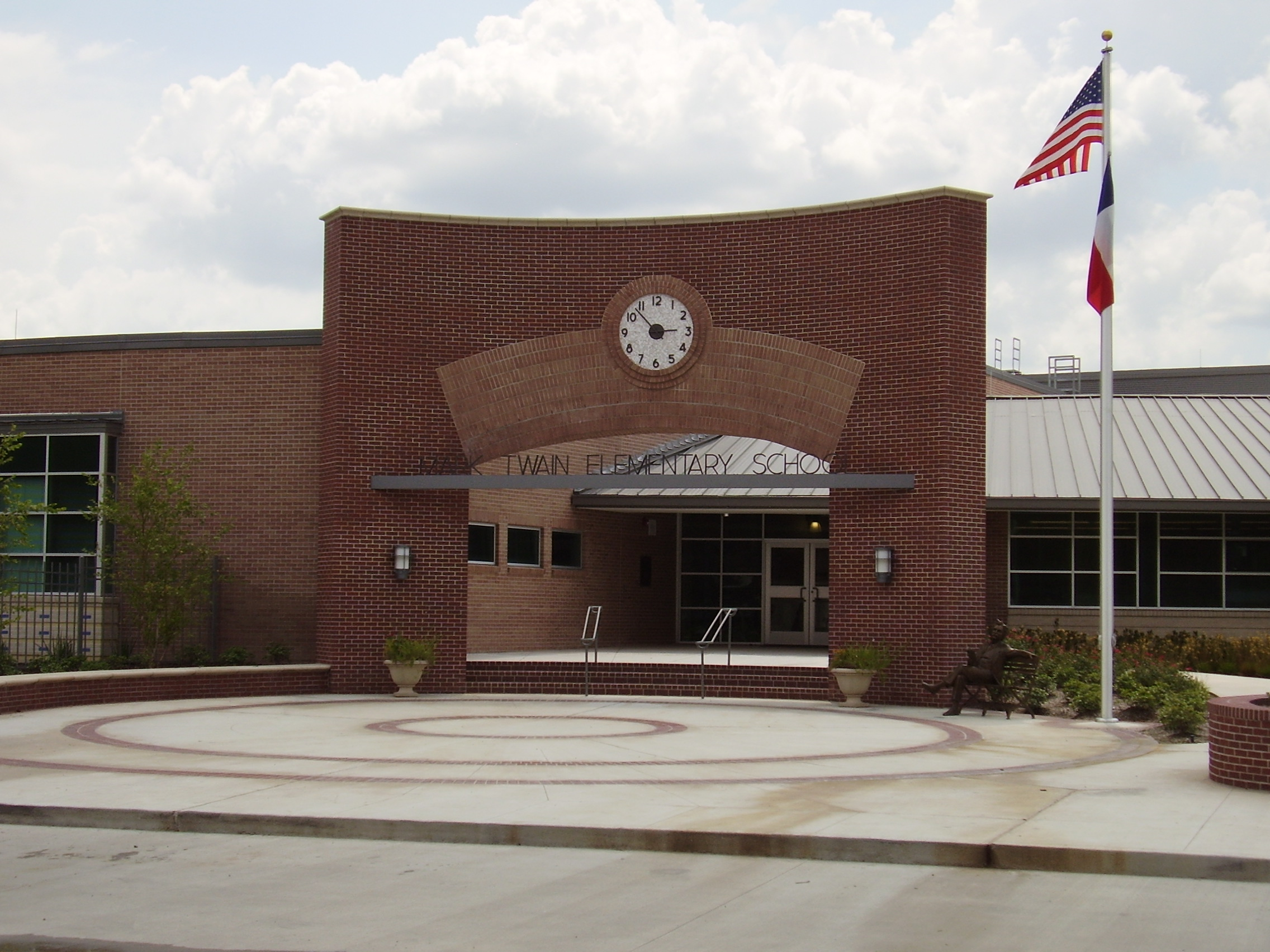
Mark Twain Elementary School

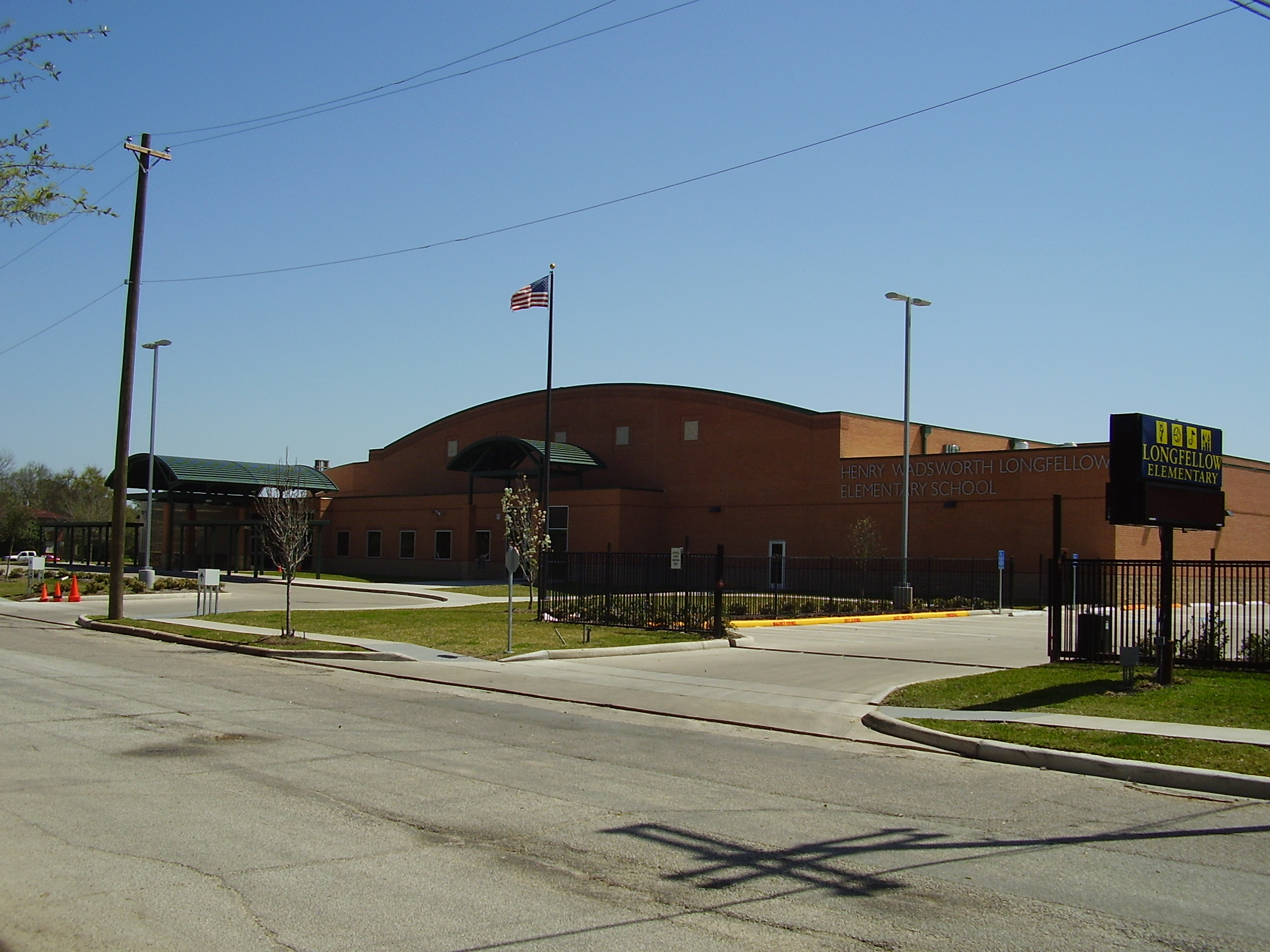
Henry Wadsworth Longfellow Elementary School in Braes Manor

Braeswood Place is within the Houston Independent School District (HISD).

Next door to McGovern Park are two HISD schools, Mark Twain Elementary School and John J. Pershing Middle School. The original Mark Twain campus, which was built in the 1950s, was demolished to make way for a new campus in 2006. The original Pershing Middle School campus was also demolished, replaced with a new campus that opened in January 2007.

Parts of Braeswood Place north of the Brays Bayou (including Braes Heights, Braes Oaks, and Ayrshire) are zoned to Twain Elementary. Parts south of the bayou (including Braes Manor and Braes Terrace) are zoned to Longfellow Elementary. Longfellow is in Braes Manor Section 1. All parts of Braeswood Place are zoned to Pershing Middle. Any student zoned to Pershing may apply to Pin Oak Middle School's (of the city of Bellaire) regular program.

Pupils east of Stella Link (including Braes Heights, Braes Oaks) are zoned to Lamar High School in the Upper Kirby district of Houston while students west of Stella Link or south of Brays Bayou (including Ayrshire and Braes Terrace) are zoned to Bellaire High School in the city of Bellaire.

The Rice School, a magnet public school, is located just east of Braeswood Place.

==== History of schools ====
The original campus of Twain was a red brick building. Originally Twain's magnet program was focused on after-school programs. In the 1980s parents in the area considered Twain to be an undesirable school. In 1986 a group of parents at Bethany United Methodist Weekday School decided to organize the group Friends of Mark Twain to call for an improvement in Twain and lobbied on its behalf. The school's reputation improved and, according to former principal Joyce Dauber, by 1996 75% of the parents of students lived in the school's neighborhood.

In 1995 Jim Ainsworth, a resident quoted in the Houston Chronicle, said "There's been a real resurgence in the schools. The biggest problem that we found was perception because of a lack of a peer group for both kids and parents. That has changed a lot and is continuing to change as more kids go to the school." In 2013 Houstonia stated that "Parents, in particular, praise the area’s schools" including Twain and Pershing.

By 2004 the original Twain building was razed. Students at Twain were put in temporary buildings while a new school building, financed by the 2002 Rebuild Houston school bond program, was under construction. Its cost was $14 million and it was scheduled to open in 2005.

=== Private schools ===
St. Vincent de Paul School, a K-8 Roman Catholic school operated by the Roman Catholic Archdiocese of Galveston-Houston, is in the area.

St. Mark's Episcopal School in the city of West University Place is also nearby.

=== Public libraries ===
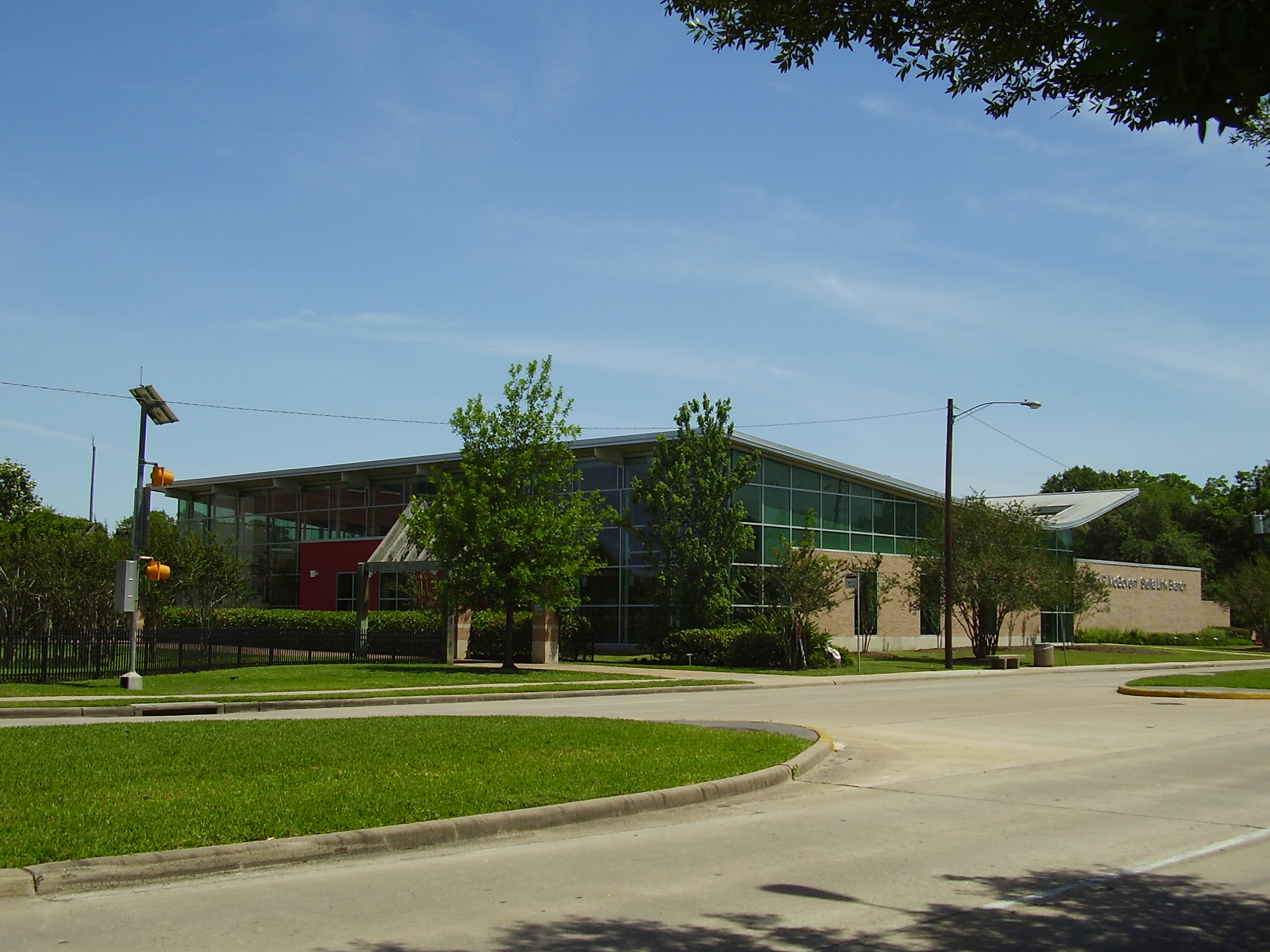
The John P. McGovern-Stella Link Branch of the Houston Public Library

The McGovern-Stella Link Branch of the Houston Public Library is located at 7405 Stella Link Road. The library, named after physician John P. McGovern, opened on January 8, 2005. The Houston Business Journal awarded the library a Landmark Award for Community Impact in 2006. In 2007 and 2010 the Houston Press ranked the branch the "Best Public Library Branch." The McGovern Library closed after Hurricane Harvey hit Houston in 2017. Its tentative reopening is in 2019.

== Media ==
The Houston Chronicle is the area regional newspaper.

The West University Examiner is a local newspaper distributed in the community.

The Village News and Southwest News is a local newspaper distributed in the community.

In the mid-20th century the community newspaper Southwestern Times served the Braeswood area and surrounding communities. The paper was headquartered in Rice Village.
