= List of killings by law enforcement officers in the United States, May 2021 =

This is a list of people reported killed by non-military law enforcement officers in the United States in May 2021, whether in the line of duty or not, and regardless of reason or method. The listing documents the occurrence of a death, making no implications regarding wrongdoing or justification on the part of the person killed or officer involved. Killings are arranged by date of the incident that caused death. Different death dates, if known, are noted in the description. The table below lists 39 people.

== May 2021 ==
Date	Name (age) of deceased	Race	Location	Description
2021-05-31	Demetrius Stanley (31)	Black	San Jose, California	Video showed Stanley leave his house and walk down the sidewalk holding a handgun and looking in parked cars. When Stanley passed an unmarked police SUV, he opened the door, pointed his gun at the vehicle, and was shot dead by the officer inside.
2021-05-31	Michael Jackson (29)	White	Quimby, Louisiana	
2021-05-31	Roger Dale Keller (71)	White	Jemison, Alabama	
2021-05-31	Antonio Christopher Jones (26)	Black	Houston, Texas	
2021-05-31	Joshua Lee Moore (33)	Unknown race	Tucson, Arizona	
2021-05-31	Bilal Ibn Shabazz Winston (29)	Black	Yucca Valley, California	
2021-05-30	Hank Miller (48)	White	Antlers, Oklahoma	A local man was shot by a Pushmataha County deputy after another deputy was hit by the vehicle Miller was driving during a pursuit.
2021-05-30	Ryan Bernal (32)	White	Louisville, Kentucky	In the Jacobs area, LMPD responded to a stolen vehicle report after two men fled away with the vehicle. One of the officers fatally shot Bernal while the other suspect continued to flee.
2021-05-30	Shannon Wright (29)	Black	Denver, Colorado	Wright approached the drive thru window of a Divino Wine & Spirits store and threatened an employee with an assault rifle. Police located Wright a block away in Washington Park West and shot him dead when he ignored their commands and walked towards the officers threatening them with his rifle.
2021-05-29	Arnold Hager (37)	White	Jacksonville, Florida	Hager, a St. Mary's County, Maryland fugitive indicted for sex crimes, was the subject of a search warrant at a house. He was shot by Jacksonville Sheriff's Office and Florida Department of Law Enforcement officers after he allegedly fired shots at them as they approached the residence. Hager died of his injuries on May 31.
2021-05-26	Efren Gomez (80)	Hispanic	San Tan Valley, Arizona	Police were called after Gomez and his wife got into a fight over their upcoming divorce. Police say that when they arrived, Gomez was holding a knife and scissors and stabbing himself. Police shot Gomez when he allegedly lunged at them with the scissors.
2021-05-26	Devyn Walker (34)	Native American	Holy Cross, Alaska	Police were called after Walker allegedly shot and killed his father, Alden Walker, on May 25, causing a standoff between him and Alaska State Troopers. Devyn Walker barricaded himself inside his home, and was shot dead by a trooper during the standoff.
2021-05-24	Vedo Hall (26)	Black	Washington, D.C.	Police responded to a call for a woman possibly being held against her will in a building. When police arrived, Hall—carrying a rifle with a drum magazine—broke out a back window and escaped with the woman. Several hours later police found the pair, and Hall was shot dead when he raised his gun at an officer.
2021-05-24	Leonardo Rodriguez-Mendoza (46)	Hispanic	Queens, New York	
2021-05-24	Marcelo Pelaez (46)	Hispanic	Queens, New York	
2021-05-23	Roderick Devonne Merchant Jr. (21)	Black	College Station, Texas	Officers responded to a call of a man pointing a rifle at people while forcing his way into apartments. Merchant was shot when he fired at officers while advancing towards them, and died later at hospital.
2021-05-21	Zaekwon Malik Gullatte-Graves (25)	Black	Houston, Texas	Zaekwon Gullate approached four Houston police officers in the Westwood area while they were conducting an unrelated traffic stop. Gullate can be heard telling the officers to shoot him. Gullate then draws a gun from his pocket and fired at least one shot towards the officers and officers returned fire. Gullate was pronounced dead at the hospital.
2021-05-20	Patrick Watkins (31)	Black	Pittsburg, California	Police received a 911 call from Watkins ex-girlfriend stating he was banging on her door. Officers tried to talk to Watkins and as they spoke, Watkins was retreating up a flight of stairs. The officers shouted at him to stop and drop his handgun but he continued walking away from them. Watkins was shot by police and later pronounced dead at the scene.
2021-05-19	Darion M. Lafayette (24)	Black	Champaign, Illinois	Responding to a domestic disturbance call at an apartment complex, two officers exited their vehicle and encountered Lafayette, who was armed and exchanged gunfire with the officers. Lafayette died at the scene, one officer was shot and died later in hospital, and the second officer was wounded.
2021-05-17	Yong Liu (57)	Asian	Monterey Park, California	Liu was shot and killed after allegedly following an officer into a parking lot with a knife and charging at him.
2021-05-16	Deven Telford (34)	White	Omaha, Nebraska	
2021-05-16	Timothy Fleming (49)	Black	Baltimore, Maryland	Officers responded to a man wielding a knife. On scene, Timothy Fleming was holding his fiance at knifepoint. Officers used de-escalation techniques and repeatedly tried to reason with Fleming. Fleming grabbed his finance by the hair and motion like he was going to stab or strike her with the knife. Officers then fired their guns. Fleming was fatally struck and died on the scene.
2021-05-11	Lance Lowe (30)	Black	Stockton, California	Stockton Police responded to a call of a woman being assaulted at a house. When an officer arrived, Lance Lowe opened the door and shot and killed the officer. Lowe shot at another officer, then went inside his house and returned holding his eight-year-old son, who he began to strangle. Lowe was tackled and the child was freed, and Lowe was shot by police.
2021-05-09	Zachary Richardson (24)	White	Leicester, Massachusetts	Richardson rammed his car into the front door of the Leicester Police Department, and was shot to death after pointing what appeared to be a rifle at police.
2021-05-07	Mark Aitulagi Lavea (47)	Unknown	San Andreas, California	Lavea was holding a woman at gunpoint and was shot by deputies. Lavea was pronounced dead at the scene.
2021-05-05	William Holt (49)	White	Las Vegas, Nevada	
2021-05-05	Edwin Joseph Castillo (34)	Hispanic	Winston-Salem, North Carolina	
2021-05-04	Latoya Denis James (37)	Black	Woodbine, Georgia	
2021-05-04	Charles W. Hubbard (13)	Unknown	Moline, Illinois	While responding to a hit-and-run, an officer struck Hubbard, who was riding a bicycle on the road parallel to the sidewalk, in the direction of the officer. The officer was traveling at roughly 56 mph (90 km/h), above the posted speed limit of 40 mph (64 km/h), and did not have lights or sirens on. Despite having swerved to avoid him, a fatal accident followed; Hubbard was transported to a local hospital and pronounced dead later that day. Two months later, the officer was cleared of all charges.
2021-05-04	Ashton Pinke (27)	Black	Mesquite, Texas	Officers were dispatched to a 911 hang-up call where the dispatcher heard screaming and what sounded like a struggle in the background. On scene, officers found Pinke on the side of the building holding a knife and a club. Police state Pinke charged at the officers with both items and that both officers shot him. Pinke was pronounced dead at a hospital.
2021-05-03	Eric Derell Smith (30)	Black	Mississippi (Biloxi)	Police were pursuing Eric Derell Smith, who was suspected in a double murder in Baker, Louisiana. After an officer bumped Smith's car on the highway, it stopped in a grassy median. A shootout occurred between Smith and police, during which both he and his kidnapped 4-month old son, who was in the car, were shot and killed.
2021-05-03	La'Mello Parker (4 months)	Black	Mississippi (Biloxi)	Police were pursuing Eric Derell Smith, who was suspected in a double murder in Baker, Louisiana. After an officer bumped Smith's car on the highway, it stopped in a grassy median. A shootout occurred between Smith and police, during which both he and his kidnapped 4-month old son, who was in the car, were shot and killed.
2021-05-03	Mariano Villegas (45)	Hispanic	Glendale, Arizona	
2021-05-03	Roy Gordon Cole (31)	White	Langley, Virginia	Cole was shot and killed by FBI agents after attempting to drive into CIA headquarters. One official stated he was shot after exiting his car and claiming he had a bomb, while another stated he was shot after exiting with a sword. He died the next day. Cole had attempted to drive into CIA headquarters several times before, and there were questions about his mental state.
2021-05-02	Anthony Williams (57)	White	Hamilton Township, Ohio	
2021-05-01	Bruce Pofahl (62)	White	Ashwaubenon, Wisconsin	A man who opened fire at a tribal casino near Green Bay, killing two and injuring a third, was shot and killed by police.
2021-05-01	Jacob Griffin (23)	White	Nashville, Tennessee	
2021-05-01	Alexander Tuzinski (30)	White	South Haven, Indiana	
2021-05-01	Dalton Buckholz (28)	White	Cañon City, Colorado	

== See also ==
- Death in custody § United States
- Henry A. Wallace Police Crime Public Database
- List of cases of police brutality
- List of countries with annual rates and counts for killings by law enforcement officers
- List of law enforcement officers killed in the line of duty in the United States
- List of law enforcement officers convicted for an on-duty killing in the United States
- List of shootings by US immigration agents
- List of police reforms related to the George Floyd protests
- List of unarmed African Americans killed by law enforcement officers in the United States
- Lists of killings by law enforcement officers
- Police brutality in the United States
- Police misconduct § United States
- Police riot § United States
- Police use of deadly force in the United States
