= KVCC =

KVCC may refer to:

- KVCC (FM), a radio station (88.5 FM) licensed to serve Tucson, Arizona, United States
- Kalamazoo Valley Community College, a community college in Michigan
- Kennebec Valley Community College, a community college in Maine
- Knollwood Village Civic Club, which manages Knollwood Village, Houston
