= Westwood, Houston =

Westwood can refer to two different areas within Houston:

- Westwood (district), Houston
- Westwood (subdivision), Houston
