= Westwood (subdivision), Houston =

Residential subdivision in Houston, Texas, U.S.

Coordinates: 29.6775°N 95.5570°W

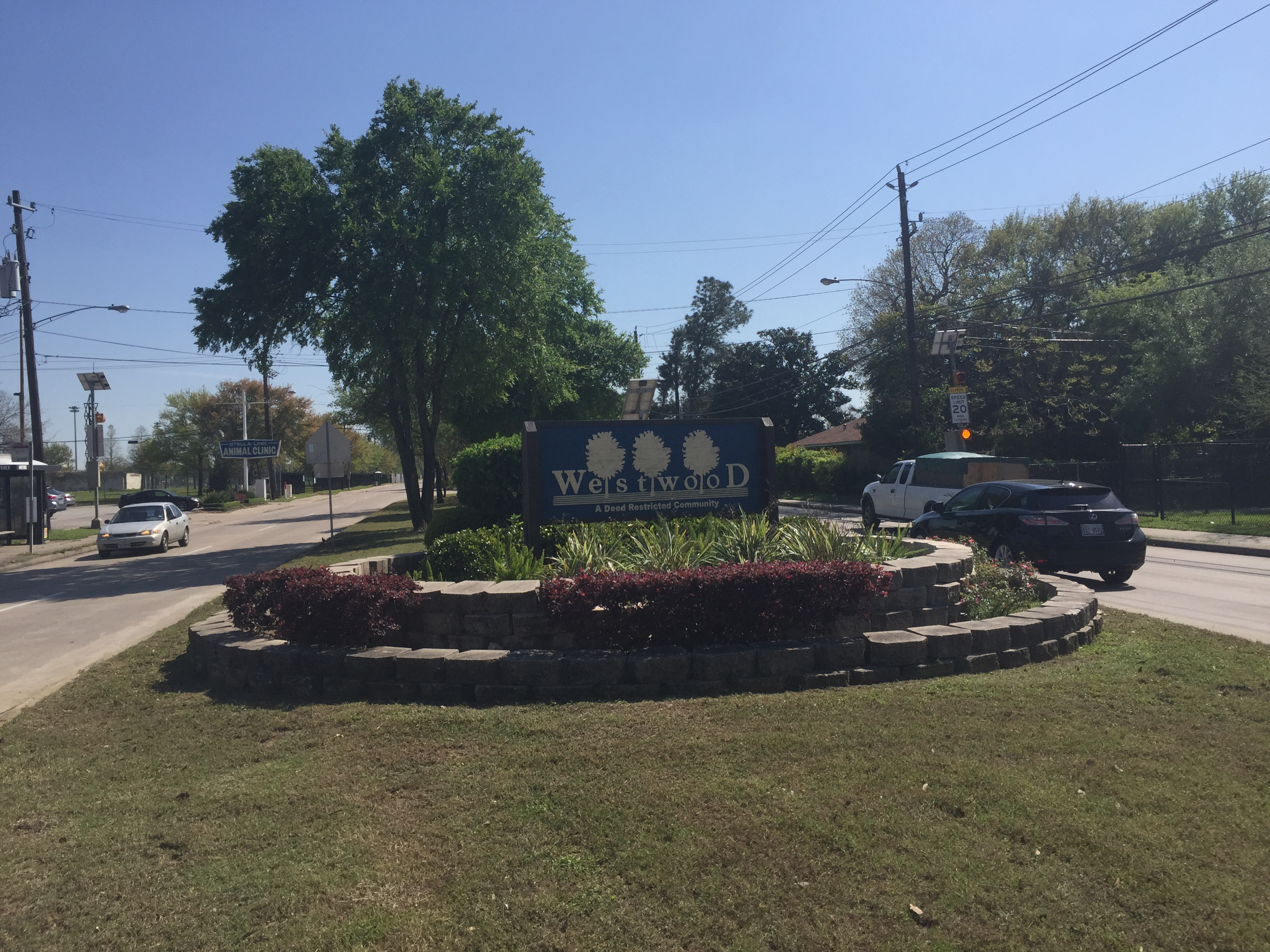
Westwood

Westwood is a residential subdivision in Southwest Houston, Texas. The subdivision is bounded by the 610 Loop, the Union Pacific railroad tracks, Stella Link Road, and Willowbend Boulevard. It has about 800 houses.

Sergeant J. W. Collins of the Houston Police Department (HPD) Southwest Patrol Division and the head of the Beechnut Police Station's Tactical Response Team, stated that according to an HPD study of the crime statistics comparing those of January to May 1989 to January to May 1988, after the Link Valley complexes closed, Class 1 and Class 2 crime decreased in several neighborhoods. (Note: Crimes such as aggravated assault, burger, manslaughter, murder, rape, and robbery were classified as Class 1 offenses. Crimes such as assault, embezzlement, forgery, gambling, and narcotics were classified as Class 2 offenses.)In Westwood, Class 1 crime decreased by 3 percent and Class 2 crime decreased by 23%.

In 2009 the civic club founded a Citizens on Patrol program.

== Education ==
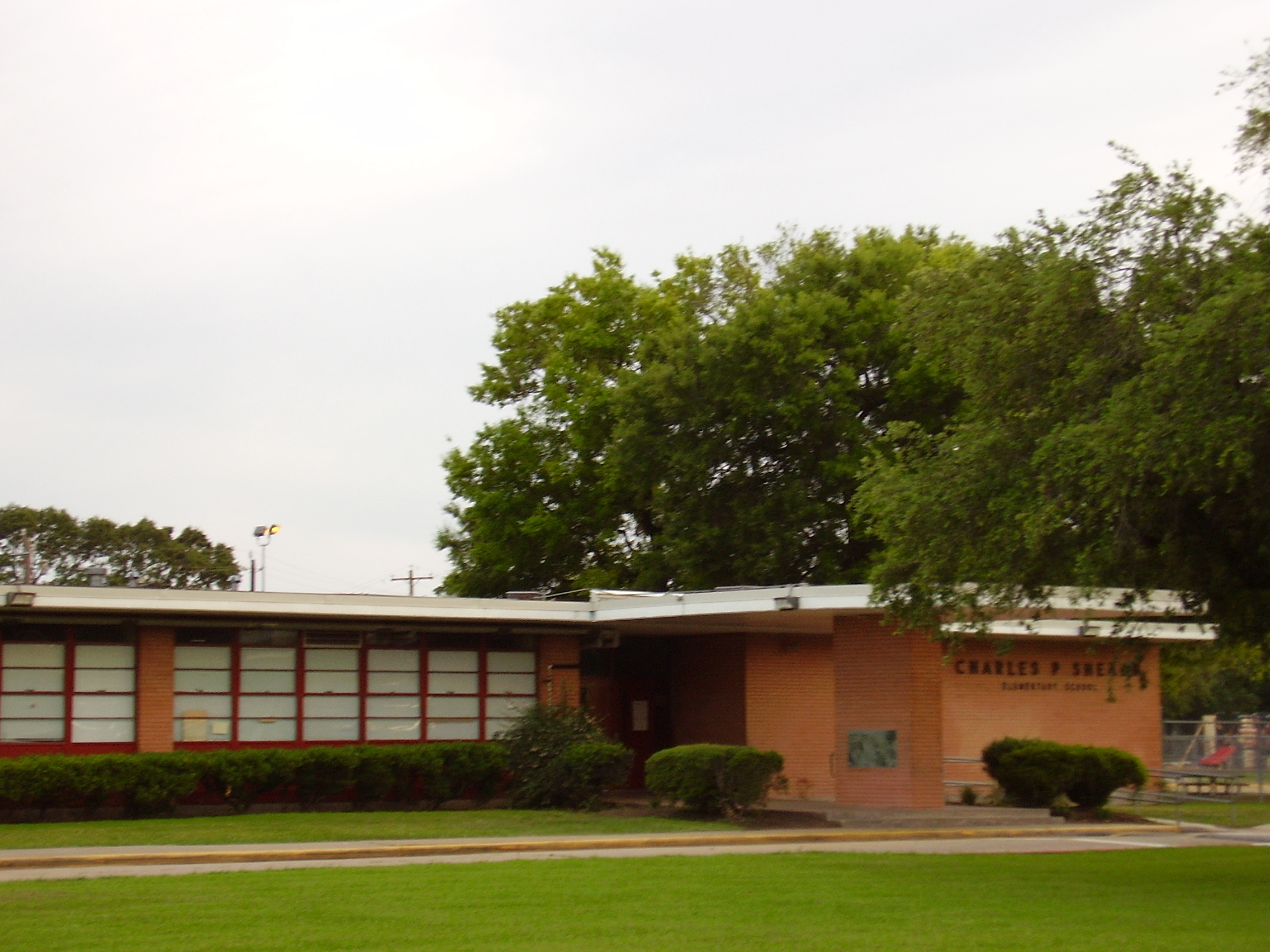
Shearn Elementary School

The Houston Independent School District operates area public schools. Shearn Elementary School and a park are in Section 4.

All houses are zoned to Shearn Elementary School and Pershing Middle School. Pershing-zoned students have the option to apply for the regular program at Pin Oak Middle School in the city of Bellaire. Houses north of West Bellfort are zoned to Bellaire High School, which is also in the city of Bellaire. Houses south of West Bellfort are zoned to Westbury High School.

The Roman Catholic Archdiocese of Galveston-Houston operates Corpus Christi Catholic School in Westwood. Circa 2002 it had 137 students. From 2011 to 2012 enrollment grew by 7%, with 215 students to be enrolled in the 2012-2013 school year. By 2012 the school could not enroll all prospective students in each grade, with the filled-to-capacity grades having wait lists.

=== History of education ===
In 1970 Westwood, along with some other White communities, was rezoned from Westbury to Madison High School because of a court ruling. By 1990, Westbury was about 50% Black, 25% White, 15% Hispanic, and 10% Asian while Madison was 1% White. In 1992 an attendance boundary shift occurred but Westwood was still in the Madison zone. The residents wanted to be rezoned to Westbury. Rod Paige, then the board president and HISD trustee for district 9, and board member Donald R. McAdams attended a meeting at a house of a Westwood community leader on May 12, 1992.

McAdams, who authored Fighting to Save Our Urban Schools-- and Winning!: Lessons from Houston, recalled that the Westwood residents said "Westwood is an integrated community. Whites, blacks, [sic] Hispanics, and Asians live happily together in almost perfect balance. All of us want to be rezoned from Madison to Westbury. Westbury is our neighborhood high school. It is closer than Madison." McAdams wrote that the demographics of the community meeting confirmed the statement about ethnic diversity. According to McAdams, HISD superintendent Frank Petruzielo initially did not adopt the recommendations from himself and Paige because he feared black administrators in HISD would not support the move, so McAdams and Westwood community leaders made a presentation to the HISD board explaining the merits of the case. The board unanimously rezoned the community to Westbury.

== Parks and recreation ==
The City of Houston operates Westwood Park, located in Section 4.

== Infrastructure ==
Harris Health System (formerly Harris County Hospital District) designated Martin Luther King Health Center in southeast Houston for ZIP code 77025. The nearest public hospital is Ben Taub General Hospital in the Texas Medical Center.
