= Knollwood Village, Houston =

Subdivision of Houston, Texas

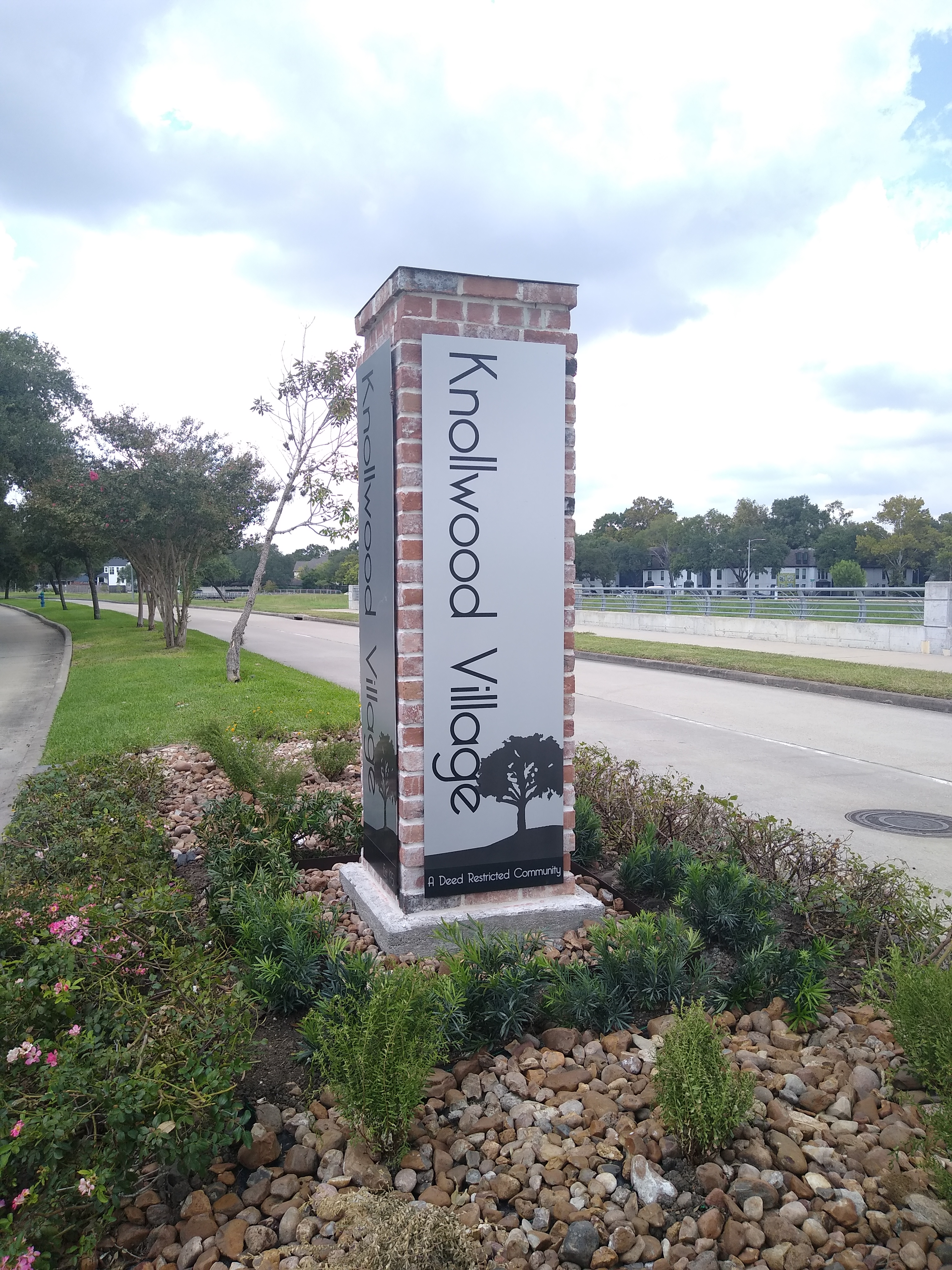
Knollwood Village

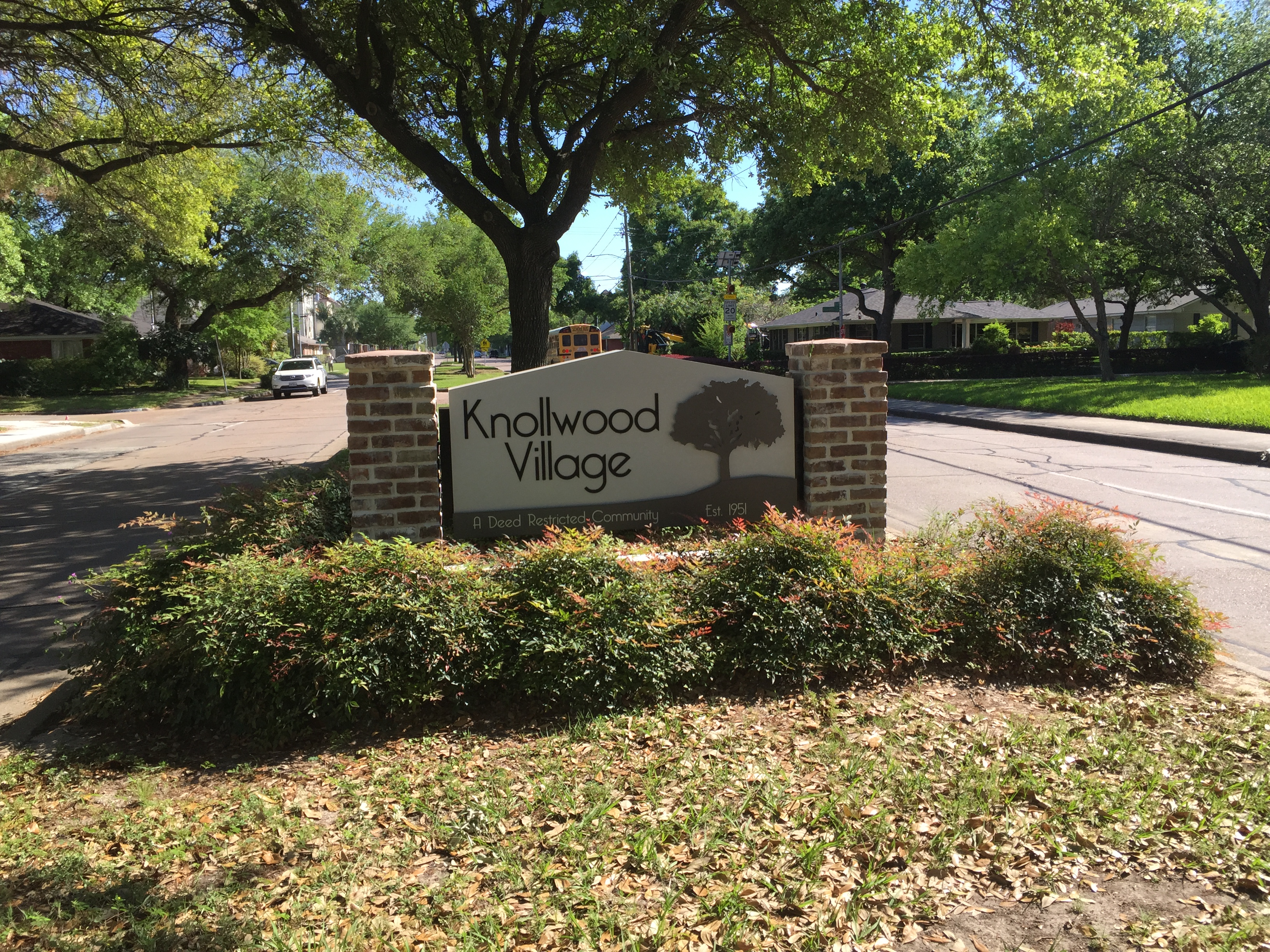
Knollwood Village

Knollwood Village is a subdivision in Houston, Texas. It is managed by the Knollwood Village Civic Club (KVCC), which governs Knollwood Village sections 1-10 and Braes Terrace II.

== History ==
Knollwood Village is built on the former site of the Main Street Airport. Flori Meeks of the Houston Chronicle stated that the airport had been built at least by the 1930s. According to David Fitts, who once served as the president of the KVCC, the first houses were built between 1951 and 1953. The airport closed in 1952. Heather Saucier of the Houston Chronicle wrote that in the community, the rumor was that it was named after a knoll "because the area rarely flooded." Knollwood Village predates the 610 Loop and the Houston Astrodome. According to Meeks, at that time Knollwood Village, "was in what was considered the outer boundaries of Houston."

By 2013 many older houses were being torn down and replaced with newer ones larger than the original ones. On Saturday June 15, 2013, the 60th annviersary of the community was celebrated at the Linkwood Park Community Center.

== Composition ==
Knollwood Village is inside the 610 Loop, in proximity to Reliant Park, south of South Braeswood and west of South Main. The community is about 2 miles (3.2 km) away from the Texas Medical Center and 5 miles (8.0 km) away from Downtown Houston.

The original houses are 1950s ranch-style houses.

== Demographics ==
In 2013 the Knollwood Village Civic Club president, David Fitts, stated that the community was becoming more ethnically diverse.

== Education ==
Residents are assigned to schools in the Houston Independent School District.

They are zoned to Longfellow Elementary School, which is located in Braes Manor Section 1 in Braeswood Place, as well as Pershing Middle School in Braeswood Place, and Bellaire High School in the City of Bellaire. Any student zoned to Pershing may apply to Pin Oak Middle School's (in the city of Bellaire) regular program.

== Healthcare ==
Harris Health System (formerly Harris County Hospital District) designated Martin Luther King Health Center in southeast Houston for ZIP code 77025. The nearest public hospital is Ben Taub General Hospital in the Texas Medical Center.

== Parks and recreation ==
Linkwood Park is in the area. Linkwood Park and Community Center is in Braes Manor Section 1 in Braeswood Place.
