= Stella, Harris County, Texas =

Human settlement in United States of America

Coordinates: 29.669795°N 95.399716°W

Stella, in Harris County, Texas was formerly an unincorporated area located approximately 10 miles southwest of downtown Houston. It existed there during the late 1800s through the 1920s and then it disappeared from area maps. During the 1950s the area was annexed into the City of Houston

Over the years various railroad lines went through, crossed, and connected with the area. A railroad timetable from the era shows Stella as a stop with access to connecting trains. The identifier "Stella" is affixed to the signal bungalow located next to the tracks along Holmes Road about 1/4 mile west of Kirby Drive.

The modern day Stella Link Road in Houston gets its name from Stella, Texas. It began as a rural road running parallel to the railroad that linked West University, Texas to Stella. Today Stella Link Road is a busy urban street that still makes that link to the locale formerly known as Stella.
