= Interstate 610 (Texas) =

Interstate Highway in Texas, United States

Interstate 610
- I-610 highlighted in red

Route information
- Auxiliary route of I-10
- Maintained by TxDOT
- Length: 37.972 mi (61.110 km)
- Existed: 1959–present
- NHS: Entire route

Major junctions
- Beltway around Houston
- I-10 / US 90; I-69 / US 59; I-45; US 290; SH 288 / SH 288 Toll; SH 225

Location
- Country: United States
- State: Texas
- Counties: Harris

Highway system
- Interstate Highway System; Main; Auxiliary; Suffixed; Business; Future; Highways in Texas; Interstate; US; State; Former; Toll; Loops; Spurs; FM/RM; Park; Rec
← SH 550	→ I-635

Interstate 610 (I-610 (Note: Some sources use "IH-610", as "IH" is an abbreviation used by TxDOT for Interstate Highways.)) is an auxiliary Interstate Highway that forms a 37.972-mile-long (61.110 km) loop around the inner city sector of the city of Houston, Texas. I-610, colloquially known as The Loop, Loop 610, The Inner Loop, or just 610, traditionally marks the border between the inner city of Houston ("inside the Loop") and its surrounding areas. It is the innermost of the three Houston beltways, the other two being Beltway 8 (Sam Houston Parkway/Tollway) and State Highway 99 (SH 99; Grand Parkway), of which various segments are under construction or planning. In Houston, the area inside I-610 is the urban core. Jeff Balke of the Houston Press wrote that the freeway "is as much a social and philosophical divide as a physical one". Mike Snyder in the Houston Chronicle wrote that, as someone from inside I-610, he historically felt "kind of special" due to being close to "the city's historical core and its major business, educational and cultural institutions".

== Route description ==
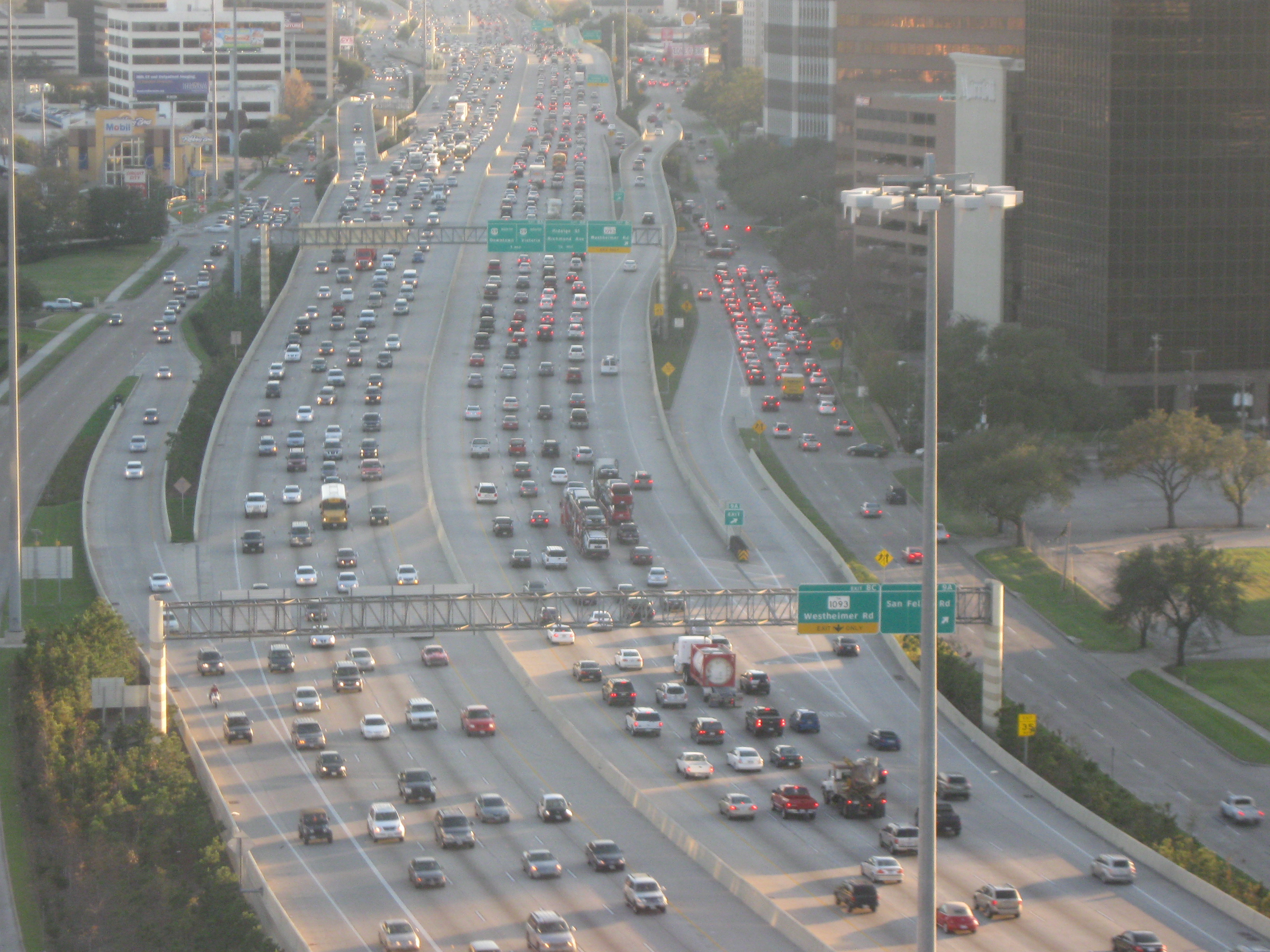
I-610 seen from Park Towers South; view toward the interchange with I-69/US 59 to the south in 2009

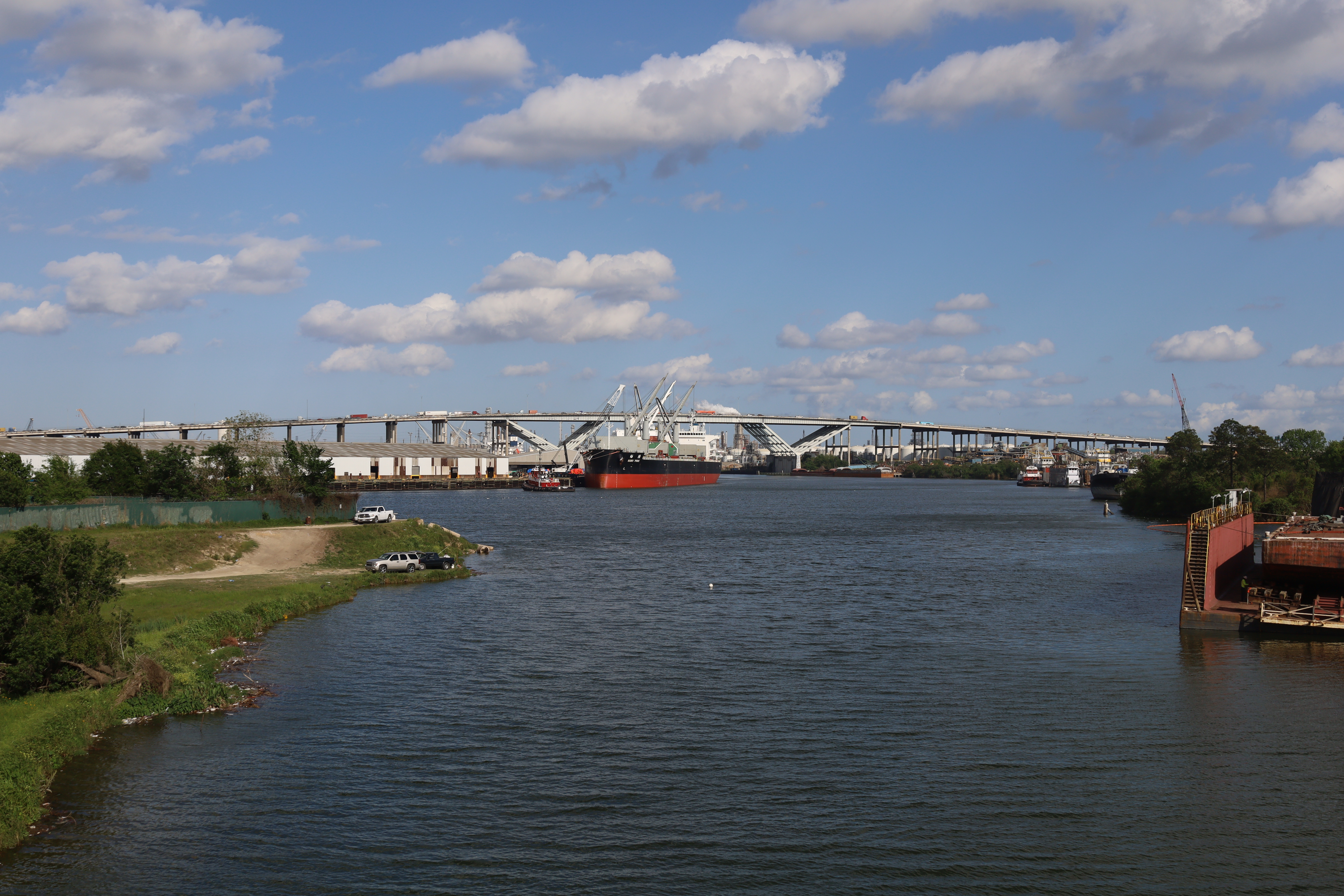
I-610 crosses the Houston Ship Channel on the Sidney Sherman Bridge, pictured in 2026

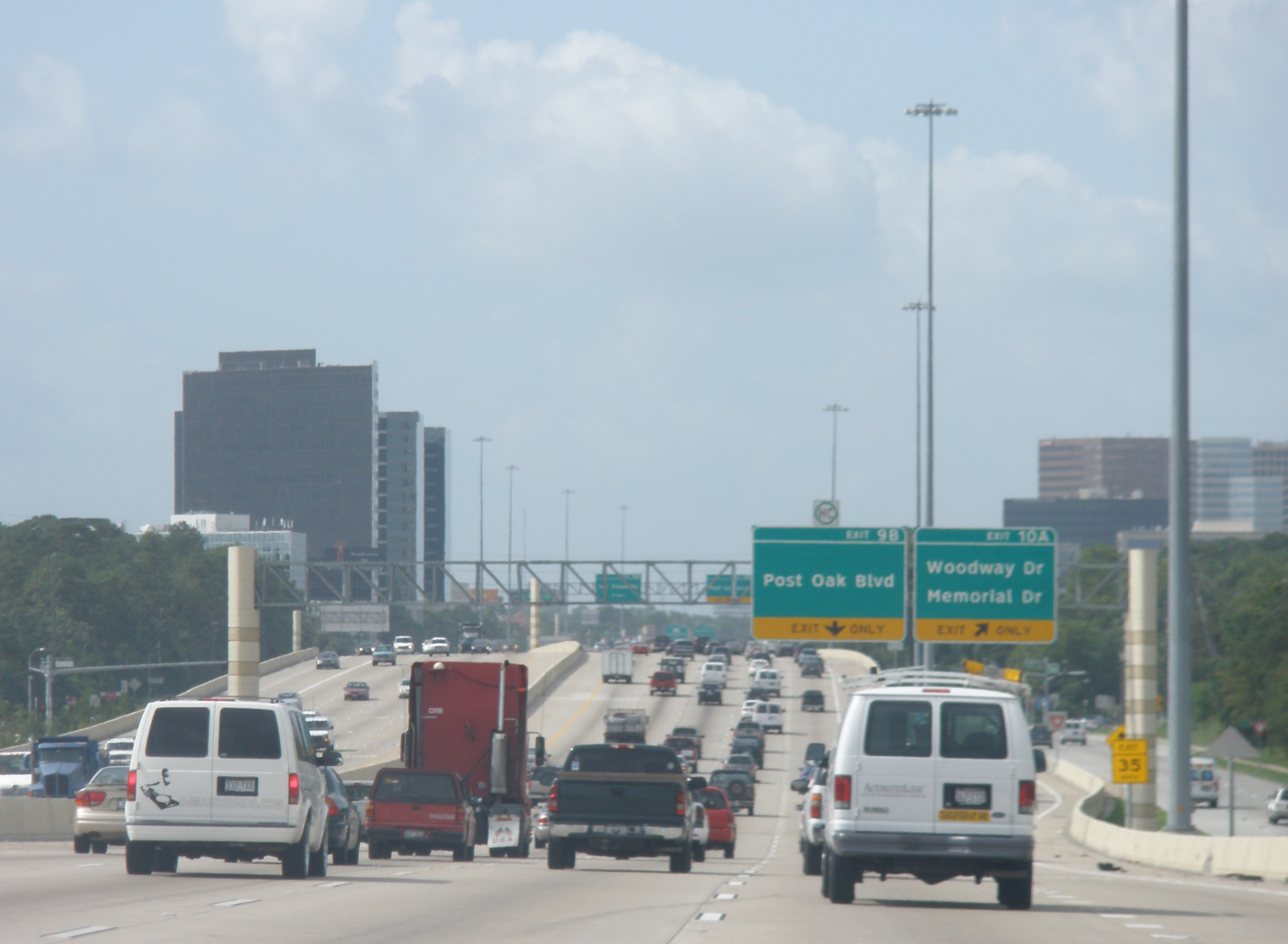
I-610 "West Loop South" just south from I-10 west in 2009

Major segments of I-610 are known as the North Loop, the South Loop, the East Loop, and the West Loop. The North Loop runs from U.S. Highway 290 (US 290) to US 90, the East Loop runs from US 90 to SH 225, the West Loop runs from US 290 to the South Post Oak Road spur, and the South Loop runs from South Post Oak Road to SH 225. Sometimes, a direction name is added as a suffix to denote a more specific part of a portion of the loop and this does not denote the direction of traffic flow. For example:

- The North Loop West Freeway refers to the portion of the North Loop between US 290 and I-45. The North Loop East Freeway refers to the portion between I-45 and US 90.
- The East Loop North Freeway refers to the portion of the East Loop between US 90 and I-10. The East Loop South Freeway refers to the portion between I-10 and SH 225.
- The South Loop East Freeway refers to the portion of the South Loop between SH 225 and SH 288. The South Loop West Freeway refers to the portion between SH 288 and the South Post Oak Road spur.
- The West Loop South Freeway refers to the portion of the West Loop between the South Post Oak Road spur and Buffalo Bayou (which is just south of I-10/US 90). The West Loop North Freeway refers to the portion between Buffalo Bayou and US 290.

=== Lane configurations ===
Starting at US 290, moving in a clockwise direction, mainlane counts are as follows:

- Four lanes each way between US 290 and I-45
- Six lanes each way between I-45 and I-69/US 59
- Four lanes each way between I-69/US 59 and I-10
- Five lanes each way between I-10 and SH 225
- Four lanes each way between SH 225 and SH 288
- Five lanes each way between SH 288 and the South Post Oak Road spur
- Five lanes northbound and four lanes southbound between the South Post Oak Road spur and Bissonnet exit
- Five lanes northbound and five lanes southbound between the Bissonnet and Bellaire Boulevard exits
- Four lanes northbound and five lanes southbound between the Bellaire Boulevard exit and Woodway Drive
- Five lanes each way Woodway Drive and I-10/US 90
- Six lanes each way between I-10/US 90 and US 290

== History ==
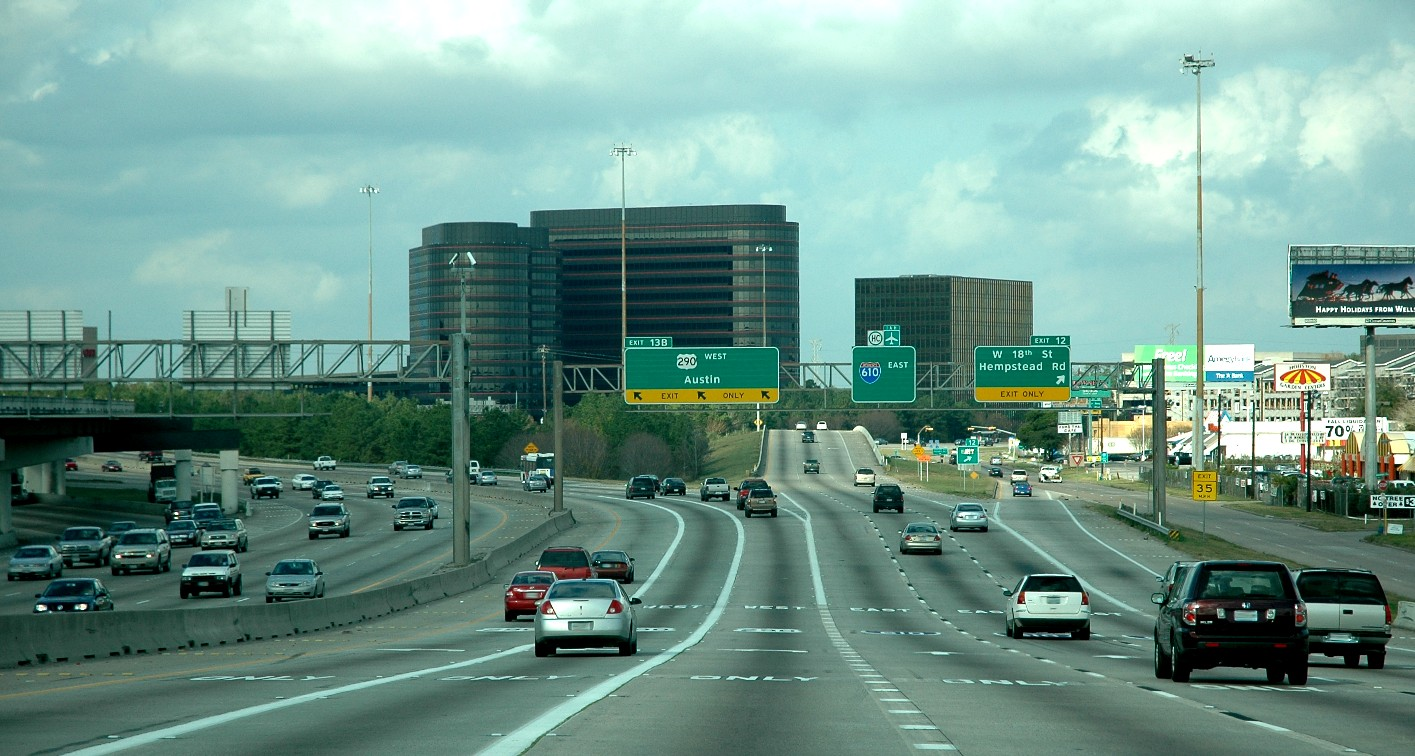
I-610 eastbound at US 290 in Houston, a few years before reconstruction, 2006

The concept of building a bypass highway around Houston was first proposed in 1931, but plans did not begin to formalize until 1941. The loop was initially proposed to transport troops and materials around the city. On May 3, Harris County voters approved a bond to build the "Defense Loop". It was officially designated as Loop 137 in 1942, and the North Loop was approved by the Texas Transportation Commission. World War II delayed construction of the loop until the 1950s.

In July 1953, the city of Houston asked the Texas Transportation Commission to include two new sections of Loop 137 (the West and South loops) as part of the state's highway system. It was initially rejected, but, in October 1954, the North Loop was upgraded to a freeway, and the West and South loops were approved as freeways.

When the Interstate Highway System was authorized in 1956, the then-C-shaped Loop 137 (now designated I-610) was adopted into the plan. The East Loop would not be approved until 1960. That segment was finished in 1973 with the opening of the Sidney Sherman Bridge over the Houston Ship Channel.

Construction on the North Loop began in 1950. Construction was sporadic throughout the 1950s and 1960s. It was completed in 1976 with the interchange that connects I-610 to I-10 east of Houston.

In the early 1990s, the Texas Department of Transportation (TxDOT) proposed a widening project for the West Loop, which, at the time, was the busiest freeway in Houston. One of the proposals was for a dual–dual freeway with a total of 24 lanes in some places, which would have made it the widest freeway in the world. Amid vocal opposition and little apparent support, the plans for expansion were canceled.

In the late 1990s, the need to repave and reconstruct portions of the West Loop became evident. The reconstruction project was approved, but only as a "no-capacity-added" project; only safety and structural improvements could be made. Some Houston residents, however, have noted that merging lanes and exit ramps are particularly long and, in effect, serve as additional lanes.

As of 2014, the segment of the West Loop from the Katy Freeway (I-10) to the Southwest Freeway (I-69) is ranked by TxDOT as the most congested roadway in the state, based on annual hours of delay per mile.

Parts of I-610 flooded during Hurricane Harvey in 2017.

== Exit list ==
The entire highway is in Harris County.

Location	mi	km	Exit	Destinations	Notes
Houston	0.73	1.17	1A	FM 521 (Almeda Road)	Eastbound (counterclockwise) exit only; former SH 288
Houston	1.34	2.16	1B	Fannin Street	No direct westbound (clockwise) exit (signed at exit 1A)
Houston	1.89	3.04	1C	Kirby Drive	
Houston	2.81	4.52	2	US 90 Alt. (South Main Street) / Buffalo Speedway	
Houston	3.57	5.75	3	Stella Link Road	
Houston	4.62– 4.78	7.44– 7.69	4A	South Braeswood Boulevard / North Braeswood Boulevard / Beechnut Street	
Houston	4.62– 4.78	7.44– 7.69	4B	South Post Oak Road / West Bellfort Avenue	Signed direction switches between east–west and north–south; left exit westbound
Houston	5.28	8.50	5A	Beechnut Street	No direct northbound (clockwise) exit (signed at exit 4A)
Bellaire	5.92	9.53	5B	Evergreen Street	No direct southbound (counterclockwise) exit (signed at exit 6)
Bellaire	6.42	10.33	6	Bellaire Boulevard / Bissonnet Street / Fournace Place / Evergreen Street	
Bellaire	6.83– 7.17	10.99– 11.54	7	Bissonnet Street / Fournace Place	No direct northbound (clockwise) exit (signed at exit 6)
Houston	7.84	12.62	7	Westpark Drive / Richmond Avenue	Northbound (clockwise) exit and southbound (counterclockwise) entrance
Houston	8.02	12.91	8A-B	I-69 / US 59 – Victoria, Downtown Houston	I-69/US 59 exit 123; signed as exits 8A (north) & 8B (south); redesigned stack interchange
Houston	8.24– 8.48	13.26– 13.65	8C	Hidalgo Street / Richmond Avenue	Southbound (counterclockwise) exit and northbound (clockwise) entrance; no access to Hidalgo from southbound frontage road
Houston	8.87	14.27	8D	FM 1093 (Westheimer Road)	Signed as exit 8C northbound
Houston	9.32– 9.79	15.00– 15.76	9	San Felipe Road / Post Oak Boulevard	Signed as exits 9A (San Felipe Road) and 9B (Post Oak Boulevard) southbound (counterclockwise)
Houston	10.62– 11.12	17.09– 17.90	10	Woodway Drive / Memorial Drive	Two identical exits southbound (counterclockwise): 10B before the merge from I-10 and 10A after
Houston	11.65	18.75	11	I-10 (US 90) – San Antonio, Downtown Houston	I-10 exit 763
Houston	11.92	19.18	12	Katy Road	Southbound exit only
Houston	12.68– 13.15	20.41– 21.16	12A	West 18th Street / Hempstead Road / Minimax Drive	Northbound (clockwise) exit and southbound (counterclockwise) entrance
Houston	13.28	21.37	13A	US 290 west – Austin	Redesigned tri-stack interchange
Houston	13.84– 13.94	22.27– 22.43	13B	West T.C. Jester Boulevard / East T.C. Jester Boulevard	
Houston	14.64	23.56	14	Ella Boulevard	Access to Memorial Hermann Northwest Hospital
Houston	15.69– 15.78	25.25– 25.40	15	Spur 261 (North Shepherd Drive) / North Durham Drive	Access to Northwest Health Center
Houston	16.44– 16.91	26.46– 27.21	16	Yale Street / North Main Street	Signed as exits 16A (Yale Street) and 16B (North Main Street) eastbound (clockwise)
Houston	17.46	28.10	17A	Airline Drive	Eastbound (clockwise) exit and westbound (counterclockwise) entrance
Houston	17.88	28.78	17	I-45 – Dallas, Downtown Houston, IAH Airport	Signed as exits 17B (north) and 17C (south); left exits to 45 north eastbound & 45 south westbound; I-45 exit 51
Houston	18.22– 18.74	29.32– 30.16	18	Irvington Boulevard / Fulton Street	
Houston	19.28– 19.91	31.03– 32.04	19A	Hardy Street / Jensen Drive	Eastbound (clockwise) exit and westbound (counterclockwise) entrance
Houston	19.21– 19.37	30.92– 31.17	19B	Hardy Toll Road north (Spur 548)	
Houston	20.31	32.69	20	I-69 / US 59 – Cleveland, Downtown Houston	I-69/US 59 exit 134 northbound, 135A-B southbound; signed as exits 20A (north) & 20B (south) westbound (counterclockwise)
Houston	20.77	33.43	20C	Hirsch Road	no direct eastbound (clockwise) exit (signed at exit 21)
Houston	21.45	34.52	21	Lockwood Drive / Hirsch Road	Access to Lyndon B. Johnson General Hospital
Houston	22.05– 22.40	35.49– 36.05	22	Homestead Road / Kelley Street	
Houston	23.09	37.16	23A	Kirkpatrick Boulevard	
Houston	23.49– 23.75	37.80– 38.22	23B	North Wayside Drive / Liberty Road	
Houston	24.44– 24.86	39.33– 40.01	24	Bus. US 90 east (McCarty Drive / US 90 Alt. west) / Wallisville Road	Signed as exits 24A (US 90 Bus.) and 24B (Wallisville Road) northbound (counterclockwise)
Houston	25.40	40.88	25	Gellhorn Drive	Southbound (clockwise) exit and northbound (counterclockwise) entrance
Houston	26.03	41.89	26A	I-10 (US 90 west) / US 90 east – Beaumont, Liberty, Downtown Houston	I-10 exit 775A; no access from I-610 south (clockwise) to US 90 east or US 90 west to I-610 north (counterclockwise)
Houston	26.46	42.58	26B	Market Street	Northbound (counterclockwise) exit and southbound (clockwise) entrance
Houston	27.21	43.79	27	Turning Basin Drive	No northbound (counterclockwise) exit
Houston	28.62	46.06	28	Clinton Drive	
Houston	28.96	46.61	29	Port of Houston Main Entrance	
Houston	30.00	48.28	30A	Manchester Street / 92nd Street	Southbound (clockwise) exit and northbound (counterclockwise) entrance
Houston	30.62	49.28	30B-C	SH 225 – Pasadena, La Porte	Signed as exits 30B (east) and 30C (west)
Houston	30.88	49.70	30D	Lawndale Avenue / Broadway Boulevard North	No direct southbound (clockwise) exit (signed at exit 30D)
Houston	31.43	50.58	31	Broadway Boulevard South	
Houston	32.19– 32.38	51.80– 52.11	32	I-45 / SH 35 south – Galveston, Alvin, Downtown Houston, Hobby Airport	Signed as exits 32A (I-45 south) and 32B (I-45 north / SH 35 south); I-45 exit 40
Houston	32.77– 32.91	52.74– 52.96	33	Woodridge Drive / Telephone Road	
Houston	34.08– 34.29	54.85– 55.18	34A	South Wayside Drive / Long Drive	
Houston	34.95– 35.53	56.25– 57.18	35	Crestmont Street / M.L. King Boulevard / Mykawa Road	
Houston	36.05– 36.13	58.02– 58.15	36A	Calais Road / Holmes Road / Cullen Boulevard / M.L. King Boulevard	
Houston	36.49	58.72	36B	FM 865 (Cullen Boulevard)	No direct westbound (clockwise) exit (signed at exit 36A); former FM 518
Houston	37.14	59.77	37	Scott Street	
Houston	38.00 0.00	61.16 0.00	38A/C	SH 288 / SH 288 Toll – Lake Jackson, Freeport, Downtown Houston, IAH Airport	Signed as exits 38A (north) & 38C (south) eastbound (counterclockwise); redesigned stack interchange
1.000 mi = 1.609 km; 1.000 km = 0.621 mi: Incomplete access

== See also ==
- I-610 Ship Channel Bridge
