= Charlotte Allen Fountain =

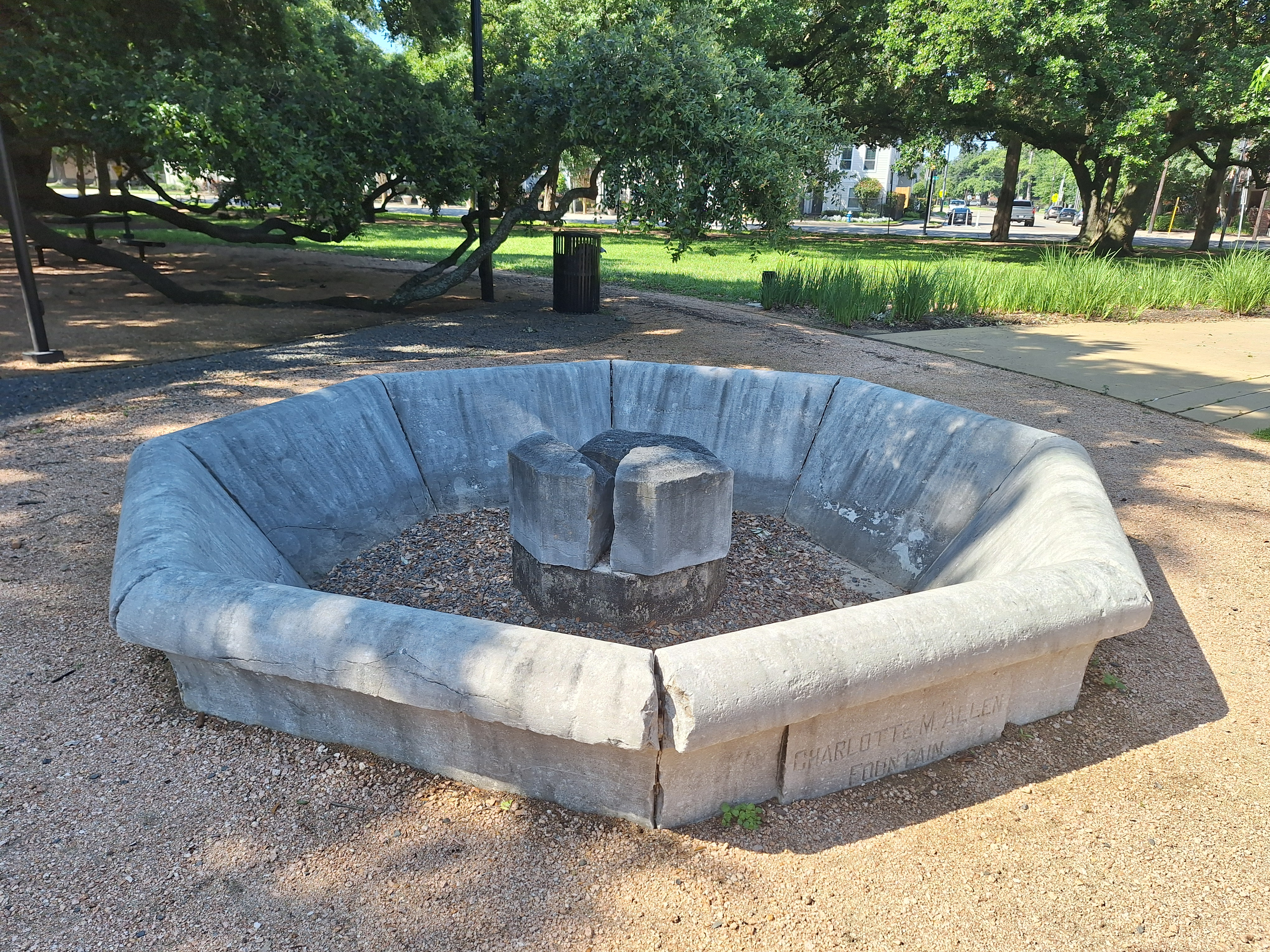
- Remains of the historic Charlotte Allen Fountain
- Artist: Designed by Sanguinet & Staats
- Year: 1912
- Medium: Limestone
- Location: Houston, Texas, U.S.; 29.7386°N 95.3707°W

The Charlotte Allen Fountain is an historic element in Elizabeth Baldwin Park, in the Midtown neighborhood of Houston. The base has an inscription that reads, "Charlotte M. Allen Fountain" and two years: "1896 – 1912" (the year the park's namesake died, and the year the fountain was dedicated at the park). The Houston Parks and Recreation Department states that the fountain 'once included an elaborate, three-tiered centerpiece, which disappeared long ago,' and that there is no record of the centerpiece's artist, purchase, or installation. Newspaper accounts at the time, however, documented the fountain's designers, cost, and a large public dedication ceremony in October 1912.

Charlotte Marie Baldwin Allen is the "Mother of Houston", a key founder, financer, and business and civic leader.

== Elizabeth Baldwin and the park ==
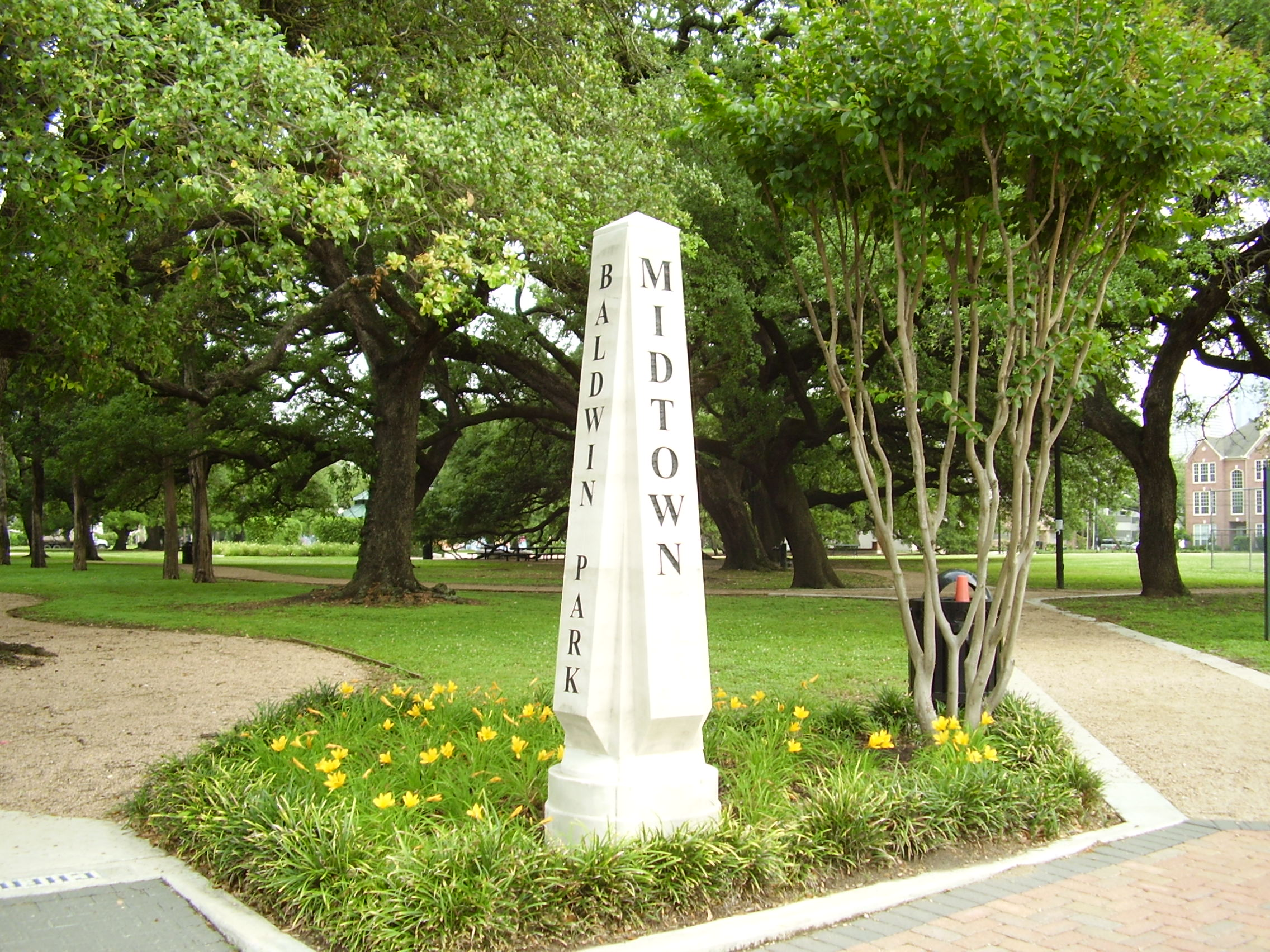
Marker for Elizabeth Baldwin Park

Elizabeth Baldwin Rice (1827–1896) was Charlotte's niece. Her father was Charlotte's brother Horace Baldwin and her second husband was the wealthy William Marsh Rice. She and William lived in both New York City and Houston, and in each state they claimed their primary residence was in the other state, to avoid paying taxes.

Following a stroke in 1895, Elizabeth wrote a will directing how her half of their combined estate would be divided—importantly, Texas had a community property law that gave her half of the wealth acquired during marriage, but New York did not. Among other things, she wanted to set aside $100,000 for a park with her name. Her husband, from his home in New York, worked to have her will overturned. In 1900, William Rice was murdered by his valet and a lawyer hired by Elizabeth's estate.

In 1905, the attorney for Elizabeth Baldwin Rice—former Houston mayor Col. Orren Thaddeus Holt who also formed the city's Parks Department—spent $9,250 of Elizabeth Baldwin Rice's estate (equivalent to about $347,100 in 2026) to buy 4.88 acres for a park, which was then transferred to the City of Houston for $10. In July of that year, there was a free dedication fete at Elizabeth Baldwin park, with a carriage entrance on Crawford Street, refreshments, and an elaborate program of public speeches, singing, a cornet solo, ballads, waltzes, two marches, and a reading selection from The Wonderful Wizard of Oz.

At that time, the park extended along Elgin Street, from Crawford to Chenevert. An adjacent parcel of land, which was along Anita Street from Crawford to Chenevert, was owned by Jesse H. Jones. In 1911, Jones sold the parcel to the City, thus expanding the park's size. Both parcels even then were notable for the massive live oak trees.

== Charlotte Baldwin Allen and the fountain ==
Charlotte Baldwin Allen (1805–1895) is known as the "Mother of Houston": although the city's founding is often attributed to the Allen brothers, it was Charlotte's inheritance that financed its founding, and Charlotte who fostered its growth. Her husband was Augustus Chapman Allen. In the 1830s, they lived in what is now downtown Houston, and by 1850 they were separated with him moving to Mexico while she remained in Houston to actively manage business interests and be a civic leader.

Sanguinet & Staats designed the fountain for free, and presented the design to the Charlotte M. Allen School Parents club (a school that was located at the current site of Houston Academy for International Studies). The club decided the fountain should be erected, formed a committee with Mary Scholibo as chair, and had it built for $1,700 of funds from Elizabeth Baldwin Rice's estate.

The estate's lawyer, Col. Orren Holt, donated the fountain to the city and in October 1912, it was unveiled at the park during another large event that included an opening processional by the chorus from the school; an invocation by Dr. William States Jacobs; speeches by Holt, assistant city attorney J.E. Niday, and judge Edwin B. Parker; and a closing concert by the Municipal band.

== Current condition ==
Midtown Redevelopment Authority made a significant, $500,000 renovation to the park in 2022. The enhancements included a new playground and improved lighting but the fountain remained untouched as an historical element.

== See also ==
- List of public art in Houston
