= James T.D. Wilson =

Mayor of Houston

James Theodore Dudley Wilson

Mayor of Houston
- In office 1874–1875
- Preceded by: Thomas Scanlan
- Succeeded by: Irvin Capers Lord

Second term
- In office 1877–1878
- Preceded by: Irving Capers Lord
- Succeeded by: Andrew J. Burke

Personal details
- Born: July 4, 1820 St. Louis, U.S.
- Died: November 23, 1902 (aged 82) Houston, Texas, U.S.
- Spouse: Mary Adaline Corneila Cone
- Children: Four sons, two daughters
- Profession: merchant

James Theodore Dudley Wilson (July 4, 1820 – November 23, 1902) was a soldier, merchant, banker, and mayor of Houston.

== Early life ==
Wilson was born in St. Louis on July 4, 1820, to Margaret Pendergrast Wilson, the first wife of Robert Wilson, a co-founder of Houston. Margaret died in 1823, after which he lived with a variety of relatives and friends in Virginia, Ohio, Kentucky, Missouri, and Mississippi.

== Career ==
Already working as a clerk as a teenager in Kentucky, Wilson moved to Texas. His first job there was as a sales clerk for W. C. White in Columbia. He enlisted as a private in the Texas Army in 1836. In 1837, he moved to the new temporary capitol of the Republic of Texas, Houston. He followed his father, Robert Wilson, a co-founder of Houston and a merchant there.

In 1874 Texas Governor Richard Coke appointed Wilson to replace Reconstruction mayor Thomas Howe Scanlan. An election later that year retained Wilson as mayor through 1875. Installed as mayor just months after the start of the Panic of 1873, Wilson learned that he inherited about $1.4 million in debt just after the special election for mayor extended his tenure to the rest of 1874. Facing high-levels of municipal debt and declining tax revenue, the fiscal crisis was so desperate that Wilson even paid into the bond fund from his personal account. The rate of municipal revenue could only meet about half of its obligations for its bond interest. Wilson met this dilemma by prioritizing the interests of Houstonians at-large over the interests of the bondholders.

== Personal life ==
Wilson was married Mary Adaline Cornelia Cone. They had six children.

== Death ==
Wilson died on November 23, 1902.

Political offices
| Preceded by Thomas Scanlan | Mayor of Houston, Texas; 1841–1842 | Succeeded by Irvin Capers Lord |
