= Cornelius Ennis =

Cotton shipper and railroad executive

Cornelius Ennis

Cornelius Ennis (September 26, 1813 – February 13, 1899) was a cotton shipper and railroad executive who served as Mayor of Houston, Texas. His shipping enterprise ran Union blockades during the American Civil War.

== Early life and career ==
He was born September 26, 1813, in Belleville, New Jersey where he grew up and received his education. In 1834, he moved to New York City and started work in a drugstore, before using his learned trade to open his own drugstore in Houston in 1839.

He partnered with George W. Kimball and expanded the business, making their first shipment of cotton to Boston in 1841. He married Kimball's sister Jeannette Ingals Kimball the same year. They had four children. Kimball drowned off the Florida coast while escorting a cotton shipment and investment funds to New York in 1842, leading Ennis into his involvement with the railroad as a better transport option that needed investment.

Ennis started and was on the board of directors the Houston and Texas Central Railway in 1853 along with William R. Baker, Paul Bremond, Thomas William House, William J. Hutchins and William Marsh Rice. As mayor he supervised the Houston Tap Railroad completion which was sold in 1858 and became the Houston Tap and Brazoria Railway. He also promoted construction of the Houston Ship Channel.

== Mayor of Houston ==
He became the Mayor of Houston July 1856 and served until December 1857. He had a band of robbers who were robbing shippers arrested.

== Civil War era blockade running ==
In the Civil War he shipped cotton to Cuba and to England via Mexico despite the Union Navy's blockade. His blockade running was so successful that after the war he further expanded his cotton export businesses and invested in the newspaper in Galveston now known as The Daily News.

== Death and legacy ==
He died February 13, 1899, at his home in Houston and is buried at the Glenwood Cemetery in Houston. On the announcement of his death his name was reported as "Col. Cornelius Ennis".

Ennis, Texas, developed as a northern base of operations of the railroad he directed, is named for him. Several other towns in Texas were named for the railroad's directors. He never lived there and there are no records he even ever visited.

Two of his daughters married into newspaper publishing families. Two of his descendants visited the museum in 2008.

Conservative TV talk show host Tucker Carlson is his 3× great-grandson.

Political offices
Preceded by James H. Stevens	Mayor of Houston; 1856–1857	Succeeded by Alexander McGowan
