= Samuel Brashear =

Mayor of Houston

Samuel Houston Brashear

Mayor of Houston
- In office 1898–1900
- Preceded by: Horace Baldwin Rice
- Succeeded by: John D. Woolford

Personal details
- Born: July 9, 1866 Houston, U.S.
- Died: September 17, 1941 (aged 75) Houston, U.S.
- Resting place: Forest Park Cemetery, Houston
- Party: Democratic
- Spouse: Josephine Pereira Brashear
- Relations: John Brashear (father)
- Children: John Joseph Brashear
- Profession: lawyer, judge

Samuel Houston Brashear (July 9, 1866 – September 17, 1941) was a lawyer, judge, and mayor of Houston. Brashear was elected as District Judge in 1892 and challenged Horace Baldwin Rice for mayor in 1898. He served as mayor for two terms and resigned in 1900 to pursue a legal practice.

== Early life ==
Named for Sam Houston—former Army Commander and President of the Republic of Texas, and Governor of the State of Texas—Brashear was born on July 9, 1866. He was the son of John Brashear, a Harris County Clerk.

== Career ==
Brashear, like his father John, started his career as a lawyer. At the age of twenty-seven, he was the youngest person at that time to serve as a state judge after he won his election for District Judge in 1892.

Brashear ran for mayor of Houston in 1898, leading a faction of dissident Democrats, while challenging his own uncle, Horace Baldwin Rice. While Brashear emphasized local control of utilities, he and Rice were similar in background and agreed on important policies, such as advancing aggressive development of the Port of Houston. The local Democrats disenfranchised blacks from primary voting. Once elected, Brashear hired New York engineer Alexander Potter to plan an entire suite of municipally owned public utilities, including a garbage incinerator, a sewage plant, a waterworks, and an electric power plant. He also devised a plan for Sam Houston Park, which included land acquisition, construction of pathways and bridges, and acquisition of public monuments.

In a Democratic city such as Houston, challenges to municipal incumbents came from within the party. John Thomas Browne, a mayor of Houston between 1892 and 1896, formed a slate of candidates and challenged Brashear in 1900. As Houston was planning for public utilities, its earlier Brashear-Potter plan approved in 1897 by referendum called for municipal development and control over its electric power plant and distribution system. Yet private electric companies such as Westinghouse and General Electric vied as private utilities to contract to provide electrical service with Houston. Brashear led his slate of alderman to an impressive victory with 10 of 12 candidates winning office. Browne's alderman candidates only won the two positions in the Second Ward. Yet Brashear's mayoral victory was less impressive since it was decided by only a 241-vote difference.

Upon leaving the mayor's office, he established a law partnership with Charles E. Ashe.

== Personal life ==
Brashear married Josephine Pereira, a daughter of a Houston lawyer. He was a member of local branches of three fraternal organizations: the Odd Fellows, the Freemasons, and the Sons of the Republic.

== Death and legacy ==
Samuel Brashear died on September 17, 1941 in his home in Houston. His wife died in December 1940. His closest surviving family members were his son, John, and his sister, Sara McAshan. His tomb was located at Forest Park Abbey in Houston.

== See also ==
- List of mayors of Houston
- Sam Houston Park
- Henry Brashear Building

== Bibliography ==
- Carroll, B.H. (1912). A Standard History of Houston, Texas: From a Study of the Original Sources. Knoxville, TN: H.W. Crew.
- Houghton, Dorothy Knox Howe; Bradley, Barrie Scardino; Howe, Katherine S.; Blackburn, Sadie Gwin (1998). Houston's Forgotten Heritage: Landscapes, Houses, Interiors, 1824–1941 (Second ed.). College Station: Texas A&M University Press. ISBN 978-1-62349-246-5.
- Platt, Harold L. (1983). City Building in the New South: The Growth of Public Services in Houston, Texas, 1830–1910. Philadelphia: Temple University Press. ISBN 0-87722-281-9.
- Turner, Suzanne; Wilson, Joanne Seale (2010). Houston's Silent Garden: Glenwood Cemetery, 1871–2009. College Station: Texas A&M University Press. ISBN 978-1-60344163-6.

Preceded by Horace Baldwin Rice	Mayor of Houston, Texas; 1898–1900	Succeeded by John D. Woolford
