= Andrew Burke =

Andrew Burke may refer to:

- Andrew H. Burke (1850–1918), American politician who served as governor of North Dakota
- Andrew Burke (poet) (1944–2023), Australian poet
- Andrew Burke (sailor) (1949–2009), Barbadian Olympic sailor
- Andrew J. Burke (1813–1903), merchant and mayor of Houston
- Andrew Groves-Burke (born 1967 as Andrew Burke), Welsh badminton player
