= Charlotte Allen =

Charlotte Allen may refer to:

- Charlotte Baldwin Allen (1803–1895), American pioneer; known in Texan history as the "mother of Houston"
- Charlotte Vale-Allen (1941–2023), Canadian writer
