= Horace Baldwin Rice =

American mayor and businessman (1861–1929)

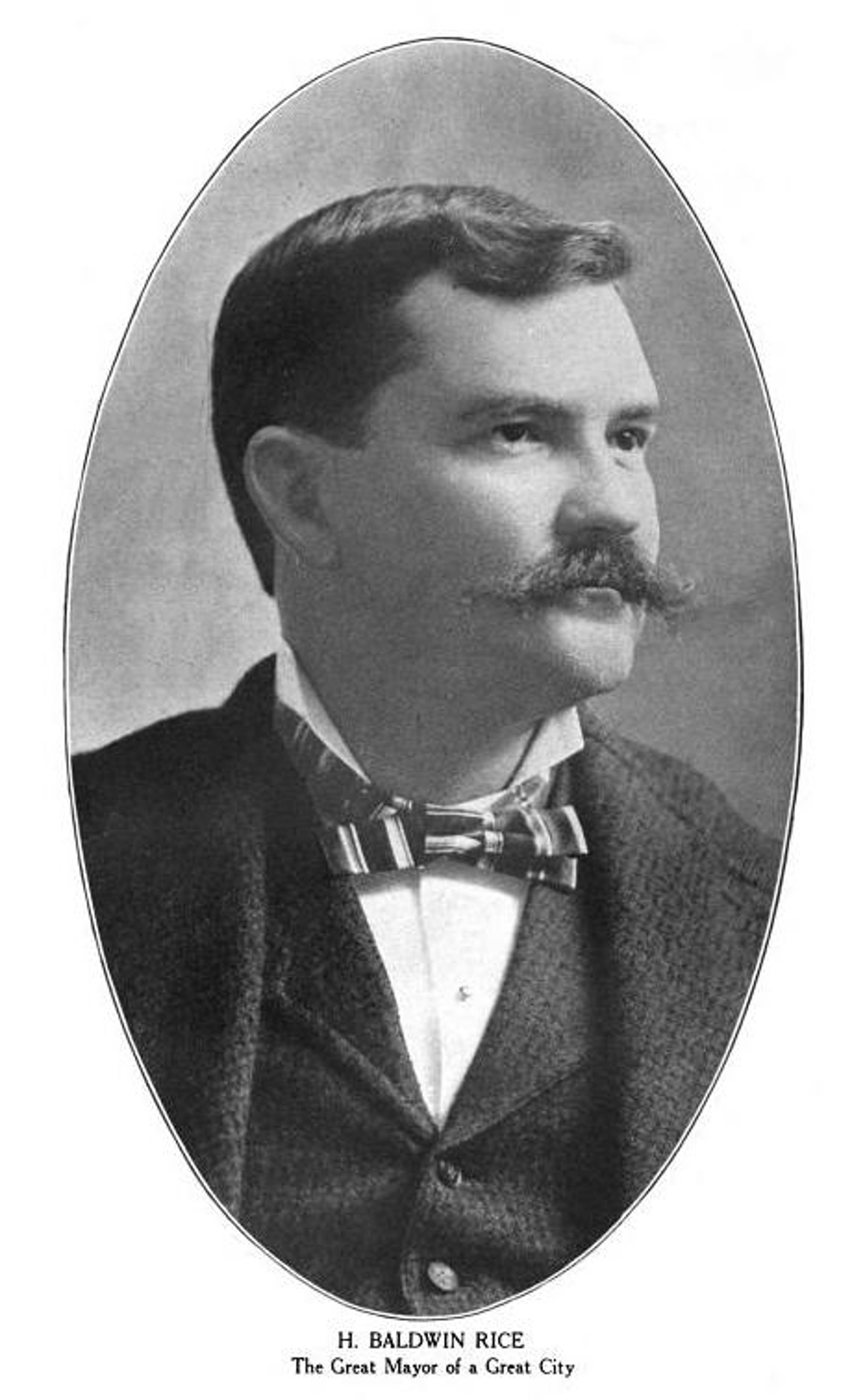

33rd & 38th Mayor of Houston
- In office 1896–1898
- Preceded by: John T. Browne
- Succeeded by: Samuel H. Brashear
- In office 1905–1913
- Preceded by: Andrew L. Jackson
- Succeeded by: Ben Campbell

Harris County Commissioner
- In office 1892–1895

Personal details
- Born: March 29, 1861; Houston, Texas
- Died: August 2, 1929 (aged 68); Morgan's Point, Texas
- Spouse: Georgia Dumble

Horace Baldwin Rice (March 29, 1861 – August 2, 1929) was a businessman and a mayor of Houston, Texas. He was important in the development of the Houston Ship Channel.

== Personal life ==
Horace Baldwin Rice was born March 29, 1861, in Houston, Texas, to Captain Frederick Allen Rice and Charlotte M. Baldwin. He was a maternal grandson of Houston mayor, Horace Baldwin and maternal grandnephew of Charlotte Baldwin Allen. He was the paternal nephew of William Marsh Rice, founder and namesake of Rice University. He attended the Texas Military Institute in Austin, Texas. He married Georgia Dumble in 1883.

== Business and political life ==
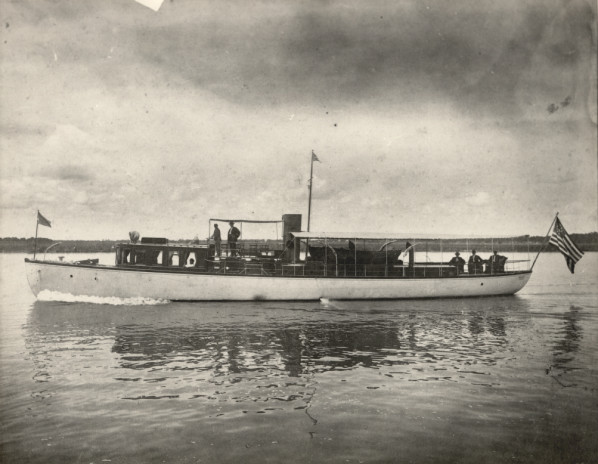
The yacht, the "Zeeland", owned by H. Baldwin Rice, one-time mayor of Houston and nephew of William Marsh Rice.

In the early 1910s, Rice was President of Suburban Homestead Company and Vice-President of the Houston Ice and Brewing Company.

In 1905, Rice was the first mayor of Houston under the commission form of government.

Rice used his yacht, the Zeeland, as a tour boat to promote the Houston Ship Channel project. Thomas Ball, himself a central figure in bringing the Houston Ship Channel to fruition, said of Rice, "It is a well known fact that he used the larger part of his fortune in promoting the interests of the city and the Ship Channel." In 1908, Rice called a meeting of Ship Channel supporters to discuss ideas for expediting the project, even suggesting it should the City of Houston should takeover control. The group voted unanimously for Rice's proposal and elected Ball to take lead over this plan.

When famed anarchist Emma Goldman visited Houston in 1908, Rice invited her to speak at City Hall. While her disapproval of the government caused her to decline, she described the invitation as a sign of "astonishing courtesy."

In January 1909, Rice appointed a committee representing the City of Houston to collaborate with leaders from Beaumont, Texas, who were lobbying Congress for a navigation district. Congress passed a bill that allowed the creation of navigation districts not just for Beaumont, but also for other Texas cities, each contingent on local referendum. In December 1909, Rice led a local delegation to lobby the House Rivers and Harbors Committee for a fifty percent federal grant to support the Houston Ship Channel project.

Harris County sponsored a ballot measure to create the Harris County Houston Ship Channel Navigation District and bonding authority for $1.25 million. On election day, January 10, 1911, Rice declared that businesses close early to allow voters to get to the polls.

Preceded by Andrew L. Jackson	Mayor of Houston, Texas; 1905–1913	Succeeded by Ben Campbell
Preceded by John T. Browne	Mayor of Houston, Texas; 1896–1898	Succeeded by Samuel H. Brashear
