= William Harrison King =

Mayor of Houston, Texas in 1859

William H. King

16th Mayor of Houston
- In office 1859–1860
- Preceded by: Alexander McGowan
- Succeeded by: Thomas W. Whitmarsh

Personal details
- Born: William Harrison King; January 13, 1814 Princess Anne, Maryland, U.S.
- Died: January 8, 1867 (aged 52) Houston, Texas
- Spouse: Mary C. King (m. 1838, death)
- Children: 2

William Harrison King (13 January 1814 to 8 January 1867) was the mayor of Houston, Texas from 1859 to 1860.

== Biography ==
William Harrison King was born on 13 January 1814, in Princess Anne, Maryland. He moved to Texas in 1837 and settled in Caldwell. He was one of the town's first postmasters.

He and his wife, Mary C. King, were the parents of two children — Mary Elizabeth King (1839–1894) and Crockett McDonald King (1841–1897).

He moved to Houston, Texas in 1845. He was the owner of a brickyard. He served as an alderman and the mayor.

He died on 8 January 1867, in Houston, Texas, at the age of 52. He was buried Glenwood Cemetery in Houston. The cemetery's land was previously the location of a brickyard that King owned.

Preceded by Alexander McGowan	Mayor of Houston; 1859-1859	Succeeded by Thomas W. Whitmarsh
