= Glenwood Cemetery (Houston, Texas) =

Cemetery in Texas, United States

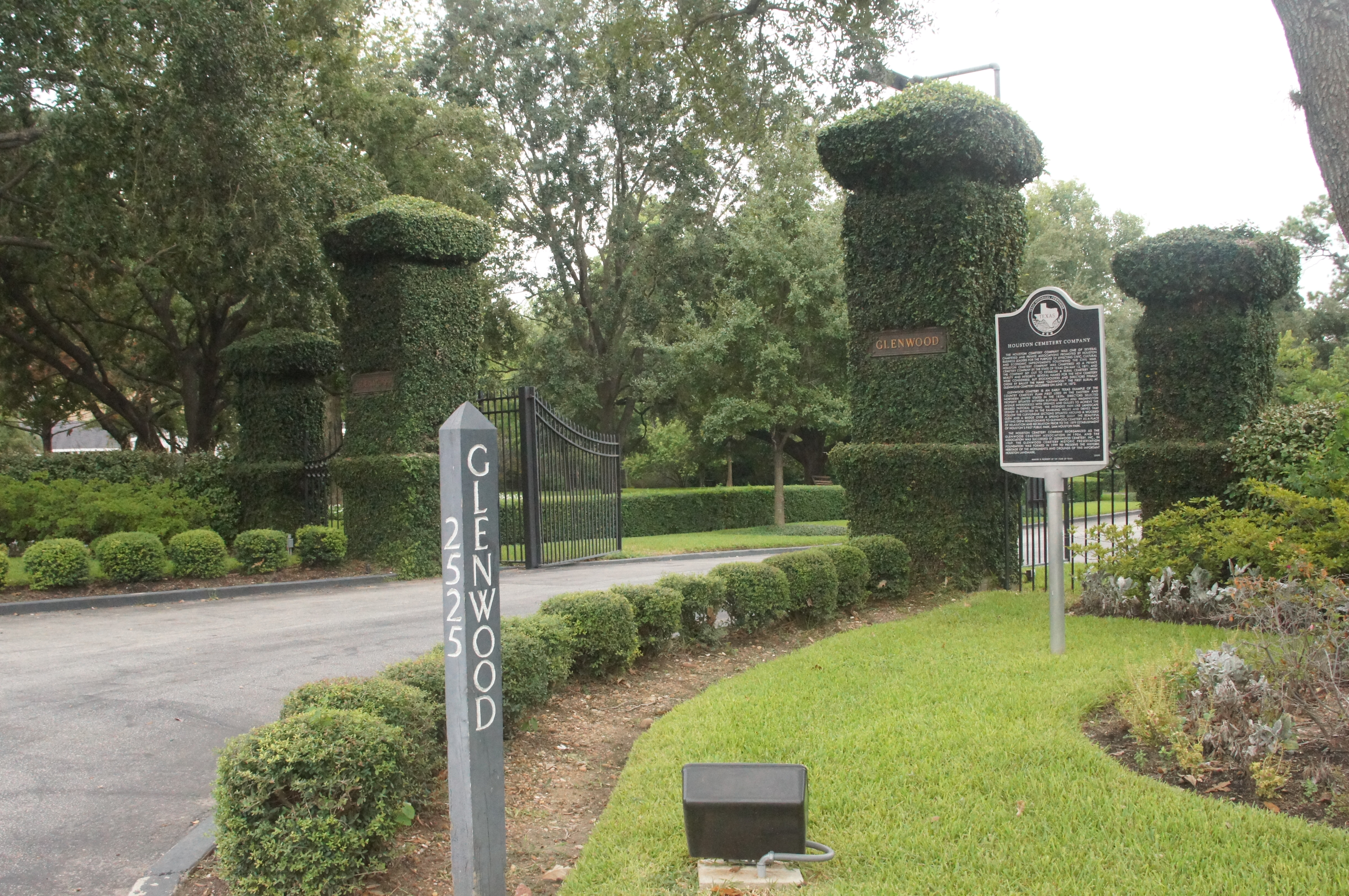
- Main entrance
- Interactive map of Glenwood Cemetery

Details
- Established: 1871
- Location: Houston, Texas
- Country: United States
- Coordinates: 29°45′55″N 95°23′9″W
- Type: Private
- Size: 84 acres (34 ha)
- Website: Official website
- Find a Grave: Glenwood Cemetery

Glenwood Cemetery is located in Houston, Texas, United States. Developed in 1871, the first professionally designed cemetery in the city accepted its first burial in 1872. Its location at Washington Avenue overlooking Buffalo Bayou served as an entertainment attraction in the 1880s. The design was based on principles for garden cemeteries, breaking the pattern of the typical gridiron layouts of most Houston cemeteries. Many influential people lay to rest at Glenwood, making it the "River Oaks of the dead." As of 2018, Glenwood includes the annexed property of the adjacent Washington Cemetery, creating a total area of 84 acres (34 ha) with 18 acres (7.3 ha) still undeveloped.

Notable burials at Glenwood include former residents of the Republic of Texas, some who were re-interred from condemned cemeteries from downtown Houston. Charlotte Allen and William Robinson Baker were early arrivals to Houston, and also long time residents. Baker was one of several interments of former mayors of Houston. The last president of the Republic of Texas, Anson Jones, has a family plot. Former governors of Texas and a former governor of Mississippi lie at rest at the cemetery, as do some high-ranking federal officials. Scions of the oil business include two co-founders of Sharp-Hughes Tools, as well as founders and early investors of Texaco and Humble Oil. The founding president of Rice University, the school's chief architect, and the institute's first trustee are found at Glenwood.

== History ==
Glenwood Cemetery developed on two tracts of land on the north side of Buffalo Bayou, and west of Downtown Houston. Part of this land conveyed from the country estate of Archibald Wynns, a Houston lawyer and Congressman for the Republic of Texas. This tract was later the location of a brickyard, then the property of William Harrison King, who served as mayor of Houston. Glenwood Cemetery purchased the property and some adjacent land in the Hollingsworth Survey in 1870. Alfred Whitaker gained a charter to incorporate the Houston Cemetery Company. He owned his own landscaping company and used his expertise to clear out lots, lay out and grade right of ways, and otherwise beautify the landscape. Glenwood hosted its first burial on June 19, 1872. Many remains were reinterred at Glenwood after the condemnations of St. Vincent's and the Episcopal cemeteries. Glenwood obtained its state charter as the Houston Cemetery Company, starting as for-profit institution, the first state charter for a cemetery. About 25 years later, the Houston Cemetery Company changed its status to non-profit.

By 1874, Glenwood was a recreational destination. A mule-drawn street railway operated on Washington Road, conveying people to Glenwood for weekend and holiday visits. Upgrades and expansions to the street railways were both a response to demand for travel to the cemetery and a cause of it. Glenwood remained popular for about twenty years. A group led by W. D. Cleveland criticized the conditions of lots and roads in 1896 and asked for a receivership to manage Glenwood. Two court decisions resulted in a transfer of management to William Christian. Glenwood underwent reorganization in 1904, and more recently was reorganized as the non-profit Glenwood Cemetery, Incorporated in 1969. A separate organization, the Glenwood Cemetery Historic Preservation Foundation, started overseeing historic preservation of the property in 1999. The same year Glenwood acquired the adjacent Washington Cemetery, expanding its land area by 118 acres (48 ha).

Keith Rosen, a Houston area history professor quoted in the San Antonio Express-News, said that the cemetery is the "River Oaks of the dead." In 2003 the Houston Press ranked it as the "Best Cemetery".

== General characteristics ==
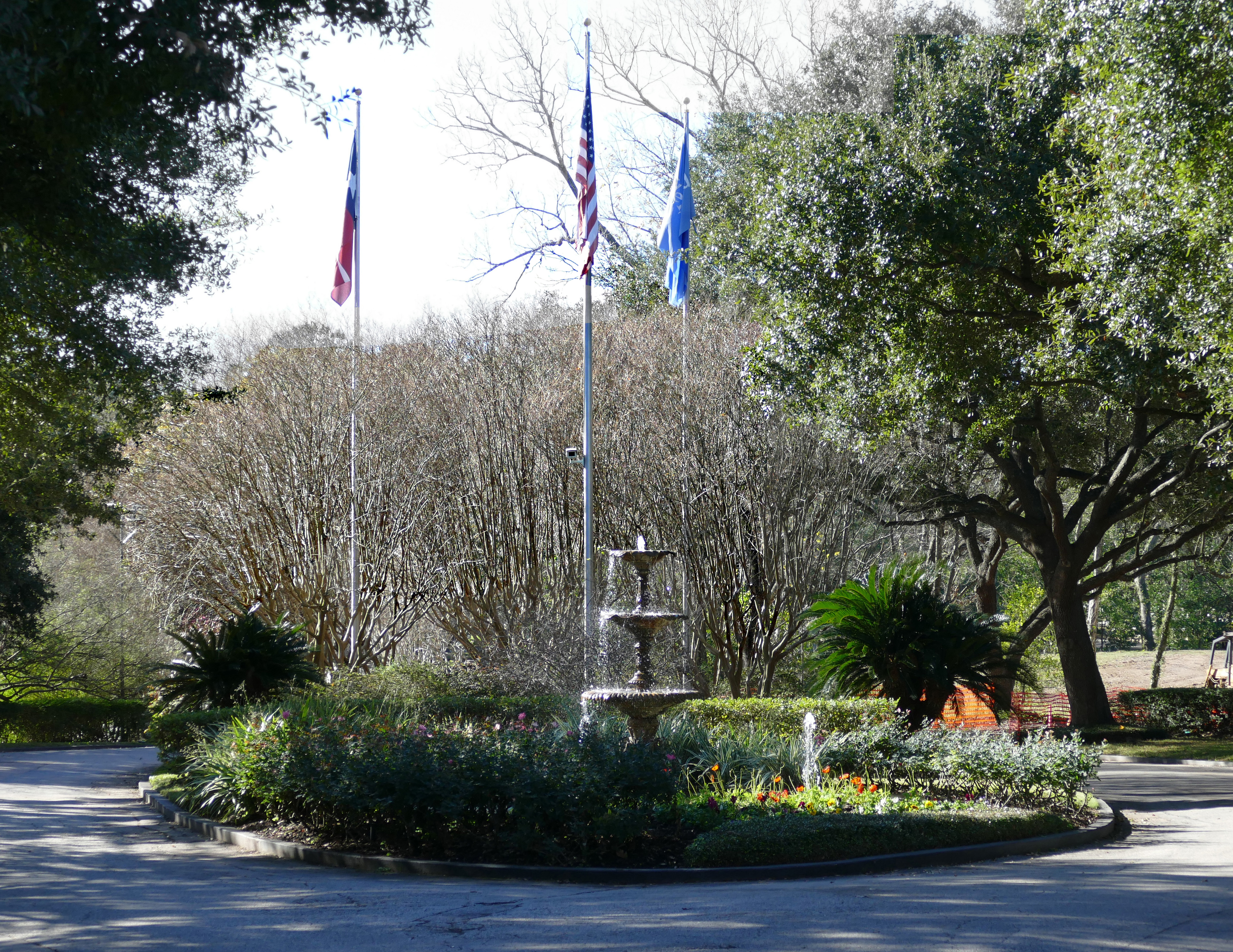
Fountain, just as you enter Houston's Glenwood Cemetery

Glenwood Cemetery is located on the northern bank of Buffalo Bayou, and bounded by Washington Avenue to the north. Parts of the property afford views of the downtown Houston skyline, of Memorial Drive, and of Allen Parkway. The grounds are shaded by numerous hardwoods, and the bluffs are cut by deep ravines leading to the bayou. The grounds have formal landscaping, and a diversity of statues and monuments. The property covers 84 acres (34 ha), with 18 acres (7.3 ha) still undeveloped as of 2018.

According to architectural historian Stephen Fox, many of Houston's earlier cemeteries featured a gridiron arrangement of grave sites, following a pattern of urban cemeteries. Glenwood did not employ a gridiron arrangement, and even many of Glenwood's successors retained the old manner of urban cemetery design.

== Notable burials ==
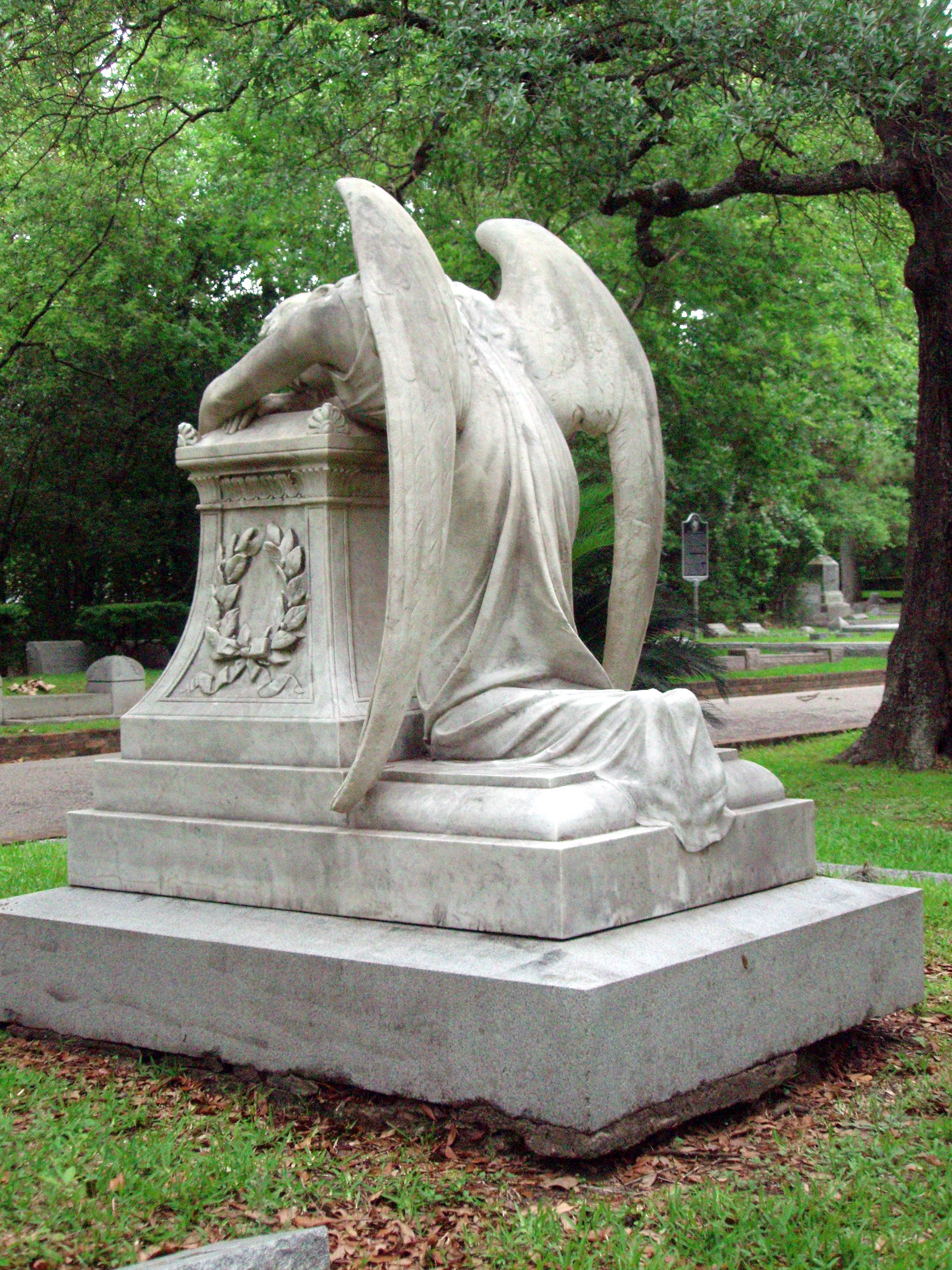
Sample of the monument architecture in Glenwood – this statue is commonly known as the Angel of Grief

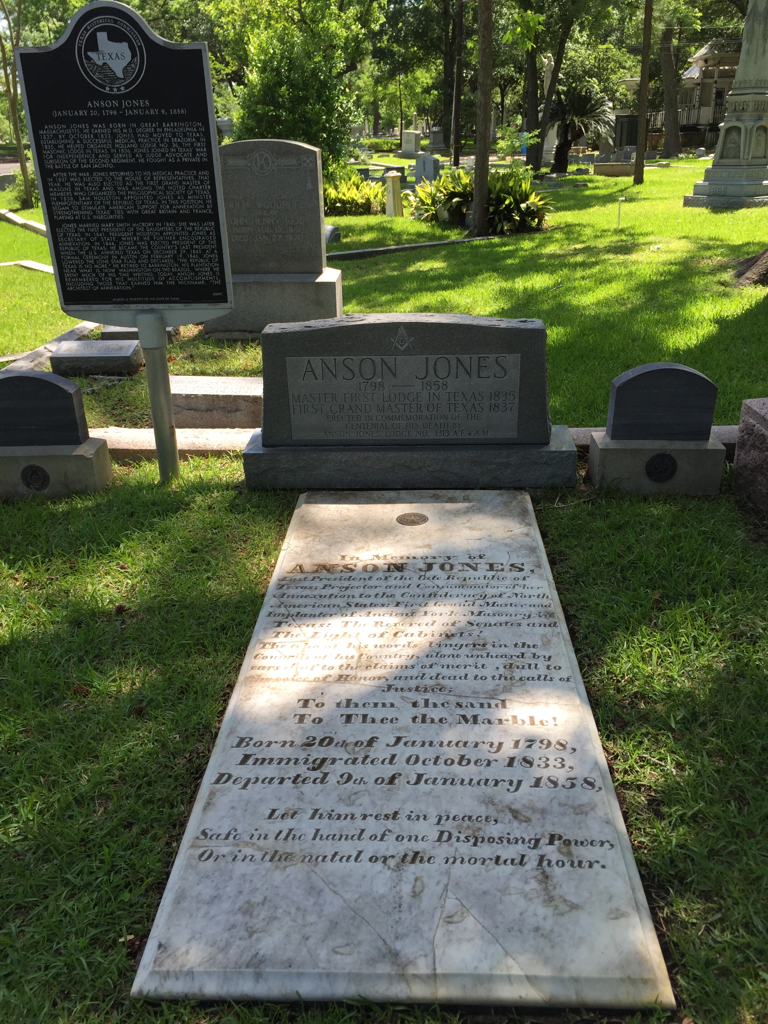
Gravesite and historical marker for Anson Jones, last president of the Texas Republic

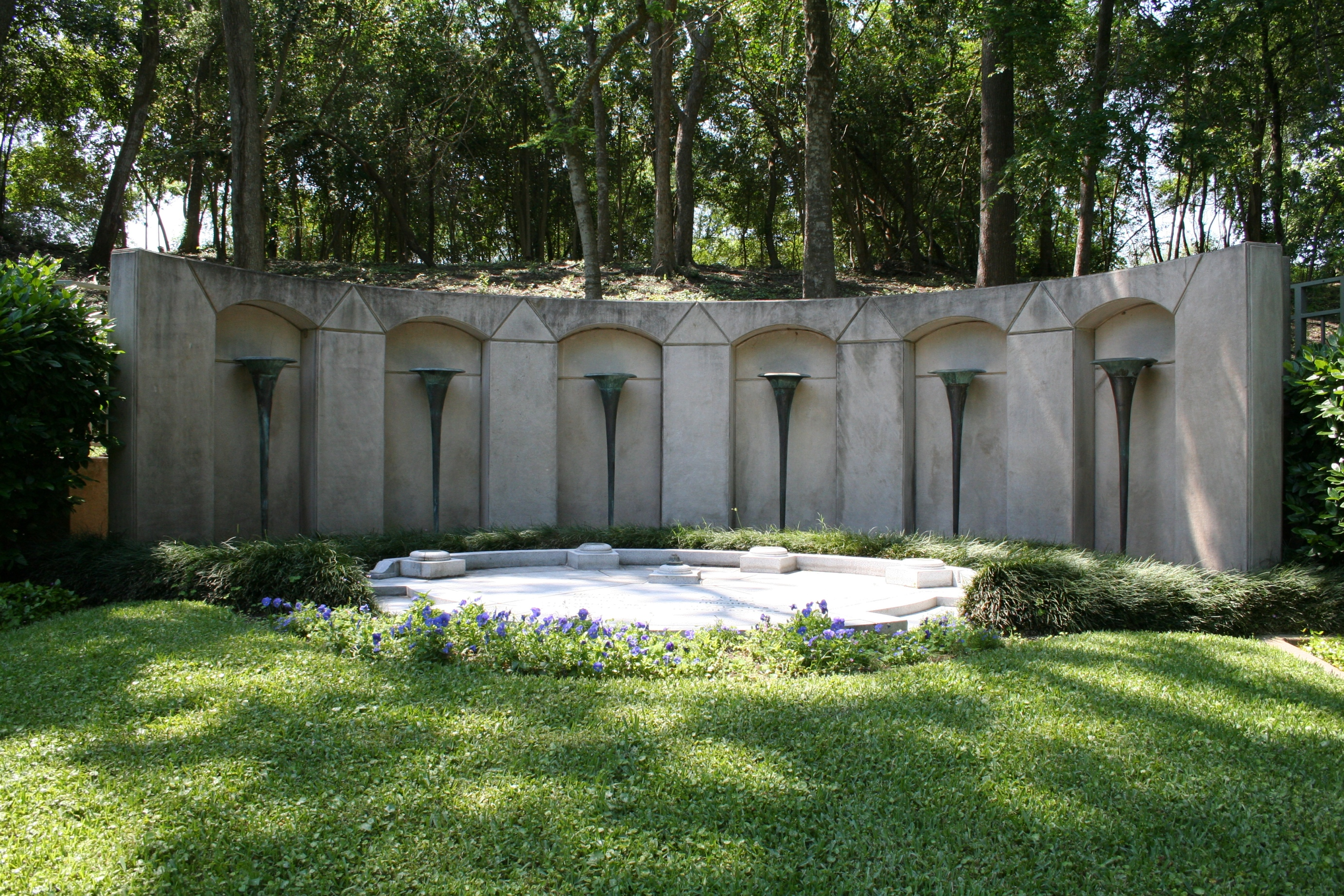
Gravesite of Howard Hughes and his parents at Glenwood Cemetery

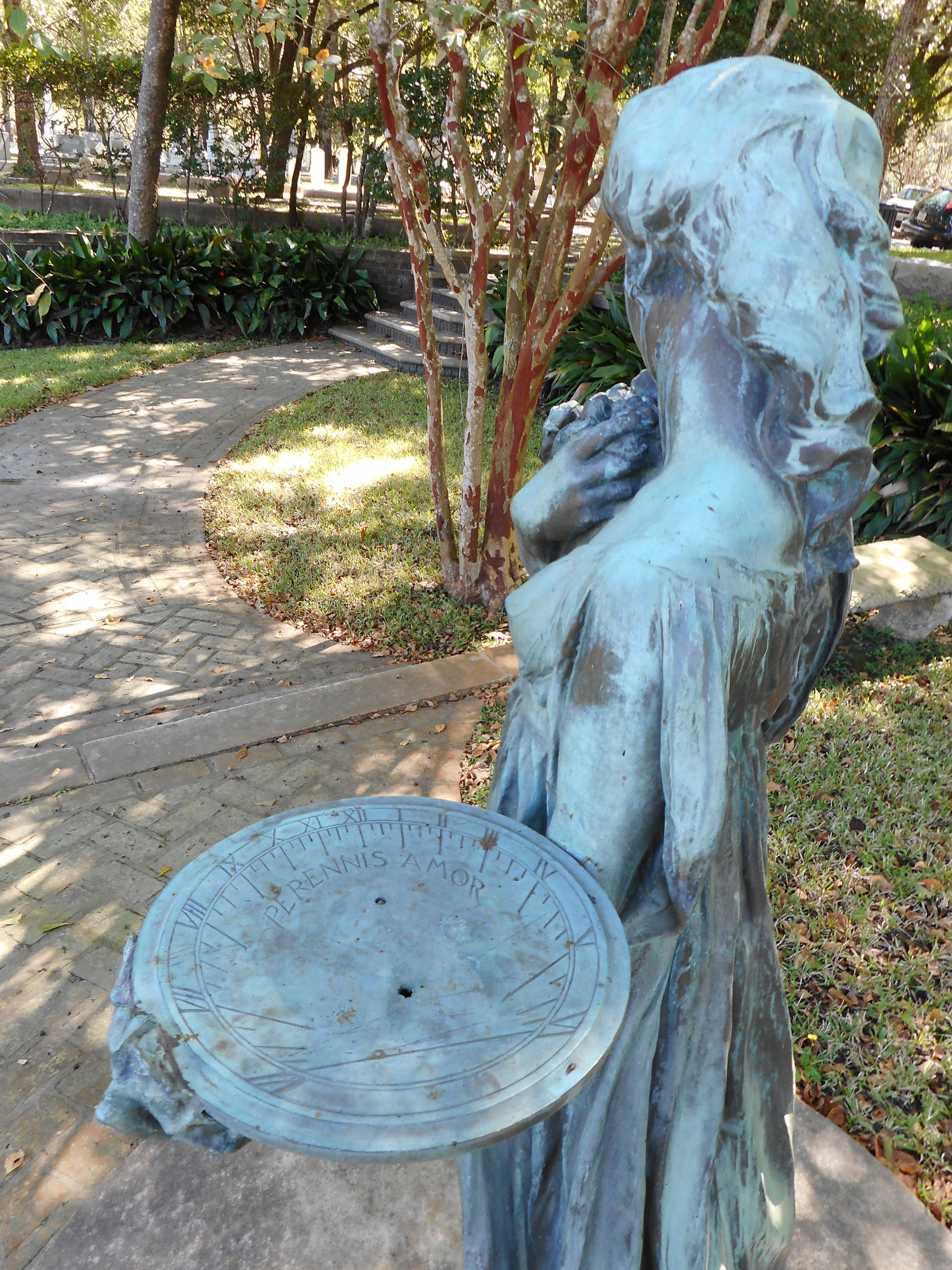
Sharp family plot, sculpture of human figure holding a sundial, inscribed "perennis amor"

This historic cemetery is the final resting place of a number of individuals who were citizens of the short-lived Republic of Texas. The grave sites of those individuals have been designated with metal markers and are frequently decorated with the flag of the Republic and State of Texas. Charlotte Baldwin Allen, wife of Augustus Chapman Allen, founder City of Houston, has her grave marked by a large monument. Charlotte's brother, Horace Baldwin, was a mayor during the Republic; and her daughter, Eliza Allen Converse, was touted as "the first child born in Houston." Another early arrival to Houston was William Robinson Baker, who worked for the Houston Town Company starting in 1837. He was later a Houston mayor. He is buried next to his wife, Hestor Eleanor Runnels. Other citizens of the Texas Republic were Hiram Runnels, a former Governor of Mississippi (1833–1835), and James Wilson Henderson, who served as Governor of Texas in 1853. Anson Jones, the last president of the Republic of Texas, committed suicide at the Capitol Hotel and is buried here. His wife, Mary Smith Jones, the first lady of the Republic of Texas, died on December 31, 1907, and is buried at Glenwood Cemetery.

Two Reconstruction mayors are interred at Glenwood: Joseph Robert Morris and Thomas Howe Scanlan. John T. Browne was mayor of Houston from 1897 to 1899 and member of Texas House of Representatives. Another mayor buried at Glenwood is Joseph Chappell Hutcheson, Jr., who also served as a federal judge. His father, Joseph Chappell Hutcheson, was a member of the Texas House of Representatives and United States House of Representatives from Texas's 1st congressional district. Houston lawyer and politician Thad Hutcheson represents a third generation of his family at Glenwood. Roy Hofheinz, Harris County Judge, Mayor of Houston, and developer of the Astrodome, is interred at Glenwood.

Albert Bel Fay, U.S. Ambassador to Trinidad and Tobago is interred at Glenwood. Edward M. House, best known by his honorary title Colonel House, was an important adviser to President Woodrow Wilson. House was the son of Thomas William House Sr. Buried in the cemetery is William P. Hobby, former Texas Governor, after whom Hobby Airport in Houston, Texas, is named. Oveta Culp Hobby served as the Secretary of Department of Health, Education and Welfare (1953–1955).

Another Texas governor at Glenwood, Ross S. Sterling (1931–1933), was co-founder of Humble Oil Company, along with William Stamps Farish II and Harry C. Wiess. A Texaco founder Joseph S. Cullinan resides there, as with independent oil producer and philanthropist, George H. Hermann, Houston business leader, and "King of the Wildcatters," Glenn McCarthy. With McCarthy, Harry H. Lee, William Howard Lee, and film star Gene Tierney Lee are all buried in a family plot. An early developer of the Indonesian gas, Roy M. Huffington, also served as US Ambassador to Austria.

Walter Benona Sharp, whose innovations in mud drilling led to development of the Spindletop field, has a family plot at Glenwood. He co-founded Sharp-Hughes Tool Company aka Hughes Tool Company, with Howard R. Hughes, Sr., who is also interred at Glenwood. The younger Howard R. Hughes, Jr, the aviator and industrialist, is also buried at the family plot and memorial. Another associate of Humble Oil, Florence M. Sterling, is buried at Glenwood. She was also an advocate for women's rights. Annette Finnigan was a suffragette, philanthropist, and arts patron. Buried here is Edward F. Simms, a native of Kentucky who was an American lawyer, oil industrialist, and owner and breeder of Thoroughbred racehorses about whom a Houston Post obituary said that his career was "a saga of American accomplishment." Buried here, Edwin B. Parker, lawyer of Houston and member of the War Industries Board and arbiter with Germany, Austria and Hungary following World War I.

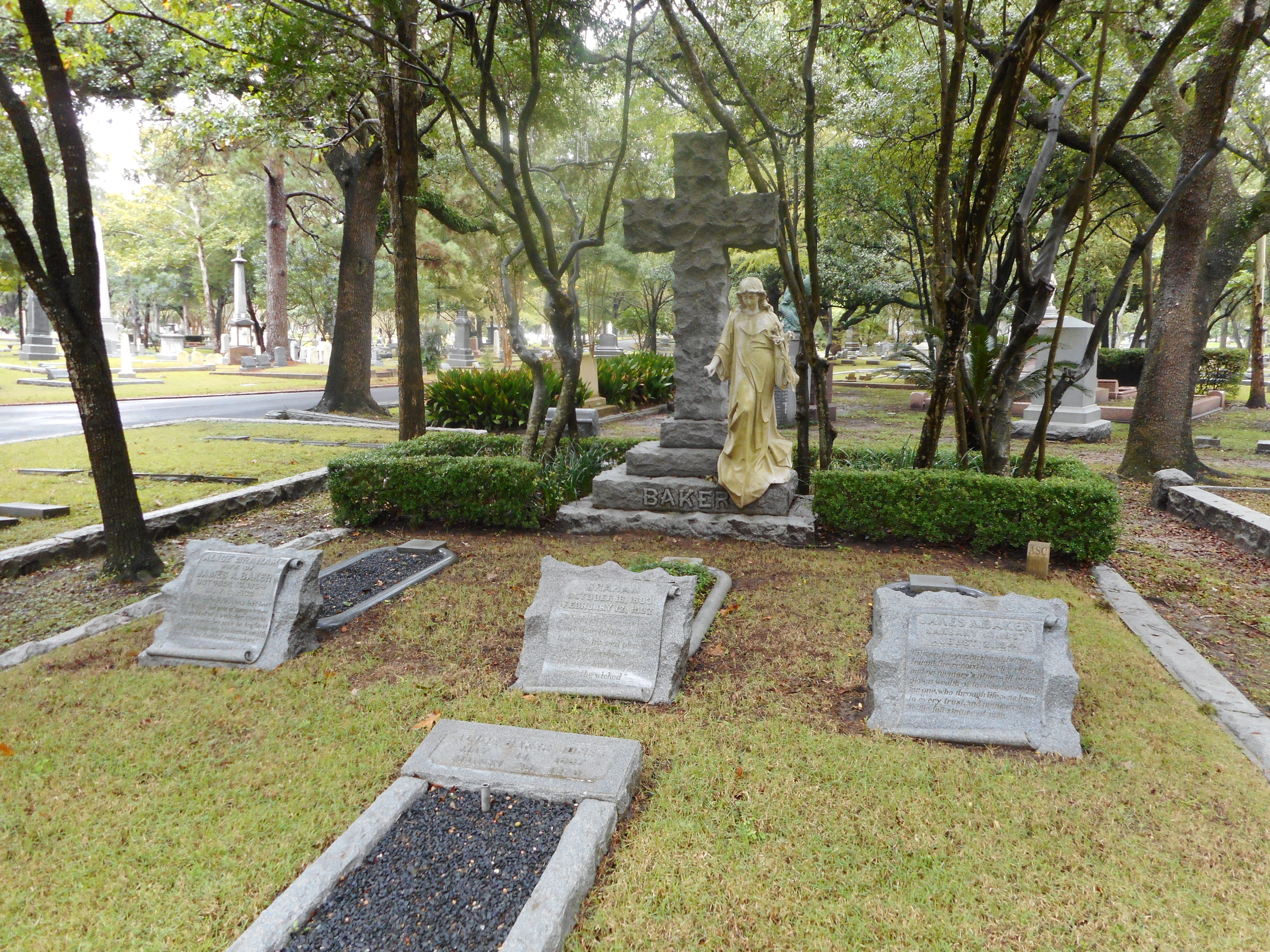
The family gravesite of Captain James A. Baker: Alice Graham Baker (left) and Captain James A. Baker (right).

Edgar Odell Lovett was the first president Rice University (1912–1946) and is at rest at Glenwood. William Ward Watkin was the project manager for the construction of the original buildings on the Rice Campus. Captain James A. Baker was the personal attorney of William Marsh Rice. He protected the interests of the Rice Endowment and was a trustee of the university for fifty years. He was also a trustee of Glenwood Cemetery. Alice Graham Baker was the founder of the Houston Settlement Association. Adele Briscoe Looscan was a president of the Texas State Historical Association and the grand daughter of the namesake of Harris County, Texas. Margaret Kinkaid was the founder of The Kinkaid School, which she opened on Elgin Street in 1899.

This is also the location of pioneering heart surgeon Denton Cooley's family gravesite. Cooley's grandfather, Daniel Denton Cooley, developed the Houston Heights subdivision. Denton Cooley died November 18, 2016 and is buried at Glenwood.

Anne McCormick Sullivan was a firefighter who died in the 2013 Southwest Inn fire. Stacy Barnett and John Goosey were murder victims.

== Gallery ==
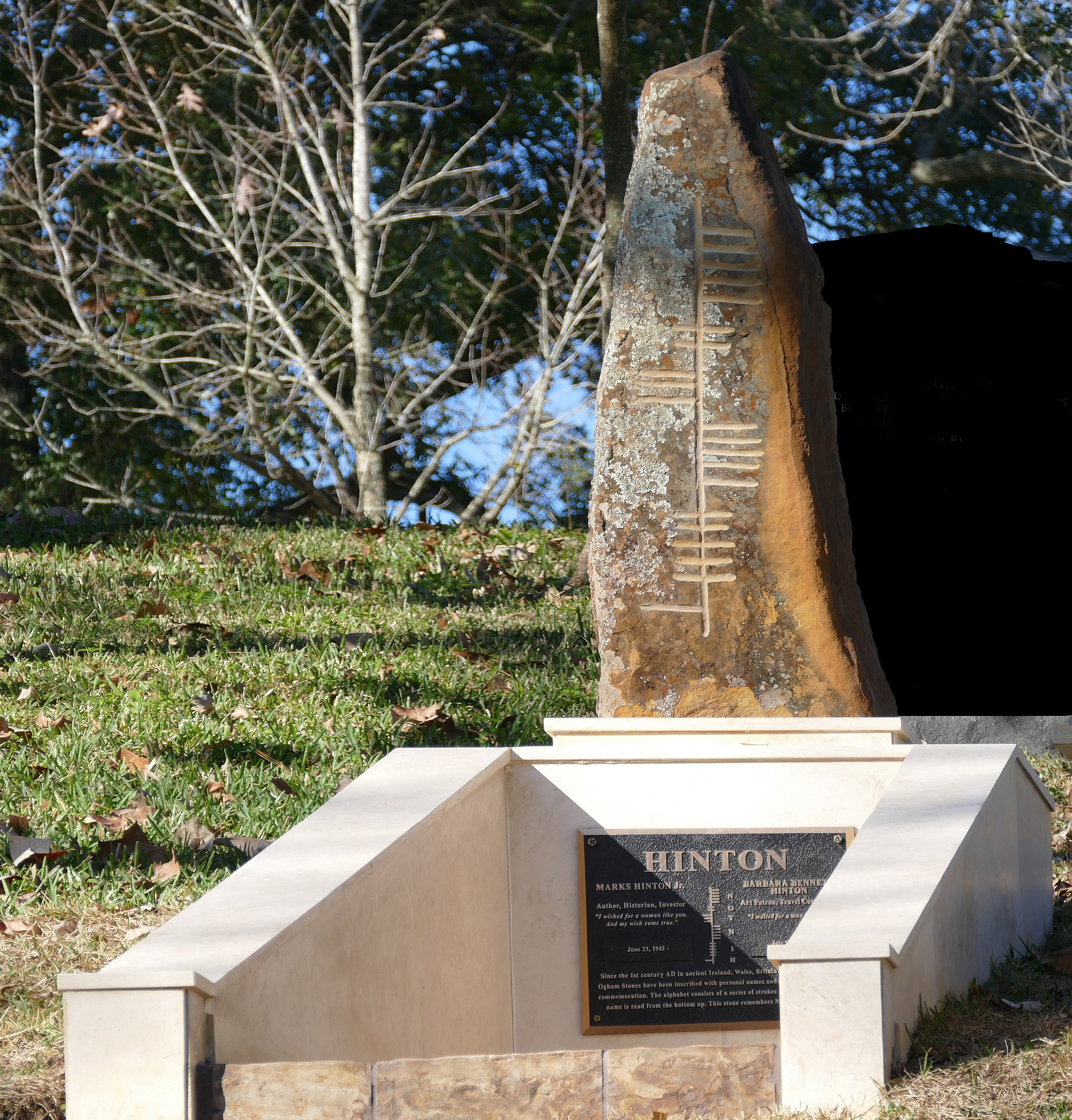
Ogham Stone Headstone in Glenwood

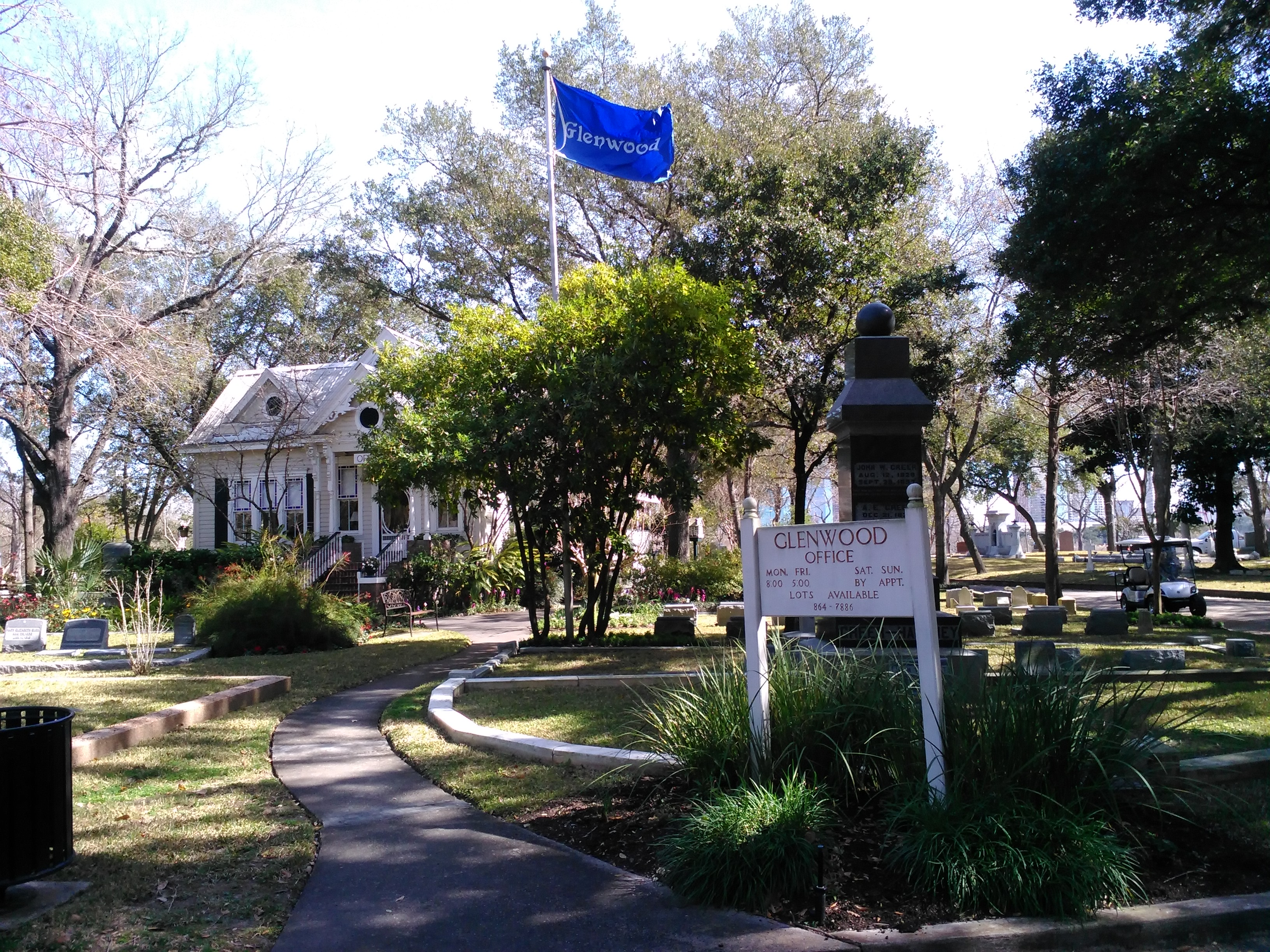
Garden and office at Glenwood

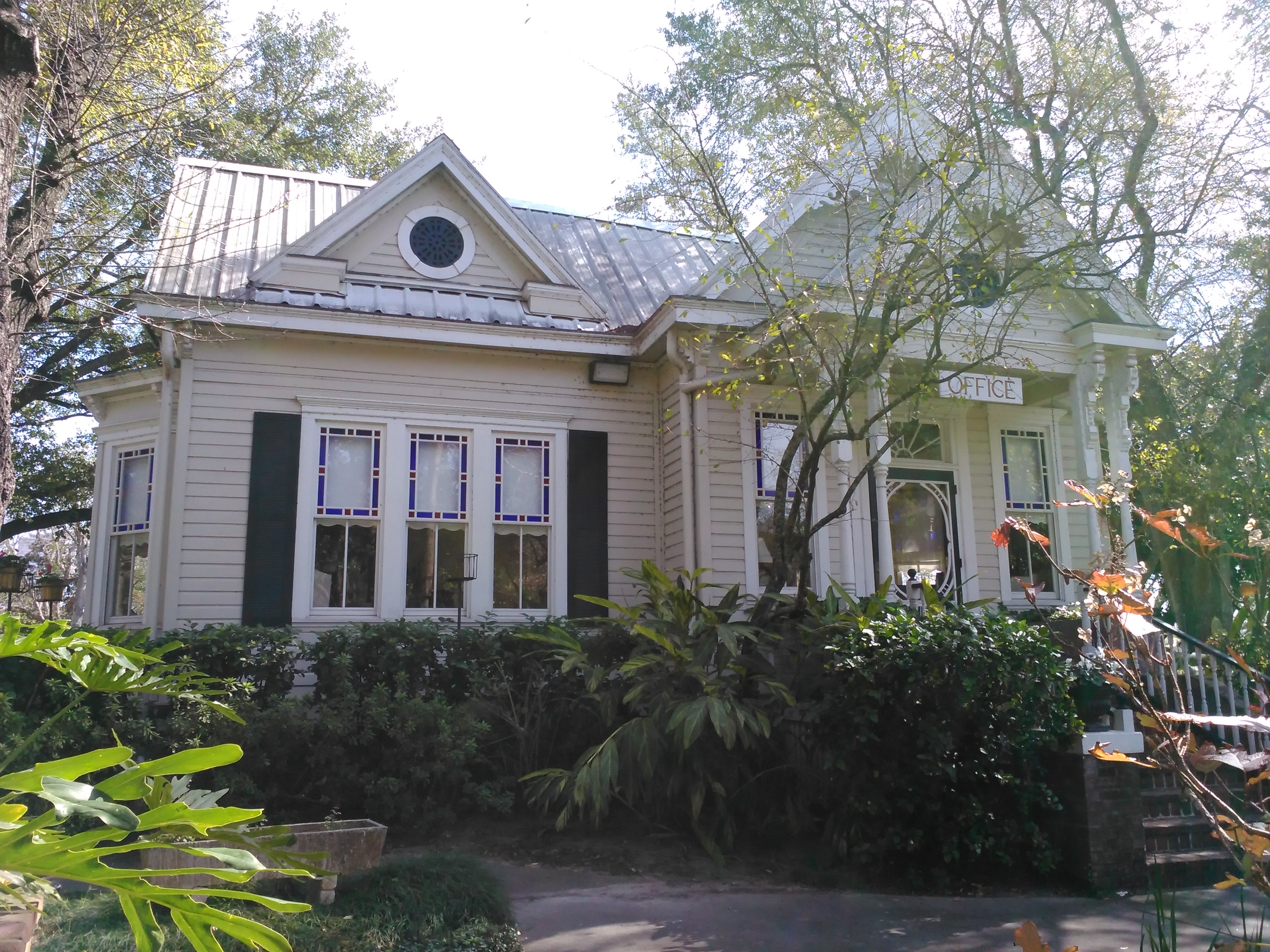
Office at Glenwood

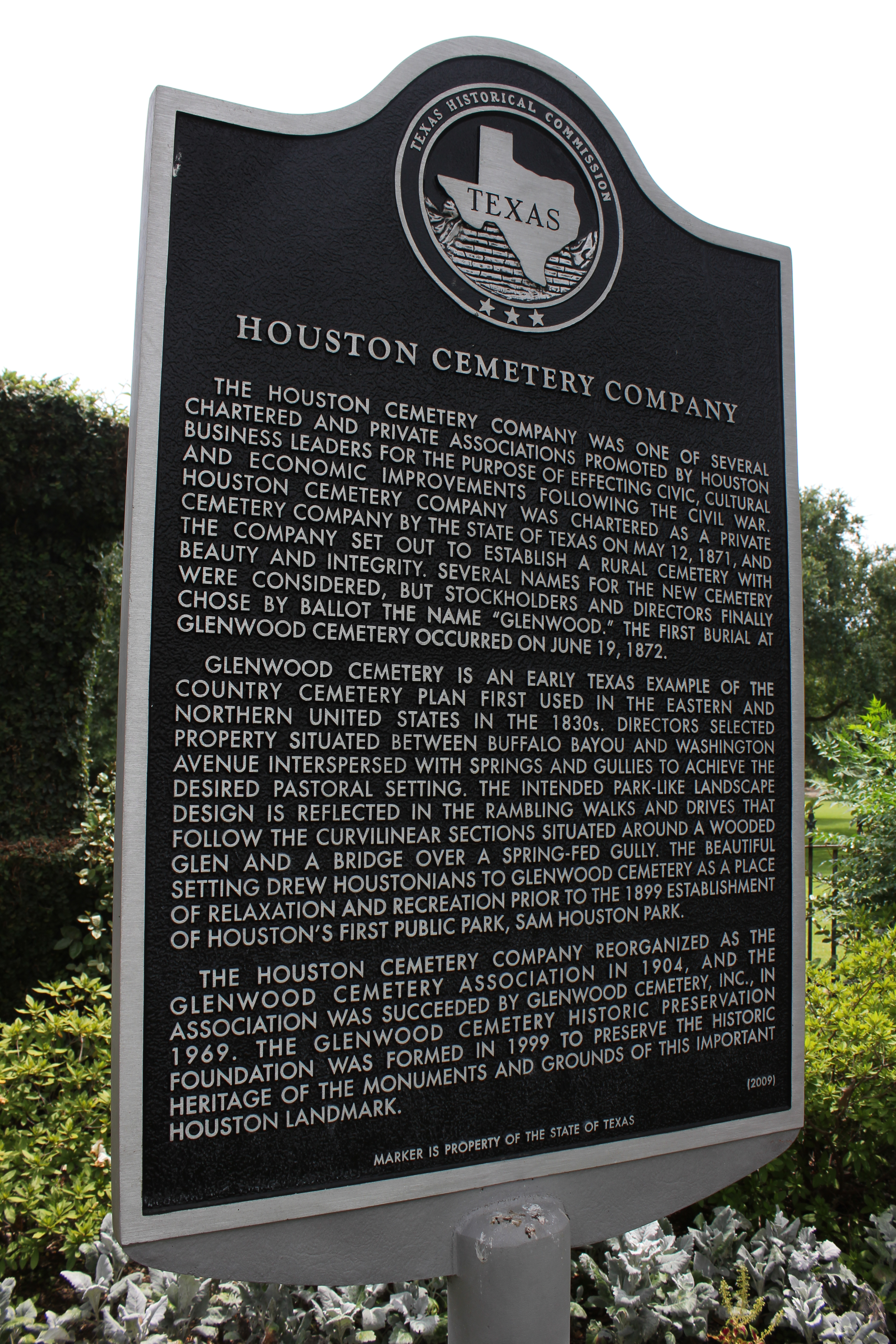
Texas Historical Marker for Glenwood

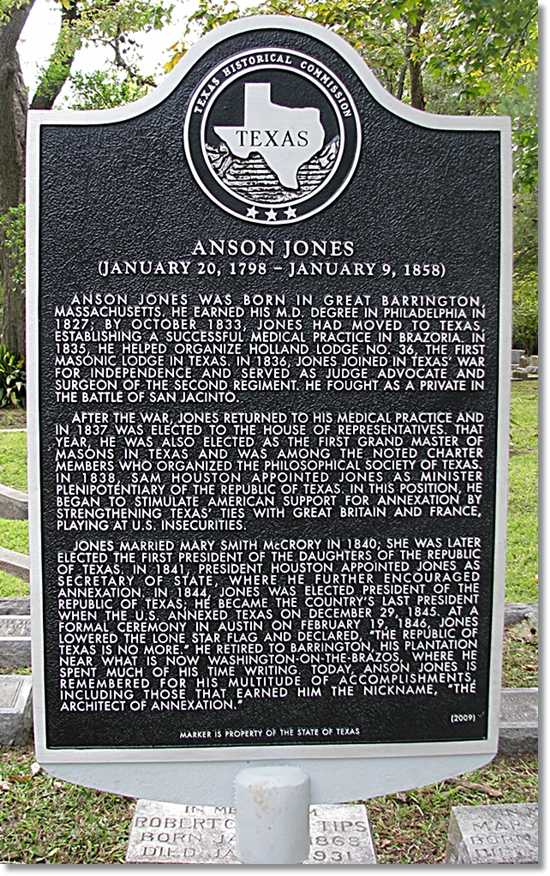
Texas Historical Marker for Anson Jones

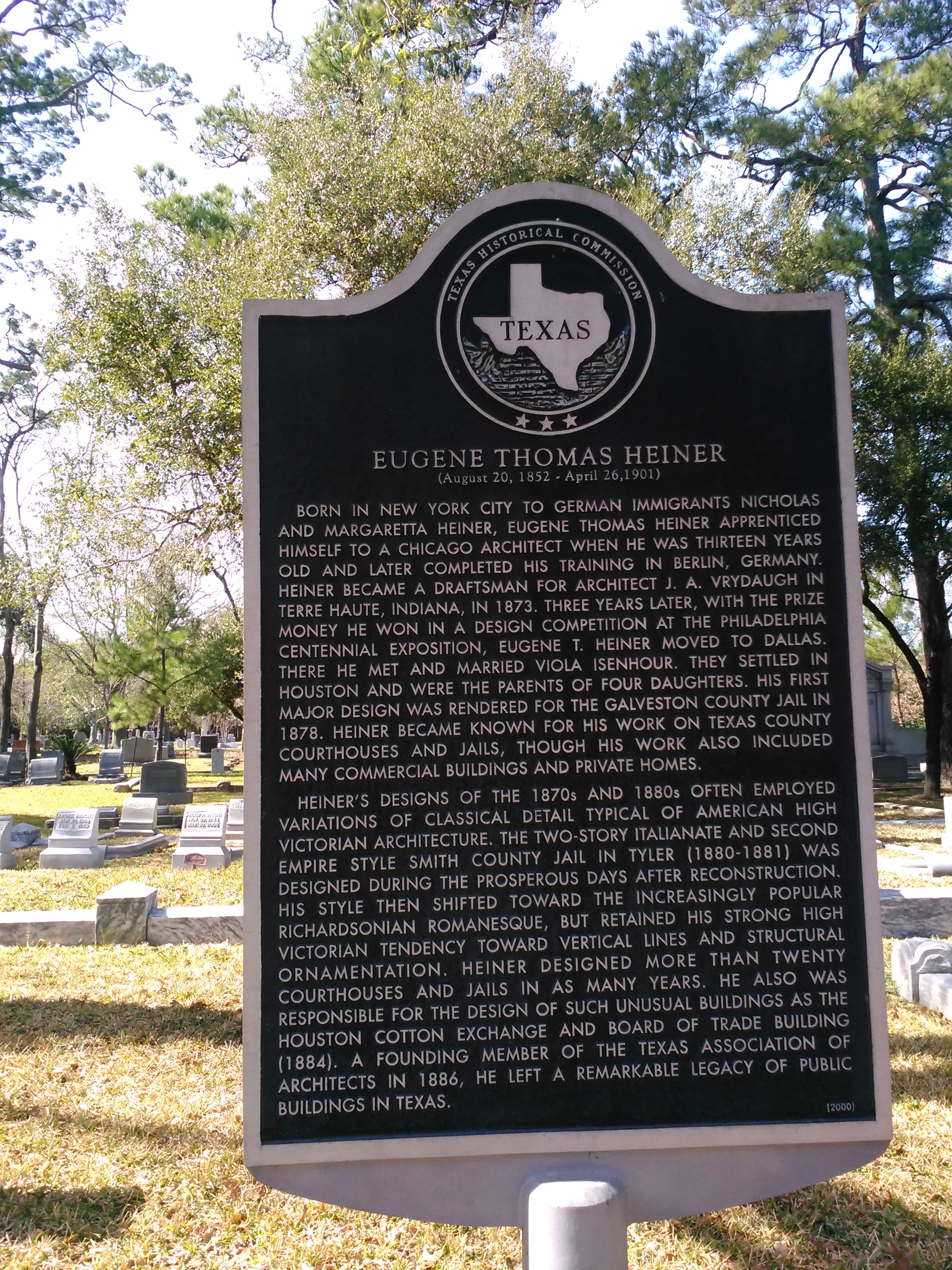
Texas Historical Maker for Eugene Heiner

== Bibliography ==
- Aulbach, Louis F. (2012). Buffalo Bayou: An echo of Houston's wilderness beginnings. Houston: Louis F. Aulbach. pp. 193–195. ISBN 978-1468101997.
- Kirkland, Kate Sayen (2012). Captain James A. Baker of Houston, 1857–1941. College Station: Texas A & M University Press. ISBN 978-1603448000.
- Turner, Suzanne and Joanne Seale Wilson (2010). Houston's Silent Garden: Glenwood Cemetery, 1871–2009. College Station: Texas A&M University Press. p. 170. ISBN 978-1603441636.
