= 1879 Houston Waterworks =

- U.S. National Register of Historic Places
- Texas State Antiquities Landmark
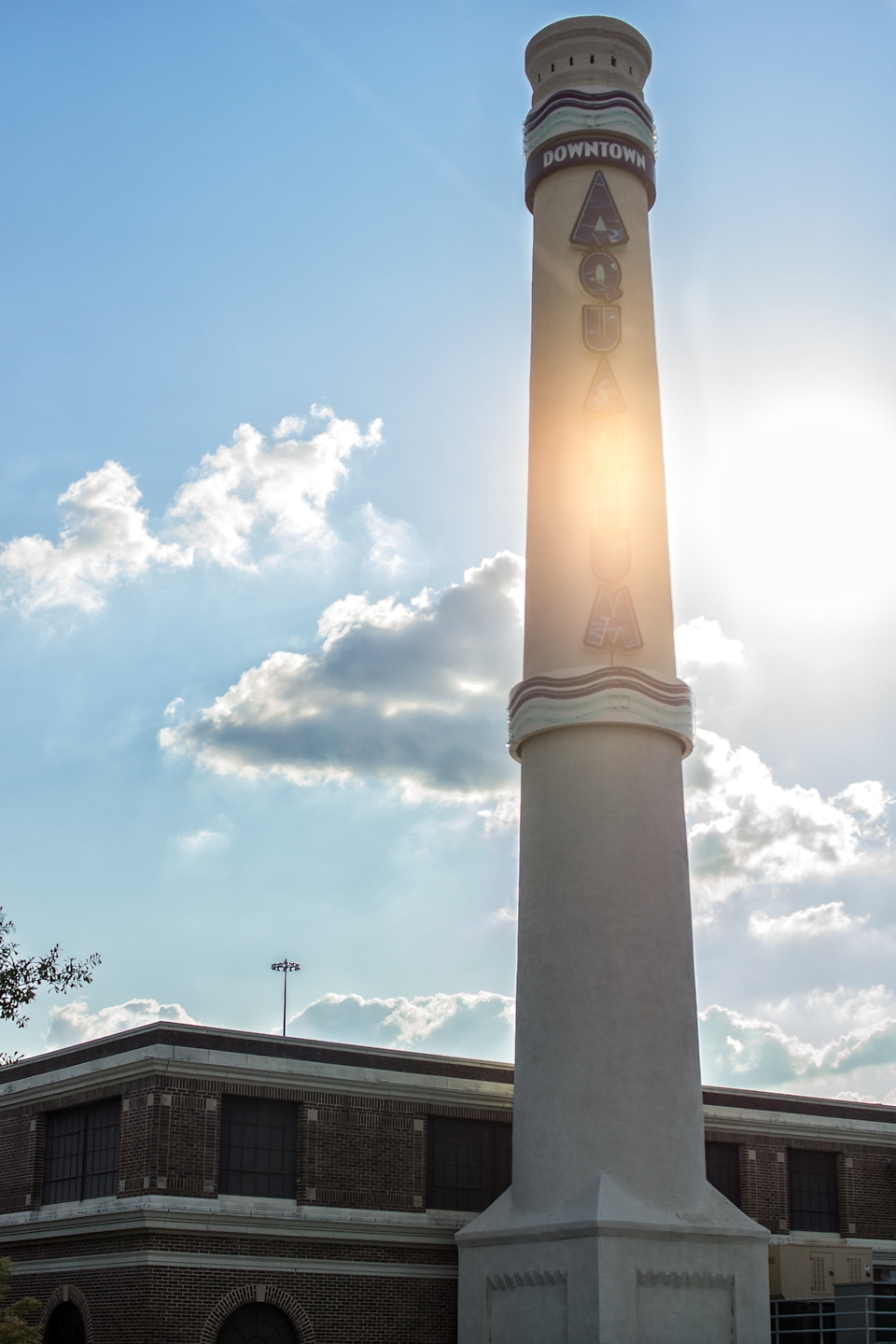

- Location within Texas Location within the United States
- Location: 27 Artesian St., Houston, Texas
- Coordinates: 29°45′50″N 95°22′10″W
- Area: 0.1 acres (0.040 ha)
- Built: 1879
- Architect: Houston Waterworks Co.
- NRHP reference No.: 76002037
- TSAL No.: 324

Significant dates
- Added to NRHP: May 6, 1976
- Designated TSAL: 5/28/1981

1879 Houston Waterworks is a building located in Houston, Texas listed on the National Register of Historic Places.

== History ==
The Houston Water Works Company was established by a group of New York investors and entered a franchise agreement with the city of Houston in 1878. The company constructed a dam just upstream from Capitol Avenue, a processing plant on Artesian Street, and connected pipes to the city system. The Houston Waterworks Company pumped about 2 million gallons of water from the Buffalo Bayou daily when it was founded in 1879 to extinguish fires, such as the one that broke out on Main Street a few days after the plant was erected. After natural reserves of drinking water were discovered in Houston, the Waterworks company out-competed local wells.

T. H. Scanlan and Associates acquired the Houston Water Works Company and its franchise in 1884. New ownership made capital improvements — including a new boiler, pumps, and a reservoir — increasing the daily capacity to eight million gallons. Even these improvements were not sufficient to provide enough pressure to every point in the city, and sometimes the system failed at extinguishing fires. In 1887 a new well at Franklin and LaBranch revealed a large natural reservoir, and a total of fourteen wells were added by 1891.

The city took over the plant in the early 20th century when it found that the Houston Water Works was mixing bayou water into the drinking supply. In 1903, one water pipe was obstructed by a three-foot eel. Three years later, a broken water main gushed water with a supply of catfish. Both events elicited jokes about how the Houston artesian wells were home to schools of eel and catfish. Mayor Horace Baldwin Rice and Houston City Council studied the inventory of Houston infrastructure and concluded that it was inadequate to provide for the needs of its residents. The city assumed control of the Water Works by purchasing the system from Thomas Howe Scanlan's partnership for about $900,000. In addition to the water plant, the city acquired the system's 65 miles of water mains and its 55 wells.

== Preserved site ==
In 1975, few remains of this facility were extant. There was a masonry reservoir with a concrete cover and some possible remains of the foundation for the old pump house. These are located on the same grounds as the 1926 Bayou Pumping Station.

== See also ==
- National Register of Historic Places listings in Harris County, Texas
