= Horace D. Taylor =

American entrepreneur and mayor of Houston, Texas

Horace Dickinson Taylor

21st Mayor of Houston
- In office 1866–1866
- Preceded by: William Anders
- Succeeded by: Alexander McGowan

Personal details
- Born: c. 1821 Massachusetts, U.S.
- Died: November 9, 1890 Houston, Texas, U.S.
- Spouse: Emily Baker (m. 1852)
- Profession: Businessman

Horace Dickinson Taylor (c. 1821 – November 9, 1890) was a commission merchant and a mayor of Houston, Texas.

== Early life ==
Horace Dickinson Taylor was born in Massachusetts around 1821. His mother was Mary Taylor, and his father was the Reverend James Taylor, who presided over a parish in Sunderland, Massachusetts. His parents were cousins. Horace had five sisters and three brothers. James Taylor was the minister of the Congregational church and a farmer. He organized a temperance club to address the local problem of drunkenness. Taylor's parents died of typhus when he was ten years old. By 1835, fourteen-year-old Horace was residing in the home of Mr. Delano, the postmaster and magistrate for Sunderland. Three of the other youngest Taylor children lived in the Delano household.

In 1836, Horace and his brother Alfred moved to Charleston, South Carolina, where his older brother James worked as a mercantile warehouse. James hired the two boys as apprentices. Another older brother of Horace, Edward, also joined them in Charleston. Edward soon moved on to Houston.

== Career ==
Horace left Charleston, enticed by opportunities working with his brother Edward in Houston. He arrived in 1838. Edward set up a store in Independence, Texas, but Horace opted to stay in Houston and hired on with Thomas Whitmarsh, a commission merchant on Commerce Avenue in Houston.

Edward Taylor, who had returned to establish a cotton factor business in Houston, gave up his business to join William Marsh Rice and E. B. Nichols. Edward sold this company to Horace in 1851. The next year, Horace married Emily Baker, sister of William Robinson Baker. Horace had been renting the warehouse at Travis and Commerce, and purchased the building in 1853. Since location was just a short walk from the steamboat landing, it was convenient to newcomers, many of whom stored their personal property in the warehouse as they scouted Texas for opportunities. His dealings with these immigrants provided connections to potential customers for his cotton factoring business. He also provided an amenity to people visiting from the hinterlands. His large homestead on Buffalo Bayou overlooking the main bridge leading into Houston served as a free campground for visiting farmers.

In 1859, Taylor formed a partnership with Thomas M. Bagby. By then several railroads had been completed to Houston, and these facilitated a greater volume of incoming cotton for storage and processing. Though Taylor attempted to enlist with the Confederacy at the outbreak of the Civil War, he was disqualified from service due to a lung condition. He paid for a substitute to take his place. In 1866, he was elected as mayor of Houston and served a single one-year term. His priority was the condition of the streets, which suffered from lack of care during the war. He proposed to clean them and resurface them with a fresh layer of oyster shells. City council approved this measure without dissent and supported an innovation to Houston: the city installed street signs for the first time. The Taylor administration also oversaw the improvement of drainage on lower Caroline Street, where they installed a culvert to replace the gully that was older than Houston itself.

Political offices
Preceded by William Anders	Mayor of Houston, Texas; 1866	Succeeded by Alexander McGowan
