= Irvin Capers Lord =

Industrialist and mayor of Houston

Mayor of Houston
- In office 1876–1876
- Preceded by: James T.D. Wilson
- Succeeded by: James T.D. Wilson

Personal details
- Born: November 26, 1827 Charleston, South Carolina, U.S.
- Died: September 23, 1914 (aged 86) Houston, Texas, U.S.
- Spouse: Emeline Seddons
- Children: Sixteen
- Profession: machinist, industrialist

Irvin Capers Lord (November 23, 1827 – September 22, 1914) was an industrialist and mayor of Houston.

== Early life ==
Lord was born in Charleston, South Carolina on November 23, 1827, to Jacob Nathaniel Lord and Mary Elizabeth Tarbox Lord.

== Career ==
Lord was a tradesman and an industrialist. He had owned a sawmill in Houston, but was best known for Eagle Iron Works, a manufacturer of iron and brass products.

Lord was elected to his first public office in 1858, when he began serving as Alderman for the First Ward in Houston. In addition to appointment to municipal government, he was elected as Houston City Marshall and Alderman for Fifth Ward. After serving as the Harris County Sheriff and Harris County Commissioner, Houston elected Lord as the 26th mayor of the city. Lord led a ticket of Redeemers, as he and the candidates for Alderman and other local elected officers on his slate swept the 1876 election.

== Personal life ==
In 1848, Lord married Emeline Seddons. They resided in Charleston until the yellow fever epidemic in 1854, which claimed the lives of some of their children. The Lords had a total of sixteen children, but only Sam Lord, Dora Lord, and Mary Elizabeth Lord Noble survived their father.

== Death ==
Lord died on September 23, 1914, and was buried at Glenwood Cemetery in Houston.

== Bibliography ==
- Platt, Harold L. (1983). City Building in the New South: The Growth of Public Services in Houston, Texas, 1830–1910. Philadelphia: Temple University Press. ISBN 0-87722-281-9.

Political offices
Preceded by James T.D. Wilson	Mayor of Houston, Texas; 1841–1842	Succeeded by James T.D. Wilson
