= Joseph Robert Morris =

American businessman and Mayor of Houston, Texas

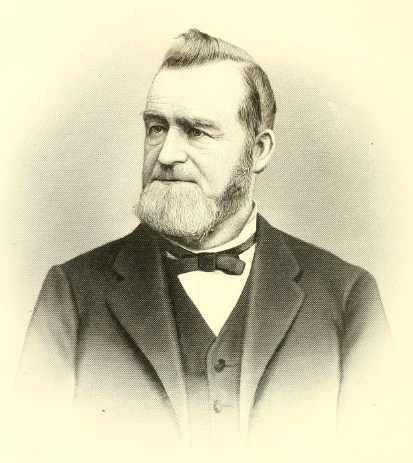

23rd Mayor of Houston
- In office 1868–1870
- Preceded by: Alexander McGowan
- Succeeded by: Thomas Howe Scanlan

Personal details
- Born: April 24, 1828 Milton, Connecticut, U.S.
- Died: December 6, 1885 (aged 57) Houston, Texas, U.S.
- Resting place: Glenwood Cemetery, Houston, Texas, U.S.
- Spouse: Hannah Cordelia Buckner
- Children: six
- Profession: Metalworker, entrepreneur.

Joseph Robert Morris (April 24, 1828 – December 6, 1885) was a metal worker, business owner, investor, and inventor. He briefly served as mayor of Houston, Texas.

== Early life and family ==
Joseph Robert Morris was born on April 24, 1828, in Milton, Connecticut, now a part of Litchfield. He attended school through the age of fourteen, when he moved to New Haven, Connecticut for an apprenticeship to a tinner. He fabricated a stock of tinware and sent it to Texas along with his two younger brothers and his father to Bastrop, Texas around 1845. Morris continued to sell tinware in Connecticut.

== Career ==
Morris's father established a tin store in Bastrop that quickly failed. With his father's health failing, Morris moved to Texas with a stock of tinware, which he peddled in rural Texas. With the proceeds of this business, he settled his father's business debts, then moved to Houston. At first he worked in the tinshop of Alexander McGowan. The next year, in 1847, he set up his own tin shop in Houston, which later expanded into a general hardware business. His inventions included a furnace and a spark arrester, and he gained membership to the British Academy of Sciences.

Morris supported the Union during the Civil War, and was appointed mayor of Houston under the military command of Joseph Jones Reynolds. Morris co-founded two transportation companies, the Houston Direct Navigation Company and the Buffalo Bayou Ship Channel Company. He built one of the first four-story buildings in Houston, and the first with an iron facade. According to the 1870 Census, he was one of the wealthiest persons in Texas.

== Personal life ==
On December 20, 1860, Morris married Hannah Cordelia Buckner. Together they had six children.

== Death ==
Morris died on December 6, 1885. His final resting place is Glenwood Cemetery in Houston.

Political offices
Preceded by Alexander McGowan	Mayor of Houston, Texas; 1868–1870	Succeeded by Thomas Howe Scanlan
