= James Bailey (American politician) =

Texan mayor

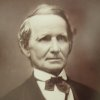
James Bailey

James Bailey (1801–1880) was Mayor of the city of Houston, Texas in 1846.

Bailey immigrated to Houston from New Hampshire in 1838.

In 1840, Bailey was elected as an alderman representing the Fourth Ward of Houston. He chaired the Houston Board of Health in 1844, the year of a severe yellow fever epidemic. Although the cause of yellow fever was not yet known, the Houston Board of Health under Bailey's leadership mandated quarantines to slow the spread of the deadly disease. They also improved drainage, which they believed created more sanitary conditions.

Bailey served as mayor for a one-year term in 1846, the same year that the United States annexed Texas and the War with Mexico began.

== Citations ==
Preceded by William Swain (politician)	Mayor of Houston, Texas; 1846	Succeeded by Benjamin P. Buckner
