= William Swain (politician) =

Mayor of Houston in 1845

William Swain was the Mayor of Houston in 1845.

Swain was a native of North Carolina who relocated his family to Alabama in the 1830s before immigrating to the Republic of Texas, where he first resided in Houston with his wife and five children.

Swain started public office in 1841 when he was elect to serve Third Ward as alderman in Houston. He served one term as Mayor of Houston in 1845. He was a business partner of John Day Andrews.

== Citations ==
Preceded by Horace Baldwin	Mayor of Houston, Texas; 1845	Succeeded by James Bailey (American politician)
