= Daniel C. Smith =

Houston mayor (b. 1836, d. 1915)

Daniel C. Smith (April 30, 1836 - January 1915) was Mayor of Houston, Texas from 1886 to 1890. A railroad machinist, Smith is the only mayor of Houston to have been elected as a sitting member of a labor union. Smith's term was marked by Houston's transition from at-large city council seats to ward-based democratic representation, which impacted how he governed.

== Election ==
Smith ousted the incumbent mayor of Houston at the time, William R. Baker. Baker, a large property owner and the president of both a railroad company and a bank, had been elected because voters believed he could address ongoing financial challenges in the city, but the city's debt continued to rise during his term. Out of 4,500 votes total, Smith prevailed over Baker by only four.

Smith's election was part of a large sweep of city offices by a working class coalition. Whereas previous city councils were composed mostly of business leaders, the Houston City Council that served under Smith's administration included a painter, two railroad superintendents, a yardmaster, a saloon keeper, and a grocer.

== Policies ==
The Smith Administration succeeded in bringing down the debt, leaving Houston with a surplus by the time he left office. Smith also expanded city services into previously neglected neighborhoods.

In particular, transit became much more common throughout the city. Houston's previous railway monopoly had been owned by an entrepreneur from Chicago, but Smith's city council voted to allow a competing system to enter the market, angering the Chicago owner into cancelling a half-million dollar modernization of his system. Many northern business interests who had previously invested in Houston stayed away during Smith's term, but the city was able to leverage competition to greatly expand transit into areas that had not been previously served. The city also managed to regularly tax and regulate private utility investors into paying a larger share than they had when business elites were in charge of City Hall.

Political offices
Preceded by William R. Baker	Mayor of Houston; 1886–1890	Succeeded by Henry Scherffius
