= Henry Brashear Building =

Historic building in Houston, Texas

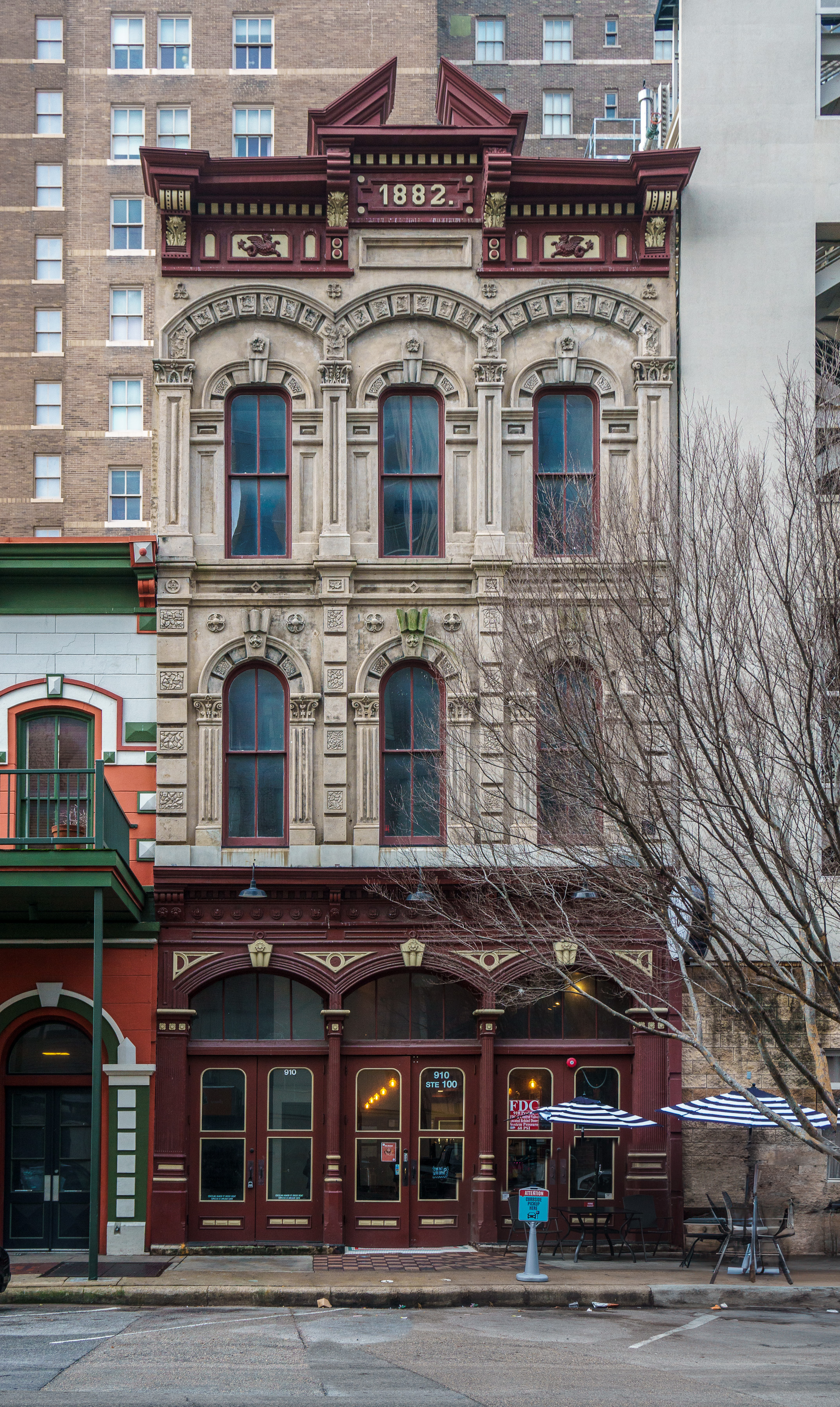
- Interactive map of Henry Brashear Building
- Address: 910 Prairie Avenue; Houston, Texas; United States
- Coordinates: 29°45′39.5″N 95°21′45″W
- Type: Victorian
- Designation: City of Houston Landmark

Construction
- Opened: 1882
- Rebuilt: 1990
- Years active: 1882–
- Architect: Eugene T. Heiner

The Henry Brashear Building is a Victorian-era commercial building at 910 Prairie Avenue in downtown Houston. The building was completed in 1882 under the direction of architect, Eugene T. Heiner. It was restored in 1990 and designated as a Houston landmark in 2009.

== History ==
The Henry Brashear building was named for its owner, who was a judge, a bank officer, and a real estate investor. Brashear was a son of Isaac and Sarah Brashear, who once owned a large tract of land which was later developed as the Houston Heights. Sam Brashear, a brother, was the mayor of Houston.

The Henry Brashear building was designed by Eugene T. Heiner, a Houston architect. The building is located at 910 Prairie Avenue, on the south side of the street, between Main and Travis streets in downtown Houston. Brashear opened the building in 1882 and sold it to Charles Bente in 1890. In the nineteenth-century, the building housed multiple uses, including residences, club rooms, and a variety of retail stores, such as a drug store and a jeweler. Joseph Meyer acquired the building in 1905, when the jewelers Gorman and McAughan moved in. They operated their store at that location until 1950.

Kenny Meyer, Neil M. Sackheim, and Randy Pace planned to restore the Henry Brashear Building after it lay abandoned for years. Architect Guy Hagstette gained clearance for the restoration as a Federal Tax Credit Project and Minette Boesel helped to secure a grant in her role as director of the Main Street Market Square Historic District. The restoration was completed in 1990. This included meeting present-day fire and safety codes, restoring the original plank flooring, and reconstructing a Victorian-era staircase. The Texas Downtown Association awarded the building for Best Store Interior of 1990 and the Greater Houston Preservation Alliance recognized the restoration with a Good Brick Award in 1992.

== Bibliography ==
Fox, Steven (2012). Houston Architecture Guide (Third ed.). Houston: American Institute of Architects Houston Chapter.
