= Andrew J. Burke =

Industrialist and mayor of Houston

Andrew Jackson Burke

Mayor of Houston
- In office 1878–1878
- Preceded by: Irvin Capers Lord
- Succeeded by: William Robinson Baker

Personal details
- Born: October 10, 1813 Elkton, Tennessee, U.S.
- Died: March 22, 1903 (aged 89)
- Spouse: Eloise Lusk
- Profession: merchant

Andrew Jackson Burke (October 10, 1813 – March 22, 1903) was a merchant and mayor of Houston.

== Early life ==
Burke was born on October 10, 1813, in Elkton, Tennessee to Benjamin and Drucilla Burke. He grew up in Elkton, but after his father died in 1830, he pursued opportunities in Mississippi.

== Career ==
Burke started his career working for a merchant in Vicksburg, Mississippi. He managed a store in Amsterdam, Mississippi before moving the San Augustine, Texas to open his own store there in 1837. Later that year, he relocated to Houston, the temporary capitol of the Republic of Texas. He quickly established a large mercantile business with a broad array of goods for sale, and even sold fire insurance. By 1844, he formed the partnership of Shepherd & Burke, and also speculated on Houston real estate. The mercantile partnership lasted until 1854, when Benjamin Armistead Shepherd sold his share of the business to Burke, making way for a mercantile partnership with Erastus S. Perkins. Burke was president of the Planters Mutual Insurance starting in 1870.

== Personal life ==
Burke married Eloise Lusk of St. Augustine, Texas on September 26, 1837. She was the daughter of George Vance Lusk, the first judge of Shelby County, Texas. The couple moved to Houston. Among their children were Matilda Burke Cushing, wife of Edward Hopkins Cushing; Frank S. Burke, an attorney; Edmond L. Burke, a confidant of Edward Mandell House; and Nettie Burke.

== Death ==
Burke died on March 22, 1903.

== Bibliography ==
- Platt, Harold L. (1983). City Building in the New South: The Growth of Public Services in Houston, Texas, 1830–1910. Philadelphia: Temple University Press. ISBN 0-87722-281-9.

Political offices
Preceded by Irvin Capers Lord	Mayor of Houston, Texas; 1878	Succeeded by William Robinson Baker
