= Horace Baldwin =

Mayor of Houston, Texas (1801–1850)

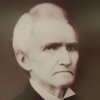
Horace Baldwin

Horace Baldwin (1801–1850) was mayor of Houston, Texas in 1844. His brother-in-law, Augustus Chapman Allen, was a co-founder of Houston, Texas.

A former resident of Baldwinsville, New York, Baldwin came to Houston based on the encouragement of his sister, Charlotte Baldwin Allen. By 1840, he owned substantial real estate in Harris County and the city of Houston. In 1843 he was elected to serve as an alderman of the Fourth Ward and the next year he served as mayor of Houston.

A daughter, Elizabeth Baldwin, married William Marsh Rice.

Political offices
Preceded by Francis W. Moore, Jr.	Mayor of Houston, Texas; 1844	Succeeded by William Swain
