= Thomas Howe Scanlan =

Ex-mayor of Houston, Texas

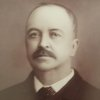
- Thomas Howe Scanlan

24th Mayor of Houston
- In office 1870–1873
- Preceded by: Joseph Robert Morris
- Succeeded by: James T. D. Wilson

Houston Alderman, Third Ward
- In office 1868–1869

Houston Postmaster General
- In office 1875–1879

Personal details
- Born: November 10, 1832 Castle Mahon, Limerick County, Ireland
- Died: July 9, 1906 (aged 73) Chicago, Illinois, U.S.
- Resting place: Glenwood Cemetery, Houston, Texas, U.S.
- Party: Republican
- Spouse: Harmena Ebert

Thomas Howe Scanlan (November 10, 1832 – July 9, 1906) was a mayor of Houston, Texas. He supported the Union during Reconstruction, and was installed as an alderman and mayor during that period. As well as investing in real estate, he owned stakes in local companies, including rail transportation and utilities.

== Early life and family ==
Thomas Howe Scanlan was born on November 10, 1832, in Castle Mahon, County Limerick, Ireland. He moved to New York at the age of seven. Scanlan married Harmena Ebert on April 28, 1861. They raised seven daughters who survived into adulthood.

== Career ==
Scanlan moved to Houston to work as a merchant in 1853.

Scanlan joined the Republican Party at the dawn of Reconstruction, then two years later, accepted a position on Houston City Council representing the Third Ward. The Reconstruction Governor appointed him mayor of Houston in 1870. After collecting opinions among financiers regarding Houston's good credit standing, Scanlan recommended issuing more bonds for capital projects, such as for paving, drainage, and a new city hall complex. He characterized his own approach to public spending as prioritizing function over aesthetics, and evaluated many materials and processes to street improvement. However, his critics noted the extravagant design and cost of the Houston building housing city hall, the market house, and theater.

Scanlan advocated for the purchase of lands for three parks, later indebting the city by constructing a City Hall and Market House in 1872.

Scanlan invested in rail ventures, including the Texas Western Railroad and an early streetcar enterprise, the Bayou City Street Railway Company. His business activities included utility companies, such as the Houston Water Works Company and the Houston Gas Company, where he served as vice-president. He was Houston Postmaster General from 1875 through 1879.

== Death and legacy ==
Scanlan died in Chicago on July 9, 1906. He is interred at Glenwood Cemetery in Houston.

The Scanlan Building, a NRHP-listed property in Downtown Houston, is located on land he purchased in 1865. His seven surviving daughters hired Daniel Burnham to design the building and named it in their father's honor. They donated proceeds from the building to charities. One of his surviving daughters, Lillian, established the Scanlan Foundation upon her death in 1947. Catholic institutions were the beneficiaries of the foundation.

Political offices
Preceded by Joseph Robert Morris	Mayor of Houston, Texas; 1870–1873	Succeeded by James T. D. Wilson
