= Alexander McGowan =

American foundry owner and mayor (1817–1893)

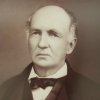
Alexander McGowen

Alexander McGowen (sometimes spelled McGowan; July 5, 1817 – December 26, 1893) was a foundry owner, Mayor of Houston, Texas, and a Chief Justice of Harris County, Texas.

== Early life ==
Alexander McGowen was born in Duplin County, North Carolina on July 5, 1817. He was raised by foster parents and spent most of his youth in Montgomery, Alabama. He moved to Houston in September 1839, opening a tin shop shortly after arriving. He married Sarah Christopher in 1841, and together they had eight children.

== Manufacturing ==
McGowen graduated from tinner to hardware manufacturer, and eventually established a foundry in Houston. He sold his castings and hardware to people in various parts of Texas. He made the castings that Gail Borden used in his machine for making condensed milk. McGowen's foundry manufactured the boiler tubes for the first electrical power plant in Houston.

== Political life ==
In 1845, McGowen was a delegate to the Constitutional Convention for prepare for the annexation of Texas to the United States. He served as Chief Justice of Harris County. He was an alderman (City Council member) in the City of Houston for several terms, and a mayor of Houston for three terms. He was Tax Assessor for Harris County, and served as Harris County Treasurer.

== Death ==
McGowen died on December 26, 1893. He was buried at San Felipe, Texas.

Political offices
Preceded by Cornelius Ennis	Mayor of Houston; 1858	Succeeded by William King
Preceded by Horace D. Taylor	Mayor of Houston; 1867–1868	Succeeded by Joseph R. Morris
