= List of mayors of Houston =

Mayor of Houston
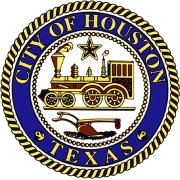
- Seal of the City of Houston

- Flag of the City of Houston

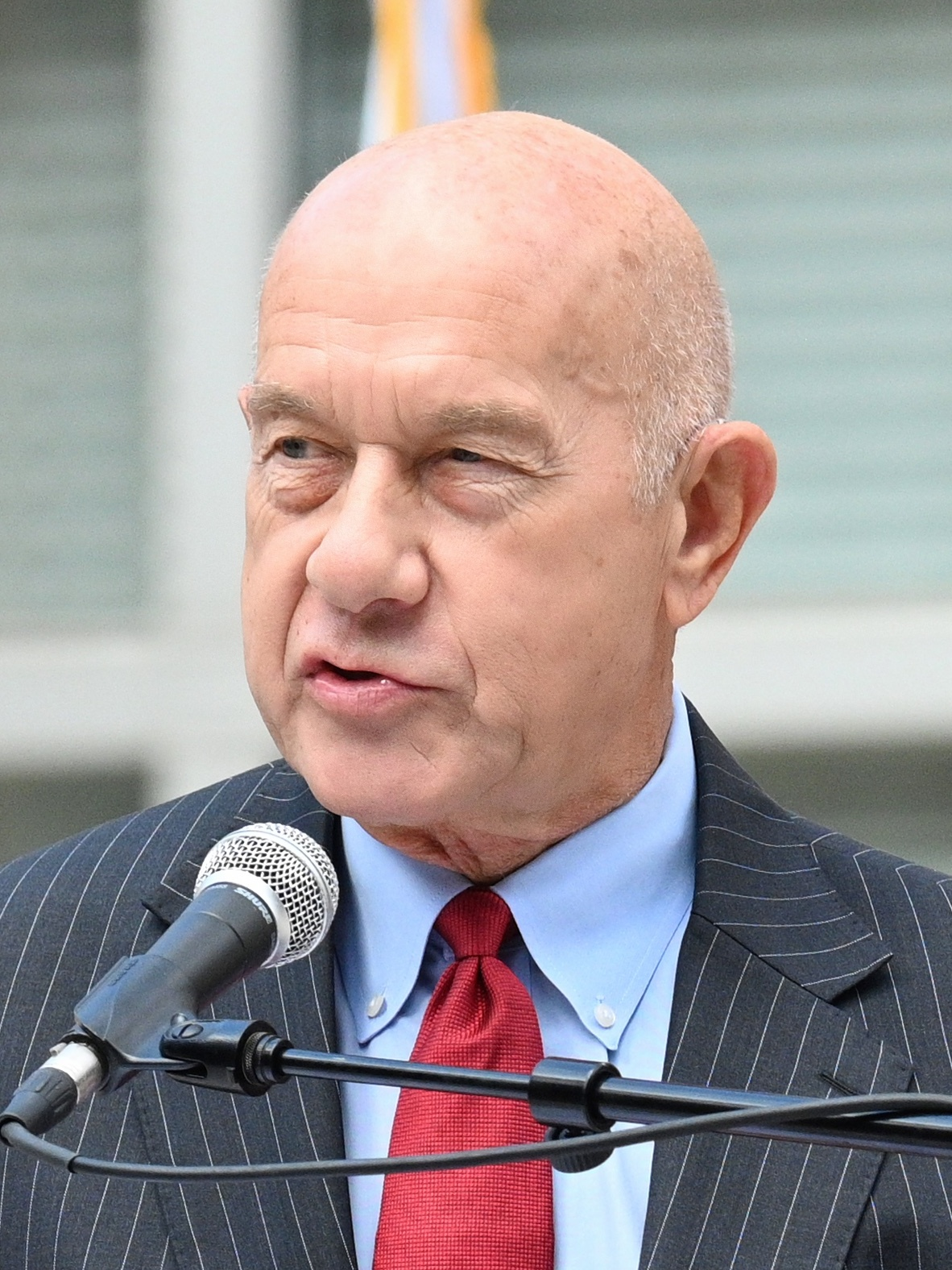
- Incumbent; John Whitmire since January 1, 2024
- Style: The Honorable
- Term length: Four years, renewable once (effective 2016)
- Inaugural holder: James S. Holman; 1837
- Formation: Houston City Charter
- Salary: $236,189 (2019)
- Website: Official website

The following is a list of people who have served as mayor of the city of Houston in the U.S. state of Texas.

== Qualifications, election, and terms ==
To file to run for mayor, a person must be a qualified voter of the city of Houston, and have has resided in the city for at least 12 months immediately preceding the election day; to serve, the person must continue to be a qualified voter and resident. Elections for mayor are held every other odd-numbered year. To serve as mayor of Houston, a person must be a qualified voter and resident of the City. To win the election, a candidate is required to receive the majority of votes; if no candidate receives a majority, a run-off election between the top two

Until 2015, the term of the mayor was two years. Beginning with the tenure of Bob Lanier, the city charter imposed term limits on officeholders of no more than three terms (six years total). On November 3, 2015, voters approved Proposition 2, which extended the terms of the Mayor, City Controller and City Councilmembers to four years, while imposing a limit of two terms.

== List of mayors of Houston ==
| No. | Term | Mayor | Party (Note: Municipal elections in Texas are non-partisan and party affiliation is not listed on the ballot; affiliations listed below are for informational purposes.) |
|---|---|---|---|
| 63 | 2024–present | John Whitmire | Democratic |
| 62 | 2016–2024 | Sylvester Turner | Democratic |
| 61 | 2010–2016 | Annise Parker | Democratic |
| 60 | 2004–2010 | Bill White | Democratic |
| 59 | 1998–2004 | Lee Brown | Democratic |
| 58 | 1992–1998 | Bob Lanier | Democratic |
| 57 | 1982–1992 | Kathy Whitmire | Democratic |
| 56 | 1978–1982 | Jim McConn | Republican |
| 55 | 1974–1978 | Fred Hofheinz | Democratic |
| 54 | 1964–1974 | Louie Welch | Republican |
| 53 | 1958–1964 | Lewis Cutrer | Democratic |
| 52 | 1956–1958 | Oscar F. Holcombe (5th) | Democratic |
| 51 | 1953–1956 | Roy Hofheinz | Democratic |
| 50 | 1947–1953 | Oscar F. Holcombe (4th) | Democratic |
| 49 | 1943–1947 | Otis Massey | Democratic |
| 48 | 1941–1943 | Neal Pickett | Democratic |
| 47 | 1939–1941 | Oscar F. Holcombe (3rd) | Democratic |
| 46 | 1937–1939 | Richard H. Fonville | |
| 45 | 1933–1937 | Oscar F. Holcombe (2nd) | Democratic |
| 44 | 1929–1933 | Walter E. Monteith | Democratic |
| 43 | 1921–1929 | Oscar F. Holcombe | Democratic |
| 42 | 1918–1921 | A. Earl Amerman | |
| 41 | 1917–1918 | Joseph Chappell Hutcheson Jr. | |
| 40 | 1917 | J. J. Pastoriza (died in office) | |
| 39 | 1913–1917 | Ben Campbell | |
| 38 | 1905–1913 | H. Baldwin Rice (2nd) | |
| 37 | 1904–1905 | Andrew L. Jackson | |
| 36 | 1902–1904 | O. T. Holt | |
| 35 | 1901–1902 | John D. Woolford | |
| 34 | 1898–1901 | Samuel H. Brashear | |
| 33 | 1896–1898 | Horace Baldwin Rice | |
| 32 | 1892–1896 | John T. Browne | |
| 31 | 1890–1892 | Henry Scherffius | |
| 30 | 1886–1890 | Daniel C. Smith | |
| 29 | 1880–1886 | William R. Baker | |
| 28 | 1879–1880 | Andrew Jackson Burke | |
| 27 | 1877–1878 | James T. D. Wilson (2nd) | |
| 26 | 1875–1876 | I. C. Lord | |
| 25 | 1874 | James T. D. Wilson | |
| 24 | 1870–1873 | Thomas H. Scanlan | |
| 23 | 1868–1870 | Joseph Robert Morris | |
| 22 | 1867–1868 | Alexander McGowan (2nd) | |
| 21 | 1866 | Horace D. Taylor | |
| 20 | 1863–1865 | William Anders | |
| 19 | 1862 | Thomas W. House | |
| 18 | 1861 | William J. Hutchins | |
| 17 | 1860 | Thomas W. Whitmarsh | |
| 16 | 1859 | William King | |
| 15 | 1858 | Alexander McGowan | |
| 14 | 1856–1857 | Cornelius Ennis | |
| 13 | 1855–1856 | James H. Stevens | |
| 12 | 1853–1854 | Nathan Fuller | |
| 11 | 1849–1852 | Francis W. Moore Jr. (3rd) | |
| 10 | 1847–1848 | Benjamin P. Buckner | |
| 9 | 1846 | James Bailey | |
| 8 | 1845 | William Swain | |
| 7 | 1844 | Horace Baldwin | |
| 6 | 1843 | Francis W. Moore Jr. (2nd) | |
| 5 | 1841–1842 | John Day Andrews | |
| 4 | 1840 | Charles Bigelow | |
| 3 | 1839 | George W. Lively | |
| 2 | 1838–1839 | Francis W. Moore Jr. | |
| 1 | 1837 | James S. Holman | |

== See also ==
- Timeline of Houston
