= John T. Browne =

American politician (1845–1941)

John Thomas Browne
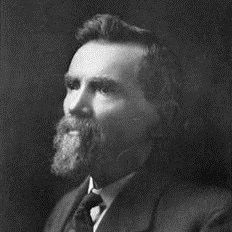
- Portrait of John Thomas Browne, mayor of Houston, Texas

32nd Mayor of Houston
- In office 1892–1896
- Preceded by: Henry Scherffius
- Succeeded by: Horace Baldwin Rice

Member of the Texas House of Representatives
- In office January 12, 1897 – January 8, 1901
- In office January 8, 1907 – January 12, 1909

Personal details
- Born: March 23, 1845 Ballylanders, County Limerick, Ireland
- Died: August 19, 1941 (aged 96) Houston, Texas, U.S.
- Spouse: Mary Jane "Mollie" Bergin (m. 1871)
- Profession: Businessman

John Thomas Browne (March 23, 1845 – August 19, 1941) was an American merchant and politician. He served on the Houston City Council, two terms as Mayor of Houston, and three terms in the Texas House of Representatives.

== Early life ==
John Thomas Browne was born March 23, 1845, in Ballylanders, County Limerick, Ireland to Michael and Winifred (Hennessy) Browne. His family emigrated into the United States in October 1851. Not long after arriving in New Orleans, his father died. In 1852, Winifred relocated with her five children to Houston, Texas to be closer to family of her mother. Winifred's Irish uncle, Patrick Hayes, was an herbal medicine doctor and farmer in Madison County, Texas.

Browne spent much of the 1850s on Spann Plantation in Washington County, Texas at the behest of Father Gunnard, where he also received an education. At age fourteen in 1859, he left the plantation and found work hauling bricks in Madison County, Texas. He returned to Houston to first work as a baggage hauler, then performed messenger duties for Commercial and Southwestern Express Company before settling in at the Houston and Texas Central Railroad. The 1860 Census listed John residing with his mother in Houston's Fourth Ward.

== Civil War ==
Correction: The tombstone of Mayor John T. Browne in the City of Houston actually states that he served in Company A, 36 Texas Cavalry. Family history passed down that he was seriously wounded in a major battle of the Civil War, but recovered fully. Browne joined the Confederacy, officially serving in Company B of the Second Texas Infantry. He served in Houston, detached from his unit, maintaining employment with the Houston and Texas Central Railroad, but in a new capacity as a fireman. He was briefly dispatched to the defense of Galveston, Texas. He was officially released from military duty in Houston on June 27, 1865.

== Rise to the Merchant Class ==
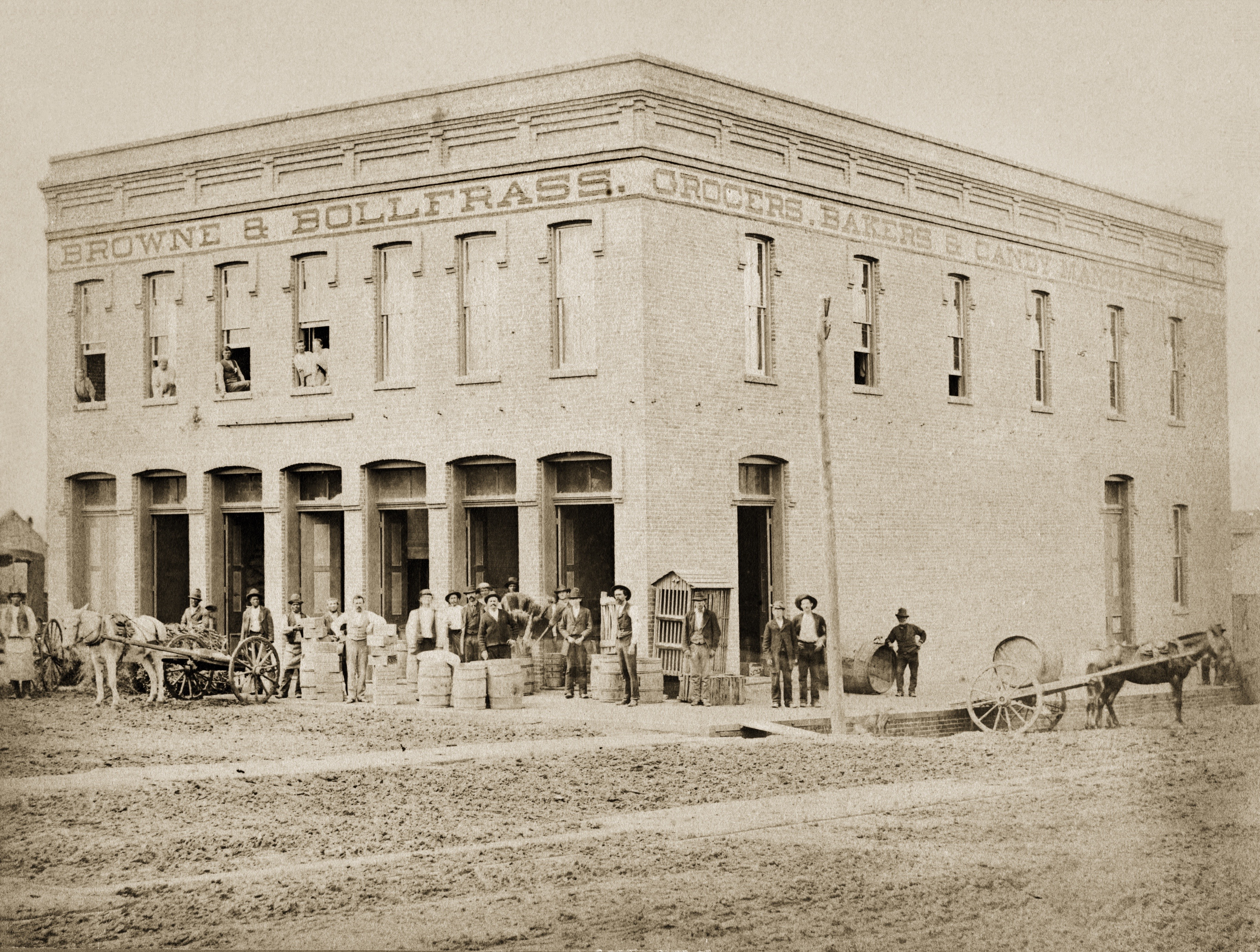
Browne and Bollfrass Building

Browne returned to messenger service in Houston after the Civil War. He worked for Adams Express Company, then for Southern Express Company. He transitioned into the grocery business first as a bookkeeper and clerk for H.P. Levy.

Browne married Mary Jane "Mollie" Bergin on September 13, 1871. They were the first marriage to be recorded at the Annunciation Catholic Church. In 1872, Browne and Charles Bollfrass started a business as wholesale and retail grocers with $500 in capital. By the early 1890s, this grocery was amassing about $340,000 in annual sales.

He was a member of the Ancient Order of Hibernians and the Knights of Columbus.

== Political life ==
Browne was elected to Houston City Council, representing the Fifth Ward while chairing the Finance Committee in 1887. He ran for Mayor of Houston in 1892. He won in a landslide: 3900 to 600. During his time as mayor he lived in the Fifth Ward.

Browne's first term as Mayor of Houston began the same year as the Panic of 1893. He had campaigned on a platform of balancing the budget. The City of Houston ran budget deficits during Browne's first term, but these deficits were proportionately lower than those in previous years. Browne had been an advocate for lowering municipal utility bills through municipal ownership of the utilities. However, estimates for the City of Houston to build its own waterworks and electrical power plant had gone up to a range $500,000 to $900,000. Browne abandoned this option while favoring a policy of dedicating all capital spending on street paving and sewerage. The Browne administration also hired a city planning expert to study demands based hypothetically on a population of 75,000.

Mayor Browne proposed converting the Houston Volunteer Firefighters to a professional department under municipal management. The City of Houston would need to buy existing equipment and horses from the volunteer department, but could lease firehouses and would not be required to buy them. Houston City Council drafted an ordinance and passed it.

In April 1895, the Texas Supreme Court ruling in Higgins v. Bordages, "held that special assessment tax liens were unenforceable against urban homesteads." The City of Houston imposed special tax levies for road and sewerage projects on owners of property abutting the sections of street being improved. The ruling effectively removed the only tool the city had for enforcing payment of the special assessments by homeowners. Road construction contractors stopped all work because they feared the city would not pay them. Many homeowners stopped paying their assessment bills.

To meet this immediate revenue crisis, the Browne administration devised a plan to issue $500,000 in municipal bonds to be sold over a three to four-year period. The Labor Council opposed the bonding measure and organized to defeat the measure when the referendum made it to the ballot. The City of Houston would need to find another way to compensate for $300,000 in uncollected taxes.

Browne represented Houston in the Texas House of Representatives from 1897 to 1899, and again in 1907.

== Death ==
Browne died on August 19, 1941, of pneumonia in Houston. He was buried at Glenwood Cemetery in Houston. He was survived by six children and thirty-eight grand children.

In 1979, his former residence in the Fifth Ward was used by an Italian American-owned grocery, Orlando's Grocery.

Political offices
Preceded by Henry Scherffius	Mayor of Houston, Texas; 1892–1896	Succeeded by Horace Baldwin Rice
