= William R. Baker =

American politician

William Robinson Baker
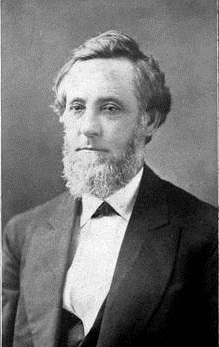
- William Robinson Baker, Mayor of Houston

29th Mayor of Houston
- In office 1880–1886
- Preceded by: Andrew J. Burke
- Succeeded by: Daniel C. Smith

Member of the Texas Senate from the 14th district
- In office January 13, 1874 – April 18, 1876
- Preceded by: James G. Tracy
- Succeeded by: John R. Henry

Personal details
- Born: May 21, 1820 Baldwinsville, New York
- Died: April 30, 1890 (aged 69)
- Spouse: Hester E. Runnels (m. 1845)
- Children: Lucy Baker
- Profession: Businessman

William Robinson Baker (May 21, 1820 – April 30, 1890) was an American railroad executive and politician who served as the 29th Mayor of Houston from 1880 to 1886. Baker was previously the Director and Vice President of the Houston and Texas Central Railroad and represented the 14th district in the Texas Senate for one term, from 1874 to 1876.

== Early life ==
Baker was born on May 21, 1820, in Baldwinsville, New York to Asa Baker and the former Hannah Robinson. He lived in New York until age 17 at which time he moved to Houston in the Republic of Texas. There he was a bookkeeper for the Houston Town Company for about two years. Starting around 1839, he managed a general store for two years. In 1841, Baker successfully ran for County Clerk of Harris County, a position he held for 16 years.

== Career ==
In 1852, Baker became the Secretary of the Texas Central Railroad, and in 1856, Secretary of the Houston and Texas Central Railroad. He eventually became Director and the Vice President of the line. From 1868 to 1871 was President of the railroad, and from 1873 to 1875, served as Vice-President and Manager. He sold his interests and retired from the railroad business in 1877.

According to the 1860 United States Census, Baker owned real estate valued at $300,000 and personal property valued at $75,000. Baker was one of just twenty-eight Texans in 1860 with at least $200,000 real estate assets.

In 1874, Baker was elected to the Texas Senate from the 14th district and served one term.

Baker was the first Houston mayor to hold office for three terms, serving the city from 1880 through 1886. He failed in a bid for a fourth term in 1886 when he lost the election by just four votes.

== Personal life ==
In December 1845, Baker married Hester E. Runnels. She was a niece of former Mississippi Governor Hiram Runnels.

All of Baker's sisters followed him to Houston. His eldest sister, Marianna, resided with him and kept house for him until her marriage to Thomas M. Bagby. Likewise, his sister Emily lived in Houston for a few years before her marriage to Horace D. Taylor. Julia married William Clark and Hattie married Alexander Szabo.

== Death ==
Baker died April 30, 1890. He is buried at Glenwood Cemetery in Houston.

== Bibliography ==
- Becker, Ann Dunphy (2010). Houston: 1860 to 1900. Charleston, SC: Arcadia Publishing. ISBN 978-0-7385-6683-2.
- Red, Ellen Robbins (1986). Early Days on the Bayou 1838–1890: The Life and Letters of Horace Dickinson Taylor. Waco, Texas: Texian Press.

Texas Senate
Preceded by James G. Tracy	Member of the Texas Senate from the 14th district 1874–1876	Succeeded by John R. Henry
Political offices
Preceded by Andrew J. Burke	Mayor of Houston; 1880–1886	Succeeded by Daniel C. Smith
