= Charlotte Baldwin Allen =

Wife of a co-founder of Houston, Texas

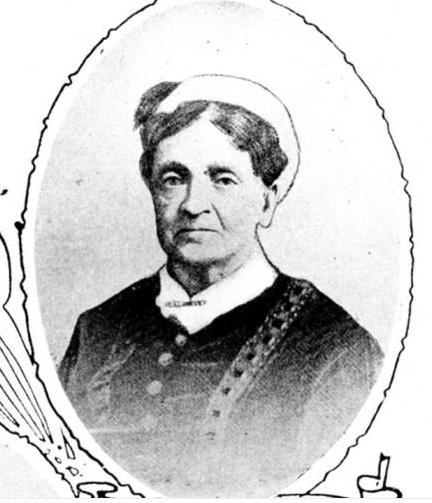
Charlotte Allen

Charlotte Baldwin Allen (July 14, 1805 – August 3, 1895) is known in Texan history as the "mother of Houston". She was the wife of Augustus Chapman Allen, who used her inheritance to finance the founding of this city.

== Early life ==
Charlotte (Mary) Baldwin Allen was born July 14, 1805, in Baldwinsville, Onondaga County, New York, to Eliza and Jonas Cutler Baldwin. She married Augustus Chapman Allen on May 3, 1831. In 1832, her husband and his brother John Kirby Allen left New York state for Texas, settling temporarily in San Augustine, Texas (Mexico). Charlotte Allen probably rejoined her husband in Texas in 1834. She established a residence in Nacogdoches, Texas (Mexico).

== Founding of Houston ==
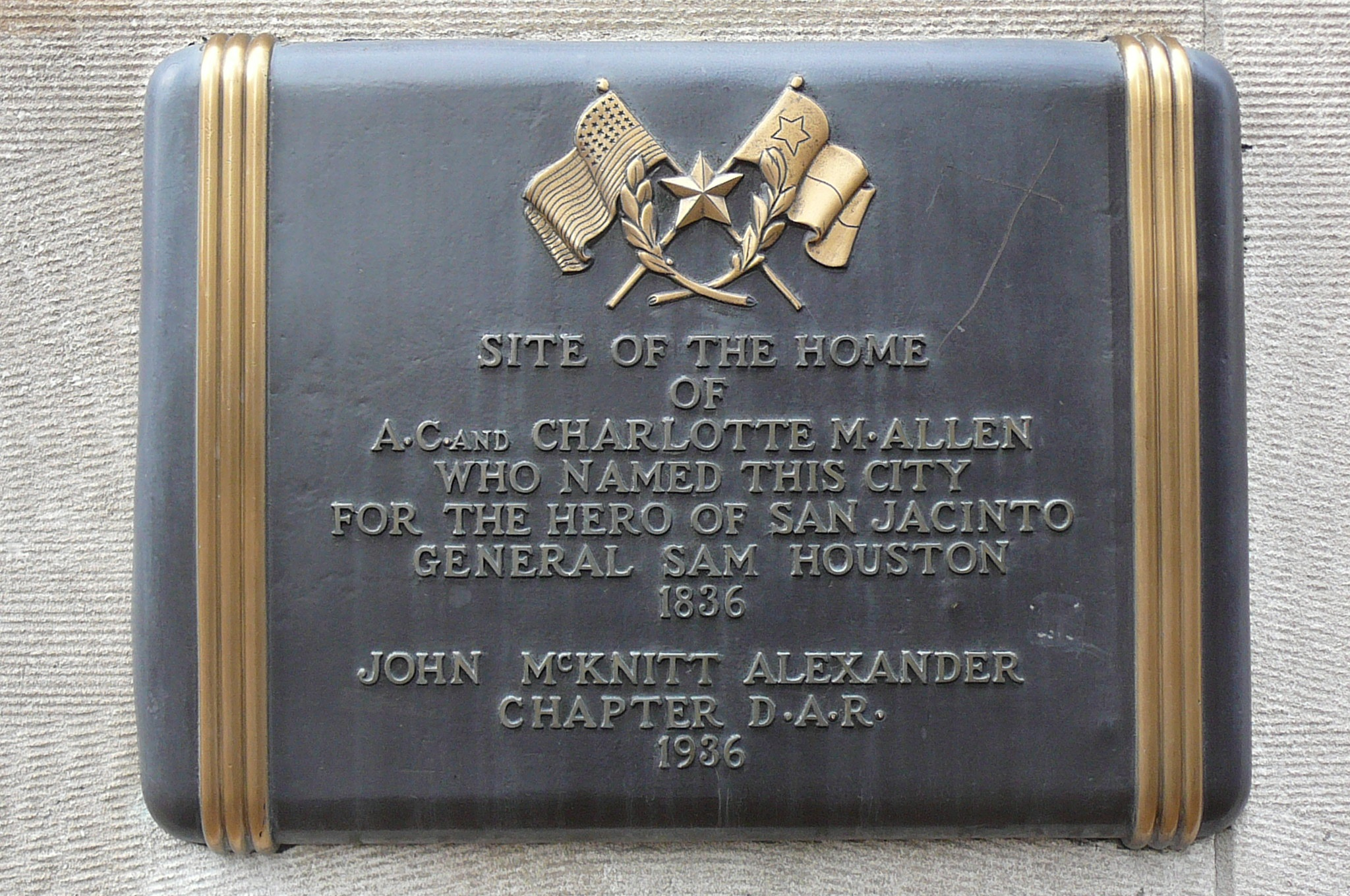
Plaque commemorating home site of Charlotte Allen

When John Kirby Allen and Augustus Chapman Allen bought land for the town site of Houston, they had been investing some of Charlotte Allen's inheritance. As Houston was surveyed in 1836 and settled beginning early in 1837, Charlotte and Augustus Allen built a house on Prairie Street at Caroline in Houston. Their next-door neighbor would be the President of Texas, Sam Houston. One of Charlotte Allen's house guests was Mary Austin Holley, who kept a journal of her experiences of early Houston and drew a sketch of the Capitol. Many sources credit her for naming the City of Houston.

Her brother-in-law, John Allen, died in 1838. Augustus Allen left Houston for Mexico. Charlotte remained in Houston and continued to manage the Allens' business interests. They separated in 1850. The Old Capitol Hotel passed on to Charlotte, and it was run as a hotel until she sold the property in 1857.

== Death ==
Allen died in Houston on August 3, 1895, at ninety. She was buried at Glenwood Cemetery in Houston. The Texas State Historical Association sponsored a historical plaque at her grave site in 2009.

== Legacy ==
In 2019 a former DoubleTree hotel in Downtown Houston was renamed the C. Baldwin Hotel.

== See also ==
- Charlotte Allen Fountain
