= Augustus Chapman Allen =

Texas political leader (1806–1864)

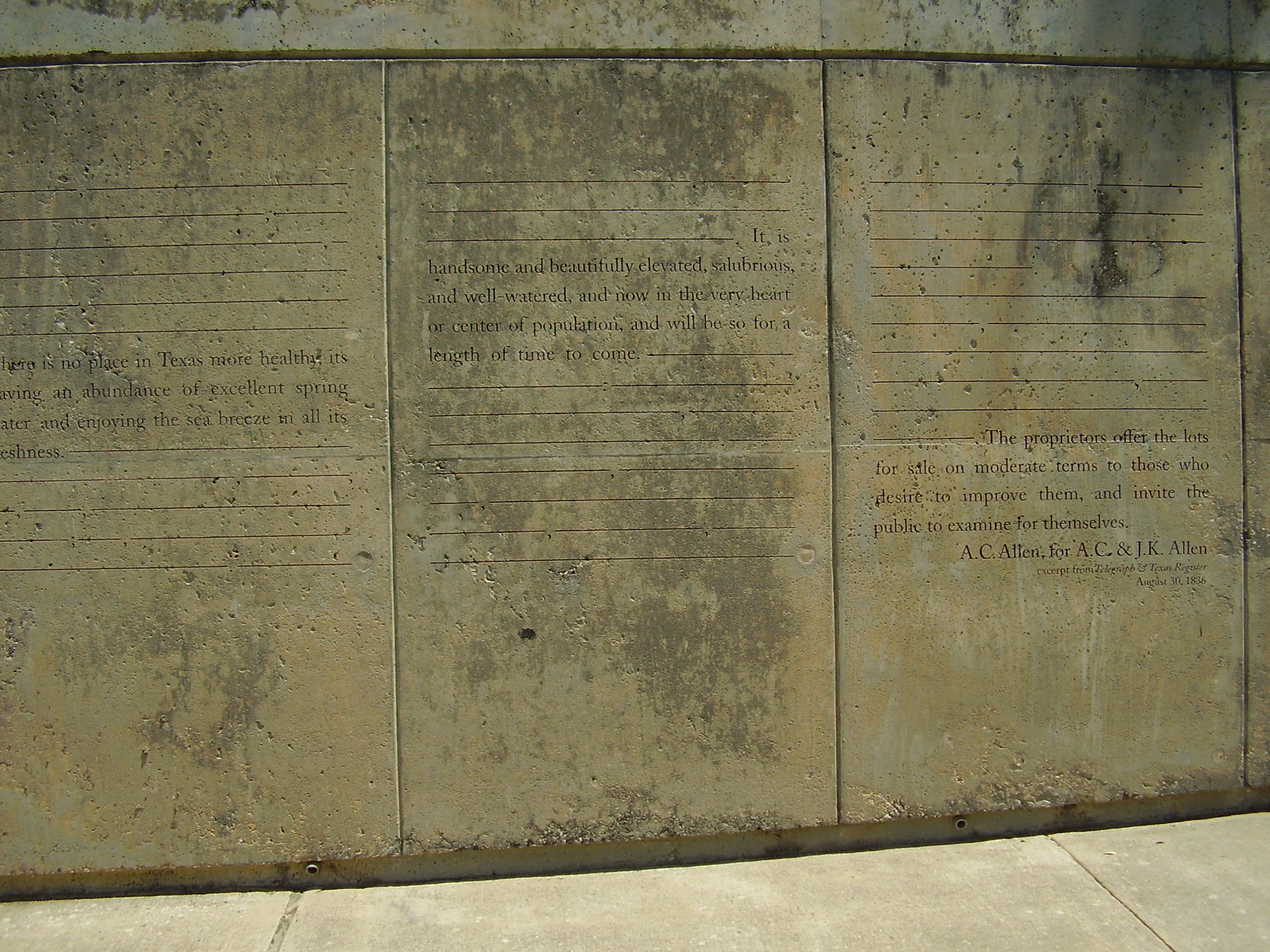
Marker in Downtown Houston commemorating the foundation of Houston by the Allen Brothers - An excerpt from the Telegraph and Texas Register dated August 30, 1836, is visible.

Augustus Chapman Allen (July 4, 1806 – January 11, 1864), along with his younger brother, John Kirby Allen, founded the City of Houston in the U.S. state of Texas. He was born on July 4, 1806, in Canaseraga Village, New York (now the hamlet of Sullivan in the Town of Sullivan, New York), to Sarah (Chapman) and Roland Allen.

== Early years ==
Not long after turning 17, Augustus graduated from the Polytechnic Institute at Chittenango, New York, and started teaching mathematics there. In 1827, he changed careers and resigned his professorship. Allen then went to work as a bookkeeper for the H. and H. Canfield Company in New York. After two years, he and his brother John bought an interest in the business. In the summer of 1832, the Allen brothers left Canfield to move to Texas, where they settled in San Augustine. By June 1833, the brothers had moved to Nacogdoches.

== In Texas ==
The Allen brothers arrived first in Galveston, Texas, and then moved to the small town of Saint Augustine. In 1833, Allen and his brother associated with a group of entrepreneurs in Nacogdoches and started operating as land speculators.

=== During the Texas Revolution ===
Instead of joining the army when the Texas War of Independence started, Augustus and his brother engaged in keeping supply channels open. At their own expense, they outfitted a ship, the Brutus, to protect the Texas coast and assist troops and supplies from the United States to arrive safely in Texas.

Nevertheless, some members of the Texas provisional government objected to the Allen brothers' activities, and rumors indicated they were engaged in privateering. In January 1836, they sold the Brutus to the Texas Navy, and it became only the second ship in the fledgling naval force. Augustus and John Allen continued to raise money and operate as receivers and dispensers of supplies and funds for the war effort without charge. Despite the brothers' services, gossip and censure were aimed at the Allens because they were not in the armed services.

=== After the Revolution ===
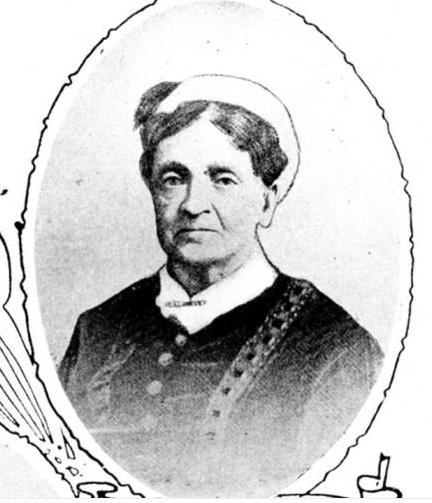
Charlotte Allen

Financed by an inheritance received by Augustus' wife, Charlotte, on August 26, 1836, the Allen brothers purchased 6,600 acres (27 km^{2}) along the Buffalo Bayou for $5,000, to establish a new city. At the suggestion of Charlotte, they named their townsite for the hero of the time, General Sam Houston.

In the years after his brother John's death in 1838, the Allen family grew apart and squabbled about the family's various businesses and finances, which had been somewhat commingled. These family disputes eventually led to Allen's separation from his wife in 1850.

== Later life and legacy ==
Soon, Allen's health began to fail, and he decided to leave Houston, signing over to his wife, whom he had never divorced, most of what remained of his many enterprises. Augustus Allen relocated to Mexico to tend to his health and a new start in life.

In 1852, Augustus was appointed United States consul for the port of Tehuantepec on the Pacific Ocean, and in 1858, he was given the same position for the port of Minotitlán. These offices gave him control of the consular affairs of the United States for the entire Isthmus of Tehuantepec, a commercially important position.

In partnership with an Englishman named Welsh, Allen developed an extensive private shipping business. He was never able to recover his health, however, and realized, in 1864, that he was critically ill. Augustus then closed his business and went to Washington, D.C., to resign his consulships. Soon after arriving there, he contracted pneumonia, and died on Monday, January 11, 1864, aged 58 in Washington, D.C., and was buried in the Green-Wood Cemetery in Brooklyn, New York. Several Houston landmarks, including Allen Parkway and Allen Center, as well as Allen's Landing Park, commemorate Augustus and his brother, the city's two founders.

New York Times (New York, NY), Fri., 15 Jan 1864, p. 5, c. 3
New York Herald (New York, NY), Fri., 15 Jan 1864, p. 8, c. 3

DIED - ALLEN - In Washington, D.C., on Monday, Jan. 11, Augustus C. Allen. His friends are invited to attend his funeral, which will occur at the Church of the Transfiguration, 29th St., this day (Friday) 15th inst., at 10 A.M.
