= Bremond (disambiguation) =

Bremond is a city in Robertson County, Texas, United States.

Bremond or Brémond may also refer to:

- Antonin Brémond (1692–1755), Master of the Order of Preachers 1748–1755
- Édouard Brémond (1868–1948), French Army officer
- Henri Brémond (1865–1933), French literary scholar, sometime Jesuit, and Catholic philosopher
- Iryna Brémond (born 1984), Belarusian-French tennis player
- Jean-François Brémond (1807–1868), French painter
- Karine Brémond (born 1975), French swimmer
- Paul Bremond (1810–1885), American businessman
- Séverine Beltrame (born 1979, married name Brémond 2005–2008), French tennis player

== See also ==
- Bremond Block Historic District (Austin, Texas)
- Bremond Independent School District, Bremond, Texas
