= Mexia-Nelleva Cutoff =

The Mexia-Nelleva Cutoff was a railroad cutoff constructed between Nelleva and Mexia, in eastern Texas. It has not been used since 1933, when it was abandoned by its owner, the Houston and Texas Central Railway (H&TC).

== History ==
Construction of the Mexia-Nelleva Cutoff started in 1905. The new 94-mile (152 km) line was built to shorten the distance between the Texas towns of Nelleva, a small community on the north side of Navasota, and Mexia. E.H. Harriman, who controlled the Union Pacific and the Southern Pacific spearheaded construction of the cutoff. Both Mexia and Nelleva were on the existing H&TC railway between Houston and Dallas via Hearn. The new cutoff would shorten the existing route by about 15 miles (24 km) with lower grades and fewer curves.

Portions of the route of the Mexia-Nelleva Cutoff would be immediately adjacent to B. F. Yoakum's line, the Gulf Coast Lines, part of a collection of routes planned to link south Texas with New Orleans. (Yoakum also controlled the St. Louis–San Francisco Railway (the "Frisco") and the Chicago, Rock Island and Pacific Railroad. Both were major midwestern systems with rails reaching into north Texas from Oklahoma.) The 94-mile cutoff was completed in 1907 in time to compete with Yoakum's new Trinity and Brazos Valley Railway (T&BV) line, which Yoakum had gained control of in 1904.

Over the years, Yoakum's line flourished due primarily to the connecting traffic provided by the other railroads Yoakum controlled. Eventually, Yoakum lost control of these railroads and the T&BV's traffic suffered; the line went into a 16-year receivership from which it emerged in 1930 controlled by a partnership of the Rock Island and the Burlington System. Today, it is the BNSF main line between Waxahachie and Houston.

By contrast, Harriman's Mexia-Nelleva Cutoff had virtually no local traffic provided by the small communities on the line. And while it was faster than the H&TC line via Hearne for through trains, the marginal increase in speed was insufficient to cover the costs of maintaining an additional route between the two endpoints.

In the end, it may have been SP's competition with the Texas and Pacific Railway between Texarkana and El Paso that finally doomed the Mexia-Nelleva Cutoff. The T&P could carry transcontinental traffic directly across Texas and interchange it with the SP in El Paso. This service competed favorably with SP's much longer route across Texas that required a connection with the Sunset Route at Houston. To improve the situation, SP opened the Dalsa Cutoff in 1914 between Hearne and Flatonia, shortening the route across Texas by 140 miles (226 km). Through freights that might previously have been routed via the Mexia-Nelleva Cutoff and the Sunset Route connecting at Houston could now bypass Houston, Texas altogether. With stiff competition from the T&BV for the Gulf coast traffic, a diversion of transcontinental freight traffic to the Dalsa Cutoff, and virtually no local traffic, the Mexia-Nelleva Cutoff was doomed; it was finally abandoned in 1933.

Of the 94 mile route between Mexia and Nelleva, approximately 80 miles (129 km) of it has been preserved as a transportation corridor in one form or another. Most of this is part of Farm to Market Road 39, which is constructed atop the old right-of-way between Iola and Mexia, a distance of roughly 71 miles (114 km). A one mile section of Farm to Market Road 3090 near the community of Piedmont is built on the right-of-way as is a three mile Grimes County gravel road near the community of Carlos (at the intersection of State Highway 30 and Farm to Market Road 244).

In 1977, five miles of the original cutoff route was rebuilt as a rail spur to serve the Texas Municipal Power Agency's Gibbons Creek Generating Plant south of Iola in Grimes County. The spur connects to the BNSF line that was formerly the rival T&BV line. In 1995 and 1996, an extension to the rail spur was constructed to allow the unloading of coal at the power plant. This extension included a rail loop which was all within the existing plant boundary; a portion of this extension also followed the bed of the old rail line. South of the power plant, the grade serves as a gravel road leading north and south out of Carlos. It can be seen again along FM 3090, near the old community of Piedmont. Except for the brief section of FM3090 built on the right-of-way, there is little access to the old route between Carlos and Nelleva.
