= Houston Direct Navigation Company =

American transportation company

- Type: Corporation
- Industry: Transportation
- Predecessor: Houston Navigation Company
- Founded: October 9, 1866
- Founder: Thomas M. Bagby, Charles S. Longcope, Joseph Robert Morris, William Marsh Rice, Alexander Sessums, John H. Sterrett, and others.
- Defunct: 1927
- Fate: Defunct
- Headquarters: Houston, Texas, United States
- Area served: Buffalo Bayou and Galveston Bay
- Key people: John H. Sterrett, founder and agent; John Shearn, President
- Services: Intermodal freight, passenger service

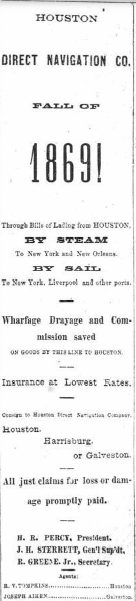
Advertisement

Houston Direct Navigation Company operated ships on Buffalo Bayou between 1866 and 1927. It had had two antecedent companies with similar subscriber lists and management: the Houston and Galveston Navigation Company, and the Houston Navigation Company.

== Houston and Galveston Navigation Company ==
In 1851, William Marsh Rice founded the Houston and Galveston Navigation Company with his own capital of $5,000 and the capital of twenty-five other investors. These included Paul Bremond, Cornelius Ennis, William J. Hutchins, and John H. Sterrett.

== Houston Navigation Company ==
One of the company's antecedents was the Houston Navigation Company, formed in 1854 by many of the same principals as the Houston and Galveston Navigation Company.

== After the Civil War ==
The Houston Direct Navigation Company transported freight and passengers from Houston to railheads along Buffalo Bayou. Houston Direct Navigation Company was founded on October 9, 1866, by William Marsh Rice, Thomas M. Bagby, John H. Sterrett, and several others. Businesses receiving and shipping goods from Houston were paying high fees for moving freight through Galveston, Texas. The company offered cheaper transportation, which bypassed Galveston and its Galveston Wharf Company.

At first, the company's main business in the late-1860s consisted of lightering around Galveston and interlining freight through the Buffalo Bayou, Brazos and Colorado Railroad; however, it expanded service, running five passenger steamers by 1870. The company continued to expand its fleet, even as passenger demand diminished. Three steamers operated for freight-only in 1873, along with 22 barges with three tugs, the only two steamers transported passengers.
