= Houston Plank Road Company =

American transportation company

The Houston Plank Road Company was formed in 1850 by businessmen with interests in Houston, Texas, including Thomas M. Bagby, Paul Bremond, Thomas William House, William J. Hutchins, William Marsh Rice, A.S. Ruthven, and B.A. Shepherd. Many farmers along the Brazos and Colorado River valleys shipped their produce to the Houston wharf in order to transload to steamships. Freight transportation by wagon was both slow and expensive. They planned to construct a road from Houston to the Brazos River, just below Washington, Texas. The plank road would be fifty feet wide and built from oaken planks, which would allow teamsters to drive their draft animals on a dry and smooth road.

The State of Texas granted a charter for the plank road on February 7, 1850. The Houston Plank Road Company issued $50,000 of stock within the first three months, and raised an extra $25,000 in September. After grading 23 miles of road along the route from Houston to the Brazos River July 1852, the company issued additional bonds for $46,000. However, the plan was abandoned when cost estimates came in at $2,500 per mile.
