= Albert Patrick =

Albert Patrick may refer to:

- Albert T. Patrick (1866–1940), American lawyer
- Albert Patrick (wrestler) (born 1950), Scottish wrestler
