= Bremond Colored High School =

School in Bremond, Texas, US, 1920–1965

Location
- Bremond, Texas, U.S. 31.174916°N 96.673474°W

Information
- Former names: Love High School; Bremond Colored School; Bremond Negro School
- Established: 1920
- Founder: T. W. Parker
- Closed: 1965
- Principal: Charles Love (1925–1965)

Bremond Colored High School (1920–1965) was a school for African American students in Bremond, Texas, U.S. It was formerly called Love High School, Bremond Colored School, and Bremond Negro School.

== History ==
The school was founded by T. W. Parker in 1920. Charles Love served as principal from 1925 to 1965.

By 1940, the school had five teachers; and in 1947 that increased to nine teachers. The male students built the classrooms in 1947 with financial help from the Dallas War Assets Administration, and re-used lumber from Camp Hearne.

It closed in 1965 with desegregation, and students were sent to Bremond High School. A historical marker was erected 2015 by Texas Historical Commission, to commemorate the school's history.

== See also ==
- Bremond Independent School District
