= The Trust (1993 film) =

- Directed by: Neil Havens; Douglas Kilgore
- Written by: Douglas Kilgore
- Starring: Karen Black; Sam Bottoms; Jim Bernhard; Harold Suggs
- Cinematography: Claudia Raschke
- Music by: George Burt
- Distributed by: Quadrangle Productions
- Release date: 23 April 1993
- Running time: 120 min.
- Country: United States
- Language: English

The Trust is a 1993 American crime drama film about the mysterious death of William Marsh Rice in 1900 and the people involved with it. The story is based partially in fact but has elements taken from theories developed through the years. It was produced by Quadrangle Productions and co-directed by Neil Havens and Douglas Kilgore, who also wrote the screenplay based on his own play.

== Premise ==
William Marsh Rice is murdered by a reputable lawyer named Albert T. Patrick, who claims Mr. Rice died in his sleep. The movie focuses on Mr. Patrick's actions after the crime as well as the investigation led by James Baker.

== Production ==
William Marsh Rice's legacy is the prestigious Rice University located in Houston, Texas. The film was shot on location at the university and in the Houston surrounding area.

== Cast ==
- Karen Black as Maria Vandermmeer
- Sam Bottoms as James Baker
- Jim Bernhard as Mr.Swenson
- Jon Bruno as Albert Patrick
- Charles Charpiot as Captain McKlusky
- Valerie Davis as Joy
- Luis Lemus as James Osborne
- Joseph 'Chepe' Lockett as Bank Manager
- Michael Lorre as Charlie Jones (as Michael Petty)
- Alan Martin as Graduate
- Leon Alvarado as Graduate 2 (uncredited)
- Glay Posch as Saloon Singer
- Troy Reynolds as Bailiff
- Suzanne Savoy as Alice Graham Baker
- Randel B. Smith as Bank Clerk
- Harold Suggs as William Marsh Rice
- Maurice Tuttle as Secretary to James Baker
- David Campbell as Attorney (uncredited)
- Delores Wheeler as Attorney's Wife
- Greg Lawson as Pallbearer (uncredited)
- Tamer Riad as Reporter (uncredited)
