= John Sterrett =

John Sterrett may refer to:

- John H. Sterrett, American ship captain and investor
- John Robert Sitlington Sterrett, American classical scholar and archeologist
