= Nelleva, Texas =

- Unincorporated community
- Location within Texas Location within the United States
- Coordinates: 30°27′17″N 96°11′11″W
- Country: United States
- State: Texas
- County: Brazos
- Elevation: 269 ft (82 m)
- Time zone: UTC-6 (Central (CST))
  - Summer (DST): UTC-5 (CDT)
- Area code: 979
- GNIS feature ID: 1380240

Nelleva is an unincorporated community in Brazos County, in the U.S. state of Texas. According to the Handbook of Texas, no population estimates were available for the community in 2000. It is located within the Bryan-College Station metropolitan area.

== History ==
The community was founded at the start of the 20th century as a flag stop on the International-Great Northern Railroad. There was a church, a school, and several houses in 1940, of which only the homes remained in 1980. The community continued to be listed on state highway maps in 1992.

The Mexia-Nelleva Cutoff was built to shorten the distance between it and Mexia in 1905.

== Geography ==
Nelleva is located at the intersection of Farm to Market Road 2154 and a county road on the Southern Pacific Railroad, 22 mi (35 km) southeast of Bryan.

== Education ==
Nelleva had its own school in 1940 and joined the Navasota Independent School District in the 1960s.
