= Iola Independent School District =

School district in Texas, United States

Address
- 22875 FM 39 Iola, Texas, 77861; United States

District information
- Type: Public
- Grades: PK–12
- Schools: 2
- NCES District ID: 4824240

Students and staff
- Students: 610 (2023–2024)
- Teachers: 57.18 (on an FTE basis) (2023–2024)
- Staff: 39.10 (on an FTE basis) (2023–2024)
- Student–teacher ratio: 10.67 (2023–2024)

Other information
- Website: www.iolaisd.net

The Iola Independent School District is a public school district based in Iola, Texas, United States. The district serves Iola and unincorporated areas in northwestern Grimes County.

== Schools ==
The Iola Independent School District operates two schools: Iola Elementary School (grades PK-6) and Iola High School (grades 7-12). Both schools as well as the district's administrative offices are housed on a single campus at the corner of FM 39 and Fort Worth Street.

In September 2009, Iola Elementary School was declared a National Blue Ribbon School of Excellence by the United States Department of Education.

== Student demographics ==
As of the 2008-2009 school year, Iola ISD enrolled a total of 497 students. The gender distribution was 230 males (46.3%) and 267 females (53.7%). The ethnic composition of the district was 85.71% White, 10.87% Hispanic, and 3.42% African American. 45.1% of the district's students were considered economically disadvantaged with 26.0% classified as "At-Risk."

=== Historic district enrollment ===
- 1988-89 - 364 students
- 1989-90 - 378 students
- 1990-91 - 373 students
- 1991-92 - 388 students
- 1992-93 - 406 students
- 1993-94 - 422 students
- 1994-95 - 433 students
- 1995-96 - 450 students
- 1996-97 - 491 students
- 1997-98 - 452 students
- 1998-99 - 441 students
- 1999-00 - 473 students
- 2000-01 - 447 students
- 2001-02 - 453 students
- 2002-03 - 451 students
- 2003-04 - 472 students
- 2004-05 - 497 students
- 2005-06 - 508 students
- 2006-07 - 488 students
- 2007-08 - 506 students

In 1965 the school had 235 students in all 12 grades in one building. Of the students, 85 were high school students.

== Controversy ==
In July 2024, the ACLU of Texas sent the Iola Independent School District a letter, alleging that the district's 2023-2024 dress and grooming code appeared to violate the Texas CROWN Act, a state law which prohibits racial discrimination based on hair texture or styles, and asking the district to revise its policies for the 2024-2025 school year.

== See also ==
- List of school districts in Texas
