= Thomas William House Sr. =

Texan businessman and Mayor of Houston

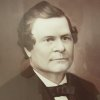
- Official mayoral portrait

19th Mayor of Houston
- In office 1862–1862
- Preceded by: William J. Hutchins
- Succeeded by: William Anders

Personal details
- Born: March 4, 1814 Stoke St Gregory, Somerset, England
- Died: January 17, 1880 (aged 65) San Antonio, Texas, U.S.
- Spouse: Mary Elizabeth Shearn (m. 1840)
- Children: 9, including Edward
- Profession: Businessman

Thomas William House Sr. (March 4, 1814 – January 17, 1880) was a merchant, cotton factor, investor, banker, and politician in Houston, Texas. House started as a baker in New York and New Orleans, before establishing his own businesses in Houston. These businesses included a bakery and confectionary, a general dry goods store, cotton factorage, and bank. He was also a major investor and organizer of Houston-based transportation and utility companies. He traded cotton while evading naval blockades during the American Civil War.

== Early life ==
House was born on March 4, 1814, in Stoke St Gregory, Somerset, England.

== Career ==
=== Baker/confectioner ===
In May 1835, House emigrated to New York City. There, he became a successful pastry maker. Later House accepted an invitation from the owner of the St. Charles Hotel in New Orleans, Louisiana, to run the establishment's bakery.

In 1838, he opened his own store, House and Loveridge, a bakery and confectionary in Houston, Texas. The next year he formed a new partnership with Charles Shearn, later the chief justice of Harris County. The store produced and sold Houston's first ice cream. The new firm sold candy and dry goods, while buying and selling wholesale with people from the Texas hinterlands. House started offering factoring service around this time, exchanging store goods in exchange for cotton. The store took orders for staples, such as flour and sugar, but also iron castings and percussion caps. House imported goods from Boston, New Orleans, and New York, and made direct cotton shipments to Liverpool, England.

=== Transportation ===
In 1850, House was one of the founders of the Houston Plank Road Company, an early attempt to improve wagon transportation to and from the interior. The company raised $150,000 in capital, but it scuttled plans for building oaken-plank roads as the feasibility of railroads emerged.

In 1851, House helped to organize the steamboat company Houston and Galveston Navigation Company. Their steamboats carried not only freight, but passengers and U.S. mail. Other companies he worked with included the Texas Transportation Company, the Houston Direct Navigation Company, and the Buffalo Bayou Ship Channel Company.

=== Cotton factor ===
For a brief time, he had a second partnership with his father-in-law Shearn. Later, in 1853, House bought the cotton jobbing business of James H. Stevens and Company, a dealer in dry goods and groceries. He paid $40,000 for it. At the time, it was the largest sum of money to change hands in Houston's history. House renamed the company T.W. House and Company, and began extending loans to cotton planters. Edward Mather, an employee since 1841, was his "company". However, when Mather left in 1862, House was alone in business again. During the time they were together, T.W. House and Company became Texas's largest wholesaler. House prospered selling commodities ranging from hides to syrup and from guns to blacksmithing tools. Ox wagons would wait 12 hours for their goods to be loaded into his store. Out of his store, he built his great private bank.

By 1860, House was one of the three wealthiest Houstonians with William Marsh Rice and William J. Hutchins. House supported the Confederacy in the American Civil War. He helped to outfit local militia groups, including the Houston Light Guards, who were nicknamed the Kid Glove Gentry because of the kid gloves supplied by House. House exported cotton in exchange for cash or munitions. Relocating to Galveston during the war, House surveyed the blockading Union fleet movements. In this way House was able to direct his trading ships to evade the blockage, while also arranging overland transportation to and from Mexico.

=== Utilities, banking, and agriculture ===
House did not stop developing Houston after the Civil War. In 1866, he organized the Houston Gas Company, Houston's first public utility. House erected the plant and the mains at a time when the general public was indifferent. Gas first came to hotels and public places. Slowly, it came to private homes, and eventually gas street lamps were erected on the streets of Houston. He also helped organize the first street railway, the Board of Trade and Cotton Exchange, the Houston and Texas Central Railroad, along with many other railroads. In 1872, House purchased an extensive sugar plantation in Arcola. He also grew cotton. In La Salle County, he had a 70,000-acre (280 km^{2}) ranch.

== Public life ==
House was a founding member of the Protection Fire Company, and remained a member until his death. He served as an alderman of Houston in 1857 and 1862, and he was mayor of Houston, Texas in 1862.

== Personal life ==
Thomas and Mary House had a total of eight children, six of whom reached maturity.

Mary Shearn House, House's wife of thirty years, died in 1871.

== Death and legacy ==
House died on January 17, 1880 in San Antonio, where he had been convalescing. At his death, his estate of $500,000 made him one of the wealthiest people in Texas. The T.W. House Bank continued to operate after his death.

One of his sons, Edward M. House, became an adviser to Woodrow Wilson.

== Bibliography ==
- Bradley, Barrie Scardino (2020). Improbable Metropolis: Houston's Architectural and Urban History. Austin: University of Texas Press. ISBN 978-1477320198.
- Hall, Andrew W. (2014). Civil War Blockade Running on the Texas Coast. Charleston, SC: History Press. ISBN 978-1626195004.
- McComb, David G. (1981). Houston: A History (Revised ed.). Austin: University of Texas Press. ISBN 0-292-73020-9.
- Sibley, Marilyn McAdams (1962). The Port of Houston: A History. Austin: University of Texas Press.
- A History of Texas and Texans, Together with a Biographical Sketch of the Cities of Houston and Galveston. Chicago: Lewis Publishing Company. 1895.

Political offices
| Preceded by William J. Hutchins | Mayor of Houston; 1862 | Succeeded by William Anders |
