= Houston and Texas Central Railway =

Railway system in Texas

Overview
- Reporting mark: H&TC
- Locale: Texas
- Dates of operation: 1856–1934
- Successor: TNO

Technical
- Track gauge: 4 ft 8 1/2 in (1,435 mm) standard gauge
- Previous gauge: 5 ft 6 in (1,676 mm)

The Houston and Texas Central Railway (H&TC) was an 872-mile (1403-km) railway system chartered in Texas in 1848, with construction beginning in 1856. The line eventually stretched from Houston northward to Dallas and Denison, Texas, with branches to Austin and Waco.

== History ==
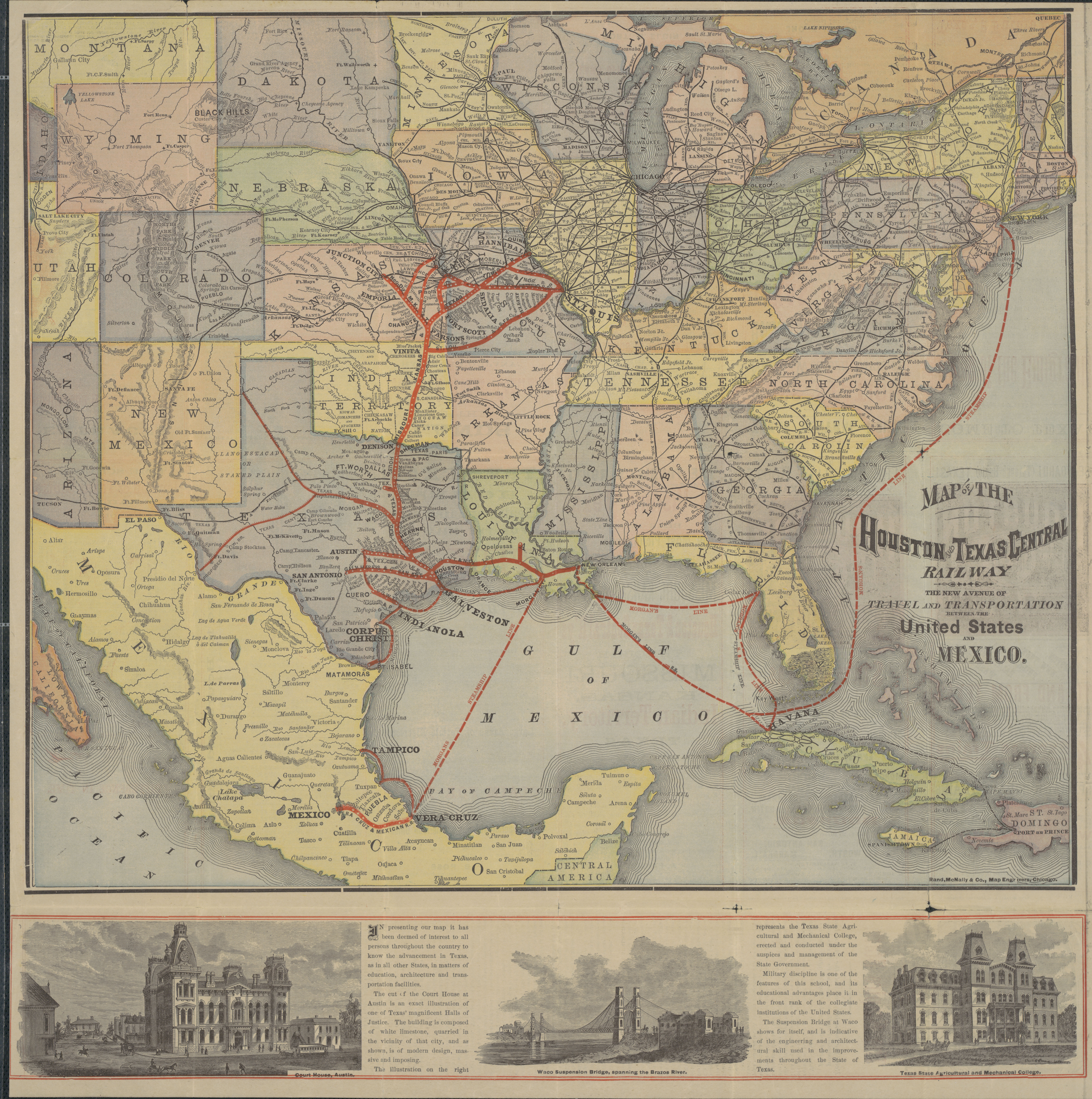
1880 map of the Houston and Texas Central Railway

Ebenezer Allen of Galveston, Texas obtained the charter to establish a railroad company on March 11, 1848. Other investors included Paul Bremond, Thomas William House, Sr., William J. Hutchins, Francis Moore, Benjamin A. Shepherd, James H. Stevens, William Marsh Rice, and William Van Alstyne. A series of meetings about the establishment of the company took place in Chappell Hill and Houston. In 1852, the Galveston and Red River Railway (G&RR) company became active.

Construction started on January 1, 1853, when Bremond and House broke ground in Houston. Track-laying of the 5 ft 6 in (1,676 mm) gauge railroad began in early 1856. By July 26 tracks had reached the 25-mile (40 km) point, at Cypress. The railroad company name was changed from G&RR to H&TC on September 1, 1856. By April 22, 1861, railroad construction had reached the 81-mile (130 km) point at Millican. The construction was halted because of the Civil War. In 1867, with the war over, construction resumed.

In 1867, the H&TC railroad company took control of the Washington County Railroad (1856–1868). That railroad had 25 miles (40 km) of railroad line with a gauge of 5 feet 6 inches between Brenham, Texas and Hempstead, Texas, which had been chartered in 1856 and completed in April 1861. The H&TC completed the line to Austin on December 25, 1871.

H&TC rails reached Corsicana in 1871, Dallas in 1872, and Red River City, Texas (now Denison) in 1873, where it connected with the Missouri, Kansas and Texas Railroad. This formed the first all-railroad route from Houston to St. Louis, Missouri, and the Eastern United States for freight and passengers. The railway line was sold to Charles Morgan in March 1877.

The Houston and Texas Central Railway Company entered receivership on February 23, 1885; the Main Line and the Western Division were sold to the Houston and Texas Central Railroad Company on April 1, 1890. The Waco and Northwestern Division remained in receivership until it was sold on September 5, 1895. It was acquired by the Houston and Texas Central Railroad on June 30, 1898.

The H&TC Railroad continued to operate independently until 1927, when it was leased to the Texas and New Orleans Railroad, a subsidiary of the Southern Pacific Railroad. The HT&C was merged into the T&NO in 1934. The T&NO was merged into the SP in 1961, and the SP into the Union Pacific in 1996.

U.S. Route 75 was built on the H&TC right of way northeasterly from Downtown Dallas to Elsworth Avenue. This highway locally is called North Central Expressway in homage of the Houston & Texas CENTRAL line. Dallas Area Rapid Transit purchased the track from Elsworth Avenue to Plano in 2012 for commuter-train service. North of Plano's Parker Road Station, the abandoned right-of-way continues to McKinney, Texas.

== See also ==
- Confederate railroads in the American Civil War
- List of Texas railroads
- Mexia-Nelleva Cutoff

== Impressions of 1891 ==
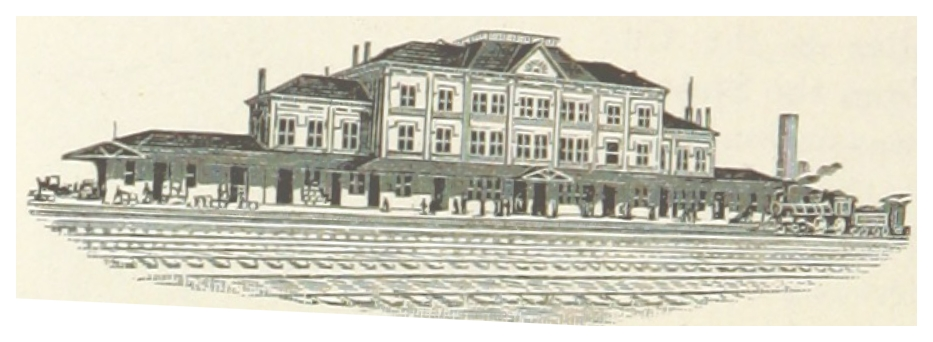
Houston, H&TC Depot, (c. 1890)

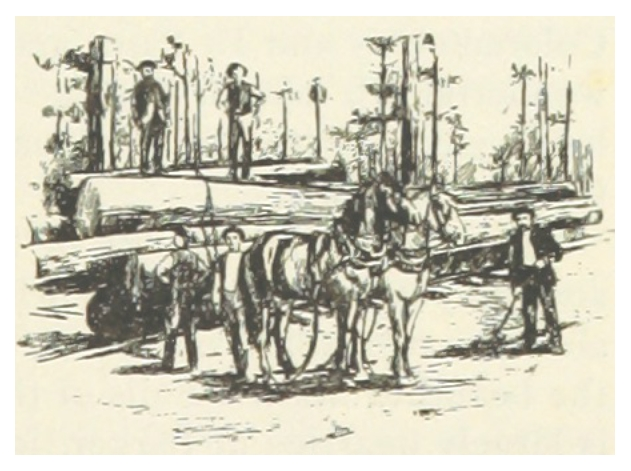
Cutting timber at the Line of the H&TC

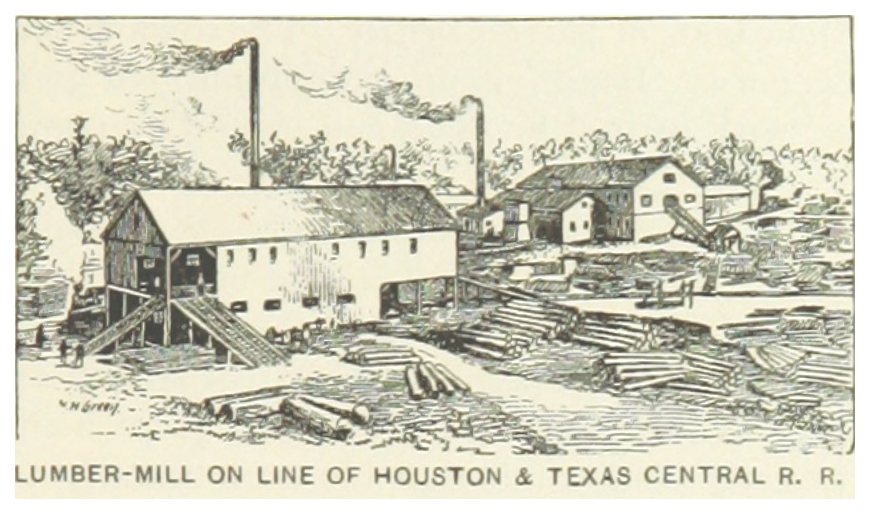
Lumber Mill at the Line of the H&TC

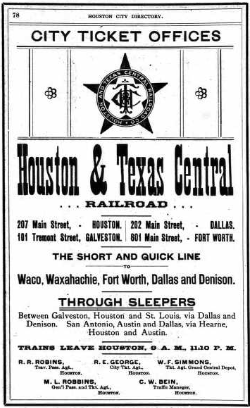
Advertisement, 1894
