= Iola High School (Texas) =

Location
- 7282 Fort Worth Street; Iola, Texas 77861; United States; 30.767292°N 96.072185°W

Information
- School type: Public high school
- School district: Iola Independent School District
- Principal: Brian Fowler
- Staff: 31.83 (FTE)
- Grades: 7-12
- Enrollment: 316 (2023-2024)
- Student to teacher ratio: 9.93
- Colors: Maroon, white, and black
- Athletics conference: UIL Class 2A
- Mascot: Bulldog
- Website: Iola High School

Iola High School is a public high school located in Iola, Texas (USA) and classified as a 2A school by the UIL. It is a part of the Iola Independent School District located in northwest Grimes County. In 2015, the school was rated "Met Standard" by the Texas Education Agency.

== Athletics ==
The Iola Bulldogs compete in these sports:

- Baseball
- Basketball
- Football
- Softball
- Track and field
- Volleyball

=== State titles ===
- Volleyball
  - 2015(2A)
  - 2016(2A)
  - 2020(2A)
  - 2023(2A)
  - 2025(2A/D2)
  - 2026(2A/D1)

==== State finalist ====
- Baseball
  - 2026(2A/D1)
- Volleyball
  - 2007(1A), 2008(1A), 2011(1A), 2024(2A/D2)
