= Bremond, Texas =

- City
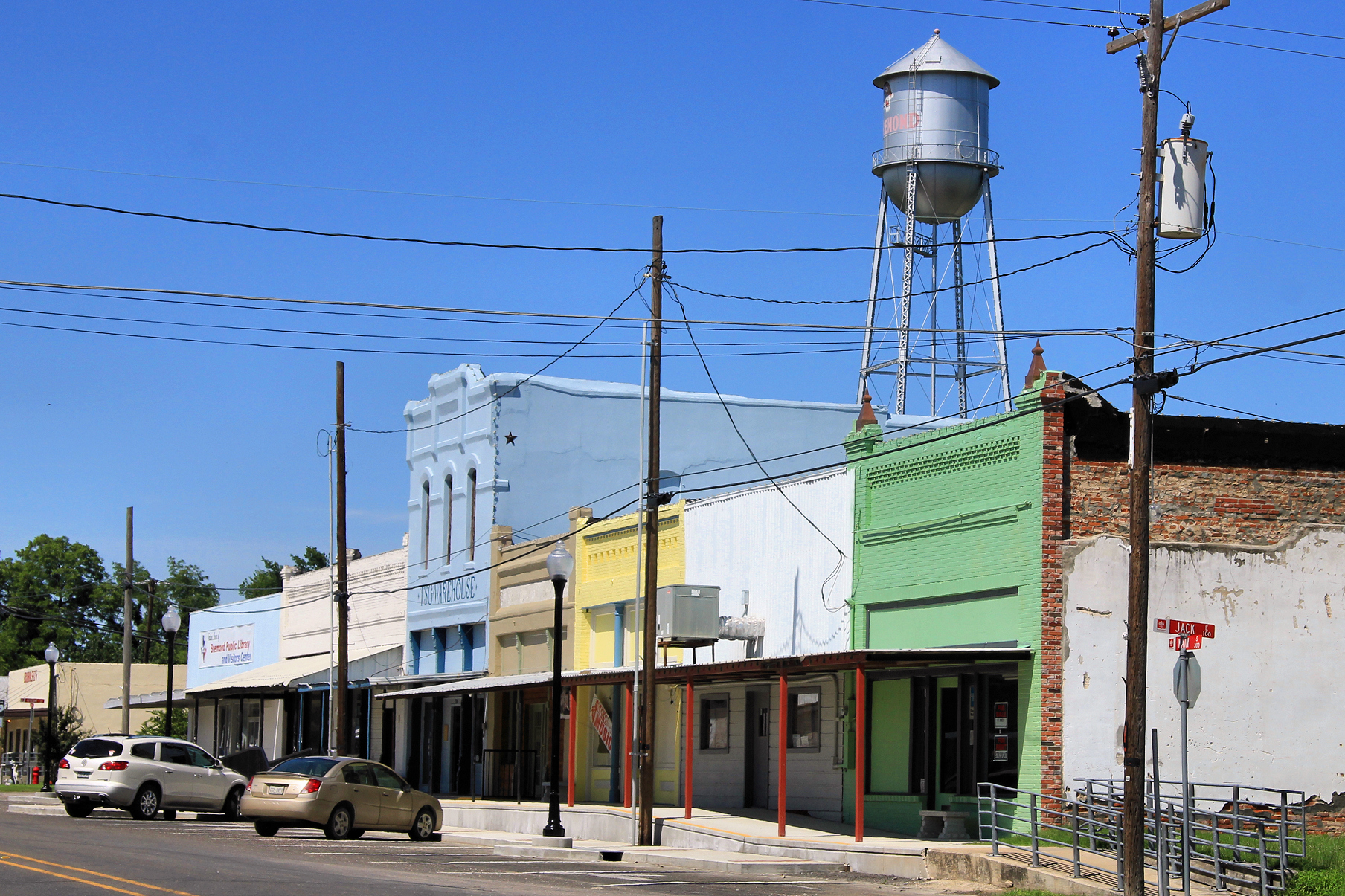
- Downtown Bremond (2015)
- Interactive map of Bremond, Texas
- Coordinates: 31°09′57″N 96°40′34″W
- Country: United States
- State: Texas
- County: Robertson

Area
  - Total: 0.88 sq mi (2.29 km^{2})
  - Land: 0.88 sq mi (2.29 km^{2})
  - Water: 0 sq mi (0.00 km^{2})
- Elevation: 459 ft (140 m)

Population (2020)
  - Total: 858
  - Density: 1,090.4/sq mi (421.02/km^{2})
- Time zone: UTC-6 (Central (CST))
  - Summer (DST): UTC-5 (CDT)
- ZIP code: 76629
- Area code: 254
- FIPS code: 48-10144
- GNIS feature ID: 2409900
- Website: cityofbremondtx.com

Bremond (/ˈbriːmɒnd/ BREE-mond) is a city in Robertson County, Texas, United States. The population was 858 at the 2020 census.

== History ==
Bremond is named for Paul Bremond (1810–1885), entrepreneur and founder of the Houston, East and West Texas Railroad 1875, who owned the surrounding land. Years later, the new owner, cotton baron William Marsh Rice, whose first wife was Bremond's daughter, Margaret, had the town surveyed and named after Bremond. The town was incorporated in 1870. In the 1870s a large number of Polish immigrants came to the area to grow cotton. Bremond holds an annual festival yearly to celebrate its Polish heritage.

In 1878, local resident Francis Marion Wootan discovered that the local water had a high mineral content. Following a popular trend at the time, Wootan began bottling the water and marketing it for its curing properties. Wootan Wells soon became a popular resort community, with four hotels and hundreds of support staff. (See also Mineral Wells, Texas)

In 1916, fire devastated the community, dealing a heavy blow to Wootan Wells also. Flooding and drought also contributed to the decline of the town, and in 1921 another fire shut down Wootan Wells permanently.

Texas Highway 6 was once routed through Bremond coming into town with Texas Highway 14 and took a sharp turn to the left in the town onto what is now Farm to Market Road 46. Highway 6 was later realigned and bypassed Bremond to the west. Where Texas Highway 6 intersects Farm to Market Road 46 if you look to the right coming south and to the left going north you can still see part of the curve that the original highway made to go into Bremond from the north.

== Geography ==
According to the United States Census Bureau, the city has a total area of 0.9 square miles (2.3 km^{2}), all land.

== Demographics ==
Historical population
Census	Pop.	Note	%±
1880	758		—
1890	387		−48.9%
1940	1,106		—
1950	1,141		3.2%
1960	803		−29.6%
1970	822		2.4%
1980	1,025		24.7%
1990	1,110		8.3%
2000	876		−21.1%
2010	929		6.1%
2020	858		−7.6%
U.S. Decennial Census

Bremond is part of the Bryan-College Station metropolitan area.

=== 2020 census ===
As of the 2020 census, Bremond had a population of 858 and 217 families. The median age was 43.5 years, with 24.1% of residents under the age of 18 and 22.0% of residents 65 years of age or older. For every 100 females there were 100.0 males, and for every 100 females age 18 and over there were 95.5 males age 18 and over.

0% of residents lived in urban areas, while 100.0% lived in rural areas.

There were 352 households in Bremond, of which 32.7% had children under the age of 18 living in them. Of all households, 38.4% were married-couple households, 22.2% were households with a male householder and no spouse or partner present, and 32.4% were households with a female householder and no spouse or partner present. About 32.7% of all households were made up of individuals and 15.1% had someone living alone who was 65 years of age or older.

There were 473 housing units, of which 25.6% were vacant. Among occupied housing units, 58.0% were owner-occupied and 42.0% were renter-occupied. The homeowner vacancy rate was 4.5% and the rental vacancy rate was 12.0%.

Bremond racial composition as of 2020 (NH = Non-Hispanic) (Note: Note: the US Census treats Hispanic/Latino as an ethnic category. This table excludes Latinos from the racial categories and assigns them to a separate category. Hispanics/Latinos can be of any race.)
Race	Number	Percentage
White (NH)	566	65.97%
Black or African American (NH)	173	20.16%
Asian (NH)	13	1.52%
Some Other Race (NH)	1	0.12%
Mixed/Multi-Racial (NH)	39	4.55%
Hispanic or Latino	66	7.69%
Total	858	

Racial composition as of the 2020 census
Race	Percent
White	69.6%
Black or African American	20.4%
American Indian and Alaska Native	0%
Asian	1.5%
Native Hawaiian and Other Pacific Islander	0%
Some other race	3.1%
Two or more races	5.4%
Hispanic or Latino (of any race)	7.7%

=== 2000 census ===
As of the census of 2000, there were 876 people, 359 households, and 230 families residing in the city. The population density was 966.7 inhabitants per square mile (373.2/km^{2}). There were 466 housing units at an average density of 514.2 per square mile (198.5/km^{2}). The racial makeup of the city was 82.65% White, 14.61% African American, 0.23% Native American, 0.23% Asian, 1.48% from other races, and 0.80% from two or more races. Hispanic or Latino of any race were 4.11% of the population.

There were 359 households, out of which 32.3% had children under the age of 18 living with them, 41.2% were married couples living together, 18.1% had a female householder with no husband present, and 35.7% were non-families. 33.1% of all households were made up of individuals, and 19.8% had someone living alone who was 65 years of age or older. The average household size was 2.28 and the average family size was 2.88.

In the city, the population was spread out, with 26.9% under the age of 18, 5.6% from 18 to 24, 23.4% from 25 to 44, 19.3% from 45 to 64, and 24.8% who were 65 years of age or older. The median age was 40 years. For every 100 females, there were 86.4 males. For every 100 females age 18 and over, there were 78.3 males.

The median income for a household in the city was $27,054, and the median income for a family was $34,028. Males had a median income of $38,750 versus $21,719 for females. The per capita income for the city was $15,325. Below the poverty line were 19.5% of people, 18.0% of families, 23.1% of those under 18 and 27.2% of those over 64.

== Education ==
The City of Bremond is served by the Bremond Independent School District. Its mascot is a Tiger. As of the 2018–2019 school year, it had registered 487 students.

35.1% of students were considered at risk of dropping out of school. 3.5% of students were enrolled in bilingual and English language learning programs. Former schools in the city include the Bremond Colored High School (1920–1965).
