= Iola, Texas =

- City
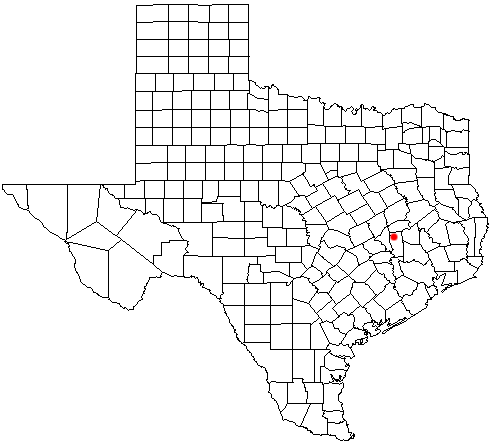
- Location of Iola in the state of Texas
- Coordinates: 30°46′19″N 96°04′38″W
- Country: United States
- State: Texas
- County: Grimes
- Incorporated: 2007

Area
  - Total: 1.03 sq mi (2.68 km^{2})
  - Land: 1.03 sq mi (2.67 km^{2})
  - Water: 0.0039 sq mi (0.01 km^{2})
- Elevation: 341 ft (104 m)

Population (2020)
  - Total: 311
  - Density: 302/sq mi (116/km^{2})
- Time zone: UTC-6 (Central (CST))
  - Summer (DST): UTC-5 (CDT)
- ZIP Code: 77861
- Area code: 936
- FIPS code: 48-36068
- GNIS feature ID: 2439046
- Website: cityofiola.myruralwater.com

Iola is a city in Grimes County, Texas, United States, on Farm to Market Road 39 and the Burlington-Rock Island Railroad, at the headwaters of Ragan Creek in northwestern Grimes County. As of the 2020 census the population was 311.

== History ==
On November 6, 2007, it became the fifth incorporated city in Grimes County after a residential vote.

Iola is believed to have been named for Edward Ariola, one of Stephen F. Austin's colonists who settled in the vicinity in 1836. In 1852 the community's first church, Zion Methodist, was constructed; the building also served as a schoolhouse. The settlement's first gristmill, Monroe's Gin, began operating during the 1860s. The post office opened in 1871 and, though discontinued the next year, was permanently reestablished in 1877. A Masonic Lodge was formed in 1876. By the 1880s the town had several churches, cotton gins, and gristmills. The population stood at 109 by 1890.

Between 1906 and 1907 both the Trinity and Brazos Valley Railway and the Houston and Texas Central Railway extended lines through Iola, and a new townsite was laid out along the tracks near the T&BV depot. A tap line of the Texas and New Orleans Railroad connected Iola with Navasota. The coming of the railroad invigorated the community. A print shop was established, and a newspaper appeared, the Iola Enterprise, edited and published by Rev. A. J. Frick, pastor of Zion Methodist Church. In 1909 the Iola State Bank was organized. The population reached 300 in 1910, and by 1936 the town had an estimated 500 people and twelve businesses.

After World War II the population declined somewhat to an estimated 300 in 1950. Since then it has remained virtually level. During the 1970s and 1980s several nearby oilfields opened. In 1990 Iola had a population estimated at 331 and twelve businesses. In 2000 the population remained the same, but there were 39 businesses.

== Geography ==
Iola is located in northwestern Grimes County between Bryan, 23 miles (37 km) to the southwest, and Huntsville, 36 miles (58 km) to the east. Navasota, the largest city in Grimes County, is 32 miles (51 km) to the south.

== Demographics ==
Historical population
Census	Pop.	Note	%±
2010	401		—
2020	311		−22.4%
U.S. Decennial Census; 2020 Census

=== 2020 census ===
As of the 2020 census, Iola had a population of 311. The median age was 49.3 years. 19.3% of residents were under the age of 18 and 22.8% of residents were 65 years of age or older. For every 100 females there were 94.4 males, and for every 100 females age 18 and over there were 91.6 males age 18 and over.

0.0% of residents lived in urban areas, while 100.0% lived in rural areas.

There were 142 households in Iola, of which 28.2% had children under the age of 18 living in them. Of all households, 47.2% were married-couple households, 17.6% were households with a male householder and no spouse or partner present, and 31.7% were households with a female householder and no spouse or partner present. About 31.0% of all households were made up of individuals and 14.0% had someone living alone who was 65 years of age or older.

There were 167 housing units, of which 15.0% were vacant. The homeowner vacancy rate was 3.3% and the rental vacancy rate was 3.4%.

Racial composition as of the 2020 census
Race	Number	Percent
White	256	82.3%
Black or African American	7	2.3%
American Indian and Alaska Native	1	0.3%
Asian	2	0.6%
Native Hawaiian and Other Pacific Islander	1	0.3%
Some other race	15	4.8%
Two or more races	29	9.3%
Hispanic or Latino (of any race)	50	16.1%

== Education ==
The Iola Independent School District has two campuses – Iola High School (Grades 7–12) and Iola Elementary School (Grades PK–6).

== Notable person ==
Chris Andersen, professional basketball player
