= Dalsa Cutoff =

The Dalsa Cutoff (short for Dallas-San Antonio Cutoff) is a 141-mile railroad line which runs from Hearne, Texas to Flatonia, Texas. One segment of the San Antonio and Aransas Pass Railway (SA&AP) lives on as part of the cutoff - the section between Giddings to Flatonia.
