= Paul Bremond =

American railroad entrepreneur

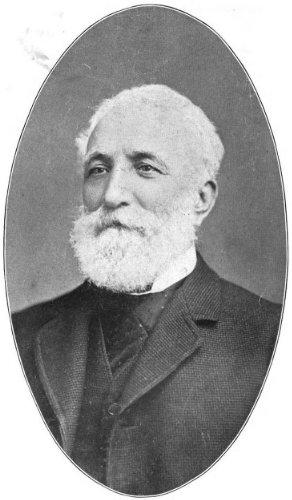
- Born: October 11, 1810; New York City
- Died: May 8, 1885 (aged 74); Galveston, Texas
- Burial place: Glenwood Cemetery, Houston
- Citizenship: United States; Republic of Texas
- Occupations: Investor, railroad executive
- Known for: Houston and Texas Central Railroad; Houston, East and West Railway
- Spouse(s): Harriet Martha Sprouls (m. 1831–1846); Mary E. Van Alstyne (m. c. 1847–1864); Mary Louise de Valernes (m. 1870)
- Relatives: William Marsh Rice (son-in-law)

Paul Bremond (October 11, 1810 – May 8, 1885) was an American businessman. He was a hatter, doing business in New York City and Philadelphia, and from 1840, a commission merchant in Galveston, in the Republic of Texas.

From the 1850s until 1885, Bremond was a railroad entrepreneur. He co-founded the Galveston and Red River Railroad, later known as the Houston and Texas Central Railroad, and he served as the company's top executive until 1858. Bremond believed that Moseley Baker was his "spirit guide," and led him to establish the Houston, East and West Railway. He was the president and principal of this railroad until his death in 1885.

== Early life ==
Paul Bremond was born October 11, 1810 in New York City to Dr. Paul Barlie Bremond and Catherine (Green) Bremond. When Paul was born, his father was still a recent emigrant from France, while his mother hailed from nearby Fishkill, New York. He was already working for a hat maker at the age of twelve, and was the co-owner of his own shop in New York City seven years later. He left the partnership the next year, and arrived in Philadelphia at the age of twenty.

== Career ==
=== Merchant ===
Bremond started his own shop in Philadelphia. In this new enterprise, he purchased assembled hats— "in the rough"—and finished them. After six years of selling hats, he may have made as much as $40,000 in profits, though he lost much of this wealth in the Panic of 1837.

By 1839 Bremond located to the new town of Galveston in the Republic of Texas. However, the ship carrying his possessions, the brig Virginia, ran aground and all of his personal property was lost. The next year, though, he started his own auction house, and also operated as a commission merchant. These ventures were profitable, and he invested the proceeds in various Texas businesses while forming business relationships with William Van Alstyne and William Marsh Rice.

=== Railroads ===
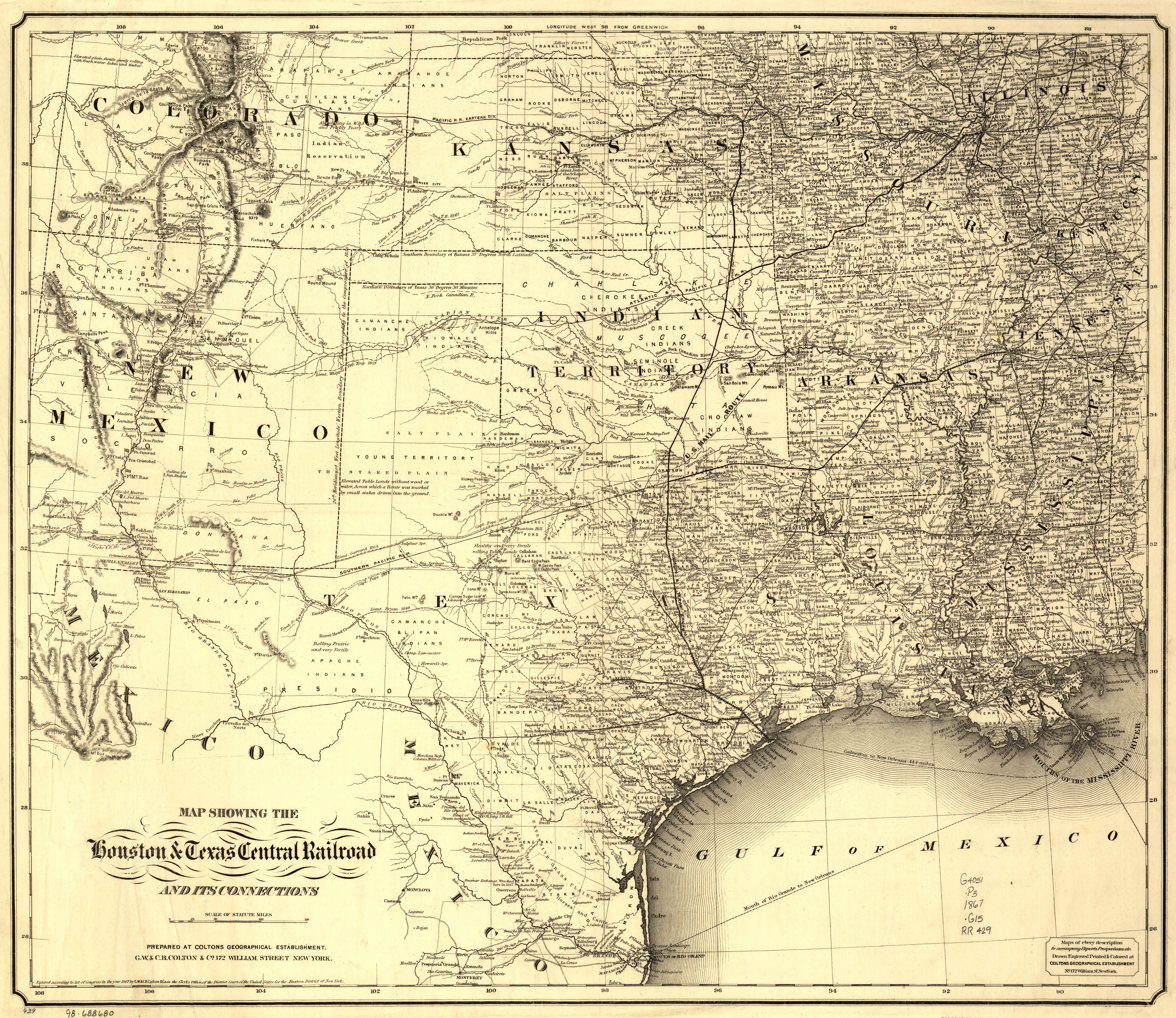
Map of Houston and Texas Central Railroad, 1867

Bremond focused new investment upon transportation enterprises by the 1850s. These first gambles on this business sector included a plank road from Houston to the Brazos Valley, and the Galveston and Red River Railroad. Though Bremond was from Galveston, he favored a segment running from Houston toward central Texas, and a diverse group of investors—including Ebenezer Allen (Texas politician), Thomas William House, Sr., William J. Hutchins, Francis Moore, Benjamin A. Shepherd, and James H. Stevens—joined Bremond, Rice, and Van Alstyne.

Service began between Houston and Cypress in 1856, just a year after construction started. An extension of the railroad was complete to Hempstead in 1858, and the railway was renamed the Houston and Texas Central Railroad. Bremond served as the company's president through 1858, though he persisted as an investor.

Bremond was an avowed spiritualist. He started his own spiritualist group in Houston, and claimed that his "spirit guide," Moseley Baker, gave him instructions from the grave to build a new railroad through the Piney Woods. In 1875, Bremond gained a charter from the state of Texas for the Houston, East and West Railway, with a grant to build as far north as the Red River (Texas). The charter also authorized the company to build branches through east Texas, with possible western routes to Laredo, Corpus Christi, and Waco. At an organization meeting of the nascent firm, Bremond was selected to serve as president. He was also the dominant shareholder among the incorporators, holding more shares than the combined stock owned by all others at the meeting. Construction began in Houston in 1876 at a junction of the Texas and New Orleans Railroad. Bremond opted for a narrow gauge railroad to be financed through his Texas land grants and from timber freight revenue.

Late in 1876, Bremond found his first two locomotives in Philadelphia, the Centennial and the Girard, which were transported over water to Texas. The new railroad project faced a great natural obstacle: the West Fork of the San Jacinto River. Bremond ordered a steel bridge from the Cincinnati Bridge Company, which was sent to the construction site via barge. The first twenty-mile segment was ready for operation to New Caney in April 1877. A year later track was extended another twenty-three miles to Cleveland, with daily service available to both towns and the five sawmills along the route. The railroad offered Sunday excursions to supplement its revenues.

Bremond insisted that additional investment in the railroad should be solicited from local sources, arguing that this would better align the interests of the railroad with those of the community. A half million dollars of the firm's original capital was invested by Bremond. By contrast, the other incorporators only placed small amounts of money at risk. So much of the railroad was associated with Bremond that it was commonly known as "Bremond's Road." Another indication of this association was his issuance of company drafts to himself and his family, drawing $150,000 from the company account and replacing $97,000 during one period. Bremond amassed land in twelve Texas counties on his own account, and transferred some of these acquisitions to the company to be used as right-of-way.

Bremond did not succeed in raising sufficient capital from local sources, and in 1878, he issued $1.3 million in first-mortgage bonds through Union Trust Company of New York City. After fees and commissions, this bond issue raised $1 million, enough to finish the railroad to Nacogdoches by 1883. The Houston, East and West Railway offered daily service on the 140-mile route between Houston and Nacogdoches.

In April 1882, The Texas legislature voided the Railroad Land Grant Law, ending the issuance of land certificates to developers of railroads. This implied losing one source of revenue to the company. In 1883, the Houston, East and West Railway had spent all capital from its first bond issue, and Bremond proposed another round of financing to the company directors. He obtained thirty-year financing for an additional $750,000 from Union Trust Bank, raising the company's total debt to $2 million. With this infusion of capital, the company built a viaduct over the Sabine River, taking the road into Louisiana.

== Personal life ==
Bremond married three times. In 1831, he married Harriet Martha Sprouls (died 1846), a native of New York City. Their only son, Edward, served as head of the Houston Fire Department. After 1846, Bremond married Mary E. Van Alstyne, with whom he had five daughters. He was widowed a second time, and he wedded Viscountess Mary Louise de Valernes in 1870.

Margaret Bremond, daughter of Paul and Harriet, married William Marsh Rice in 1850.

== Death and legacy ==
Bremond died in Galveston on May 8, 1885, and was interred at Houston's Glenwood Cemetery. He was survived by Mary Louise Bremond, who inherited his shares in the Houston, East and West Railway. His son, Edmund, was appointed as a company director. Though the Houston Post estimated Bremond's wealth at over $2 million upon his death, his lost money in the Houston and Texas Central Railroad, and in the Houston, East and West Railway.

Bremond is the namesake of Bremond, Texas, as well as the namesake of streets in several Texas towns.
