= Bremond Block Historic District =

Historic district in Texas, United States

- U.S. National Register of Historic Places
- U.S. Historic district
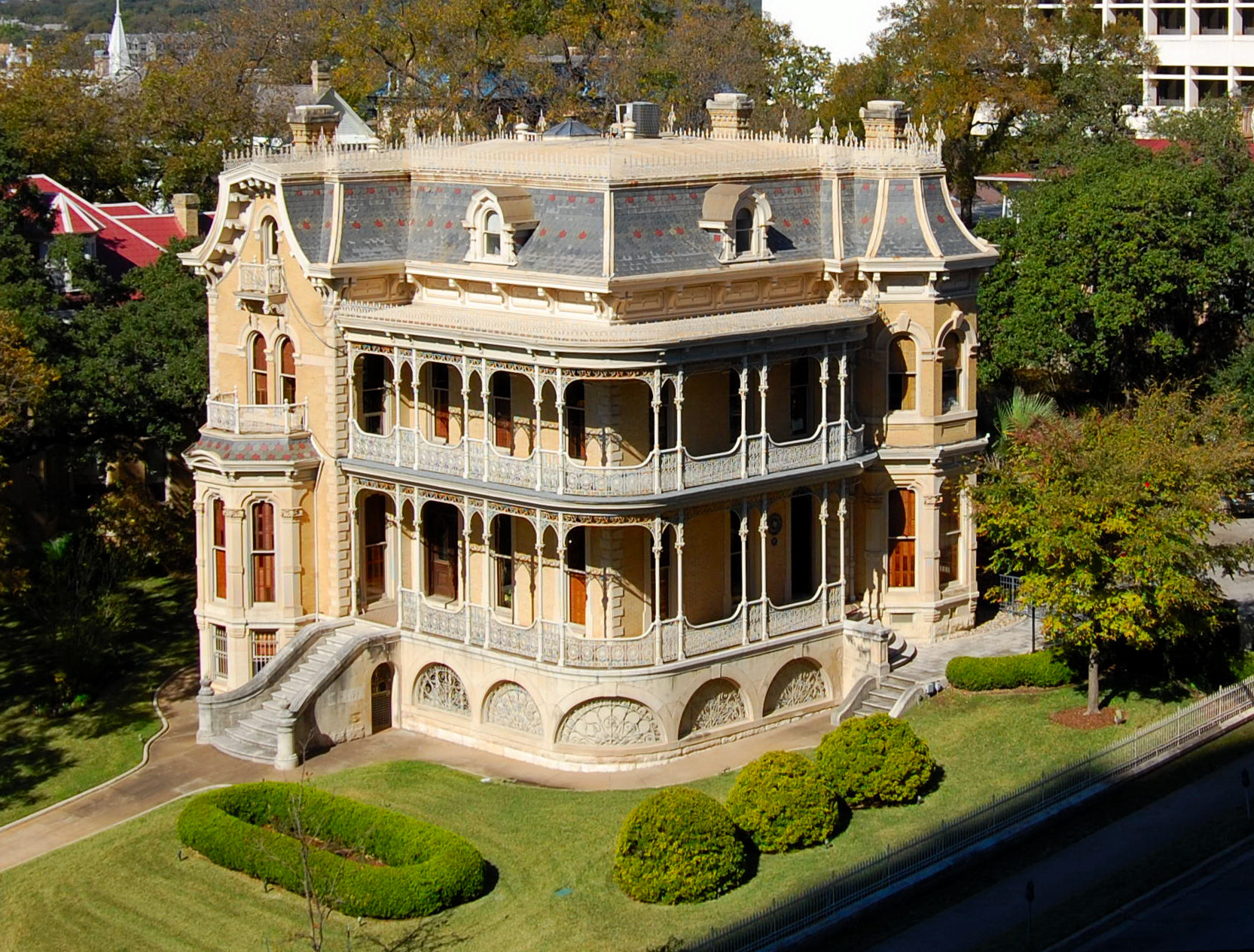
- The John Bremond House in 2007
- Location: Austin, TX
- Coordinates: 30°16′14″N 97°44′47″W
- Built: 1870
- Architect: Fiegel, George; Bremond, Eugene
- Architectural style: Greek Revival, Late Victorian
- NRHP reference No.: 70000764
- Added to NRHP: April 3, 1970

The Bremond Block Historic District is a collection of eleven historic homes in downtown Austin, Texas, United States, constructed from the 1850s to 1910.

== History ==
The Bremond Block Historic District was added to National Register of Historic Places in 1970, and is considered one of the few remaining upper-class Victorian neighborhoods of the middle to late nineteenth century in Texas. Six of these houses were built or expanded for members of the families of brothers Eugene and John Bremond, who were prominent in late-nineteenth-century Austin social, merchandising, and banking circles. They are located within the square block bordered by West Seventh, West Eighth, Guadalupe, and San Antonio streets. The district also includes several houses on the west side of San Antonio and the south side of West Seventh, at least three of which were built or altered by the North family. The John and Pierre Bremond houses are currently owned by the Texas Classroom Teachers Association, and the John Bremond house serves as the headquarters for the association. TCTA website

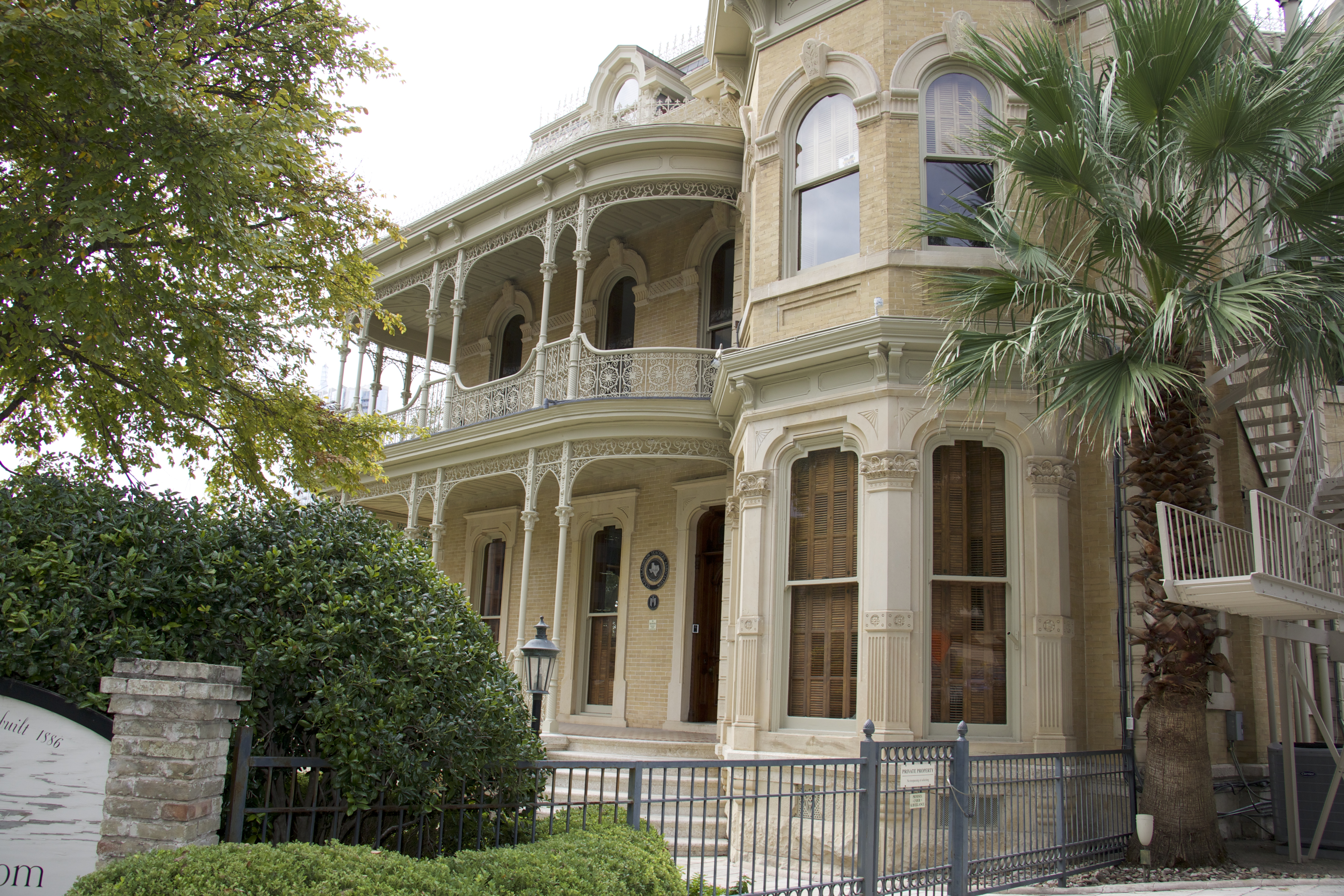
The John Bremond House, Austin, TX

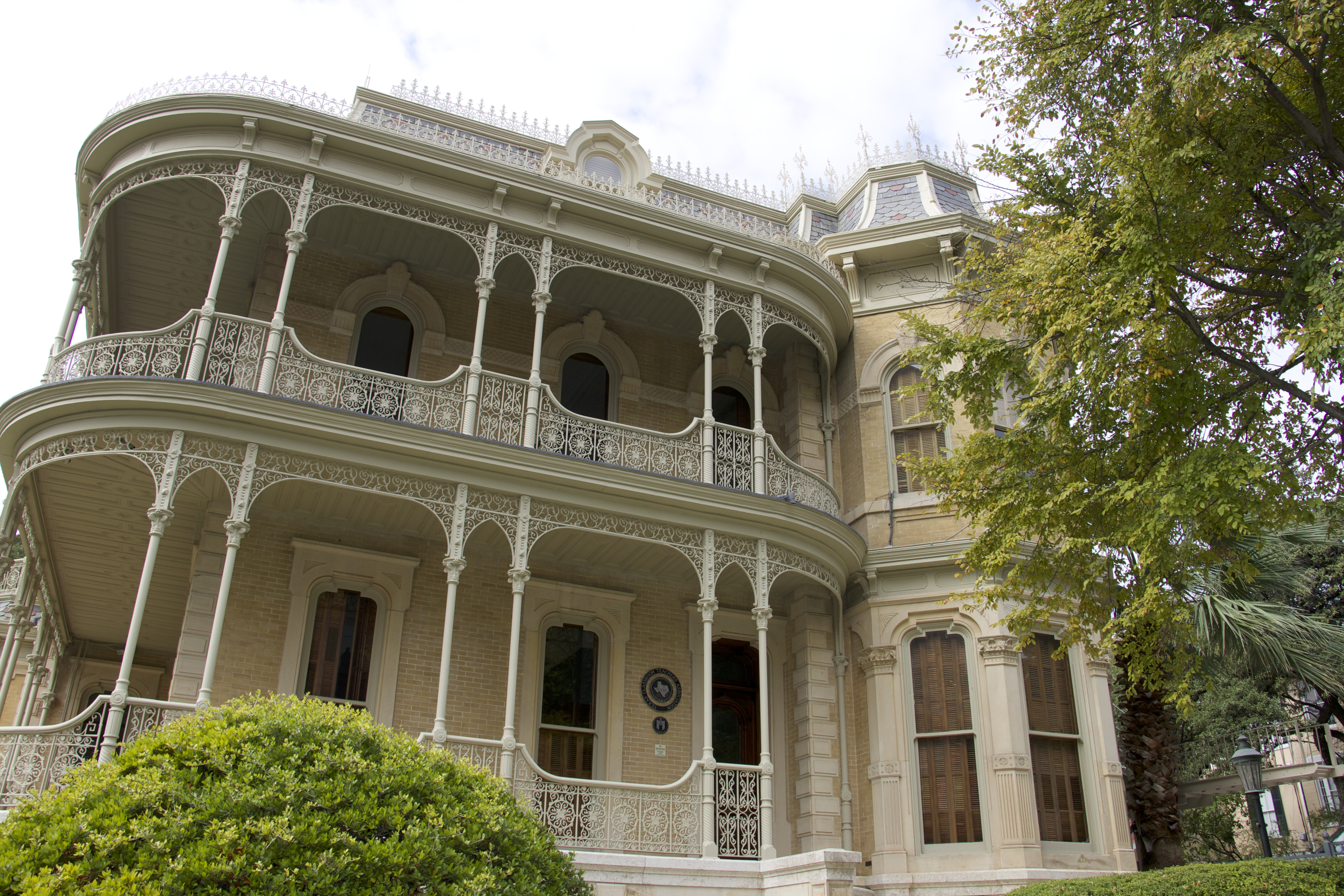
The John Bremond House, Austin, TX

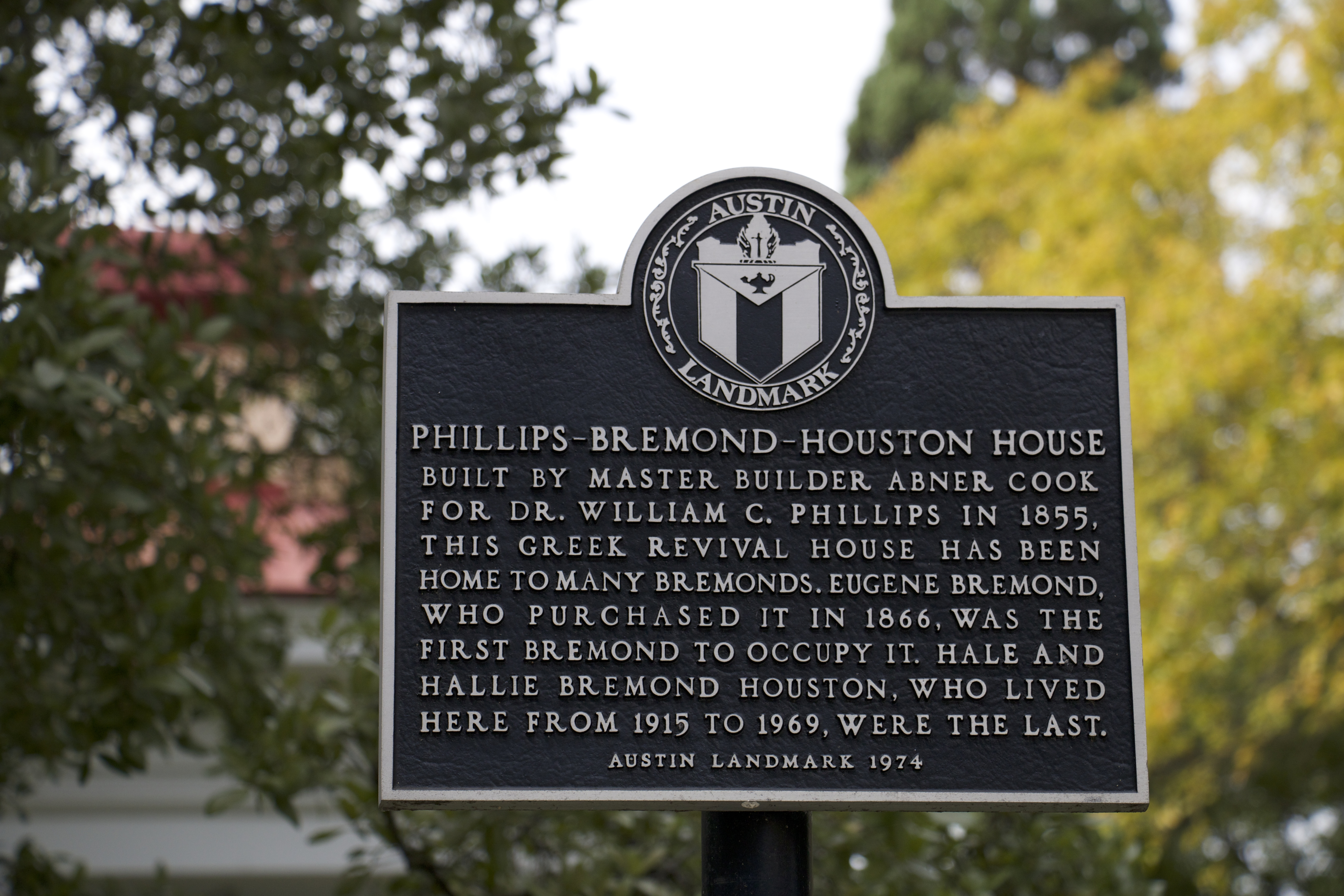
The Phillips-Bremond-Houston House, Austin, TX

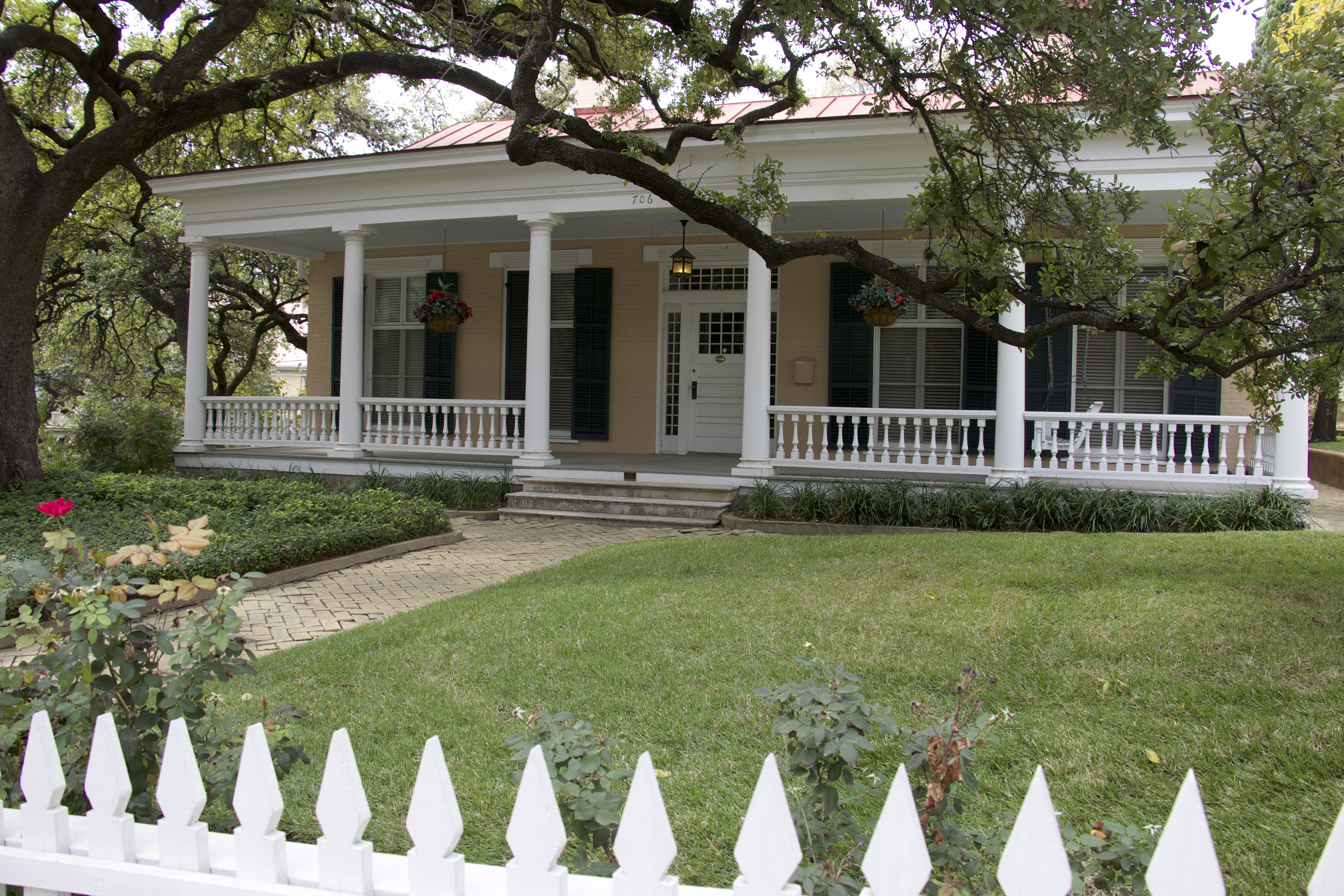
The Phillips-Bermond-Houston House, Austin, TX

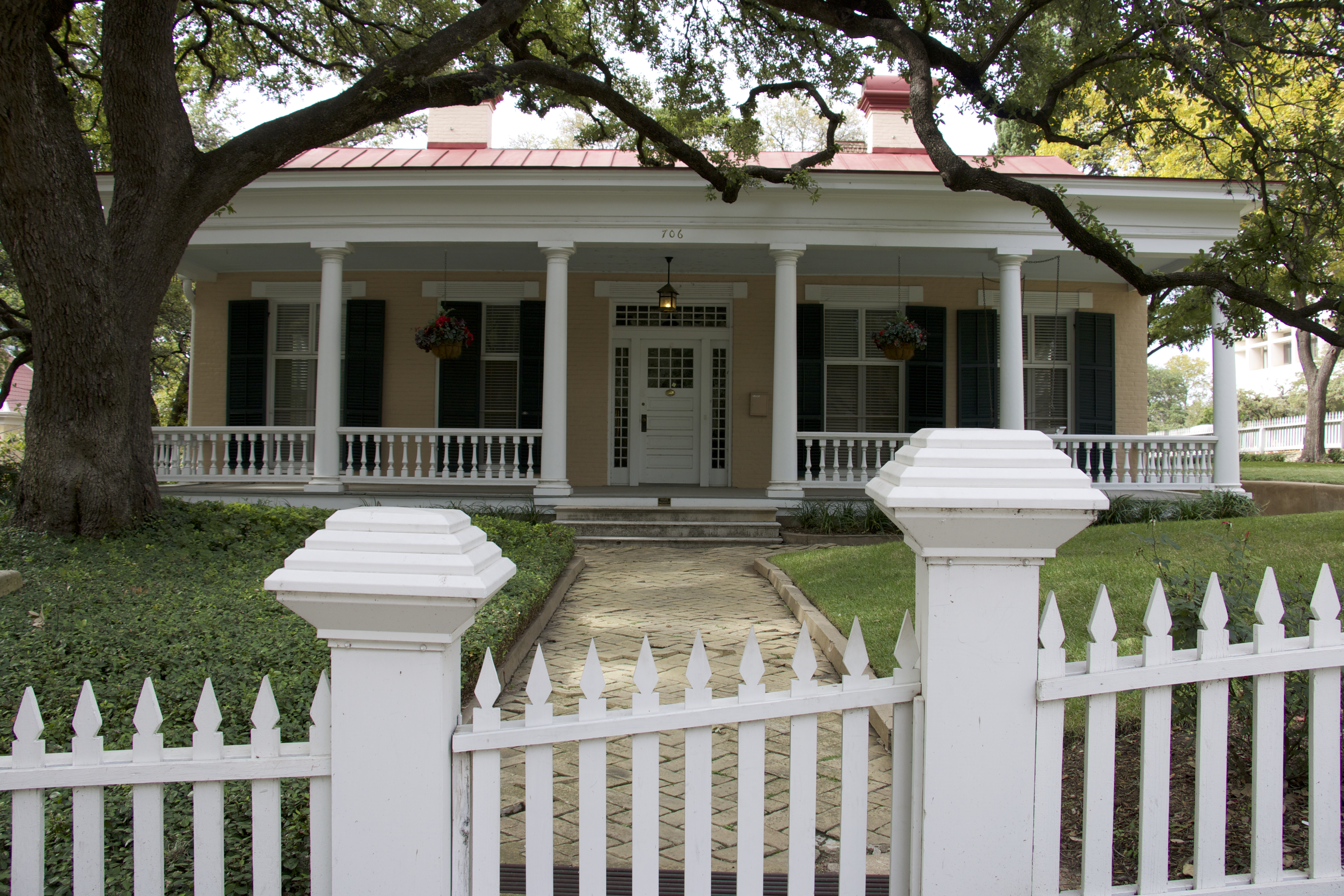
The Phillips-Bermond-Houston House, Austin, TX

== Buildings in the Bremond Block Historic District ==
The historic district consists of eleven structures.

| Name | Built | Renovated | Address |
|---|---|---|---|
| James T. Brown House | 1858 | | 610 Guadalupe St |
| John Bremond, Jr. House | 1886 | | 700 Guadalupe St |
| Phillips-Bremond-Houston House | 1854 | | 706 Guadalupe St |
| Pierre Bremond House | 1898 | | 402 W 7th St |
| Eugene Bremond House | 1873 | | 404 W 7th St |
| North Flats-Howson House | 1879 | 2007 | 700 San Antonio St |
| William Franklin North Apartment | 1910 | | 702 San Antonio St |
| Catherine Robinson House | 1891 | | 705 San Antonio St |
| North Cottage | 1879 | | 706 San Antonio St |
| North-Evans Château/Austin Women's Club | 1874 | 1894 | 708 San Antonio St |
| Walter Bremond House | 1872 | 1887–1888 | 711 San Antonio St |

=== North-Evans Château (1874) ===
The North-Evans Château was originally completed in 1874 and is located on San Antonio Street. The building is constructed from rough, limestone blocks. Alfred Giles renovated and enlarged the building in 1894, "into a late Victorian castle, with crenellation, Romanesque arcades in many galleries, a tower, and high terraces with huge buttressed retaining walls."

Also known as Chateau Bellevue, the house was acquired by the Austin Women's Club in November 1929 and still the headquarters of the club as of April 2025. In 2024, the club celebrated the sesquecentennial of the chateau.

=== John Bremond House (1886) ===
The John Bremond House is located at 700 Guadalupe Street in Austin and was completed in 1886. The design of the two-story house was probably executed by George Fiegel, a local architect, originally from New Orleans. Fiegel, however, probably drew his inspiration from an architectural pattern book last published by A. J. Bicknell in 1878, titled, Village Builder and Supplement. Several cast-iron ornaments of the Bremond House resemble designs represented in the Bicknell pattern book, including decorative elements of the balconies and roof crests. The asymmetrical facade of the Bremond House includes a design of the single, as well as the interface of the bay with the mansard roof. These features also appear to be borrowed from Bicknell.

== Gallery ==
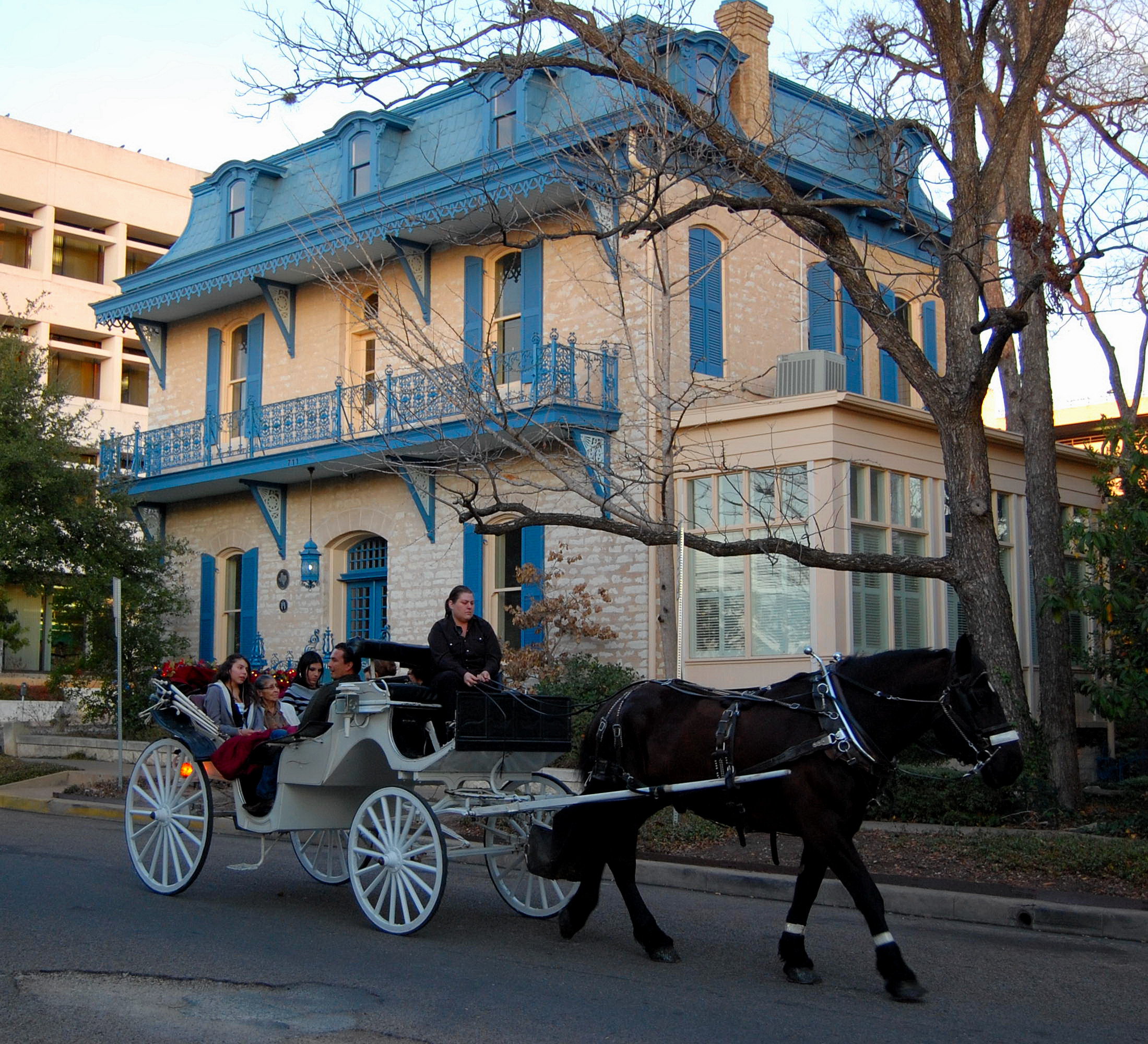
1. Walter Bremond House

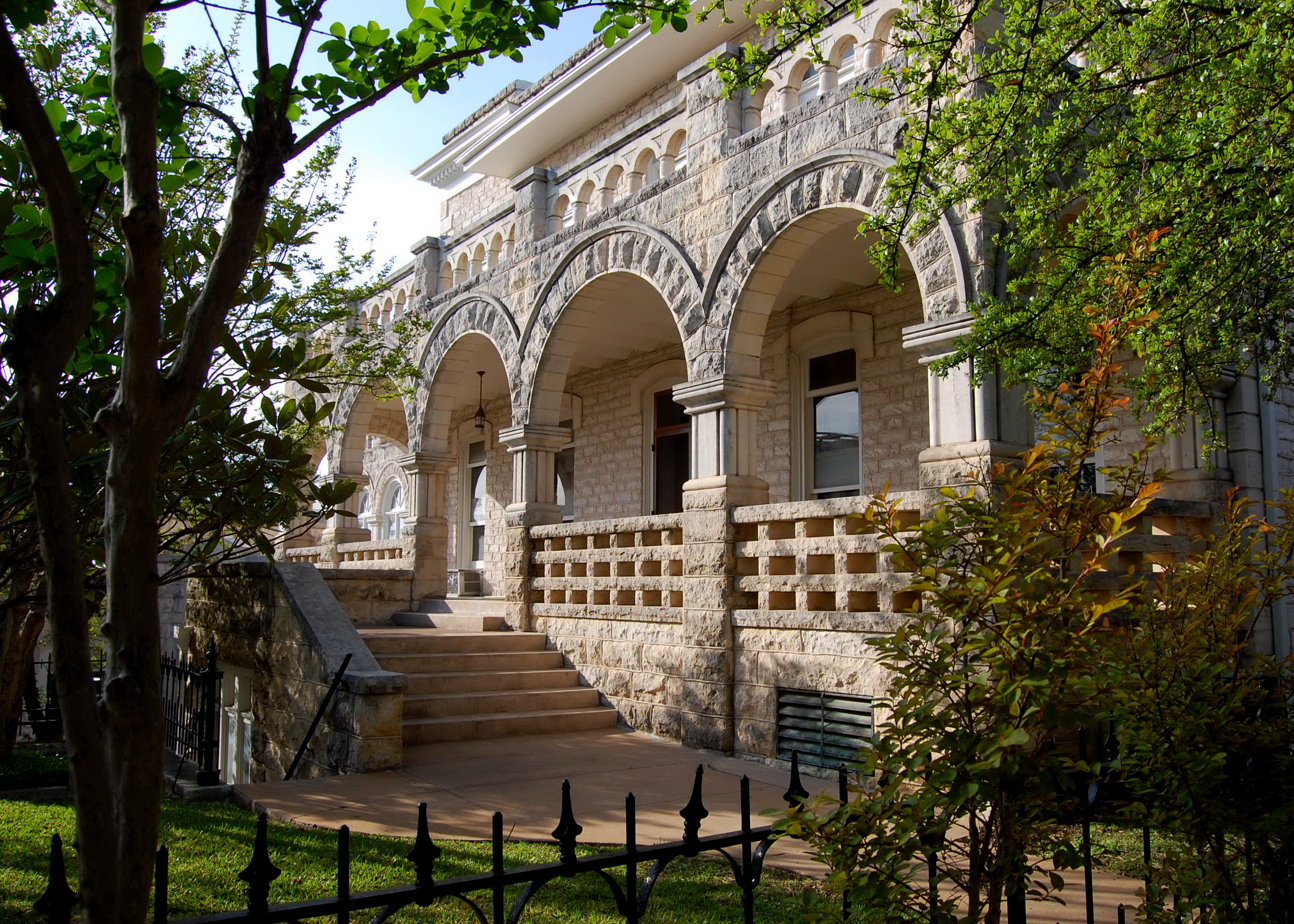
2. North-Evans Chateau

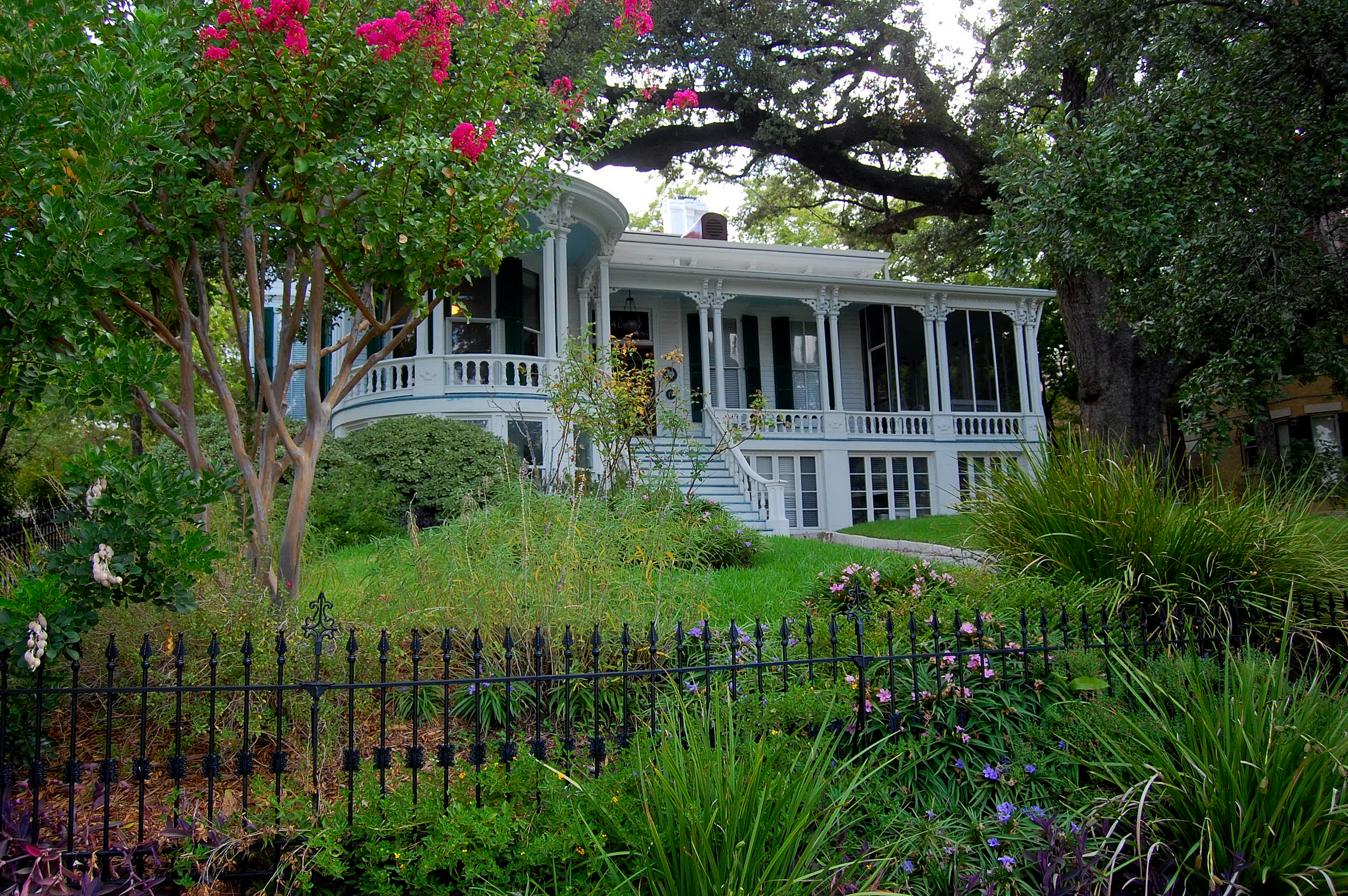
3. Eugene Bremond House

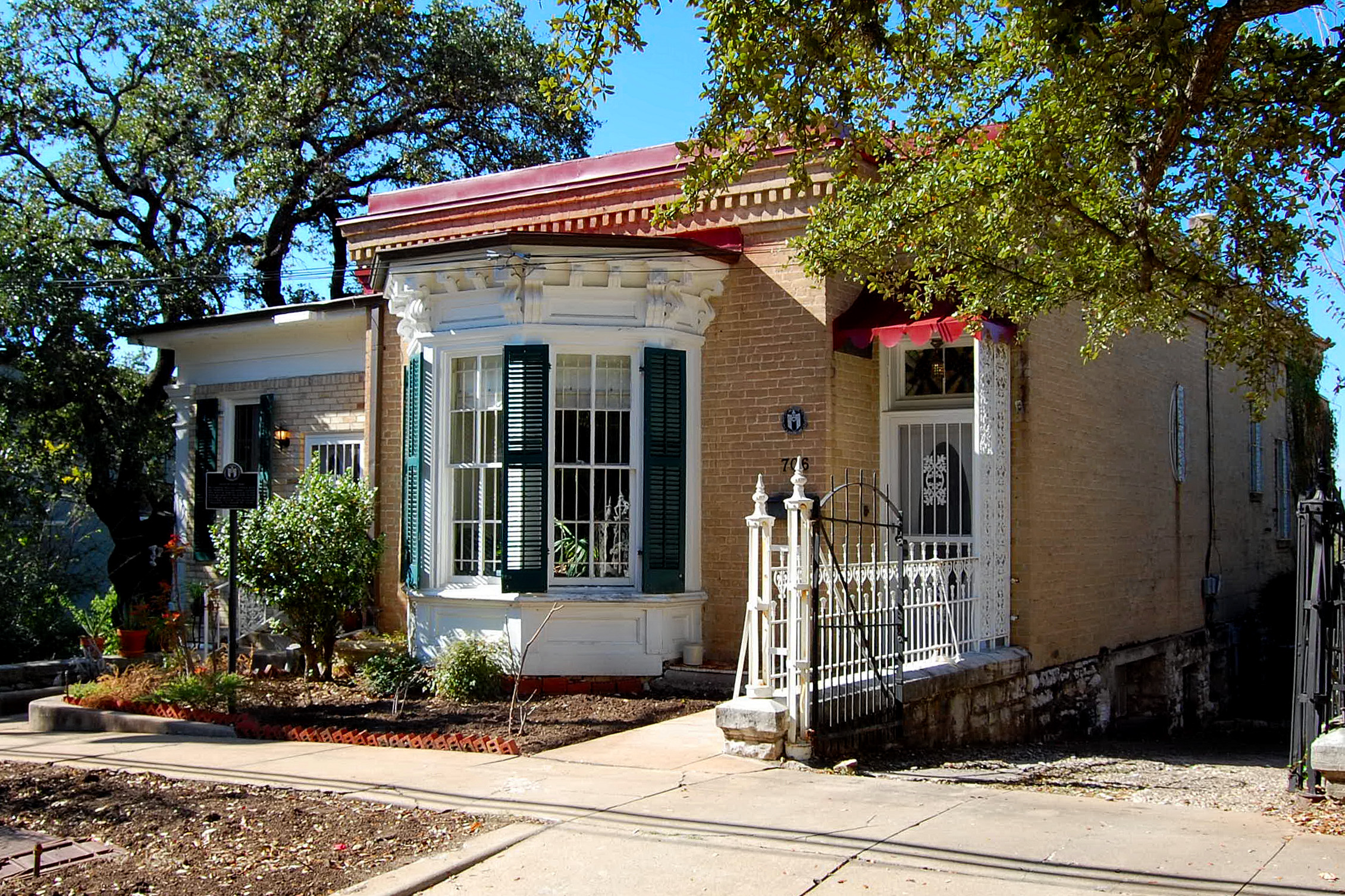
4. North Cottage

== Bibliography ==
- Culbertson, Margaret (1999). Texas Houses Built by the Book: The Use of Published Designs, 1850–1925. College Station, TX: Texas A&M University Press. ISBN 0-89096-863-2.
