= William J. Hutchins =

Texas entrepreneur and Mayor of Houston

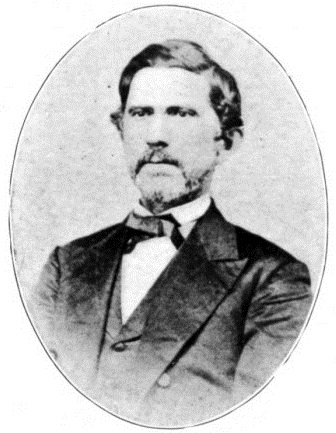
- William J. Hutchins, Mayor of Houston

18th Mayor of Houston Texas
- In office 1861–1862
- Preceded by: Thomas W. Whitmarsh
- Succeeded by: Thomas William House Sr.

Personal details
- Born: March 3, 1813 Fishkill, New York
- Died: June 4, 1884 (aged 71) Fort Worth, Texas
- Occupation: Railway investor
- Known for: Mayor of Houston Texas, Railways

William J. Hutchins (March 3, 1813 – June 4, 1884) was a businessman and a Mayor of Houston Texas.

== Early life ==
Hutchins was born in Dutchess County, New York. He spent most of his childhood in New Bern, North Carolina, where he stayed until the age of twenty-two. In 1835, he relocated to Tallahassee, establishing himself as a merchant for three years before selling his interest. He arrived in Houston,Texas in 1838, after the town was established as the capital of the Republic of Texas. He worked there as a merchant.

== Business career ==
In addition to his activities as a commission merchant, Hutchins invested in several infrastructure development companies. He co-founded the Houston Plank Road Company; Houston Navigation Company; the Buffalo Bayou Ship Channel Company; and the Buffalo Bayou, Brazos, and Colorado Railway—the first railroad to operate in Texas.

Around 1860, Hutchins started construction of a new four-story, brick building on the site of the old City Hotel (1837–1859). Finally completed after the Civil War, the Hutchins House was open until it burned in the early 1900s.

Hutchins served variously as a director, owner, and president of the Houston and Texas Central Railway. He and a partner purchased the railroad at auction in 1861 for $10,000. Hutchins purchased the Houston Tap and Brazoria Railway at auction in 1869 for $500.

Hutchins was vice-president of the Houston Insurance Company.

According to the 1860 Census, Hutchins estimated his assets at $700,000 (equivalent to $25.1 million today), the second largest estate in Houston.

== Political career ==
Hutchins served as Alderman for Houston's Second Ward for several terms. He also served a single term as Mayor of Houston Texas in 1861. During the Civil War, he headed the Texas Cotton Board, charged with collecting cotton for the Confederate States and getting it to foreign markets in exchange for supplies and war materials.

Hutchins, Texas was named in his honor.

Preceded by Thomas W. Whitmarsh	Mayor of Houston, Texas; 1861–1862	Succeeded by Thomas William House
