= Bremond Independent School District =

School district in Texas, United States

Location
- 601 W. Collins St. Bremond, Texas ESC Region 6 USA
- Coordinates: 31°10′10″N 96°40′51″W

District information
- Type: Independent school district
- Grades: Pre-K through 12
- Superintendent: Daryl Stuard, Sr.
- Schools: 1
- NCES District ID: 4812540

Students and staff
- Students: 147 (2023–2024)
- Teachers: 18.00 (on an FTE basis) (2023–2024)
- Staff: 21.90 (on an FTE basis) (2023–2024)
- Student–teacher ratio: 8.17 (2023–2024)
- Athletic conference: UIL Class 2A Football Division II
- District mascot: Tigers
- Colors: Red, White

Other information
- TEA District Accountability Rating for 2011–12: Recognized
- Website: www.bremondisd.net

Bremond Independent School District is a public school district based in Bremond, Texas (USA). The district operates one high school, Bremond High School.

== Finances ==
As of the 2010–2011 school year, the appraised valuation of property in the district was $403,424,000. The maintenance tax rate was $0.104 and the bond tax rate was $0.025 per $100 of appraised valuation.

== Academic achievement ==
In 2011, the school district was rated "recognized" by the Texas Education Agency. Thirty-five percent of districts in Texas in 2011 received the same rating. No state accountability ratings will be given to districts in 2012. A school district in Texas can receive one of four possible rankings from the Texas Education Agency: Exemplary (the highest possible ranking), Recognized, Academically Acceptable, and Academically Unacceptable (the lowest possible ranking).

Bremond High School, the district's secondary campus, received an accountability rating of "A" from the Texas Education Agency.

Historical district TEA accountability ratings

- 2011: Recognized
- 2010: Recognized
- 2009: Recognized
- 2008: Academically Acceptable
- 2007: Academically Acceptable
- 2006: Academically Acceptable
- 2005: Recognized
- 2004: Recognized

== Schools ==
In the 2011–2012 school year, the district operated three schools.

- Bremond High School (Grades 9–12)
- Bremond Middle School (Grades 6–8)
- Bremond Elementary School (Grades PK–5)

== Athletics ==
Bremond High School participates in the boys' sports of baseball, basketball, football, and track, and the girls' sports of basketball, softball, volleyball, and track. For the 2016 through 2018 school years, Bremond High School played football in UIL Class 2A Division II. During the 2014 football season, the Bremond football team won the 2A Division II state championship with a record of 15–0, defeating Albany in the title game. In 2015 the Tigers beat Albany again, to finish the season undefeated 16–0. In 2016 the Tigers again finished 16-0 and won their third straight state title, this time over Iraan, compiling a 47–0 record over three seasons. Quarterback Roshauud Paul went on to play wide receiver for Texas A&M and Arkansas State.

In the 2024 football season, Bremond advanced to the UIL Class 2A Division II state semifinals, finishing with a 12–3 record.

== See also ==
- List of school districts in Texas
- List of high schools in Texas
