= Albert T. Patrick =

American lawyer and murderer

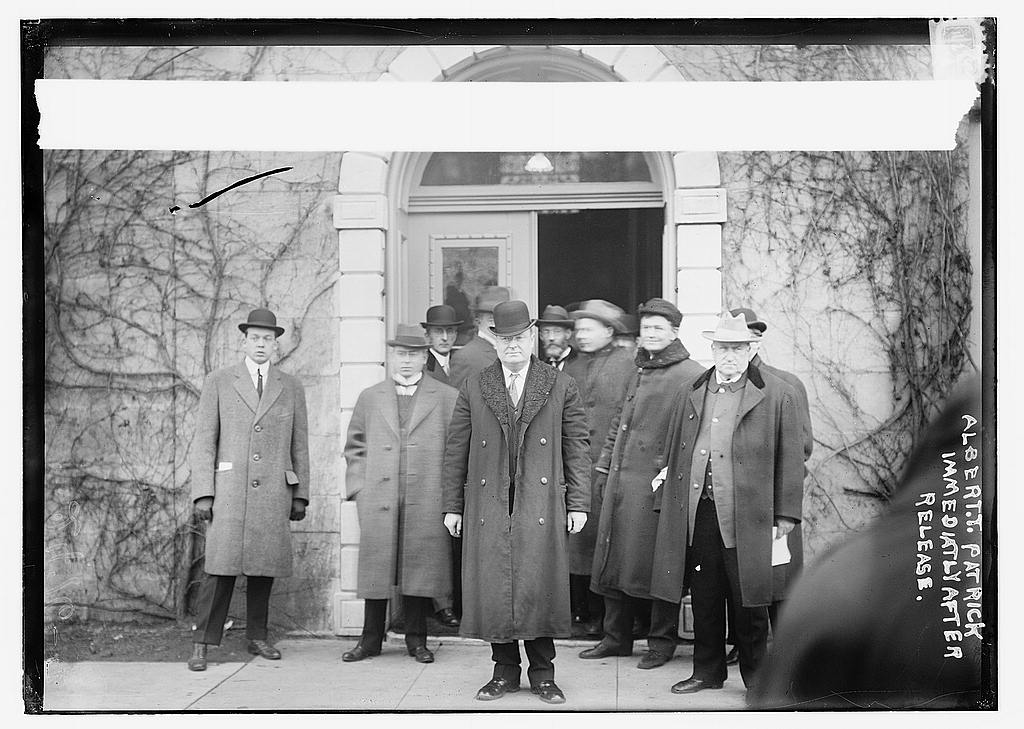
Albert T. Patrick immediately after his release in 1913

Albert T. Patrick (February 26, 1866 – February 11, 1940) was an American lawyer who was convicted and sentenced to death at Sing Sing for the murder of his client William Marsh Rice.

== Case ==
Patrick was born in Texas on February 26, 1866. He was charged with conspiring to murder Rice on 24 September 1900, convicted on 26 March 1902 and sentenced to be electrocuted. His appeals of the conviction – and his filing of a formal complaint against the practice of solitary confinement – delayed the execution of the sentence. In 1906, Governor of New York Frank W. Higgins commuted his sentence to life imprisonment. Doubts about the evidence caused the Governor John Alden Dix to pardon him in 1912. In 1930 he was disbarred and the disbarment was upheld by the New York State Supreme Court. It was said that the conduct of the case during the 12 years between being charged and being pardoned cost Patrick and his friends $162,000. Patrick died in Tulsa, Oklahoma on February 11, 1940.
