= William Marsh Rice =

American businessman and philanthropist (1816–1900)

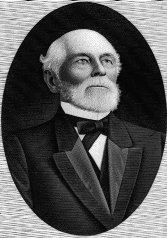
- Engraving of Rice
- Born: March 14, 1816; Springfield, Massachusetts, U.S.
- Died: September 23, 1900 (aged 84); New York City, U.S.
- Occupation: Businessman
- Known for: Namesake of Rice University

William Marsh Rice (March 14, 1816 – September 23, 1900) was an American businessman and entrepreneur who made his fortune in Texas. He is best known for leaving his fortune to fund the establishment of Rice University in Houston, Texas.

His death in 1900 captured national attention, drawing widespread media coverage of the complex events surrounding it. Rice was murdered by his valet, Charles F. Jones, as part of a conspiracy orchestrated by attorney Albert T. Patrick. The goal of the conspiracy was to forge Rice's will and claim his fortune. Patrick was sentenced to death for his role in the plot.

== Early life ==
William Marsh Rice was born on March 14, 1816, in Springfield, Massachusetts, the third of ten children of David and Patty (née Hall) Rice.

Rice left school at the age of fifteen to begin working as a general store clerk in Springfield. By the time he was twenty-one, Rice was operating his own store. Following the economic downturn caused by the Panic of 1837, Rice relocated to Houston, Texas, in search of new business opportunities in the new Republic of Texas.

Upon arriving in Houston, Rice’s first business venture was at the Milam Hotel, where he provided and served liquor at the hotel’s bar in exchange for three dollars a day plus room and board.

Rice’s plan to open a mercantile business in Houston was met with setbacks when his merchandise was lost at sea. He worked as a clerk to earn the necessary funds to continue his business ambitions. Rice received a license for his mercantile business in 1840 and took on Ebenezer Nichols as a business partner. They opened the Rice and Nichols general store in Houston, which was the foundation for what would later become William M. Rice and Company.

== Later life ==
Rice made his fortune by investing in land, real estate, lumber, railroads, cotton, and other prospects in Texas and Louisiana. In 1860, his total property, which included fifteen enslaved persons, was worth $750,000. According to the 1860 census, Rice was then the richest man in Houston. He invested in business firms in Houston; in 1895, he was listed in the city directories as "Capitalist. Owner of Capitol Hotel and Capitol Hotel Annex Building, President of Houston Brick Works Company." Rice was a member of the Independent Order of Odd Fellows.

Rice married Margaret Bremond, daughter of Paul Bremond (Houston and Texas Central Railway) and Harriet Martha Sprouls, in 1850 in Houston. The 1860 census places William and Margaret Rice in Houston's 2nd Ward. Clerks are also identified in the same census report; thus the location is most likely Rice's merchant business. Margaret was 16 years Rice's junior. She died, at age 31, in 1863 in Houston. Rice is also reported to have lived in Matamoros, Mexico, in 1863. Whether there is a connection to the timing of Margaret's death to his living in Matamoros is not clear. By 1865, he was reported as living back in Houston. While living in Houston, Rice served on the Harris County Slave Patrol.

Rice lived in Houston until around 1865, when he moved to New York (but did not own a home there). He built a house on a 160-acre (0.65 km^{2}) estate in Dunellen, New Jersey, and moved there in 1872. He became a resident of New York again in 1882.

Rice married Julia E. Brown (nee Elizabeth Baldwin) on June 26, 1867. Baldwin was the sister of Charlotte Rice, the wife of William Rice's brother Frederick.

In the early 1870s, his company built a railroad through the area of what is now the city of Rice, Texas (between Corsicana and Ennis, Texas). He donated land to the city for a church and a cemetery.

On January 28, 1882, William Rice drafted a will, instructing the executors to pay over to the trustees, the Governor and the Judge, funds from his estate for the establishment of "The William M. Rice Orphans Institute." The next year, he began spending more time in Houston, reuniting with old acquaintances. After an 1886 or 1887 meeting with a C. Lombardi, Rice decided that the benefits of his wealth should be enjoyed by the children of the city where he made his fortune. In 1891, Rice decided that he would not establish an Orphans Institute at the Dunellen estate, but would instead found the William M. Rice Institute for the Advancement of Literature, Science and Art in Houston, Texas. The Institute's charter was signed by all the original trustees, except for Rice, on May 18, 1891, and certified by the State of Texas the following day. Rice donated land to the now incorporated city of Rice located between Corsicana and Ennis, Texas.

Rice's marriage to Elizabeth was "stormy", and during the 1890s, she consulted an attorney regarding the possibility of a divorce. She died "hopelessly insane" in Waukesha, Wisconsin, on July 24, 1896.

Rice was an eccentric. In his later years, he ate no meat and rarely any vegetables. His diet consisted of bouillon and eggs.

== Death and scandal ==
In 1893, Rice made a new will, naming as executors Captain James A. Baker (a lawyer who often worked for him), William M. Rice Jr. (his nephew), and John D. Bartine. The value of Rice's estate at the time was estimated at about $4.6 million (equivalent to $165 million in 2025). The new will stipulated his estate was to be divided into two equal parts. One half was go to the creation of the Rice Institute, and the other half was to be divided such that 50% would go to wife Elizabeth Baldwin Rice, and the remaining 50% would be distributed to his four other beneficiaries.

Following the death of his wife in July 1896, a new will was executed on September 26, 1896, which allocated $80,000 to his brother Frederick and $100,000 each to his two sisters. The remainder of the estate was to be used to establish the Rice Institute. The ensuing legal battles over the estate of Elizabeth Rice set the stage for a crime that would become one of the earliest sensational crimes of the 20th century.

Before her death, she had secretly signed a will that stipulated the distribution of half of the couple's estate. She assumed that she would have half of the couple's estate under the laws of Texas. The next four years saw a great deal of litigation over the will of Elizabeth Rice. The executor of Elizabeth's will was O. T. Holt, assisted by Albert T. Patrick, formerly an attorney in Houston, but working in New York at the time. Under a false identity, Patrick interviewed Rice, who would not otherwise have seen him due to his professional relationship with Elizabeth Rice. Patrick was attempting to establish Rice's domicile in Texas, and not in New York, which would have provided a more favorable bequest for Mrs. Rice. Despite revealing his identity in 1900, to Rice's anger, the two men continued to have dealings.

Plotting to take control of Rice's estate and become the beneficiary of his fortune, Patrick prepared a fake will, forging Rice's signature on it. The fraudulent document named William Rice Jr. and James Baker Jr. as executors, but replaced John Bartine's name with Patrick's. He made bequests to a number of relatives and friends of Rice and of his own, hoping to involve as many interested parties as possible. In the words of James A. Baker Sr.:

... Mr. William M. Rice, Jr., the nephew of William Marsh Rice, and one of the attorneys of Mr. Rice (Captain Baker) were named as executors not only of the first, or genuine will of Mr. Rice, but in the second or so-called Patrick will; that each of them received greater benefits under the second will then [sic] under the first; and while he, Patrick, was named as residuary legatee under the second will, yet he was in fact a trustee, to take over the property of the estate and administer it in carrying out a number of secret trusts verbally declared by Mr. Rice.

William Rice was living alone in his apartment at 500 Madison Avenue, New York. His butler and valet, Charles F. Jones, had worked for him for a number of years.

On September 24, 1900, James Baker received a telegram from Jones, stating:

Mr. Rice died last night under the care of a physician. Certificate of death old age, extreme nervousness. Funeral tomorrow morning at nine o'clock. Interment at Waukesha beside his wife. Wire when you are coming.

Despite the contents of this telegram, a second communique, from Rice's bankers, warned that the multi-millionaire had died under peculiar circumstances, and that his body was to be cremated.

On September 23, 1900, Rice was found dead by Charles Jones. Rice was presumed to have died in his sleep. Shortly thereafter, a bank teller noticed a suspiciously large check bearing the late Rice's signature and made out to Rice's New York City lawyer, Albert T. Patrick, but with Albert's name misspelled "Abert". Soon, Patrick made an announcement that Rice had changed his will right before his death, leaving the bulk of his fortune to Patrick rather than to his Institute. A subsequent investigation led by the District Attorney of New York resulted in the arrests of Patrick and of Jones, who had been persuaded to administer chloroform to Rice while he slept.

Court testimony would later show that Jones and Patrick had conspired to murder Rice on September 23. The will was proved a forgery. Patrick was sentenced to death, spending four years on death row at Sing Sing Prison before having his sentence commuted by Governor Frank Higgins in 1906. He received a full pardon from Governor John A. Dix six years later. Patrick died in Tulsa, Oklahoma on February 11, 1940, aged 74.

Charles Jones was given freedom in exchange for his confession and testimony against Patrick. After the trial, he remained in seclusion until November 16, 1954. On that date, at age 79, he died by suicide in Baytown, Texas, where he lived.

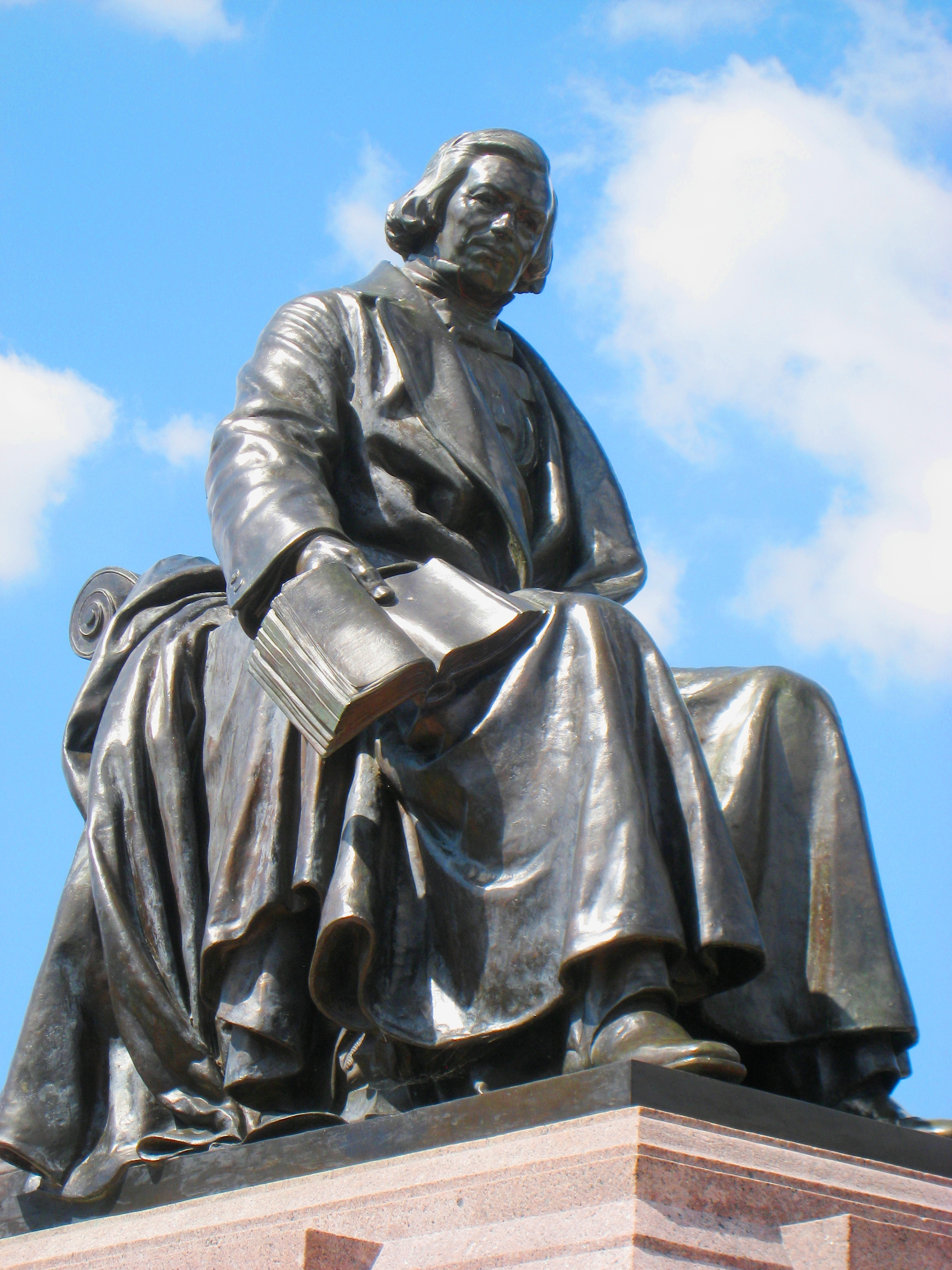
Statue of William Marsh Rice at Rice University, sculpted by John Angel.

Rice's body was eventually cremated, and the urn of his ashes was kept in the vault of the business office of the Trustees of the Institute until it was deposited beneath the monument erected in his memory on the campus of the Institute. In 1930, John Angel completed the Founder's Memorial at Rice University — depicting a seated William Marsh Rice — in line with specifications by architect Ralph Adams Cram.

== Legacy ==
Rice left the bulk of his estate to the founding of a free institute of higher education in Houston, Texas. Opening in 1912 as William Marsh Rice Institute for the Advancement of Letters, Science, and Art, it is known today as Rice University. In his will, Rice mandated that the university to bear his name would be for "the white men and women of Houston." This request was eventually overruled, and Raymond L. Johnson — Rice University's first black student — was admitted in 1964.

The Rice School in Houston is also named after William Marsh Rice.

A film, The Trust, depicts the story of William Marsh Rice's murder and the role of his attorney, James A. Baker Sr., in uncovering the truth.
