= Percina shumardi =

River darter

Conservation status
- Least Concern (IUCN 3.1)

- Secure (NatureServe)

Scientific classification
- Kingdom: Animalia
- Phylum: Chordata
- Class: Actinopterygii
- Order: Perciformes
- Family: Percidae
- Genus: Percina
- Species: P. shumardi

Binomial name
- Percina shumardi (Girard, 1859)

Synonyms
- Hadropterus shumardi Girard, 1859

Species of fish

Percina shumardi (river darter) is a benthic species of freshwater ray-finned fish, a darter from the subfamily Etheostomatinae, part of the family Percidae, which also contains the perches, ruffes and pikeperches. It is native to North America. It is an inhabitant of small and medium rivers where it occurs in rocky riffles with clear, fast-flowing water. The river darter can reach up to 7.3 cm (2.9 in) in length and has an average lifespan of three years. It can be distinguished from other darters by its unique front and rear spots on the dorsal fin.

== Geographic distribution ==
The river darter is a species native only to the United States and Canada. Within Canada, the river darter is native to southern regions including the Hudson Bay basin, Ontario, and Manitoba. Within the United States, the river darter is native to a band that starts northward in Canada and extends into Minnesota and North Dakota and continues to the Gulf drainages in Alabama and Texas. The river darter is the most common species of darter in the Mississippi River Channel.

== Description ==
Darters are characterized by two dorsal fins and dorsal scutes, a line of modified scales along the midline of the body. They have two anal spins and a complete lateral line. Darters have a moderately pointed snout and a subterminal mouth. River darters are olive brown with distinct dorsal blotching and a mottled back. The dorsal blotches form 8–15 faint bars along the body that become more discernibly ovular towards the tail. A distinctive bar can be seen below the eye. The dorsal fins are clear with light banding. Nuptial males have a bright, golden band in the posterior region of the first, spiny dorsal fin. The second dorsal fin has up to 16 soft rays. The anal fin has 11 rays. Males are darker and more distinctly marked during spawning season, but do not develop bright colors like many other darters. Tubercles develop on the caudal, pelvic and anal fins, and occasionally also occur on the heads of males during the breeding season.

== Habitat ==
As its name implies, the river darter can be found in major rivers and at the mouths of adjoining tributaries. River darters prefer to inhabit regions with moderate to swift currents in regions around 1 metre (3 ft 3 in) deep. They inhabit chutes of oxbow rivers and riffles containing sandy, gravely, and rocky substrates. During the evening river darters migrate inshore and are commonly found along sandbars in shallower depths of around .6–.9 metres (2 ft 0 in – 2 ft 11 in). During the day they move away from the shore and are most abundant in 1.2 metres (3 ft 11 in) or more of water.

=== Response to turbidity ===
The river darter relies on frictional contact with the substratum to maintain its position while minimizing its energy usage. The river darter's enlarged pectoral fins help create negative lift and increase the friction between its body and the ground to counteract turbidity. As current speed increases, the river darter, like many lotic fishes, increases its frictional contact with the river bottom by releasing gasses from its swim bladder, which increases its density and keeps it near the river bottom.

=== Management ===
The abundance of the River darter in the Mississippi River and tributaries indicates that it is not extremely sensitive to turbidity and water pollution. However, the river darter does require deep swift water habitats, which are quickly disappearing with flood control and river impoundment programs. Darters are at risk to pollution due to their small sizes and benthic breeding and feeding habitats that can be heavily modified by pollution. Somewhere between one half and one third of all darter species are considered to be at risk of extinction. In order to protect the river darter, rivers need to be restored and maintained in their natural state with intact flow patterns. River darter abundance is best surveyed in the summer, when water levels are typically at their lowest.

== Diet ==
The river darter is an invertivore that primarily feeds during the day. Adult individuals feed on a wide variety of all aquatic invertebrates such as midge and caddisfly larvae, which are common in streams and rivers. Snails are another fundamental aspect of the diet of mature river darters. Chironomids, trichopteras, and small crustaceans are other key elements of the adult diet of river darters. Juvenile river darters typically feed on much smaller prey. Primarily food sources for juveniles include small zooplankton floating in their freshwater habitats.

== Lifecycle ==
The river darter attains much of its adult size during the first year of development, and reaches sexual maturity by the age of one. Males tend to develop faster and become larger than females. The average lifespan of a river darter is between 3–4 years.

=== Reproduction ===
The river darter spawns from February to May. River darters are brood hiders; they do not guard their eggs. After they have laid their eggs they do not provide parental care. Females bury their fertilized eggs in gravel depressions in areas of slow current. These gravel depressions are called redds. River darter eggs are able to tolerate temperatures between 13–26 °C (55–79 °F). Some reports indicate upstream migration of river darters during the spring. After spawning the fish may move downstream to reach overwintering habitats. The newly hatched larvae may drift downstream as well, and as they grow the darters shift into faster water habitats of mature darters.

== Etymology ==
The river darter's scientific name comes from the Greek root word Percina or 'little perch' and the word shumardi which was given in honor of its discoverer, Dr. George Getz Shumard (1823–1867), a surgeon with the United States Pacific Railroad Survey.
