= Nathan Fuller =

American businessman and politician

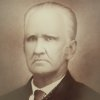
Nathan Fuller

Nathan Fuller was a mayor of Houston and a businessman.

== Personal life ==
Nathan Fuller was a resident of Beaufort, North Carolina, where he was married to Charlotte M. Fuller. The family moved to Sumter County, Alabama around 1839. They moved to Houston around 1843.

== Career ==
Fuller served two consecutive one-year terms as Mayor of Houston in 1853 and 1854. His principal initiative was the promotion of Houston as a terminal for a railroad. He promoted the Houston and Texas Central Railway to compete with the Buffalo Bayou, Brazos, and Colorado Railway, which located its eastern terminus in the rival town of Harrisburg, Texas. Meanwhile, Fuller also promoted the port of Houston by lobbying for a state grant for dredging and clearing obstacles from Buffalo Bayou.

Political offices
Preceded by Francis W. Moore, Jr.	Mayor of Houston, Texas; 1853–1854	Succeeded by James H. Stevens
