= Charles Bigelow =

Charles Bigelow may refer to:

- Charles Bigelow (type designer) (born 1945), American type historian, professor, and designer
- Charles Bigelow (politician) (1805–1885), mayor of Houston in 1840–1841
- Charles Bigelow (racing driver) (1872–1958), American auto racing driver
- Charles H. Bigelow (1814–1862), American architect
- Charles A. Bigelow (1862–1912), American actor
