= Charles Bigelow (politician) =

Mayor of Houston

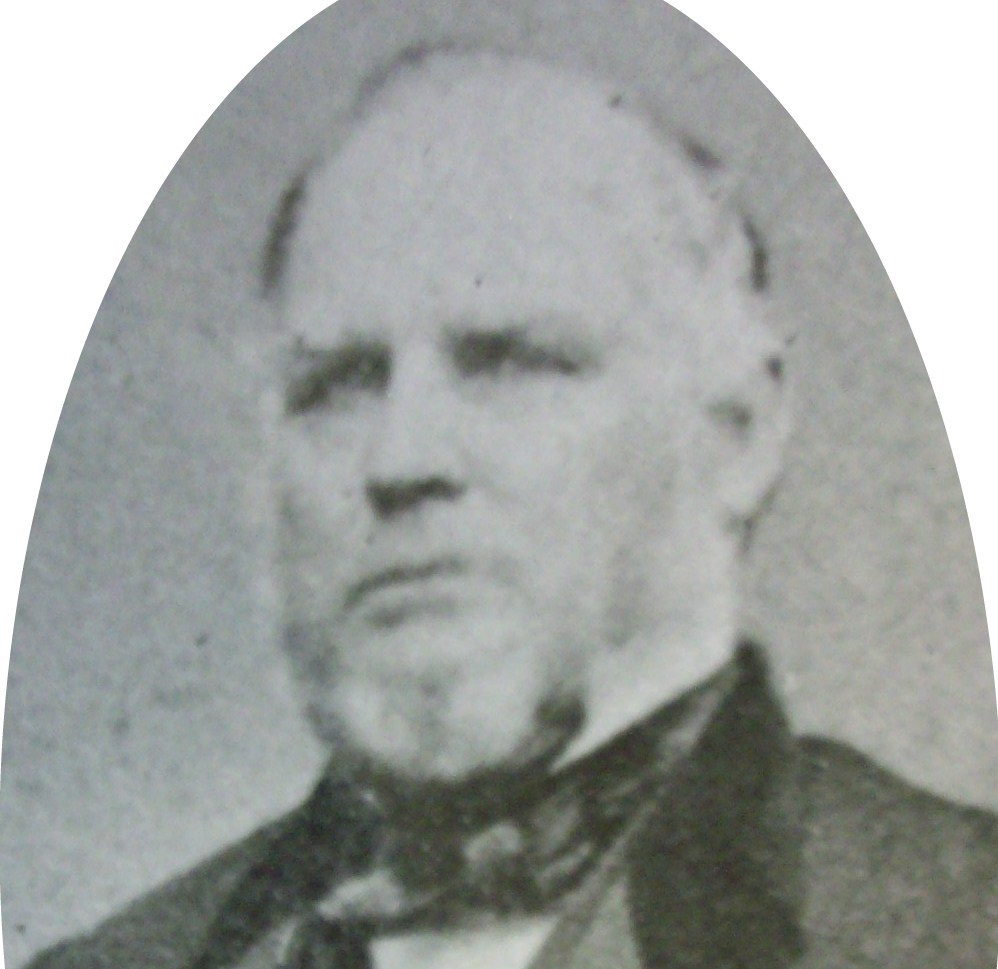

4th Mayor of Houston
- In office January 6, 1840 – January 15, 1841
- Preceded by: George W. Lively
- Succeeded by: John Day Andrews

Personal details
- Born: July 15, 1805 Northborough, Massachusetts, U.S.
- Died: October 27, 1885 (aged 80) Grafton, Massachusetts, U.S.
- Spouse(s): Cynthia Greenwood Warren (m. 1829; died 1849) Harriet Caroline Taft (m. 1849)

Charles Grafton Bigelow (July 15, 1805 – October 27, 1885) was a businessman who served a single one-year term as the fourth mayor of Houston, Texas, from January 6, 1840, to January 15, 1841, before serving as a colonel in the Mexican-American War.

Bigelow Street in Houston's Near Northside neighborhood is named in his honor.

== Early life ==
Born on July 15, 1805, in Northborough, Massachusetts, Bigelow left his hometown at age 23 to found the Northwest Territory's first tannery in Detroit. On May 28, 1829, he married his first wife, Cynthia Greenwood Warren, in Northborough. They had two daughters, Sarah Warren and Agnes Louisa Bigelow, in 1831 and 1835 respectively.

== Career ==
After moving back to his home state in 1831, Bigelow conducted business in the towns of Grafton, Northbridge, Uxbridge, and Worcester before emigrating to the Republic of Texas. Bigelow had arrived in Texas by November 28, 1838, when he advertised 170 acres of land for sale in the Telegraph and Texas Register. Bigelow owned a farm equipment store and an ice house in Houston.

On January 6, 1840, Bigelow defeated incumbent George W. Lively by one vote in Houston's mayoral election. During a term characterized by tension between Houston, Harris County, and rival settlements such as Harrisburg, Bigelow sought to improve relations by hosting visiting dignitaries such as James Pinckney Henderson. Before his term ended on January 15, 1841, Bigelow and Houston's aldermen faced many of the new city's challenges while taking measures to establish it as a leading city in, if no longer the capital of Texas.

Featuring a locomotive and plow representing local industry, Houston's seal was adopted during Mayor Bigelow's term and has been in continued use since.

After Bigelow's authorization by the city council on February 17 to commission a seal for the young city, the Seal of Houston was drafted by Bigelow's friend and former mayor Francis W. Moore, Jr. It was formally received as the city's seal during the next meeting, on February 24.

Accompanied by railroad officials and community leaders on July 25, 1840, Bigelow formally began construction of the short-lived Houston and Brazos Rail Road with a spade during a groundbreaking ceremony.

Maddened by a $500 annual license issued to the county's brothels, Bigelow petitioned Harris County in a lawsuit by the city to end licensing, a revenue stream supplied disproportionately by Houstonians, in favor of a property tax. Despite a legally dubious case, Judge A.B. Shelby granted an injunction temporarily halting the collection of license taxes within Houston.

== Later years ==
After his term ended on January 15, 1841, Bigelow remained in the city as a businessman. In 1846, served as a colonel of a Texas Regiment of Rangers in the Mexican-American War, allegedly playing a significant role in the Battle of Palo Alto. In September 1849, his first wife died when the Brig Cuba was lost at sea in a gale while sailing from Galveston to New York. Saddened by her death, he returned to Massachusetts, where he married Harriet Caroline Taft on December 6, 1849. Unionist and abolitionist sentiments were factors leading Bigelow to remain in Massachusetts, where he would raise three children with his second wife, Charles, Harriet C. "Hattie", and Charles Sam Houston "Texas Charley" Bigelow.

== Death ==
Bigelow died at age 80 on October 27, 1885, in Grafton, Massachusetts. He is buried in Worcester, Massachusetts.

Preceded by George W. Lively	Mayor of Houston, Texas; 1840	Succeeded by John Day Andrews
