= Shumard Peak =

Mountain in Texas, United States

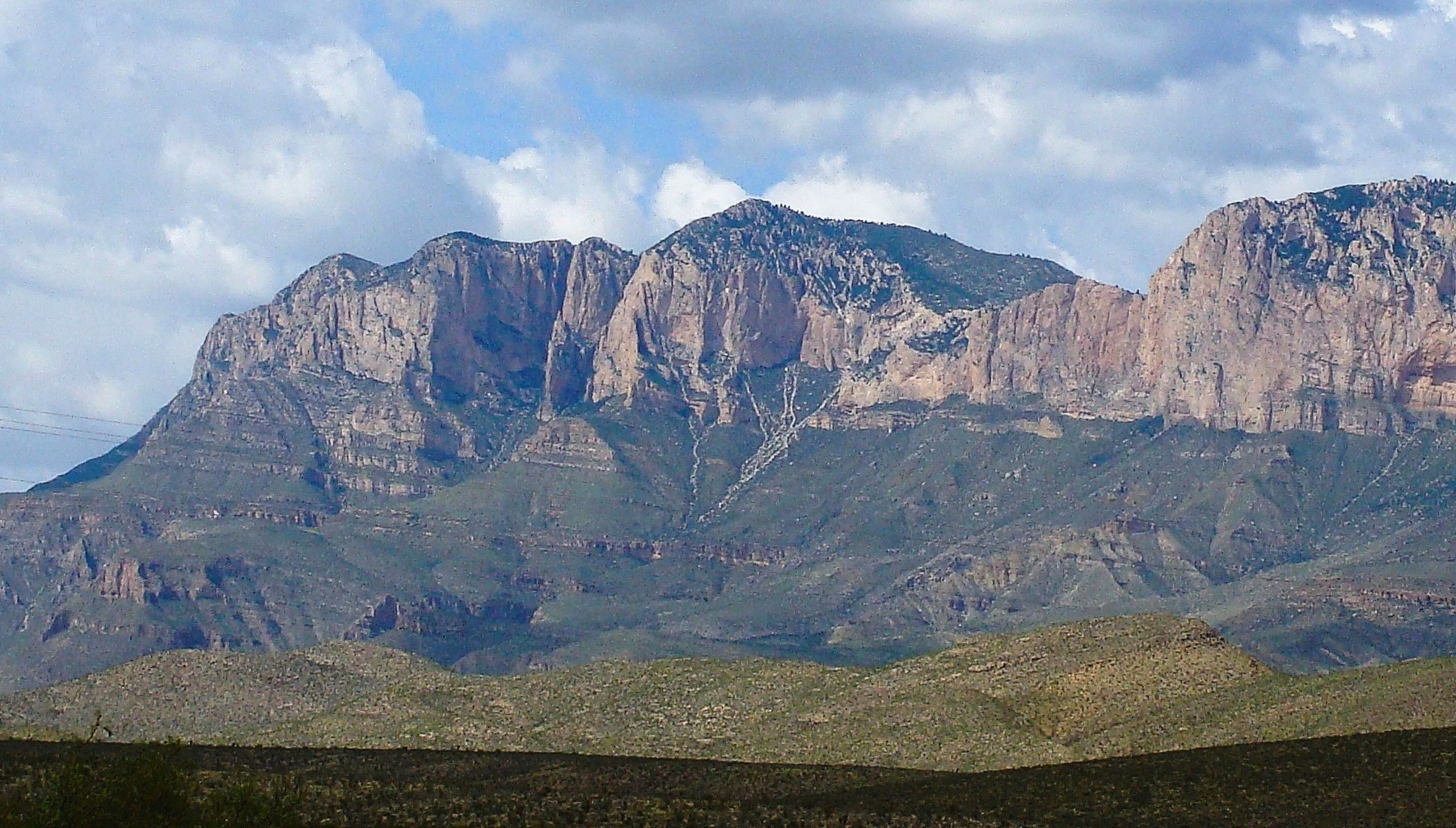
- South aspect

Highest point
- Elevation: 8,636 ft (2,632 m)
- Prominence: 900 ft (274 m)
- Parent peak: Guadalupe Peak (8,751 ft)
- Isolation: 1.32 mi (2.12 km)
- Coordinates: 31°54′27″N 104°52′28″W

Naming
- Etymology: George Getz Shumard

Geography
- Location within Texas Location within the United States
- Country: United States
- State: Texas
- County: Culberson
- Protected area: Guadalupe Mountains National Park
- Parent range: Guadalupe Mountains
- Topo map: USGS Guadalupe Peak

Geology
- Rock age: Lopingian
- Rock type: Limestone

Climbing
- Easiest route: class 2 hiking

Shumard Peak is an 8,636-foot-elevation (2,632-meter) summit in Culberson County, Texas, United States.

== Description ==
Shumard Peak is located in Guadalupe Mountains National Park and with more recent accurate Lidar measurements, it ranks as the second-highest peak in the Guadalupe Mountains and in the state of Texas, moving up from previous third in outdated sources. The mountain is composed of late Permian limestone and Capitan Formation like the other peaks in the Guadalupe Mountains. Topographic relief is significant as the summit rises over 4,600 feet (1,402 m) above Salt Basin in three miles (4.8 km). Precipitation runoff from the mountain's slopes drains west to Salt Basin, and east to the Delaware River which is part of the Pecos River watershed. The mountain's toponym was officially adopted on November 4, 1938, by the United States Board on Geographic Names to commemorate George Getz Shumard (1823–1867), who made the first geologic exploration of the Guadalupe Mountains in the 1850s. During an 1852 exploration, Shumard discovered the presence of Permian fossils in the area of the Guadalupe Mountains.

== Climate ==
Based on the Köppen climate classification, Shumard Peak is located in a cold semi-arid climate zone with relatively hot summers, calm, mild autumn weather, and cool to cold weather in winter and early spring. Nights are cool, even in summer. Late summer monsoons bring thunderstorms.

== See also ==
- List of mountain peaks of Texas
- Geography of Texas

== Gallery ==
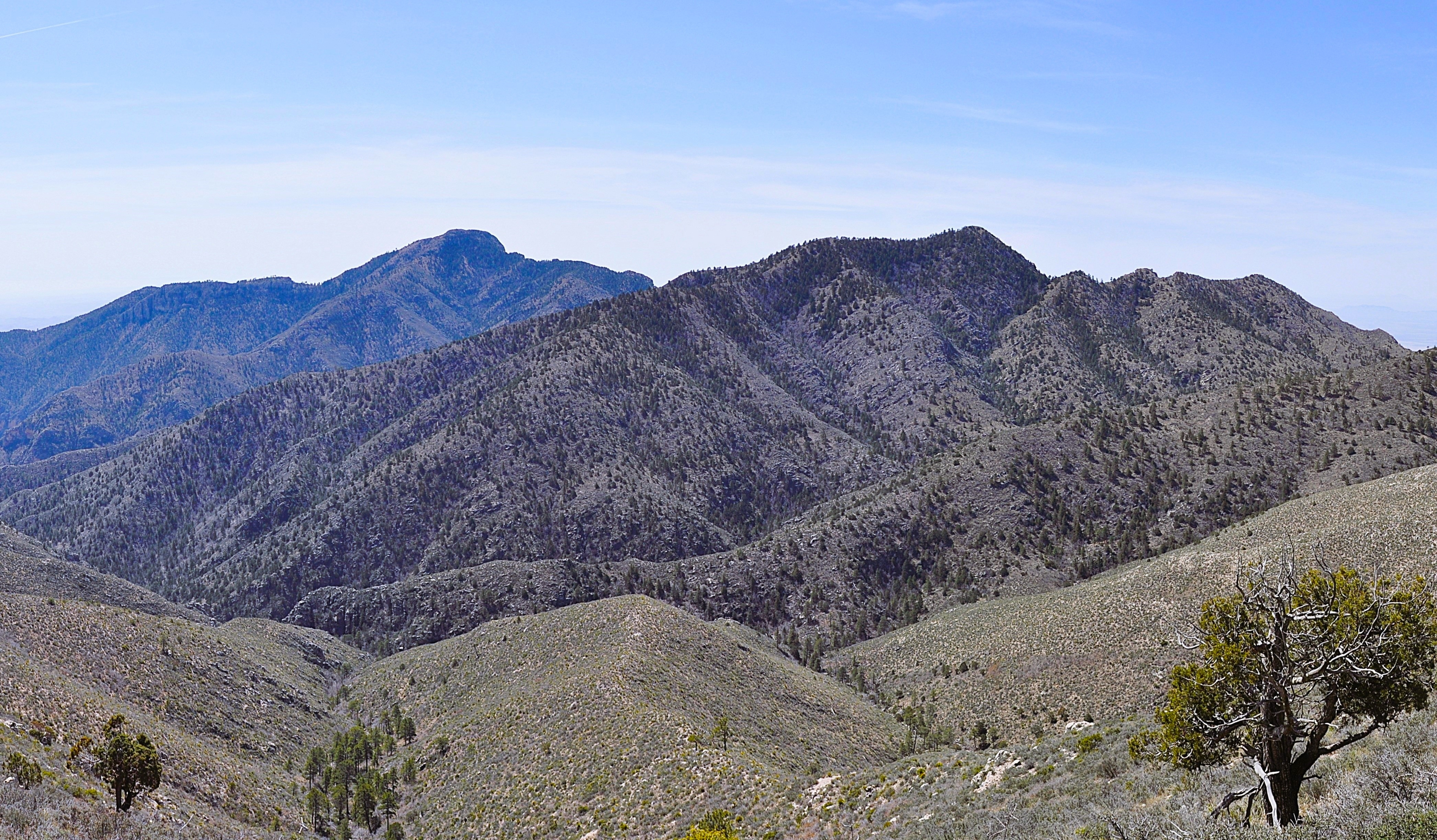
North aspect of Shumard Peak right of center.
(Guadalupe Peak behind, left).

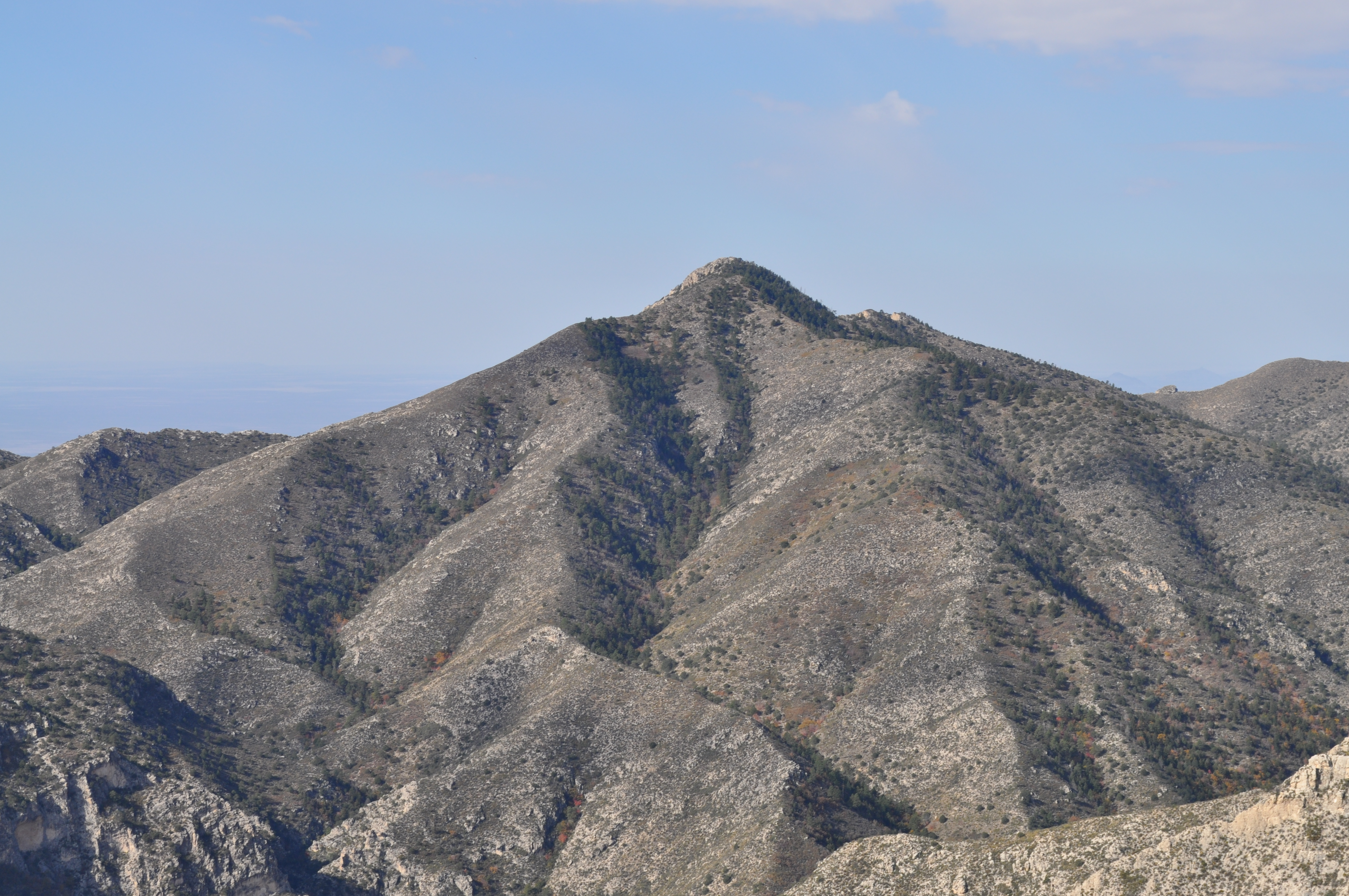
From the east

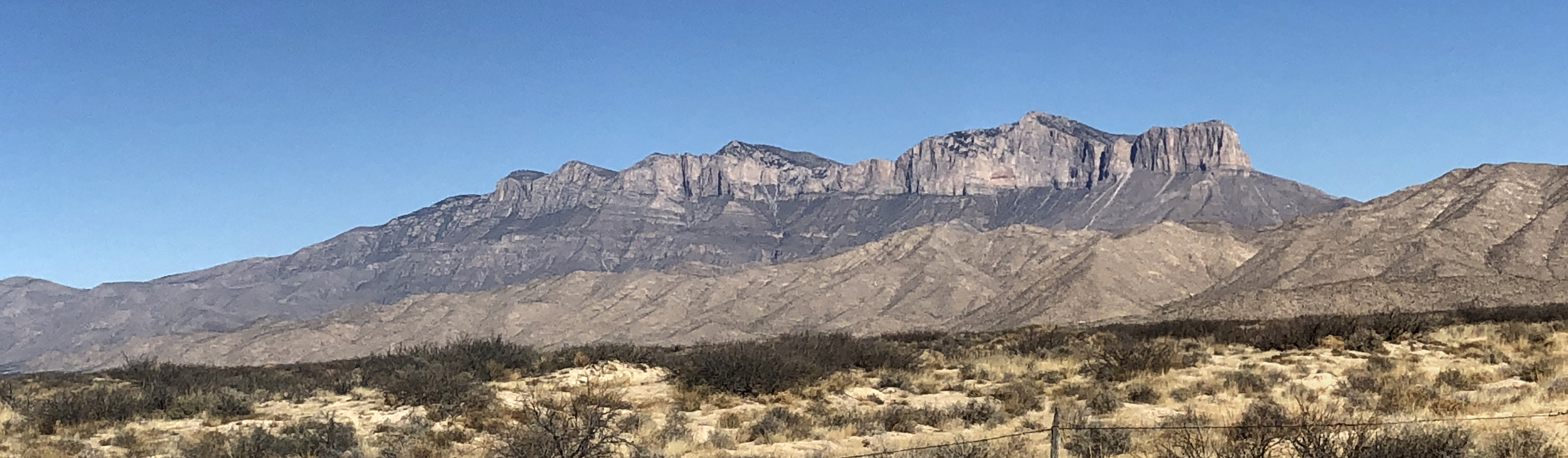
Shumard Peak centered, Guadalupe Peak to right. From West.

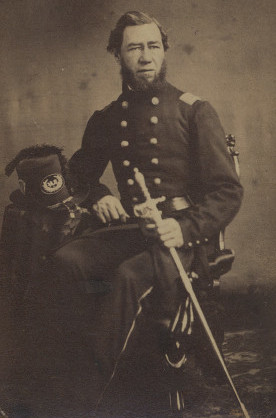
George Shumard in 1860s
