= James H. Stevens =

American businessman and politician

James H. Stevens (1818-July 21, 1856) was a merchant and a mayor of Houston, Texas.

== Personal life ==
Stevens was born in Kentucky in 1818.

== Career ==
Stevens moved to Texas in the early 1840s, where he began working as a clerk in a store. In 1847, he was elected as one of the Alderman for the Second Ward in Houston, a position he retailed through 1850. Meanwhile, he opened his own mercantile store and amassed enough wealth to invest in emerging transportation companies. Most notably, he was a founding subscriber to the Buffalo Bayou, Brazos & Colorado Railway, the first railroad to operate in Texas. In 1853, he divested of his mercantile business in order to focus on the railroad business.

Stevens served as the mayor of Houston for two consecutive one-year terms in 1855 and 1856. As mayor, he continued his interest in promoting railroads. During his tenure, he obtained a charter from the State of Texas on behalf of the City of Houston to run a railroad to tap into the Buffalo Bayou, Brazos & Colorado Railway at Pierce Junction. The city invested $130,000 to lay seven miles of track for the Houston Tap Railroad, which allowed the city to capture part of the lucrative cotton trade with the Brazos Valley.

== Death and legacy ==
Stevens died in office on July 21, 1856, after long suffering from tuberculosis.

In his will, Stevens pledged $5,000 toward the establishment of a school in Houston, provided that other citizens would donate another $10,000. Houstonians doubled that amount, and with a total of $25,000 in capitol, the Houston Academy was founded in 1858. The Houston Tap Railroad named its only locomotive, the James H. Stevens, in his honor.

Harold Platt included Stevens on his list of Houston antebellum "commercial-civic elites."

Political offices
Preceded by Nathan Fuller	Mayor of Houston, Texas; 1853–1854	Succeeded by Cornelius Ennis
