= James Sanders Holman =

Mayor of Houston

1st Mayor of Houston
- In office August 28, 1837 – November 1837
- Preceded by: office established
- Succeeded by: Francis W. Moore Jr.

Personal details
- Born: February 7, 1804 Murfreesboro, Tennessee, U.S.
- Died: December 8, 1867 (aged 63) Bryan, Texas, U.S.
- Party: Democratic
- Spouse: Martha Wilson Holman
- Children: 8+

Military service
- Allegiance: Republic of Texas
- Branch/service: Texian Army
- Battles/wars: Texas Revolution; Siege of Bexar

James Sanders Holman (February 7, 1804 – December 8, 1867) was a soldier, entrepreneur, and the first mayor of Houston.

== Early life ==
Holman was born in Murfreesboro, Tennessee to Isaac and Polly Anne (Wiggleworth) Holman on February 7, 1804. When he was about 13 years old, his family moved to Lincoln County, Tennessee. He married a first cousin Martha Wilson Holaman just after he turned 18 years old. He had at least 8 children.

== Career ==
Holman first arrived in Texas in 1834. His brother followed him to San Augustine, Texas, with several family members joining them the next year. Holman participated in the Texan Revolution, and fought in the Siege of Bexar. In 1836, the Allen brothers—Augustus Chapman and John Kirby— hired Holman as a real estate agent for the paper town of Houston. His signature appears on the city's earliest known map, and also on many early deeds, as he both advertised and sold Houston lots.

Late in 1836, Holman organized the Texas Railroad, Navigation, and Banking Company with Augustus Chapman Allen and several others. The First Congress of the Republic of Texas granted the corporation a charter to construct canals and railroads, and to establish a bank after accumulating stock subscriptions of $1 million. The company, however, did not survive sustained political attacks by Anson Jones and the Panic of 1837.

Holman served as clerk for Harris County, Texas, and while serving in this position, he assisted in bringing an incorporation bill for Houston in the Texas Congress.

On June 5, 1837, the Republic of Texas granted a municipal charter to Houston. In a three-way contest for mayor, Holman beat Francis Lubbock and Thomas J. Ward, 12–11–10. After he was elected in August 1837, he served for just three months. After a failed campaign to gain a seat in congress in 1838, he was elected as district clerk of Harris County and served from February 1839 to April 1841.

During the American Civil War, he served on the Texas State Military Board from 1864 to 1865, a body established to help the Confederacy trade with foreign powers in spite of a blockade from the Union. After the war, he supervised construction of the Houston and Texas Central Railway.

== Death and legacy ==
Holman succumbed to yellow fever in Bryan, Texas on December 8, 1867. The city of Houston named Holman Avenue after him.

Preceded by None	Mayor of Houston, Texas; 1837	Succeeded by Francis W. Moore, Jr.
