= Benjamin Franklin Shumard =

American geologist and physician (1820–1869)

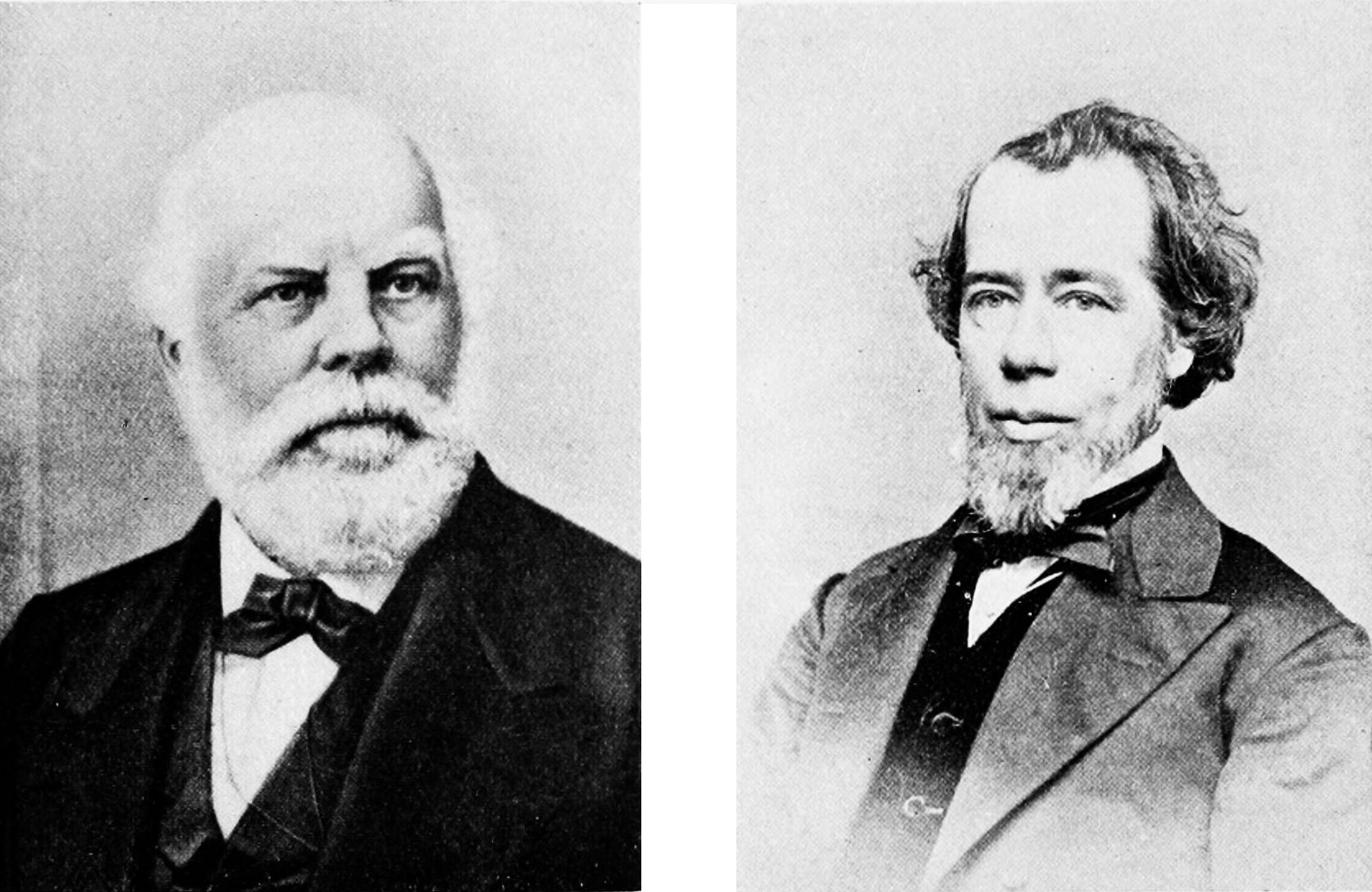
- Born: November 24, 1820; Lancaster, Pennsylvania, US
- Died: April 14, 1869 (aged 48); St. Louis, Missouri, US
- Occupations: Geologist, physician
- Known for: Shumard oak
- Spouse: Elizabeth Maria Allen
- Children: Two daughters

Benjamin Franklin Shumard (November 24, 1820 – April 14, 1869) was an American medical doctor and geologist. He served as a medical doctor in Kentucky, then worked for about 15 years as a geologist. He conducted geological surveys in several states (Iowa, Minnesota, Missouri, Oregon, Wisconsin) before being appointed in 1858 as the State Geologist of Texas. He organized the first major Texas Geological Survey. In 1860, an assistant state geologist named the Shumard oak species in his honor. On the heels of a political struggle over his appointment, Shumard moved back to Missouri during the Civil War and resumed his medical career there.

== Life and career ==
Shumard was born in Lancaster, Pennsylvania, and his parents, John and Ann Catherine (née Getz), moved to Cincinnati when he was young. His maternal grandfather was an inventor, which may have led to his interest in science. He studied at Miami University and medical school in Kentucky. His younger brother, George Getz Shumard, who was considered a better geologist, assisted Benjamin with the Texas surveys, and later became Surgeon General of Ohio. Benjamin married Elizabeth Maria Allen in 1852 and they had two daughters. The Shumard oak was identified in an 1860 publication by Samuel Botsford Buckley, an assistant to Shumard in Texas who named the species in honor of Shumard. Buckley later became chief geologist himself.

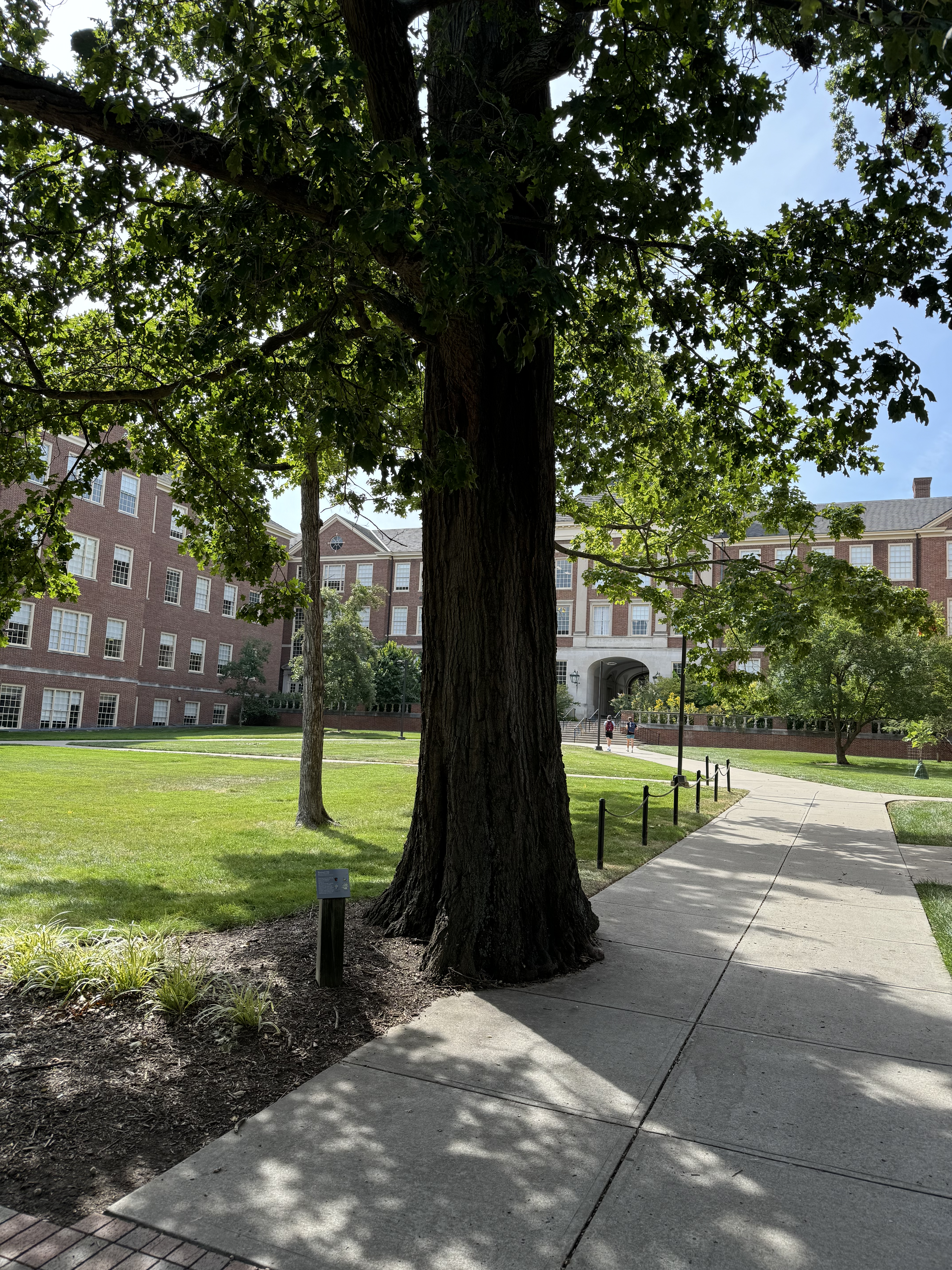
Shumard oak on the "tree walk" at Miami University, where Shumard studied

On August 25, 1858, Shumard was appointed as the state geologist for Texas. He was charged mainly with surveying the state's mineral resources and the suitability of its soils for agriculture. After visiting Philadelphia and New York, he purchased instruments and chemicals, packed up his St. Louis specimens and library, and arrived in Austin at the end of October. For staff, he hired his brother George Getz Shumard, an experienced geologist, chemist W.P. Riddell, and A. R. Roessler as drafter; two others were assigned for meteorological observations.

The survey team's field operations ended in November 1859. On December 1, Shumard submitted his "First Report of Progress of the Geological and Agricultural Survey of Texas." The report covered eastern and central Texas, with details on 11 counties. He also reported "an extensive coal formation" in northern Texas, in an area over 4,000 square miles, which he predicted "will exercise a most important influence on [the state's] welfare and prosperity." Most of the coal was lignite. Besides coal, the survey reported on "vast accumulations of iron ore", limestone, lead, copper, gypsum, silver, and shale. In a tangential comment, decades before the Texas oil boom, Shumard noted "the occurrence of Petroleum, which has been observed at several locations in the State".

In August 1860, Shumard submitted to the Texas legislature another progress report on the survey. By that stage, he reported surveying 15 counties and 4 partially. Besides the extensive report on mineral wealth, this report concludes by arguing for the benefit of subsoiling technique for crops "during the present unprecedented dry season". Later that year, Sam Houston became governor and replaced Shumard with Francis W. Moore, a former Houston mayor and an amateur geologist. Though the Texas legislature backed Shumard, Houston did not reinstate him, partly due to allegations by his then-assistant Buckley, as Buckley noted in a 1874 report. Buckley accused Shumard of mismanagement and claimed that Shumard "was a poor mineralogist, and had little knowledge of the other departments of natural history". Shumard, in turn, later wrote that Buckley was "utterly incompetent", had taken his "precious little" knowledge of geology from him, "and that anything he may write would not command the respect of any man". Buckley was himself eventually named state geologist.

Shumard moved back to Missouri after Texas joined the Confederate side of the Civil War. He became a professor of obstetrics at the University of Missouri, where his field notebooks are archived. He was a founder of the Academy of Natural Science of St. Louis, first as secretary and later as president. Shumard was involved in several controversies in geology, including the taxonomy of Cretaceous rocks. In 1858, he announced the discovery of a marine Permian layer in the Guadalupe mountains, but his claim was disputed for more than 40 years. Some of his geology findings themselves became the subject of further research.
