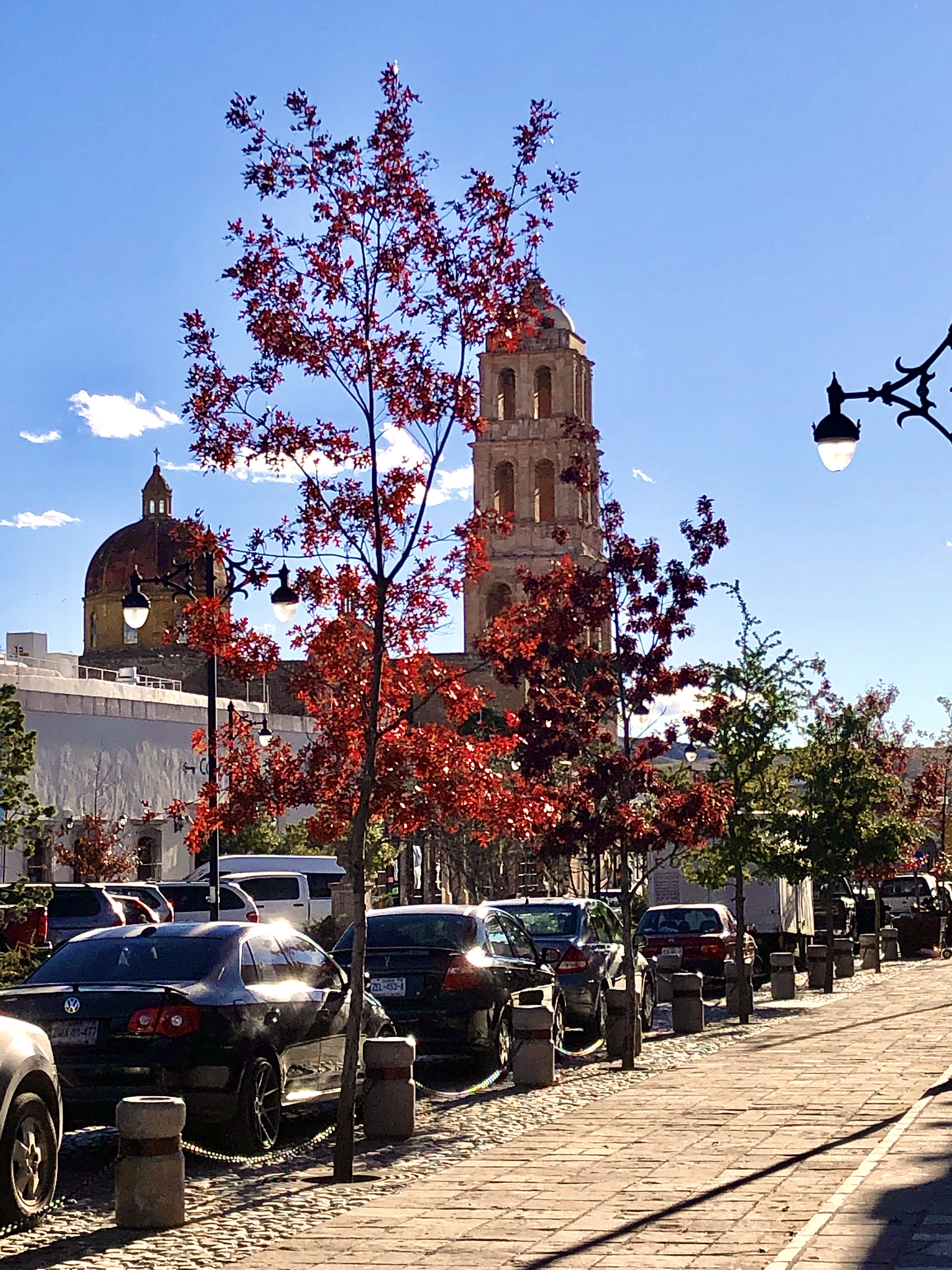
- Fall color of a planted tree in Sombrerete, Zacatecas, Mexico

Conservation status
- Least Concern (IUCN 3.1)

Scientific classification
- Kingdom: Plantae
- Clade: Embryophytes
- Clade: Tracheophytes
- Clade: Spermatophytes
- Clade: Angiosperms
- Clade: Eudicots
- Clade: Rosids
- Order: Fagales
- Family: Fagaceae
- Genus: Quercus
- Subgenus: Quercus subg. Quercus
- Section: Quercus sect. Lobatae
- Species: Q. shumardii

Binomial name
- Quercus shumardii Buckland
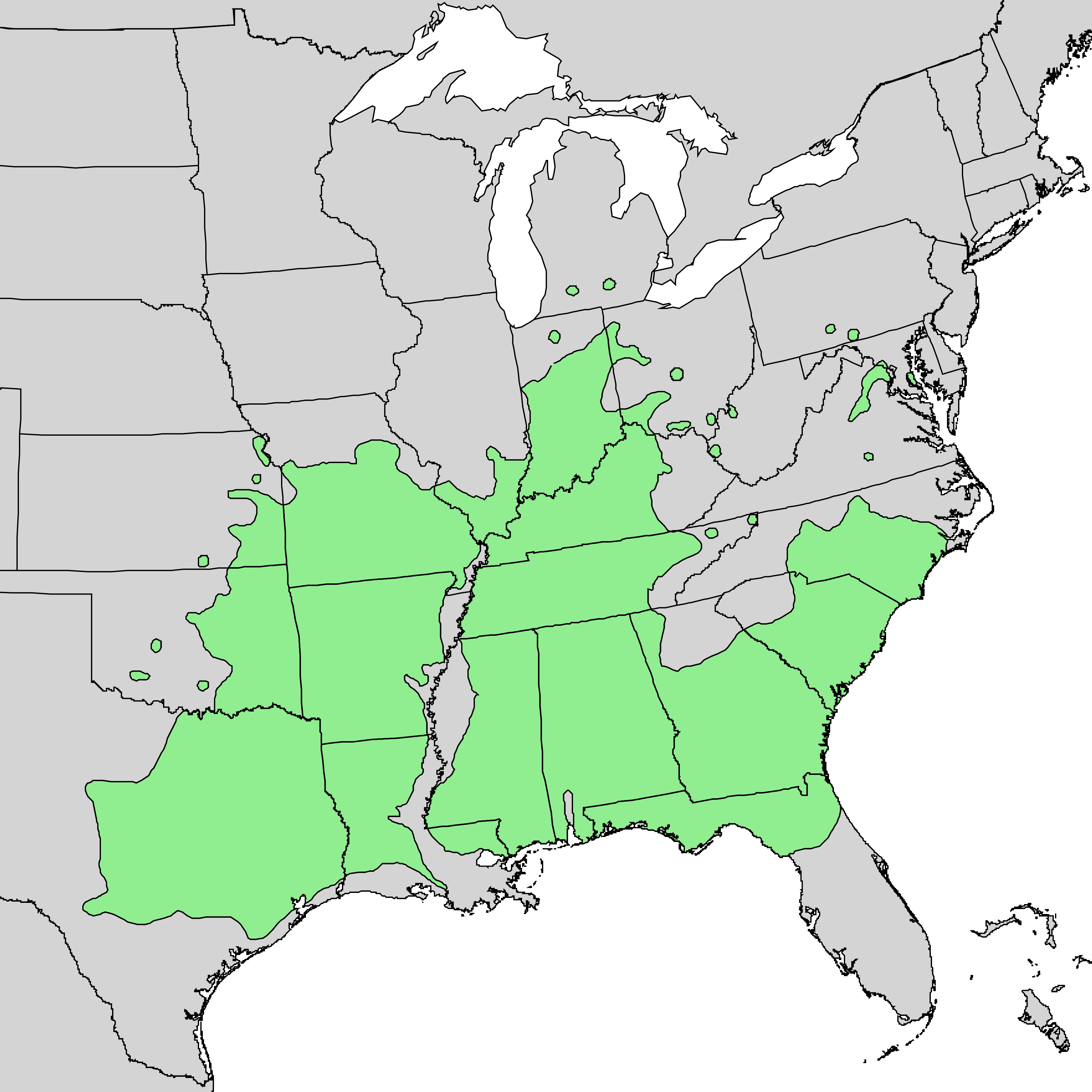
- Generalized natural range

Synonyms
- Quercus schneckii Britton

= Quercus shumardii =

Shumard oak

Species of oak tree

Quercus shumardii, the Shumard oak, spotted oak, Schneck oak, Shumard red oak, or swamp red oak, is one of the largest of the oak species in the red oak group (Quercus section Lobatae). It is closely related to Quercus buckleyi (Texas red oak), Quercus texana (Nuttall's red oak), and Quercus gravesii (Chisos red oak).

== Description ==
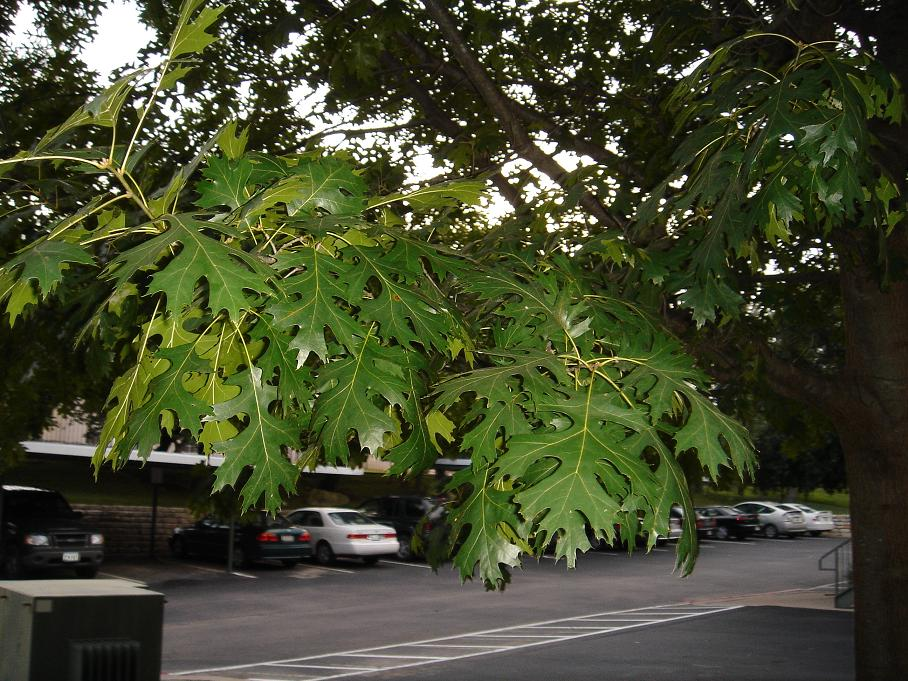
Leaves in summer

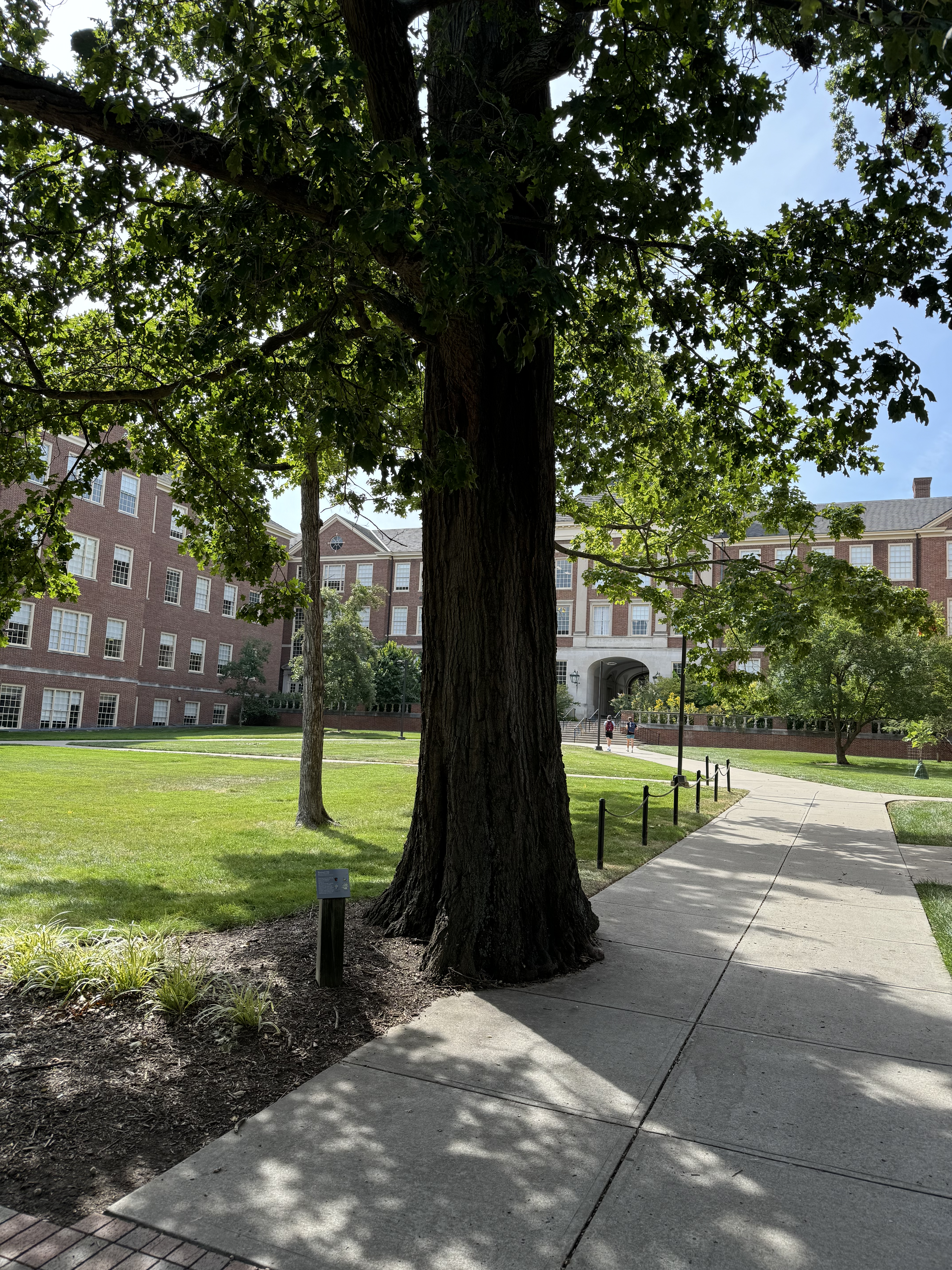
Shumard oak at Miami University, where Shumard studied.

The species was identified in an 1860 publication by Samuel Botsford Buckley, the assistant geologist of Texas, and named in honor of Benjamin Franklin Shumard, who studied at Miami University and later served as the State Geologist of Texas.

Mature Shumard oaks typically reach heights of 25 to 35 metres (82 to 115 feet), trunk diameter is typically 60 to 100 centimetres (24 to 39 inches), and crown width typically reaches 12 to 18 m (39 to 59 ft) in width. Typical size varies according to region, with larger specimens occurring in the southern portions of its native range in the United States. Record Shumard oaks have been measured at up to 60 m (200 ft) tall, with crowns up to 27.5 m (90 ft) in width. Young specimens generally exhibit conic or ovate crowns, with the upper crown filling in as the tree reaches maturity. Trunks are relatively straight and vertical. Trunks may have deeply fluted buttresses near the ground. Shumard oak is typically found in lowland areas and is able to survive where the soils experience flooding for six weeks of the year.

The young bark of the Shumard oak is light gray, very smooth, and very reflective. Shumard oak bark darkens and develops ridges and furrows as it ages. Occasionally, white splotches are seen on the bark.

Shumard oak twigs terminate in a cluster of buds. The buds are lighter in color than the olive-green twigs. The young twig is highly reflective.

The leaves are arranged alternately and are broadly obovate with 5–9 lobes, each of which is terminated by bristle-tipped teeth. The leaves mature to between 10 and 21 cm (4 and 8 in) in length. The surfaces are glabrous, except for the tufted vein axils. They are dark green on the top, while their bottoms are a slightly lighter shade of green. The leaves turn brown to red in the fall and sometimes have hues of yellow mixed in. Fall colors are relatively late; specimens in central Texas may be at their most red in early December, while Florida specimens may not color substantially until February.

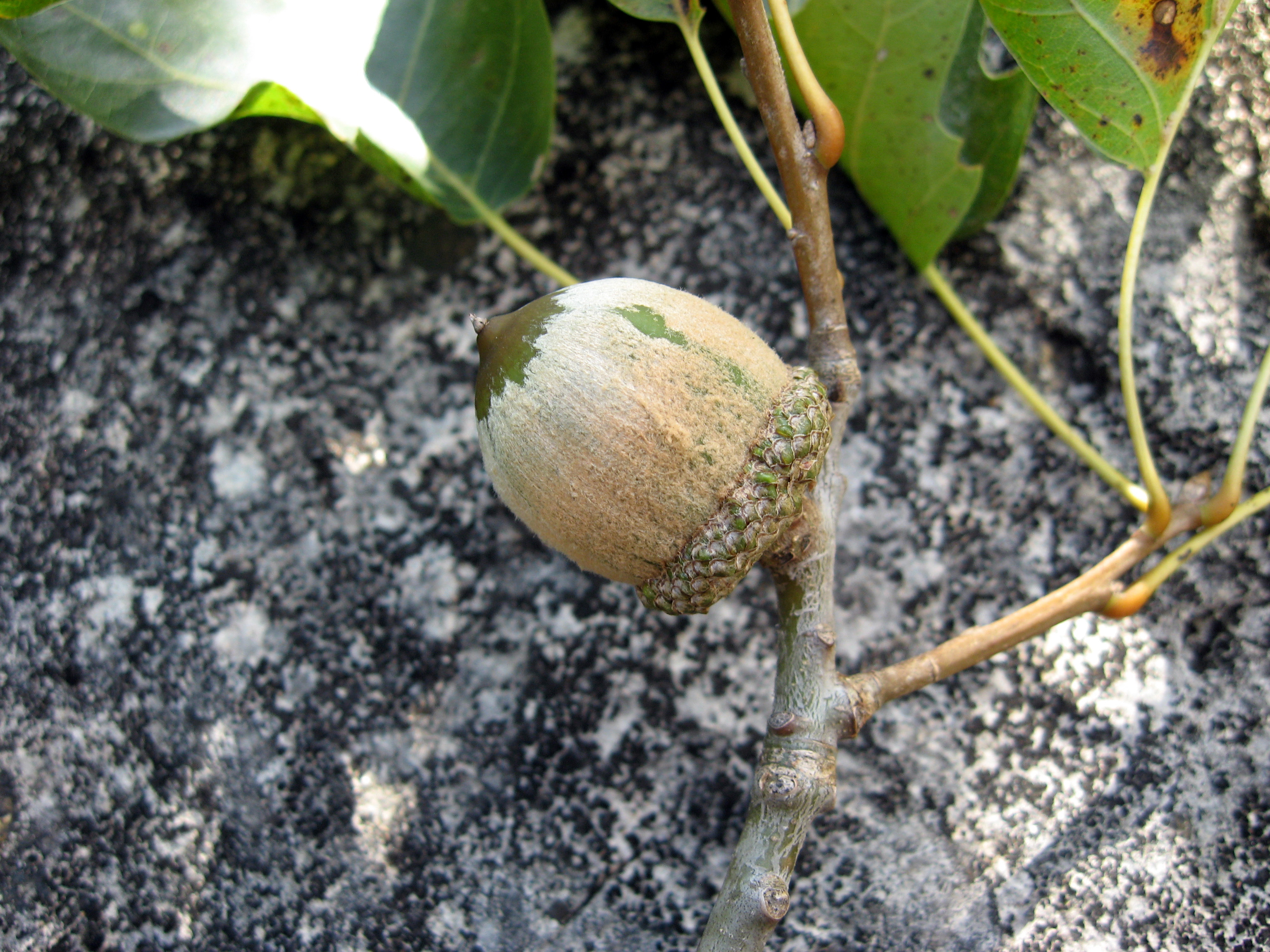
Maturing acorn

Shumard oaks bear relatively large acorns, which typically reach up to 3 cm (1 in) in diameter. Acorns take between 1.5 and 3 years to fully mature and may go unnoticed during their early stages of development.

== Distribution and habitat ==
Shumard oak is native to the Atlantic coastal plain primarily from North Carolina to northern Florida and west to central Texas; it is also found north in the Mississippi River Valley to central Oklahoma, eastern Kansas, Missouri, southern Illinois, Indiana, western and southern Ohio, Kentucky, and Tennessee. It is found locally north to southern Michigan, southern Pennsylvania, Maryland, western New York, and the extreme south of Ontario, Canada.

It is tolerant of wide ranges of pH levels in soil. It is drought-resistant, and prefers partial to full sunlight. Shumard oaks begin to bear seeds at a minimum of 25 years of age, and the optimum age for seed development is 50. They are known to have reached at least 480 years of age. The roots are intolerant to disturbance.

== Ecology ==
The acorns of the Shumard oak provide food for various songbirds, game birds such as wild turkey and quail, waterfowl, white-tailed deer, feral hogs, and various rodents such as squirrels. The leaves and twigs can also provide browse for white-tailed deer.

Oak wilt can attack all red oaks, including the Shumard oak. Other diseases that attack Shumard oaks are various fungi that can grow on the leaves, powdery mildew, canker diseases, and shoestring root.

== Uses ==
Shumard oak is valued for commercial use and as a shade tree. With the Shumard Oak's ability to tolerate and thrive in a wide range of soil types, it is cultivated at least as far north as Ottawa, Ontario and southern Quebec, and as far south as Lake Worth Beach, Florida.

Shumard oak lumber is grouped with other red oak lumber for use in flooring, furniture, interior trim, decorative molding, paneling, and cabinetry. According to one guide, the lumber of Shumard oak is considered "mechanically superior" to that of other red oaks.
