= Benjamin P. Buckner =

Mayor of Houston, Texas (1847–48)

Benjamin Pendleton Buckner served as Mayor of the city of Houston, Texas in 1847 and 1848.

Prior to serving as mayor of Houston, Buckner was the chief justice of Harris County, beginning in 1839. He served as chief justice until 1847, the first year he was elected as mayor. He served a second one-year term in 1848.

Buckner was a cousin of Confederate General Simon Bolivar Buckner.

== Citations ==
Preceded by James Bailey (American politician)	Mayor of Houston, Texas; 1847–1848	Succeeded by Francis W. Moore Jr.
