= George W. Lively =

Mayor of Houston

George W. Lively became mayor of Houston, Texas, in 1839. He was a member of the German Society.

Lively was first elected as mayor of Houston in June 1839 to complete the unexpired term of Francis W. Moore, Jr., who resigned his position. During his brief tenure, Lively expanded regulation of public health, especially regulation of the meat market. He also led an effort to improve transportation with new bridges.

Lively started a newspaper, the Weekly Times, which was in publication for less than a year. In 1840, he joined as a charter member of the first Methodist-Episcopal Church in Houston.

Preceded by Francis W. Moore Jr.	Mayor of Houston, Texas; 1839	Succeeded by Charles Bigelow
