= Edward Hopkins Cushing =

American newspaper editor

Edward Hopkins Cushing (June 11, 1829 – January 15, 1879) was a newspaper editor in Houston.

== Early life ==
Cushing was born on June 11, 1829, in Royalton, Vermont, the son of Daniel and Nancy Anthony Cushing. Daniel was a farmer. Cushing grew up on the family farm, but showed and interest in books and education. He enrolled at Dartmouth College and graduated in 1850.

== Career ==
Cushing moved to Texas in the early 1850s, while taking jobs as a teacher in Galveston, Brazoria, and Columbia. While still working in Columbia, he started writing for the local paper, the Democrat and Planter.

Cushing became owner and editor of the Houston-based Telegraph and Texas Register in 1856. Despite the name of his newspaper, the editor did not at that time have direct access to news over a telegraph wire. Instead, telegraph service from the east to New Orleans created a regional communications hub out of the Crescent City. Cushing, however, improved this communications link in 1859 by re-founding the Texas Telegraph Company. He collaborated with the Galveston, Houston, and Henderson Railroad to build and maintain a telegraph line between Houston and Galveston, shortening the communications time between the two cities.

Cushing was one of the Texas newspaper editors of the 1850s who were Democrats in the mode of John Calhoun. While Cushing was not a native southerner, but he was a booster for southern causes and policies benefitting Houston specifically. Among the latter, he used his editorship to advocate for railroad development with stations in Houston, but also the continued use of Houston as a steamship destination on Buffalo Bayou.

== Death ==
Cushing died on January 15, 1879. He was buried in Glenwood Cemetery in Houston.

== Bibliography ==
- Sibley, Marilyn McAdams (1983). Lone Stars and State Gazettes: Texas Newspapers before the Civil War. College Station: Texas A&M University Press. ISBN 0-89096-149-2.
- Turner, Suzanne; Wilson, Joanne Seale (2010). Houston's Silent Garden: Glenwood Cemetery, 1871–2009. College Station: Texas A&M University Press. ISBN 978-1-6034-4-163-6.
