= John Day Andrews =

American businessman and politician (1795–1882)

5th Mayor of Houston
- In office 1841–1842
- Preceded by: Charles Bigelow
- Succeeded by: Francis W. Moore, Jr.

Personal details
- Born: August 30, 1795 Spotsylvania County, Virginia, U.S.
- Died: August 30, 1882 (aged 87) Houston, Texas, U.S.
- Spouse: Eugenia Price Thilman
- Profession: merchant, planter, carpenter

John Day Andrews (August 30, 1795 – August 30, 1882) was a tavern keeper, carpenter, merchant, planter, and politician. He worked in Virginia as a plantation overseer and owned a tavern. He relocated to Houston around 1838, where he worked as a carpenter, a dry goods merchant, and a planter. He served as an Alderman and a mayor of Houston.

== Early life and business career ==
John Day Andrews was the son of John and Elizabeth Lipscomb Andrews, and was born in Spotsylvania County, Virginia on August 30, 1795.

Andrews arrived in Houston with his family as early as 1837.

== Public life ==
Andrews started public life in Houston in 1838, when he co-founded Christ Church in Houston. He served as the founding president of the Houston Board of Health. He served two one-year terms as mayor of Houston in 1841 and 1842, establishing the first city hall in is second year.

As Mayor of Houston, Andrews worked with the City Council to establish a wharf tax to create revenue for improvements to the port. These funds were used to dredge Buffalo Bayou and improve the steamboat landing. Another act of Andrews and City Council established the Port of Houston Authority, with a mandate to regulate all landings in Houston along Buffalo Bayou and White Oak Bayou. Andrews also led an effort to clear ship wrecks and other debris from the channel.

Andrews was a senior warden of Christ Church, Houston from 1853 through 1858.

== Personal life ==
Andrews sired Sarah Goodwin, who was born in 1814, but he did not admit this to his family. He married Eugenia Price Thilman on November 25, 1830. Thilman was a widow and Andrews adopted both of her daughters. They also had at least two daughters from their own marriage.

Andrews imported materials from the east coast of the United States and built a Greek Revival house in Houston in 1838. The house was located on land owned by his business partner, Thomas M. League. The Andrews family lived on the round floor of the house and the League family lived on the second floor.

Later, the Andrews family resided on a large suburban tract, on land that was later used as the baseball park for a Houston minor league baseball team, at the corner of Andrews and Heiner streets.

== Death ==
Andrews died in Houston on his birthday, August 30, 1882. He is buried at Glenwood Cemetery.

== Citations ==
Political offices
Preceded by Charles Bigelow	Mayor of Houston, Texas; 1841–1842	Succeeded by Francis W. Moore, Jr.
