= Telegraph and Texas Register =

Defunct American newspaper published in Texas

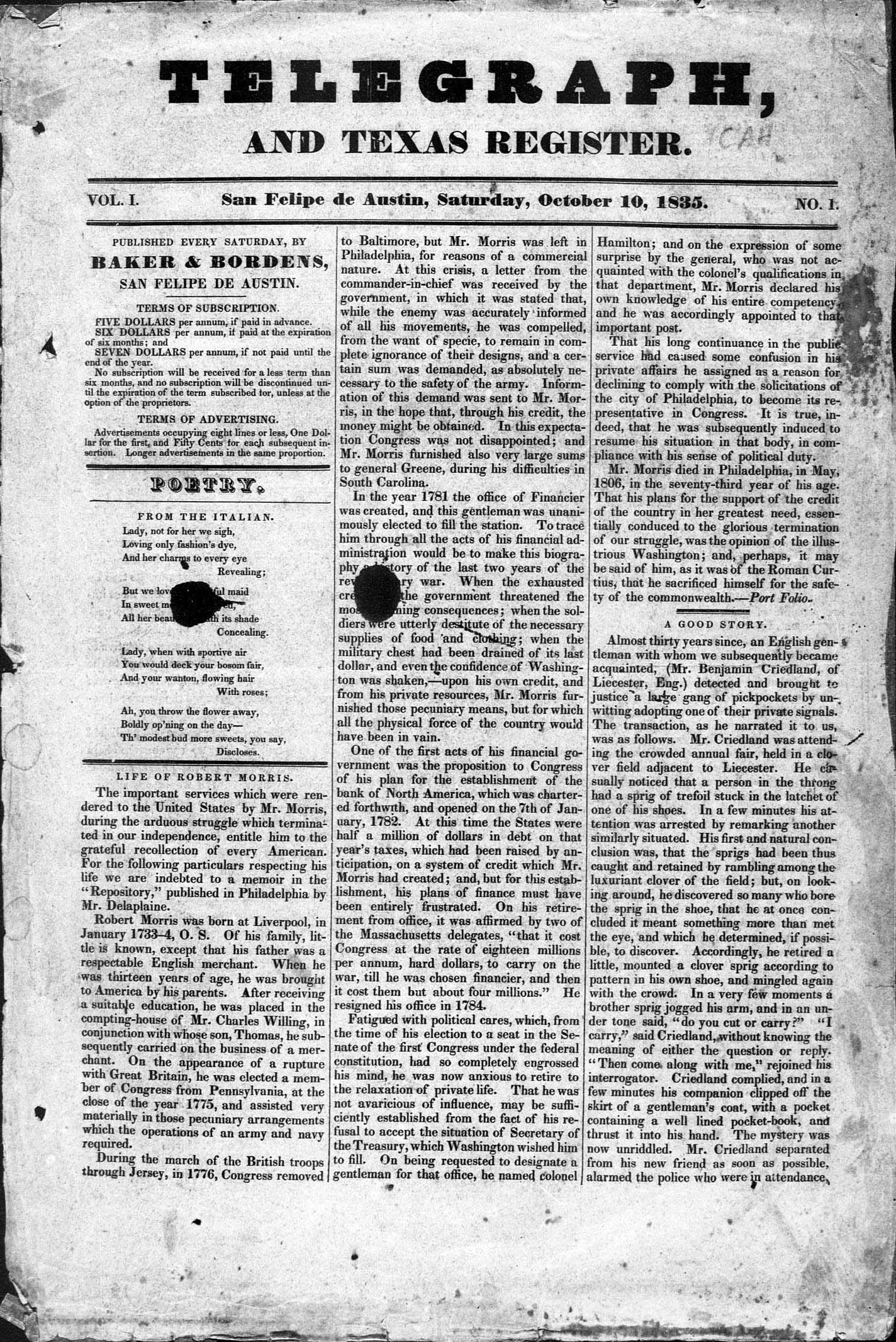
- Inaugural edition of the Telegraph and Texas Register, published October 10, 1835
- Type: Weekly (1835–1854); Tri-weekly (1854–1864); Daily (1864–1877)
- Owner: List: Gail Borden, Thomas Borden, Joseph Baker (1835–1837) Francis W. Moore, Jr., Jacob W. Cruger (1837–1851) Francis W. Moore, Jr. (1851–1854) Harvey H. Allen (1854–1856) Edward H. Cushing William J. Hutchins William G. Webb (1867–1873) Allen C. Gray (1874–1877)
- Founder(s): Gail Borden, John Pettit Borden, Joseph Baker
- Founded: August 1835
- Ceased publication: 1877; 149 years ago
- Language: English
- Headquarters: San Felipe, Texas (1835–1836); Harrisburg, Texas (1836); Columbia, Texas (1836–1837); Houston (1837–1877)
- Free online archives: Portal to Texas History

Telegraph and Texas Register (1835–1877) was the second permanent newspaper in Texas. Originally conceived as the Telegraph and Texas Planter, the newspaper was renamed shortly before it began publication, to reflect its new mission to be "a faithful register of passing events". Owners Gail Borden, John Pettit Borden, and Joseph Baker founded the paper in San Felipe de Austin, a community long at the center of Texas politics. The first issue was printed on October 10, 1835, days after the outbreak of the Texas Revolution. The first issue was printed on October 10, 1835, days after the outbreak of the Texas Revolution. Later, when John Pettit Borden left to join the Texas Revolution, brother Thomas Borden stepped in to take his place. Gail served as the editor and Tom served as the business manager. As the war for independence intensified, however, Thomas Borden and Joseph Baker joined as soldiers, and left Gail to run the paper alone.

The Telegraph continued to report news of the war and the formation of the new Republic of Texas through the end of March 1836. As the Mexican Army approached the colonies in eastern Texas, most residents fled eastward. The owners of the Telegraph and their printing press evacuated on March 30 with the rear guard of the Texian Army. The press was quickly reestablished in Harrisburg. On April 14, Mexican soldiers captured the printing press and threw it into Buffalo Bayou.

The newspaper was reestablished in August 1836 in Columbia. When the 1st Texas Congress named Houston the new capital of the Republic, the Telegraph was relocated to Houston. Faced with financial losses, the Bordens sold the paper to Francis W. Moore, Jr. and Jacob Cruger in 1837. Under Moore's leadership, the newspaper became "the most influential news organ of the Republic of Texas". In 1846, following the annexation of Texas to the United States, the newspaper changed its name to Democratic Telegraph and Texas Register.

Moore purchased Cruger's shares in 1851, then sold the entire newspaper in 1854. The new owner transformed it into a tri-weekly instead of a weekly. When the paper was sold again in 1856, Edward H. Cushing became chief editor. He guided the newspaper through the difficulties of the American Civil War, occasionally printing on wallpaper when newsprint was scarce. Following the war, the paper went through a series of owners and gradually declined until it was shuttered at the end of 1873. In March 1874 it was resurrected and briefly held the largest circulation any newspaper in Houston had ever received. It closed permanently in 1877.

== Establishment ==
In February 1835, brothers John and Gail Borden entered a partnership with Joseph Baker to publish a newspaper. Although none of the three had any previous printing experience, Baker was considered "one of the best informed men in the colony on the Texas-Mexican situation". He was the secretary of the ayuntamiento of San Felipe de Austin, a community which had long been at the center of Texas politics, and he could read Spanish well. Because San Felipe was centrally located among the colonies in eastern Texas, the group chose that location for their newspaper enterprise, hoping it would be easier to gather and distribute news.

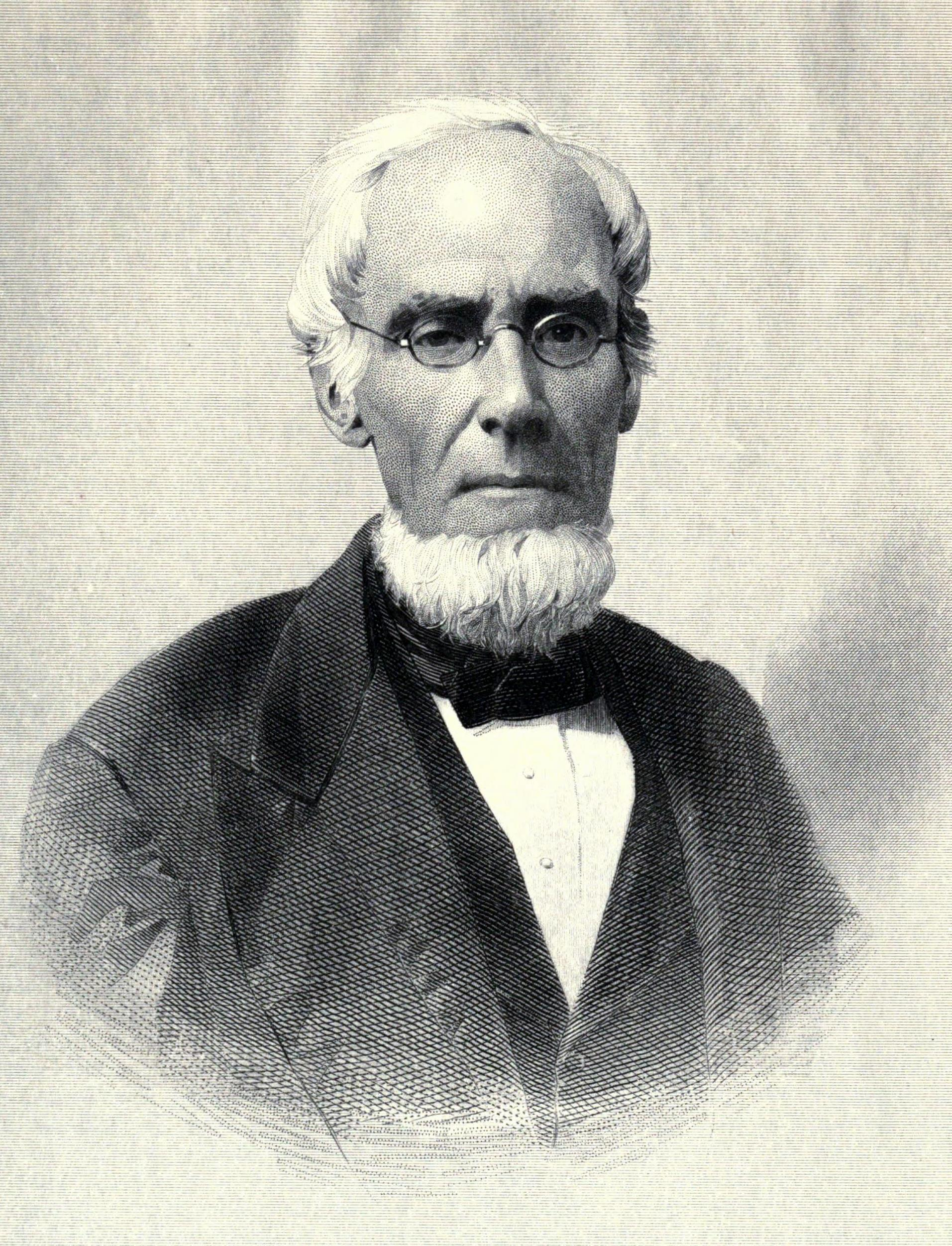
Gail Borden was one of the founders of the Telegraph and served as its first editor

They announced their venture in an advertisement in the March 15 edition of The Texas Republican, promising that the new paper, Telegraph and Texas Planter, would be "a tool to no party, but would fearlessly expose crime and critical error wherever met with". The advertisement also vowed that the new newspaper would "be ready to advocate such principles and measures as have a tendency to promote union between Texas and the Mexican Confederation, as well as to oppose everything tending to dissolve or weaken the connexion [sic] between them."

The first issue was published October 10, 1835, days after the Texas Revolution began. By this time, the owners had changed the name to Telegraph and Texas Register. In an editorial, the owners explained that the paper's original name had been chosen when "the engrossing object was the accumulating of wealth and consequent aggrandizement of the country. Since that time affairs have assumed an entirely different aspect, and the all-absorbing question is how to protect ourselves, and what we already possess." The newspaper was therefore renamed to reflect their new goal of serving as "a faithful register of passing events".

The inaugural edition contained letters from Stephen F. Austin, a report on the development of the Texian Army, translations of several Mexican documents, and reports from the Committees of Correspondance and Safety in several other communities. As editor, Gail Borden strived to be somewhat objective, avoiding blatantly biased or partisan opinions unless a counterpart was also provided.

The newspaper was published weekly. Each issue contained eight pages, with three columns of text. In earlier issues, the first page generally contained poetry and an article reprinted from another newspaper. Later issues usually had advertisements printed on the front page. The second page was miscellaneous news, while the third contained an editorial. The remaining pages were filled with ads, articles from other newspapers, and local news. Occasionally, the first two pages would contain reprints of recently released official documents.

Readers could purchase six- or twelve-month subscriptions. Those who paid in advance were charged only $5 per year. An extra dollar was added if the subscription was paid at the end of the first six months, and the price was increased to $7 if the subscription was paid at the end of the year. Advertisements were limited to 8 lines. The first time the advertisement appeared in the paper, advertisers were charged $1. Each subsequent insertion was worth 50 cents. By November 1, they had collected less than $75, although their expenses were about $250 per month.

== Texas Revolution ==
The small skirmish known as the Battle of Gonzales had occurred on October 2. Over the next few weeks, men began gathering at Gonzales to form an army. John Borden joined them, and his brother Thomas took his place in the newspaper partnership. Gail Borden wrote to Austin on October 10 that both his brother Thomas and Joseph Baker also wanted to join the army. All were worried that they would be castigated for not joining, and Gail explained that he thought the newspaper was "of more importance than their services can be in the camp." Thomas Borden joined the Siege of Bexar and on November 5, Gail Borden again refused to allow Baker to join the army because he was their only translator.

The paper's first issue was late, despite long hours worked by the printers. By the time the second issue was printed, the printers did not know where to deliver many of the subscriptions, as the subscribers had left their homes to join the army. The papers' expenses were approximately $250 each month, while it collected about $75 in its first month of operations. Borden contracted with the Consultation to print items for the interim government. By November 24, they had incurred $593.75 in costs, but the cash-strapped government was unable to provide reimbursement. The frequent public document printings caused the press to run low on newsprint, and by mid-December the Telegraph consisted of only four pages rather than eight. Gail asked his brother Thomas to travel to New Orleans to purchase more supplies, but Thomas refused to leave the army. The paper missed an edition in mid-December due to lack of paper. New supplies towards the end of 1836 allowed the Telegraph to resume service, but by February newsprint again ran low. Borden attributed this to a larger-than-expected subscriber list and frequent opportunities to publish other documents.

According to historian James Lee, the Telegraph was the most important newspaper in Texas during the Texas Revolution and was "one of the foremost papers devoted to the revolutionary cause". Historian Eugene C. Barker describes the paper as "an invaluable repository of public documents during this critical period of the state's history".

Editorials in the newspaper often compared the fighting in Texas to the American Revolution, even publishing extracts from United States documents of that era. Stephen F. Austin, leader of the Texian Army until December 1835, sent news directly from the Siege to the Telegraph's editors. Borden received news directly from other military leaders, including Jim Bowie and James Fannin, and political heavyweights such as Sam Houston and Lorenzo de Zavala.

From early December 1835 until early March 1836, there was little political stability in Texas. The Telegraph, along with the other major newspaper in the region, the Texas Republican, began printing more circumspect stories about the war after a January report in the Telegraph on a rumored counterinvasion by Mexican General Antonio Lopez de Santa Anna sparked a panic among Texas settlers. For the next few weeks, the paper primarily featured official documents and letters, with little editorial comment.

The paper at first stopped short of endorsing a full split from Mexico. The editorial in the February 20, 1836 issue stated that: "To have advocated a declaration of independence, before understanding the true situation of the Mexican government, and without any assurance of assistance from the United States, would have been a rashness to which others as well as ourselves might have fallen victim." Borden further noted that "It has never been the objective of this paper to forestall public opinion and to crowd upon the people our own views in a matter so important as that touching a change in government." Nine days later, Baker joined the army. (Note: Baker later served in the Battle of San Jacinto. Franklin (1932), p. 136.) Gail Borden, Jr and two other printers were drafted for the army on February 29 but were excused from service so that the press could continue to operate.

In February 1836, Borden seriously considered moving the press to Washington-on-the-Brazos, where the Convention of 1836 was set to meet. He scrapped those plans when another group announced plans to establish a press there. The competing publisher never formed, and Borden remained the official printer of the interim government, but at a disadvantage as he was 20 miles (32 km) from the proceedings.

On March 3, 1836 the Convention officially declared independence, creating the Republic of Texas. The publishers of the Telegraph immediately offered their services to the interim government, pledging that they were "prepared to execute any order, either at night or day". The March 5 issue noted the declaration of independence in a small blurb at the bottom of the back page. (Note: In this era, printers set as much of the type in advance as possible, generally leaving only a small area on an inside or back page for breaking news. Sibley (1983), p. 10.) More prominently displayed was the letter To the People of Texas & All Americans in the World, which Texian commander William B. Travis had written begging for reinforcements and supplies for his garrison at the Alamo. By the following issue, the Telegraph was decisively for independence, praising Consultation delegates for their "unparalleled" speed, as "the alarming situation of our country admitted of no delay". That issue also reprinted articles from the New Orleans Bulletin and the New York Evening Star which had sympathy for Texas independence. The March 12 issue also printed the letter Travis wrote to the Convention shortly before the Alamo was attacked. The original letter was misplaced or destroyed during the confusion, and the only record of it is from the newspaper edition and the thousand broadsheets the Bordens printed on order of the Convention.

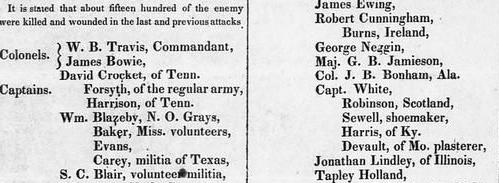
A partial scan of the March 24, 1836 edition of the Telegraph which contained the first list of defenders killed at the Battle of the Alamo

After their victory at the Battle of the Alamo on March 6, the Mexican Army began moving east into the colonies. The Texian Army, in disarray after losing so many men, began to retreat east. The newspapers in Brazoria and Nacogdoches soon stopped printing. The Telegraph–the only newspaper in Texas still operating–printed its twenty-first issue on March 24. This contained the first list of names of Texians who died at the Alamo. Borden refused to join the Runaway Scrape, asserting that "so long as a paper should be printed west of the Brazos, the people east of it would not take alarm."

On March 27, the Texas Army reached San Felipe with word that the Mexican advance guard was approaching. According to a later editorial in the Telegraph, the publishers were "the last to consent to move". The printing press was dismantled, and the Bordens brought it with them as they evacuated with the rear guard on March 30.

The interim president of the Republic of Texas, David G. Burnet, requested that Borden bring the press to Harrisburg, where the interim government had fled. The Bordens successfully set up the press in Harrisburg, and on April 13 the Telegraph was named the official paper of the Republic of Texas. The following day they began printing the first issue in Harrisburg. It contained extracts from the Constitution of the Republic of Texas and a proclamation from Burnet calling all men to arms. Only six issues were printed. Shortly after the sixth sheet was printed on April 14, Mexican soldiers arrived in Harrisburg and seized the press. The soldiers threw the type and press into Buffalo Bayou and arrested the printers. (Note: The components were later retrieved from the river, cleaned, and used to print The Morning Star, the first daily paper of the Republic of Texas. Lee (1917), p. 216.) The Texas Revolution ended one week later, when Santa Anna was captured following the Mexican defeat at the Battle of San Jacinto. For the next few months, there were no newspapers in Texas.

== Reestablishment ==
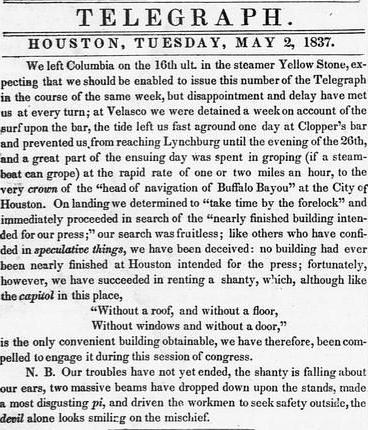
In the May 2, 1837 edition of the Telegraph, publishers explained their move to Houston.

Lacking funds to replace his equipment, in May Gail Borden asked Burnet for governmental assistance in forming another newspaper. Burnet sent Borden a draft and instructed him to visit Texas agents in New Orleans to receive payment. The Republic was bankrupt, however, and the agents were unable to provide Burnet with funds. He instead mortgaged his land and used the money to buy a new printing press in Cincinnati. The Bordens had intended to reopen their printing business in whichever city became the new capital of the republic. Although Burnet did not officially name a new capital, (Note: Burnet did not have the authority to do so. Kemp (1944), p. 3.) on July 23, Burnet called for elections for the 1st Texas Congress, which would convene in Columbia on the first Monday in October. The Bordens promptly relocated to Columbia.

The twenty-third issue of the Telegraph was published in Columbia on August 2, 1836. The first page was devoted to the new Constitution, which few Texans had seen. An editorial on the second page described the events in San Felipe and Harrisburg during the Runaway Scrape. The editorial concluded: "Notwithstanding so many embarrassments and difficulties, we announce to the citizens of Texas, that we are again prepared to do their printing, and are ready once more to defend the cause of our country." By the end of the year, over 500 readers had subscribed to the newspaper.

Although Burnet had expected the 1st Congress to name Columbia the capital, they instead chose a brand-new city, Houston. The new capital had only been founded on August 30, 1836 and the land was still being surveyed at the time of its elevation to capital. Houston and Columbia were separated by 50 miles (80 km) of boggy river bottoms. It was very difficult to transport large loads overland, so publishers made arrangements to ship the printing press via boat. On April 16, 1837, the press arrived in Houston, on the same boat as the executive departments of the Republic of Texas. The first issue to be printed in Houston appeared on May 2, 1837.

== Moore era (1837–1854) ==
The newspaper was in financial difficulty, as bills were rarely paid. Settlers moved often as they rebuilt their lives after the war and often did not pay their subscription fee. The government also provided very little toward their debt. (Note: It took almost twelve years for the government to completely repay the Bordens. Kökény (2004), p. 289.) The Bordens soon decided to leave the newspaper business. In March 1837, Thomas Borden sold his interest in the enterprise to Francis W. Moore, Jr., who took over as chief editor. Three months later, Gail Borden transferred his shares to Jacob W. Cruger. (Note: Gail Borden returned to the United States, where he founded Borden Milk Company.) The new partnership continued until April 1851, when Moore bought out Cruger.

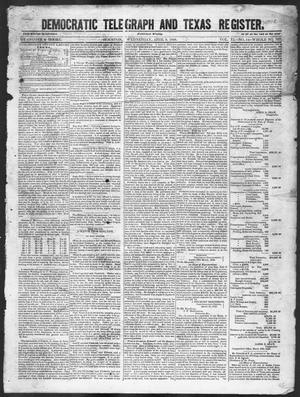
Scan of the front page of the newspaper from April 8, 1846 showing its new name, Democratic Telegraph and Texas Register

Under Moore's leadership, the newspaper became "the most influential news organ of the Republic of Texas". Most newspapers of this time period were primarily vehicles for the editor to express his views. Editors generally made little effort to gather and report news, as the information would already be widely known by the time the paper was printed. In many cases, local news was given cursory treatment, as the editor did not want to anger any of his subscribers by appearing to pick a side in a local feud. The Telegraph participated in newspaper exchange. The Republic of Texas followed the example of the United States and allowed newspaper editors to exchange papers with each other without paying postage, allowing for the quicker dissemination of information. Texas also allowed each editor to send up to 30 newspapers to editors of papers in foreign countries, which included the United States. Until 1842, the United States mirrored this practice.

Although the capital moved to Austin in 1840, the newspaper remained in Houston. (Note: When the capital was relocated, Moore and Cruger established another newspaper, The Texas Sentinel, in Austin.)

Many of the paper's articles were aimed at attracting immigrants to Texas, or retaining those who had recently arrived. Articles emphasized the good character of recent settlers (as opposed to the widespread belief that residents of Texas were scoundrels) and the advantages of living in the country. Through much of 1837, Moore wrote a series of articles describing the natural resources of Texas and the geography of various regions of the nations. Moore's series on the geography of Texas was in 1840 compiled into a book Maps and Descriptions of Texas. The book was reprinted in 1844 as Description of Texas. The articles were widely quoted in other newspapers and journals; an 1843 issue of Southern Agriculturist copied at least one Telegraph article in whole.

In 1838, the company purchased a printing press from R. Hoe & Company. The new press was powered by cranks turned by workmen.

== Ownership changes and decline ==
In 1854, Moore sold the newspaper to Harvey H. Allen, who retained it for less than two years. During that time, he expanded the newspaper to a thrice-weekly printing. Edward Hopkins Cushing became the chief editor in 1856, when Allen sold it to a corporation. Cushing later acquired all stock and became the sole owner.

The newspaper continued to publish throughout the American Civil War (1861–1865). There were no paper mills in Texas, and most Texas newspapers received newsprint from mills in the northeastern United States. A Union blockade of the Gulf Coast made newsprint even scarcer, and Cushing was forced to print the newspaper on wallpaper and wrapping paper. After Union forces closed the Mississippi River, making transportation more difficult, Cushing relied on a pony express to gather and forward news from the battlefronts. He published so many extra editions that on February 6, 1864 the newspaper officially became a daily.

After the war ended, Cushing travelled to the northern United States to purchase new equipment. When he returned to Houston his editorials began to "counsel[...] acquiescence" as he related some of the attitudes he had seen in the north. Many Texans, staunch Confederates who were still unhappy that they had lost the war, resented the advice, and the newspaper began to lose readership. Cushing sold the paper to a syndicate, which put C.C. Gillespie in charge. Gillespie's editorials reflected a very different political leaning than Cushing's but the paper continued to decline. The syndicate soon sold the paper to William J. Hutchins, who retained Gillespie as editor.

Declining sales led Hutchins to sell the paper in 1867 to William G. Webb. Webb again reversed the newspaper's political leanings, yet he was unable to make the newspaper a success. In 1873 the Telegraph suspended publication.

In March 1874, the Telegraph was resurrected by Allen C. Gray. For a time, it received the largest circulation any newspaper in Houston had ever received. The revival lasted less than three years, however. Unable to satisfy impatient creditors, on February 11, 1877 Gray ceased publication of the Telegraph.

== Editorial leanings ==
=== Borden ===
Shortly after the newspaper launched, Borden set out his philosophy that "to render the press useful it should never be prostituted to misrepresentation, slander, and vituperation." Borden used language he described as "decorous" and tried to avoid covering issues that would divide his audience. He did not write about the quarrels between the War and Peace factions as the region moved towards independence.

=== Moore ===
His reporting did not necessarily please politicians. Governor Sam Houston once referred to Moore as that "'lying scribbler of the Telegraph, whose one arm could write more malicious falsehoods than any man with two arms'". (Note: Despite his opinion of Moore's reporting, in 1860 Houston–nowGovernor of Texas–appointed Moore the State Geologist. Geiser (1944), p. 421.)

Moore included many articles explaining and justifying the Texas Revolution and the very existence of the Republic. At the same time, as early as 1837, the newspaper advocated annexation to the United States, even publishing a series of articles explaining that Texas should have been considered part of the Louisiana Purchase. In 1846, not long after Texas was annexed, Moore and Cruger changed the name of the newspaper to Democratic Telegraph and Texas Register, as they explained, "to designate the plotical tenets that we shall advocate".

== Legacy and impact ==
The Telegraph was the second permanent newspaper in Texas. It introduced printing to three towns: Harrisburg, Columbia, and Houston. According to historian Andrea Kökény, the Telegraph was "an influential molder of public opinion", which "has become an essential source to the understanding of the early history of American Texas and the construction of the identity of the people who lived in it".

According to Barker, the Telegraph "is an invaluable repository of public documents during the" Texas Revolution. All but six issues printed between its inauguration and the end of 1845 have been preserved at the University of Texas at Austin. This collection has been invaluable to researchers, especially genealogists, as there are no widespread censuses available for the Republic of Texas. Researcher Kevin Ladd compiled much of the biographical information available in the early years of the newspaper's existence into the book Gone to Texas: Genealogical Abstracts from the Telegraph and Texas Register, 1835–1841.

== Sources ==
- Barker, Eugene C. (October 1917), "Notes on Early Texas Newspapers, 1819–1836", Southwestern Historical Quarterly, 21 (2): 127–144, JSTOR 30234745
- Chariton, Wallace O. (1990), Exploring the Alamo Legends, Dallas: Republic of Texas Press, ISBN 978-1-55622-255-9
- "Dust Jackets", Southwestern Historical Quarterly, 98 (1), Texas State Historical Association, July 1994
- Franklin, Ethel Mary (October 1932), "Joseph Baker", Southwestern Historical Quarterly, 36 (2), Texas State Historical Association: 130–143, JSTOR 30235432
- Geiser, S.W. (April 1944), "Note on Dr. Francis Moore (1808–1864)", Southwestern Historical Quarterly, 47 (4), Texas State Historical Association: 419–425
- Kemp, L.W. (July 1944), "The Capitol (?) at Columbia", Southwestern Historical Quarterly, 48 (1), Texas State Historical Association: 3–9, JSTOR 30236053
- Kökény, Andrea (Summer 2004), "The Construction of Anglo-American Identity in the Republic of Texas, as Reflected in the "Telegraph and Texas Register"", Journal of the Southwest, 46 (2): 283–308
- Lee, James Melvin (1917), History of American Journalism, Boston: Houghton Mifflin Company
- McMurtrie, Douglas C. (January 1932), "Pioneer Printing in Texas", The Southwestern Historical Quarterly, 35 (3), Texas State Historical Association: 173–193, archived from the original on October 16, 2012
- Moore, Stephen L. (2004), Eighteen minutes: the battle of San Jacinto and the Texas independence campaign, Republic of Texas Press, ISBN 1-58907-009-7
- Sibley, Marilyn McAdams (2000), Lone Stars and State Gazettes: Texas Newspapers Before the Civil War, Texas A&M University Press, ISBN 978-1-58544-022-1
