= George Getz Shumard =

American geologist and surgeon (1823–1867)

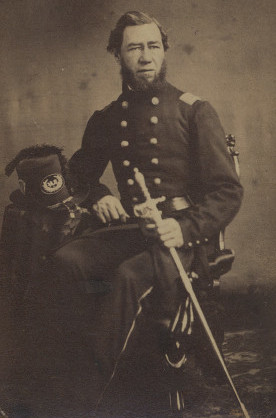
- ca. 1860s
- Born: January 10, 1823; Burlington, New Jersey, U.S.
- Died: September 29, 1867 (aged 44); Cincinnati, Ohio, U.S.
- Occupations: Geologist; surgeon
- Spouse: Isabella Clark Atkinson (m. 1859)
- Children: 3

George Getz Shumard (January 10, 1823 – September 29, 1867) was an American geologist and surgeon. In the 1850s, he took part in a number of expeditions, including the exploration of the Red River of the South, Wichita River, Brazos River, and the Llano Estacado. He later served as a surgeon in the Union Army.

== Biography ==
=== Early life ===
George Getz Shumard was born on January 10, 1823, in Burlington, New Jersey. His father was John Shumard and his mother, Ann Catherine (Getz) Shumard. His brother, Benjamin Franklin Shumard (1820–1869), went on to serve as the first state geologist of Texas.

He graduated from medical school in Louisville, Kentucky.

=== Career ===
He moved to Fort Smith, Arkansas, where he practiced as a surgeon. At the same time, he served as an assistant geologist to his brother and much of North and West Texas.

Together with Randolph B. Marcy (1812–1887) and George B. McClellan (1826–1885), he explored the Red River of the South in 1852. He kept a diary, which focused on the geology of the Northern plains from Fort Belknap in Young County, Texas to the Llano Estacado in the Texas Panhandle. His diary, together with a report on paleontology in the region, was presented to President Franklin Pierce (1804–1869), who served as the 14th President of the United States from 1853 to 1857. In 1858, it would appear in the Transactions of the Saint Louis Academy of Sciences. Several decades later, in 1886, it was published in its entirety by Hamilton P. Bee (1822–1897), who served as Texas State Commissioner.

He took part in several further explorations. In 1854, together with Marcy, he explored the Wichita River and the Brazos River. A year later, in 1855, together with John Pope (1822–1892), he explored the Llano Estacado. They travelled from Indianola to San Antonio, on to Fort Clark, up the Devil's River, up the Pecos River to Delaware Creek, and west to the Mimbres Mountains in New Mexico. From 1858 to 1861, he served as Assistant State Geologist for the Texas state geological survey, working on the Red River of the South.

He corresponded with pioneer explorer Gideon Lincecum (1793–1874), who gave a bottle of mustang wine as well as its recipe to thank Shumard for sending him a copy of his pamphlet entitled, Notice of Fossils from the Permian Strata of Texas to New Mexico.

In 1861, he moved to Cincinnati, Ohio, where he served as Ohio State Surgeon briefly before resigning. He then served on General George B. McClellan's staff as brigade surgeon. He also served as brigade surgeon under Generals William Rosecrans and John G. Mitchell. Towards the end of the war, he was medical director of Kentucky.

=== Personal life ===
Shumard married Isabella Clark Atkinson in 1859. They had three children. He died of general paralysis on September 29, 1867, in Cincinnati, Ohio.

== Legacy ==
- The Shumard Mountain (a.k.a. Shumard Peak), in the Guadalupe Mountains of West Texas, is named in his honor.
