= Buffalo Bayou, Brazos and Colorado Railway =

First operating railroad in the State of Texas

Overview
- Headquarters: Harrisburg, Texas
- Locale: Texas
- Dates of operation: 1853–1868
- Successor: Galveston, Harrisburg and San Antonio

Technical
- Track gauge: 1,435 mm (4 ft 8 1/2 in) standard gauge

The Buffalo Bayou, Brazos, and Colorado Railway (B.B.B.C. or B.B.B. & C.), also called the Harrisburg Road or Harrisburg Railroad, was the first operating railroad in Texas. It completed its first segment of track between Harrisburg, Texas (now a neighborhood of Houston) and Stafford's Point, Texas in 1853. The company established a western terminus at Alleyton, Texas prior to the Civil War. The railroad was sold after the war and reincorporated as the Galveston, Harrisburg, & San Antonio Railroad. This right of way was acquired by the Southern Pacific Railroad and is today a property of the Union Pacific Railroad.

== Name ==
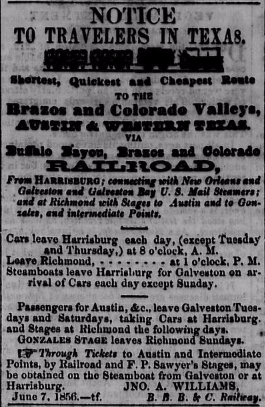
Advertisement for the BBB&C, Richmond Reporter (Richmond, Texas), 12 July 1856

The Colorado in its name refers to the Colorado River of Texas, not the state of Colorado. In the line's early days, it was often called the Harrisburg Road or the Harrisburg Railroad. In 1868, it changed owners and became the Galveston, Harrisburg, & San Antonio Railroad (reporting mark GHSA). It was the oldest component of the Southern Pacific system (reporting mark SP). Since the 1996 merger, the former Southern Pacific operates under the Union Pacific name. The old Buffalo Bayou, Brazos and Colorado right-of-way was renamed the Union Pacific-Glidden Subdivision, operating between Alleyton, Texas and the former Harrisburg, Texas, which was annexed by Houston.

== History ==
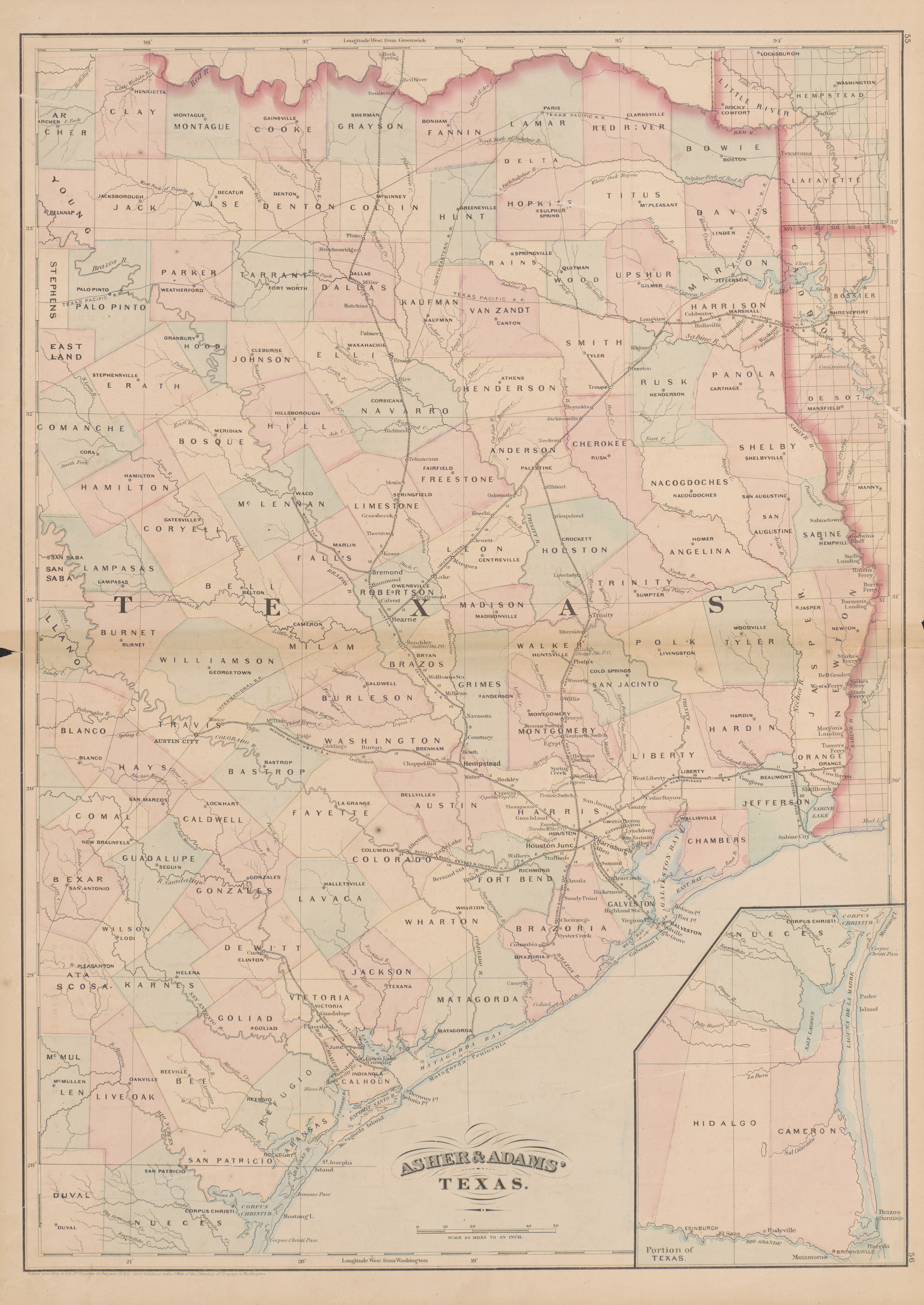
1871 map showing the Buffalo Bayou, Brazos and Colorado Railway in Texas, along with other railroads

Andrew Briscoe initiated the first attempt to establish a railroad from Harrisburg, Texas, to the Brazos and Colorado Rivers. Houston's Morning Star published a notice on May 16, 1840, entitled "Harrisburg and Brazos Railroad," that claimed, "A large number of laborers are engaged at present in throwing up the track and preparing for rails at an early season, and a greater number will soon be employed."

The first successful attempt to establish a Harrisburg Railroad line was Texian General Sidney Sherman, a hero of the Battle of San Jacinto. In 1847, Sherman purchased from the Harrisburg Town Company the unused town lots previously allocated to the failed Harrisburg and Brazos Railroad. He planned to finance the railroad with the proceeds of 1272 unsold lots totaling 3,617 acres (1,464 ha) in Harrisburg, Texas. The plan was to form a strategic relationship with Galveston, bypassing Houston for freight from the Brazos River valley. After finding northern investors, he succeeded in chartering the company by act of the Texas legislature on February 11, 1850, and organizing it on June 1 of that year. Jonathan F. Barrett was the company's first president, and the company included some of the leading men of the state: General Sherman himself, Hugh McLeod, John G. Tod, John Angier, William Marsh Rice, Ebenezer Allen, William A. van Alstyne, James H. Stevens, Benjamin A. Shepherd, and William J. Hutchins.

Surveying began in 1851 near Buffalo Bayou. The roadbed was graded by Benjamin Franklin Terry, who would later lead Terry's Texas Rangers. The next year, the first locomotive, the General Sherman, was received and the first track laid. By August 1853, twenty miles (32 km) had been completed to Stafford Point. The charter called for the line to connect Harrisburg to the state capitol at Austin. The line reached Richmond on the Brazos in 1855, Eagle Lake in 1859, and Alleyton in 1860. Although the Civil War stopped construction towards Austin, the citizens of Columbus, Texas, constructed a 2 1/2-mile (4 km) branch track on their own, connecting their town to the rail at Alleyton to avoid being passed by.

With the financial collapse of Texas during Reconstruction, the line failed. Fortunate in that it had been constructed using standard gauge, its track and rolling stock were purchased and reincorporated as the Galveston, Harrisburg, & San Antonio Railroad. The route was directed towards San Antonio, rather than Austin, using the Columbus branch as part of the new main line. The new owners also constructed the first telegraphs along the route. After reaching San Antonio, the road was continued to El Paso, where it met the Southern Pacific and ensured that that line's transcontinental route would use the southern portion of Texas rather than the north.

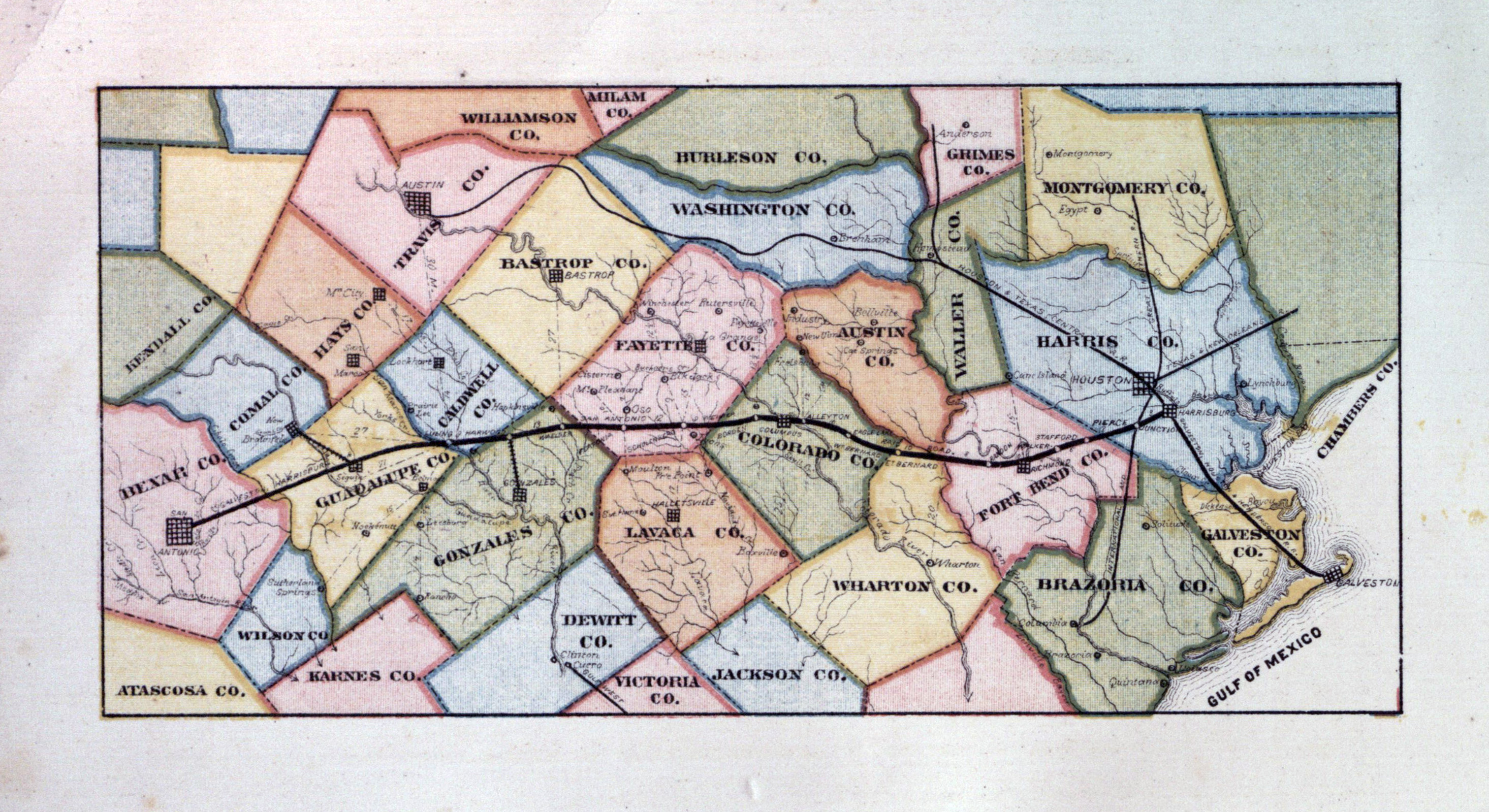
1876 map of the Galveston, Harrisburg, & San Antonio Railroad

Sometimes the line is represented as originating in Houston. While the extant tracks currently have their eastern terminus at the Port of Houston, this location was within the boundaries of Harrisburg, Texas when the Harrisburg Railroad was originally developed. In the mid-19th century, the two cities were several miles apart and in stiff competition with one another. In fact, railroad raised capitol through the sale of town lots in Harrisburg, so the railroad and the town were part of the same enterprise. The Harrisburg Railroad brought the city some prosperity, but the Tap connected Houston to the B.B.B.C. lines in 1858 and after Charles Morgan's Texas and New Orleans Railroad completed a connection between Houston and New Orleans in 1880, even the Galveston, Harrisburg, & San Antonio line sold their properties within Harrisburg and moved to the new hub. Later, the City of Houston annexed Harrisburg, making the former town a neighborhood within Houston, some of which was developed as the Port of Houston.

At the end of 1924 (before adding SA&AP), it operated 1,380 miles (2,220 km) of railroad on 1,890 miles (3,040 km) of track.

== Locomotives ==
Name	Builder	s/n	Build date	Whyte type	Notes
General Sherman	Baldwin			4-2-0	Purchased on October 12, 1852; named for Sidney Sherman; sold July 1870 to GH&SA; quickly off roster.
Texas					
Austin	Lowell	139	1854	4-4-0	Sold July 1870 to GH&SA; off roster by 1884.
Columbus	Hinkley		1857	4-4-0	Sold July 1870 to GH&SA; off roster by 1882.
Richmond	Norris		August 1859	4-4-0	Sold July 1870 to GH&SA; off roster by 1882.
Harrisburg	Hinkley	660			
Harrisburg	Norris		August 1859	4-4-0	Sold July 1870 to GH&SA; off roster by 1882.
Ames					Purchased in October 1868
Barrett					Purchased in October 1868; sold July 1870 to GH&SA; pulled the first train into San Antonio in February 1877

== See also ==
- The Sunset Limited
- List of Texas railroads
