= Francis W. Moore Jr. =

Mayor of Houston and newspaper publisher

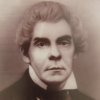

2nd, 6th & 11th Mayor of Houston
- In office 1838–1839
- Preceded by: James Sanders Holman
- Succeeded by: George W. Lively
- In office 1843–1843
- Preceded by: John Day Andrews
- Succeeded by: Horace Baldwin
- In office 1849–1852
- Preceded by: Benjamin P. Buckner
- Succeeded by: Nathan Fuller

Personal details
- Born: April 20, 1808 Salem, Massachusetts, U.S.
- Died: September 1, 1864 (aged 56) Duluth, Minnesota, U.S.
- Resting place: Green-Wood Cemetery
- Spouse: Elizabeth Mofat Wood (m. 1840)
- Children: 9

Francis W. Moore Jr. (April 20, 1808 – September 1, 1864) became the second mayor of Houston, Texas, in 1838. He was elected twice more and served as mayor of the city in three consecutive decades, the 1830s, 1840s, and 1850s. He was the co-publisher of the Telegraph and Texas Register, a newspaper in Houston.

== Early life ==
Francis W. Moore Jr. was born on April 20, 1808, in Salem, Massachusetts. His father, Francis W. Moore, studied medicine at Harvard University. The Moores relocated to Livingston, New York, in 1828. The younger Moore lost an arm in his youth. By 1834, he moved to Bath, New York, where he enrolled as a law student and worked as a teacher.

== Career ==
Moore volunteered as a Buckeye Ranger, a military unit fighting for Texas Independence from Mexico in 1836.

=== Telegraph and Texas Register ===
In March 1837, Moore purchased Thomas Borden's shares in the Telegraph and Texas Register. Moore was co-owner with Gail Borden and soon took over as editor-in-chief. At the time, the newspaper was located in Columbia. The 1st Texas Congress had been expected to name Columbia the capital of the new Republic of Texas. Instead, they chose the brand-new city of Houston. The publishers made plans to move the press to Houston. Houston and Columbia were separated by 50 miles (80 km) of boggy river bottoms. It was very difficult to transport large loads overland, so publishers made arrangements to ship the printing press via boat. On April 16, 1837, the press arrived in Houston, on the same boat as the executive departments of the Republic of Texas.

The first issue to be printed in Houston appeared on May 2, 1837. In late June, Gail Borden transferred his shares to Jacob W. Cruger. (Note: Gail Borden returned to the United States, where he founded Borden Milk Company.) The partnership between Moore and Cruger continued until April 1851, when Moore bought out Cruger.

Under Moore's leadership, the newspaper became "the most influential news organ of the Republic of Texas". Although the capital moved to Austin in 1840, the newspaper remained in Houston. When the capital was relocated, Moore and Cruger established another newspaper, The Texas Sentinel, in Austin. His reporting did not necessarily please politicians. Governor Sam Houston once referred to Moore as that "'lying scribbler of the Telegraph, whose one arm could write more malicious falsehoods than any man with two arms'".

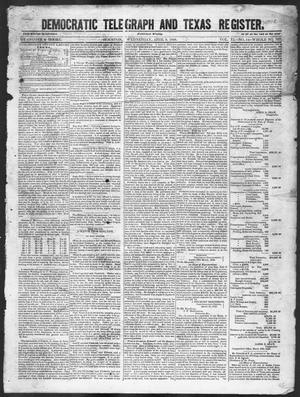
Scan of the front page of the newspaper from April 8, 1846 showing its new name, Democratic Telegraph and Texas Register

Many of the paper's articles were aimed at attracting immigrants to Texas, or retaining those who had recently arrived. Articles emphasized the good character of recent settlers (as opposed to the widespread belief that residents of Texas were scoundrels) and the advantages of living in the country. Through much of 1837, Moore wrote a series of articles describing the natural resources of Texas and the geography of various regions of the nations. Moore's series on the geography of Texas was in 1840 compiled into a book Maps and Descriptions of Texas. The book was reprinted in 1844 as Description of Texas. The articles were widely quoted in other newspapers and journals; an 1843 issue of Southern Agriculturist copied at least one Telegraph article in whole.

Moore included many articles explaining and justifying the Texas Revolution and the very existence of the Republic. At the same time, as early as 1837, the newspaper advocated annexation to the United States, even publishing a series of articles explaining that Texas should have been considered part of the Louisiana Purchase. In 1846, not long after Texas was annexed, Moore and Cruger changed the name of the newspaper to Democratic Telegraph and Texas Register, as they explained, "to designate the plotical tenets that we shall advocate".

Moore designed the Seal of Houston, adopted on February 24, 1840. He was paid $50 for his work.

In 1854, Moore sold the newspaper to Harvey H. Allen.

=== Politics ===
Moore was elected as mayor of Houston in 1838. The second mayor of Houston established the first municipal police force. Using both the mayor's office and the printing press, he protested the practice of dueling and attempted to mediate disputes in order to prevent duels.

=== Geologist ===
Despite his opinion of Moore's reporting, in 1860 Sam Houston–now Governor of Texas–appointed Moore the State Geologist, replacing Benjamin F. Shumard.

== Personal life ==
Moore wedded Elizabeth Mofat Wood in 1840, whom he had known in Bath, New York. The Moores had nine children.

== Death and legacy ==
Moore died in Duluth, Minnesota, on September 1, 1864. He is interred in Brooklyn, New York, at Green-Wood Cemetery.

== Sources ==
- Barker, Eugene C. (October 1917), "Notes on Early Texas Newspapers, 1819–1836" (PDF), Southwestern Historical Quarterly, 21 (2): 127–144, JSTOR 30234745
- Benham, Priscilla (1998). "Houston's Mayors: Developing a City". East Texas Historical Journal. 36 (1).
- Carroll, H. Bailey Carroll (April 1944), "Texas Collection" (PDF), Southwestern Historical Quarterly, 47 (4), Texas State Historical Association: 419–425, JSTOR 30237453
- Kemp, L.W. (July 1944), "The Capitol (?) at Columbia" (PDF), Southwestern Historical Quarterly, 48 (1), Texas State Historical Association: 3–9, JSTOR 30236053
- Kökény, Andrea (Summer 2004). "The Construction of Anglo-American Identity in the Republic of Texas, as Reflected in the "Telegraph and Texas Register"" (PDF). Journal of the Southwest. 46 (2): 283–308. JSTOR 40170291.
- Lee, James Melvin (1917), History of American Journalism, Houghton Mifflin Company
- McMurtrie, Douglas C. (January 1932). "Pioneer Printing in Texas" (PDF). The Southwestern Historical Quarterly. 35 (3). Texas State Historical Association: 173–193. JSTOR 30237290.

Preceded by James Sanders Holman	Mayor of Houston, Texas; 1838–1839	Succeeded by George W. Lively
Preceded by John Day Andrews	Mayor of Houston, Texas; 1843	Succeeded by Horace Baldwin
Preceded by Benjamin P. Buckner	Mayor of Houston, Texas; 1849–1852	Succeeded by Nathan Fuller
