= Lewis Wesley Cutrer =

Mayor of Houston, Texas, US

Lewis Cutrer
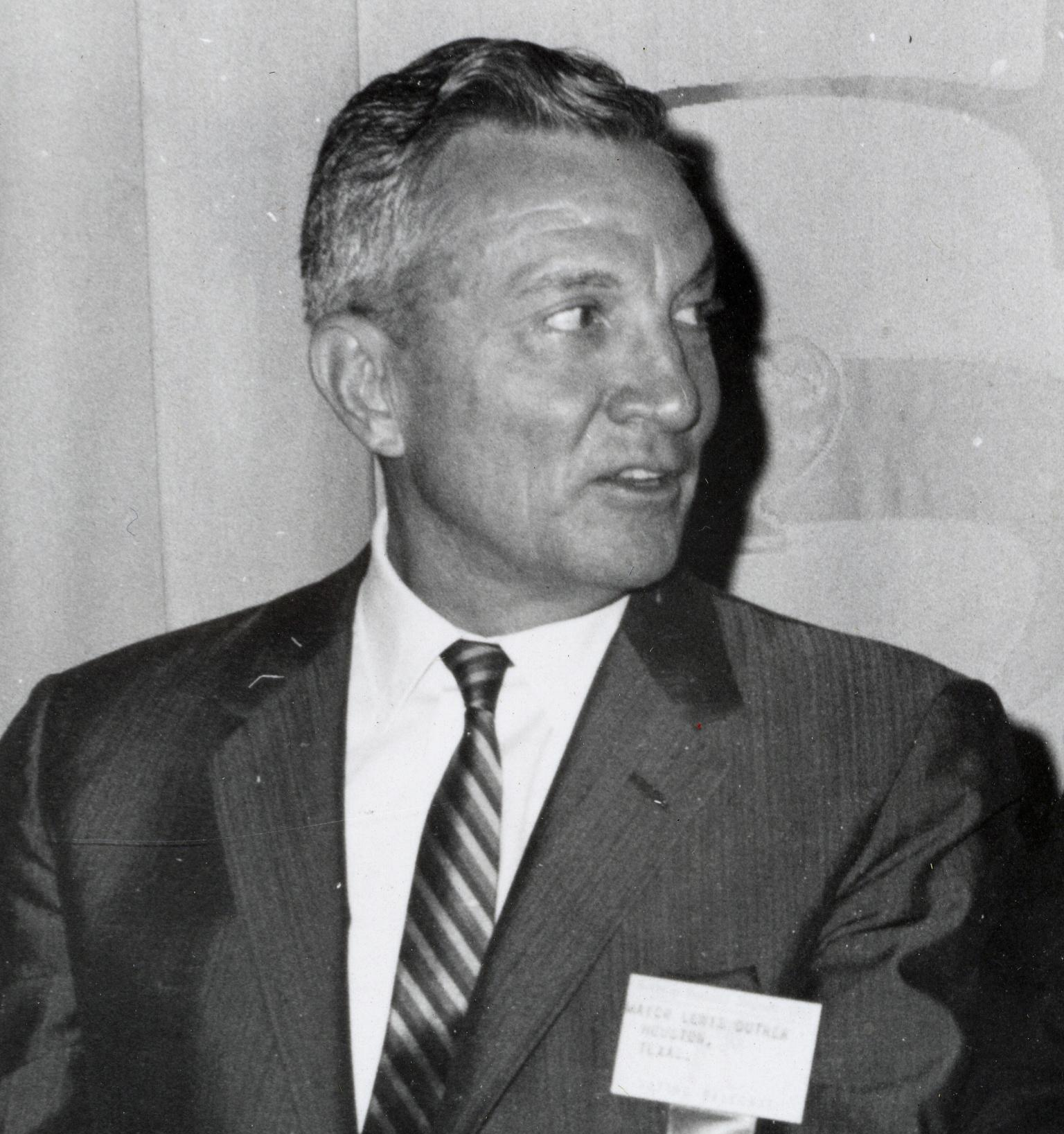

53rd Mayor of Houston
- In office January 2, 1958 – January 2, 1964
- Preceded by: Oscar Holcombe
- Succeeded by: Louie Welch

36th President of the National League of Cities
- In office 1963
- Preceded by: Gordon S. Clinton
- Succeeded by: John F. Collins

Personal details
- Born: Lewis Wesley Cutrer; November 5, 1904 Osyka, Mississippi, U.S.
- Died: May 7, 1981 (aged 76) Houston, Texas, U.S.
- Resting place: Memorial Oaks Cemetery Houston, Texas
- Party: Democratic
- Spouse: Catherine Hopson
- Children: 3
- Education: University of Mississippi
- Profession: Attorney

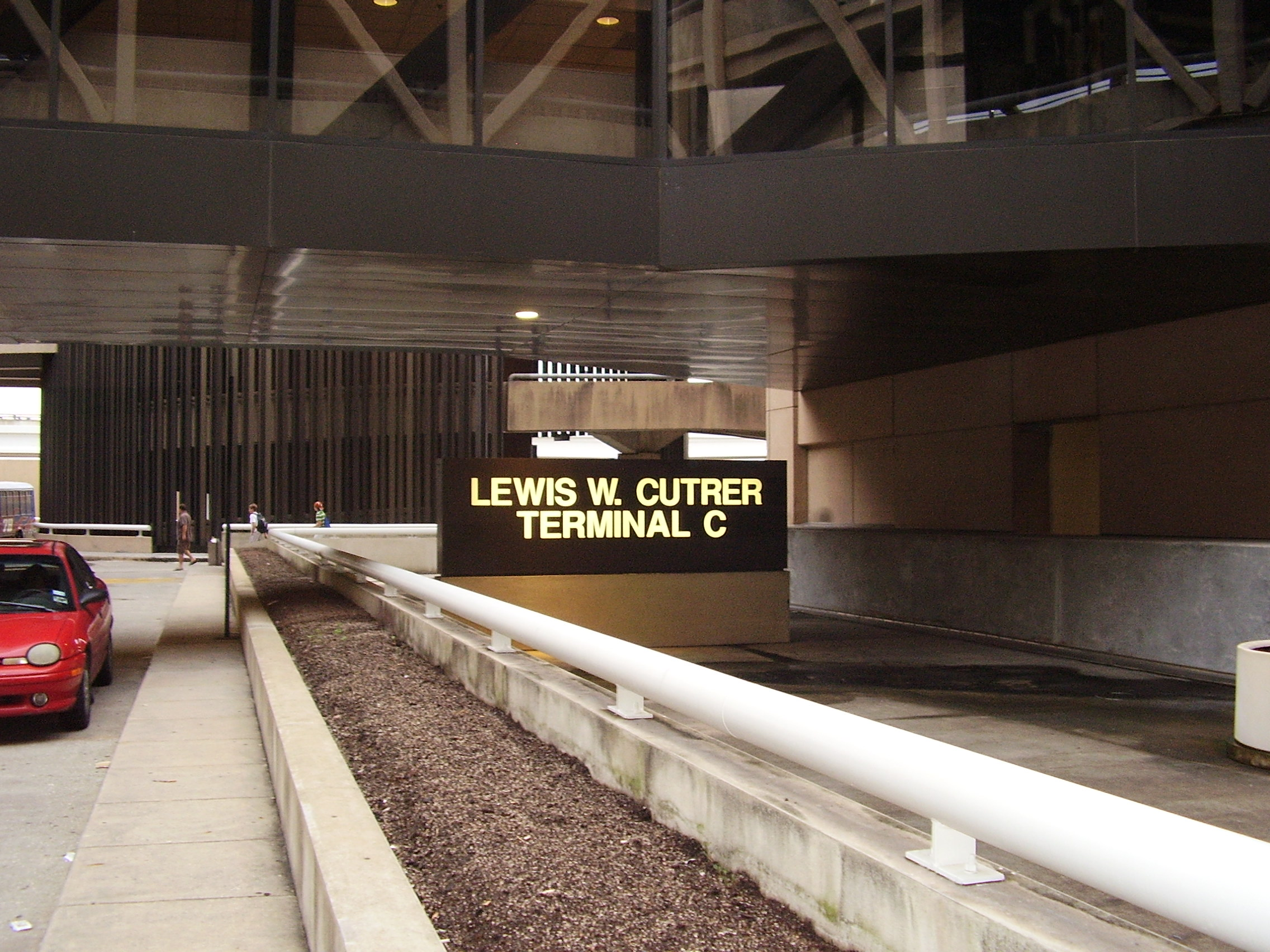
Lewis W. Cutrer Terminal C at George Bush Intercontinental Airport is named after Cutrer.

Lewis Wesley Cutrer (November 5, 1904 – May 7, 1981) served as Mayor of Houston, Texas from 1957 to 1963. Among his chief accomplishments while in office were the construction of Houston Intercontinental Airport (now George Bush Intercontinental Airport) and the Lake Livingston development project.

== Early life ==
Cutrer was the son of Richard Wiltz and Elizabeth Lewis Cutrer. He was born in Osyka, Mississippi on November 5, 1904. He grew up in Magnolia, Mississippi. He attended the University of Mississippi, where he earned a law degree.

== Career ==
After starting his law career in private practice for two years, Cutrer entered the public sector as assistant city attorney in 1929, during Walter Monteith's mayoralty. He served for the length of Monteith's term, ending in 1933, and accepted a position with Monteith's new law firm in 1934, where he practiced for five years. He returned to the City of Houston as city attorney, working for mayors Cornelius A. Pickett and Otis Massey for most of the 1940s. He worked in the mayoral election campaigns for Fred Hofheinz in the early 1950s. He was General Council for Houston Independent School District in 1955 and 1956.

Cutrer ran for Mayor of Houston in 1957, running against incumbent Oscar Holcombe on a reform platform. Given his work and support on behalf of Hofheinz, many voters understood Cutrer as the Hofheinz candidate, although he was better aligned politically with Monteith. City of Houston elections did not include primaries, and the locally-dominant Democratic Party did not endorse or fund candidates. Yet the election was framed as the liberal Cutrer challenging the conservative Holcombe.

Cutrer won the 1957 election with 67,600 votes to 39,156 votes for Holcombe. When Cutrer officially entered office on January 2, 1958, the city of Houston had already expanded to 349 square miles, containing over 800,000 residents. This expanding land area and population required an infrastructure program, and in 1958, he quickly proposed and passed a two-year bond referendum, authorizing up to $35 million in new debt. Priorities included finding a new source of fresh water, developing a second airport, improving the local bus system, and a new hospital.

== Personal life ==
Cutrer married Catherine Hopson on October 11, 1927. He was the father of three children. He served leadership roles in St. Luke's United Methodist Church in Houston. He was also a member of a local Masonic lodge.

== Death and legacy ==
Cutrer died on May 7, 1981 in Houston. He was buried at Memorial Oaks Cemetery in Houston.

The Houston Airport System named Lewis W. Cutrer Terminal C at George Bush Intercontinental Airport after Cutrer.

Political offices
Preceded by Oscar Holcombe	Mayor of Houston, Texas; 1958–1964	Succeeded by Louie Welch
