= Hofheinz =

Hofheinz is a surname. Notable people with the surname include:

- Fred Hofheinz (born 1938), American politician
- Roy Hofheinz (1912–1982), American judge
- Roy Hofheinz Jr. (born 1935), American academic and sinologist

== See also ==
- Margret Hofheinz-Döring (1910–1994), German painter and graphic artist
- Hofheinz Pavilion, a basketball venue in Houston, Texas
