= Jim McConn =

American mayor (1928-1997)

56th Mayor of Houston
- In office January 2, 1978 – January 2, 1982
- Preceded by: Fred Hofheinz
- Succeeded by: Kathryn J. Whitmire

Personal details
- Born: March 15, 1928 Tulsa, Oklahoma, U.S.
- Died: March 14, 1997 (aged 68) Houston, Texas, U.S.
- Party: Republican
- Spouse: Marjorie Gougenheim (m. 1947)
- Children: 6
- Education: University of Notre Dame
- Profession: Businessman

James Joseph McConn (March 15, 1928 – March 14, 1997) was the mayor of Houston, Texas from 1978 to 1982. He is the second and last Republican to hold that office as of 2025.

== Early life ==
McConn was born in Tulsa, Oklahoma. He moved with his family to Houston in 1939, where he met Marjorie Gougenheim, whom he married in 1947. He attended the University of Notre Dame in South Bend, Indiana, and then returned to Houston, where he became engaged in the building-materials business and then in home construction.

== Career ==
=== Construction ===
McConn became president of the Greater Houston Homebuilders Association in 1969, and from there became known in local politics, having been appointed to a vacant seat on the Houston City Council by then Mayor Louie Welch in 1971.

=== Politics ===
McConn was reelected to the council in 1973, but did not run in 1975. In 1977, he ran for mayor. In the first round, he lost by a large margin to conservative former district attorney Frank Briscoe, but he won the runoff election due in large part to support from minority voters and endorsements from other first-round candidates. He won reelection in 1979 against councilman Louis Macey, but lost to Kathy Whitmire in 1981.

After leaving office, McConn served as vice president of the Houston Sports Association, which at the time owned the Houston Astros baseball team (1981–1989), and as director of the Greater Houston Convention and Visitors Bureau (1989–1997).

== Personal life ==
McConn married Marjorie Gougenheim of Houston in 1947. They had six children.

== Death ==
McConn died of cancer at the age of sixty-eight. He was in hospice care in the Texas Medical Center in Houston.

Political offices
Preceded by Fred Hofheinz	Mayor of Houston, Texas; 1978–1982	Succeeded by Kathryn J. Whitmire
