= Richard H. Fonville =

American politician

46th Mayor of Houston
- In office January 2, 1937 – January 2, 1939
- Preceded by: Oscar F. Holcombe
- Succeeded by: Oscar F. Holcombe

Personal details
- Born: April 30, 1882 Texas, U.S.
- Died: December 13, 1954 (aged 72) Eagle Lake, Texas, U.S.
- Spouse: Clara McCormick (m. 1926)

Richard Henry Fonville (April 30, 1882 – December 13, 1954) was an American politician and pharmacist who served as the 46th mayor of Houston from 1937 to 1939.

== Mayoralty ==
Fonville defeated incumbent Oscar F. Holcombe and took office in 1937. During his term as mayor, the City of Houston Fire Station No. 11 was built. Today, it is the only historic Art Deco-style fire station remaining in Houston and one of the last remaining examples of civic architecture in Houston dating from the early 20th century. In 1938, Fonville announced a roundup of the prostitutes in Houston at the old Jefferson Davis Hospital, the purpose of this act was to check for venereal diseases. On July 30, 1938, he renamed the Houston Municipal Airport as the "Howard Hughes Airport" as part of the welcoming ceremony at the Houston Hughes homecoming.

== Personal life ==
Fonville married Clara McCormick in 1926. He died at his Eagle Lake hunting lodge of a heart ailment on December 13, 1954. In 1960, Fonville Middle School in Houston was posthumously named after him.

Political offices
Preceded by Oscar F. Holcombe	Mayor of Houston; 1937–1939	Succeeded by Oscar F. Holcombe
