= Susan Hart =

American actress

- Born: Dorothy Neidhart; Wenatchee, Washington, USA
- Occupation: Actress
- Years active: 1961–1971
- Employer: American International Pictures
- Known for: Actress in AIP films
- Notable work: The Ghost in the Invisible Bikini; Pajama Party; Dr. Goldfoot and the Bikini Machine
- Spouse(s): James H. Nicholson (m. 1964; died 1972) Roy Hofheinz Jr. (m. 1981; died 2023)
- Children: 1
- Relatives: Roy Hofheinz (father-in-law); Fred Hofheinz (brother-in-law)

Susan Hart (born Dorothy Neidhart) is an American actress, and the widow of American International Pictures (AIP) co-founder James H. Nicholson.

== Early years ==
Hart was born Dorothy Neidhart in Wenatchee, Washington. Her parents were George and Dorothy Neidhart, and she had four siblings.

Before she became an actress, Hart worked for a telephone company in Palm Springs, managed a dress shop in California, and sold clothes in Hawaii.

== Career ==
She is best known for her appearances in four popular AIP films of the 1960s, The Ghost in the Invisible Bikini, Pajama Party, and the Vincent Price vehicles Dr. Goldfoot and the Bikini Machine and City Under the Sea, and two non-AIP movies, For Those Who Think Young and Ride the Wild Surf. The latter led to her being put under contract by AIP.

In 2003, a Golden Palm Star on the Palm Springs, California, Walk of Stars was dedicated to her.

== Personal life ==
Hart was married to producer James H. Nicholson in 1964, shortly after he had divorced his previous wife. They had one child and remained married until Nicholson's death in 1972. Hart remarried to historian Roy Hofheinz Jr. in 1981. Hofheinz died in 2023.

== Movies ownership ==
Hart now owns the rights to 11 movies made by her late husband's company: It Conquered the World (1956) and its 1966 remake Zontar, The Thing from Venus, Invasion of the Saucer Men (1957) and its 1965 remake The Eye Creatures, I Was a Teenage Frankenstein (1957), I Was a Teenage Werewolf (1957), The Amazing Colossal Man (1957), Terror from the Year 5000 (1958), Apache Woman (1955), The Oklahoma Woman (1956) and Naked Paradise (1957).

== Television ==
In 1963 Hart appeared as a guest star on The Virginian in the episode "Echo of Another Day." in 1965 she appeared in the season 2, Episode 19 episode of the Beverly Hillbillies entitled "The Race for Queen".In 1968, she also appeared as Rhoda in Season 4 of The Wild Wild West, in the episode "The Night of the Fugitives" (The Wild Wild West, The Complete Series, DVD Set, CBS, 2016).

== Selected filmography ==
- Alfred Hitchcock Presents (1962) (Season 7 Episode 15: "The Door Without a Key") as Marti Thomas (uncredited)
