= Walter E. Monteith =

American politician and jurist

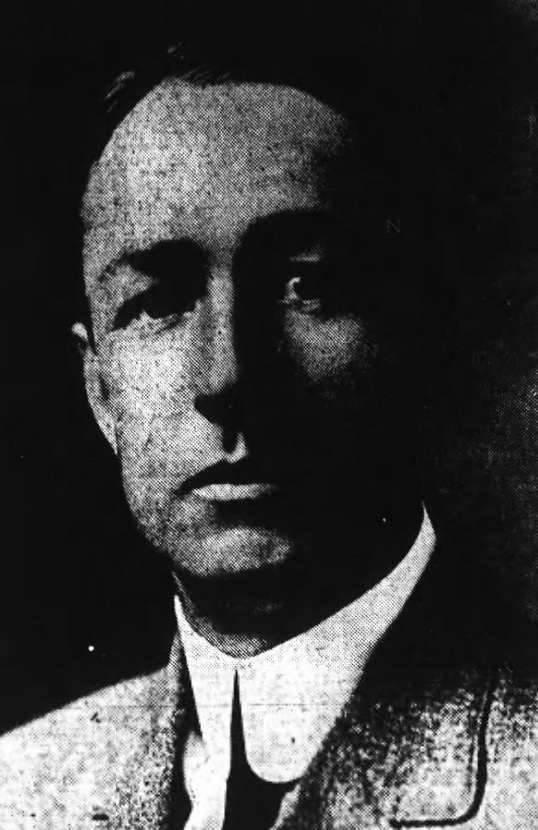

44th Mayor of Houston
- In office January 2, 1929 – January 2, 1933
- Preceded by: Oscar F. Holcombe
- Succeeded by: Oscar F. Holcombe

Chief Justice of the Texas 1st Court of Civil Appeals
- In office 1939–1953
- Preceded by: Robert A. Pleasants
- Succeeded by: William P. Hamblen, Jr.

District Court Judge, 61st Judicial District, Harris County, Texas
- In office 1919–1928

Personal details
- Born: September 9, 1877 Belton, Texas
- Died: July 28, 1953 (aged 75) Houston, Texas
- Resting place: North Belton Cemetery, Belton, Texas
- Party: Democratic
- Spouse: Vera Morey (m. 1908; died 1977)
- Children: 1 son
- Education: Bachelor of Laws, University of Texas (1901)

Walter Embree Monteith (September 9, 1877 – July 28, 1953) was an American politician, jurist, and cattle rancher. He is best known for serving as the 44th mayor of Houston, Texas and as the Chief Justice of the Texas 1st Court of Civil Appeals. Monteith served as a district court judge in Harris County, Texas, before becoming mayor, and later went on to serve as Chief Justice. In addition to his legal and political careers, he was also a successful cattle ranch owner.

== Personal life ==
Walter Embree Monteith was born on September 9, 1878, in Belton, Texas, to Arthur McArthur Monteith and Nancy Wilhoit "Hitie" (née Embree) Monteith. He graduated from Belton Male Academy in 1896.

Monteith entered the University of Texas in Austin in 1896, where he studied in the Academic Department from 1896 to 1899 and then in the Law Department from 1899 to 1901. He received his Bachelor of Laws degree in 1901.

While at the University of Texas, Monteith was a member of the Athenæum Literary Society and the Rusk Literary Society, both of which focused on debate and public speaking. In addition to his academic pursuits, Monteith was involved in athletics, serving as assistant manager for the football team in 1899. He received his varsity letter ("T") in both 1899 and 1900.

After law school, Monteith practiced law in Belton until 1906, when he served as land commissioner until 1909. He married Vera Morey on February 27, 1908. They were the parents of one son, Walter Worey Monteith, who died in a plane crash in 1941.

In 1909, Monteith moved to Houston, Texas where he practiced law.

From June to December 1918, Monteith attended the Field Artillery Central Officers Training School (FACOTS) at Camp Zachary Taylor, in Louisville, Kentucky.

Monteith went on to serve as judge in the county courts, the mayor of Houston, and Chief Justice in the appeals court.

Walter Monteith died on July 28, 1958, in Houston, Texas at the age of 75. He was buried in the North Belton Cemetery, in Belton. He was survived by his wife, Vera, who died in 1977 at the age of 97.

== Judicial and political career ==
=== Judge in Harris County, Texas ===
Monteith's judicial career began in Houston in 1916, serving as a Judge of the Harris County Civil Court at Law for 4 years. He then served as the presiding Judge of the 61st Judicial Court for Harris County from 1919 to 1928.

=== Mayor of Houston (1929-1933) ===
In the 1928, Monteith ran against incumbent Oscar F. Holcombe. He had the backing of Will C. Hogg, after Hogg found that Holcombe had personally profitted from sale of property to the city. He also had the support of Oveta Culp Hobby, who would become assistant to the city attorney during Monteith's administration.

Monteith's campaign motto was "Every Issue ·Shall Be Met Forthrightly and a Prompt Decision Rendered". His platform was, as he stated, a continuation of the principles of his previous office as judge.

- Constructive progress with business-like principles of economy
- No favoritism in the letting of public contracts
- Careful supervision of public works to prevent waste and inefficiency
- Development of public projects for the benefit of the entire city and not with a view of personal profit to the candidate or his friends, nor for the sake of building a political machine.

He defeated Holcombe and took office on January 2, 1929.

Under his watch, in February 1930, the USS Cincinnati came into port in the Houston Ship Channel. This was an opportunity for the city to demonstrate that the port could handle large ships of the size of the Cincinnati.

Holcombe challenged Monteith in the next election, but Monteith prevailed. Holcombe again ran against Monteith in 1932, this time successfully.

=== Law practice ===
After his two terms as mayor, Monteith established a law practice with Lewis W. Cutrer, who was an assistant city attorney during Monteith's terms as mayor. They maintained the law firm until 1939, when Monteith again took the bench.

Monteith served as president of the Houston Bar Association in 1938.

=== Chief Justice - 1st Court of Civil Appeals (1939-1953) ===
In 1938, Monteith was elected to the position of Chief Justice of the First Court of Civil Appeals, taking over the seat vacated by Judge R. A. Pleasants. He held the Chief Justice position from 1939 until his death in 1953.

== Monteith Ranch ==
In 1905, Walter Monteith's father, Arthur Monteith, purchased 300 acres of land in Bell County for cattle ranching. Over his lifetime, Arthur added another 700 acres, bringing the total to 1,000 acres. After his parents' passing, Walter Monteith inherited the ranch and later purchased an additional 1,330 acres, bringing the ranch’s total acreage to 2,330.

After Walter's death, the ranch stayed in the Monteith family. Over time, the family continued to expand the ranch, which now spans more than 3,500 acres. The ranch is still used for cattle ranching, as well as deer and bird hunting. Known as "Monteith Ranch," it remains one of the oldest and largest family-owned ranches in Texas.
