= Oscar F. Holcombe =

American politician

Oscar Holcombe
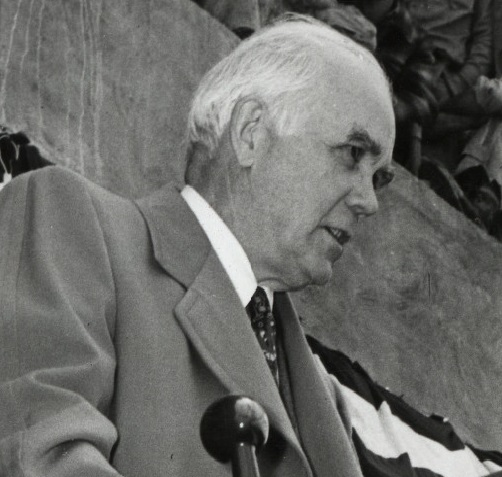

43rd, 45th, 47th, 50th & 52nd Mayor of Houston
- In office January 2, 1956 – January 2, 1958
- Preceded by: Roy Hofheinz
- Succeeded by: Lewis Cutrer
- In office January 2, 1947 – January 2, 1953
- Preceded by: Otis Massey
- Succeeded by: Roy Hofheinz
- In office January 2, 1939 – January 2, 1941
- Preceded by: Richard H. Fonville
- Succeeded by: Neal Pickett
- In office January 2, 1933 – January 2, 1937
- Preceded by: Walter E. Monteith
- Succeeded by: Richard H. Fonville
- In office January 2, 1921 – January 2, 1929
- Preceded by: A. Earl Amerman
- Succeeded by: Walter E. Monteith

Personal details
- Born: Oscar Fitzallen Holcombe; December 31, 1888 Mobile, Alabama, U.S.
- Died: June 18, 1968 (aged 79) Houston, Texas, U.S.
- Resting place: Forest Park Lawndale Cemetery; Houston, Texas
- Party: Democratic
- Spouse: Mary Grey Miller (m. 1912)
- Children: 1
- Profession: Businessman

Oscar Fitzallen Holcombe (December 31, 1888 – June 18, 1968) was an American businessman who served as the mayor of Houston, Texas, for 22 years, in 11 non-consecutive terms.

== Biography ==
Holcombe was born in Mobile, Alabama, and raised in San Antonio, Texas. He moved to Houston when he was 18, and founded his own construction business, the O. F. Holcombe Company, at age 26. His business acumen and contacts eventually made Holcombe a millionaire.

Six years after founding his business, in 1921, Holcombe won his first term as mayor. He served as mayor from 1921 to 1929. Holcombe was defeated in the 1929 election by Walter Monteith, who supported a more fiscally conservative approach. Holcombe ran for mayor again in 1931, promising to do more for the unemployed, but Monteith was elected again.

Holcombe served subsequent mayoral terms from 1933 to 1937, 1939 to 1941, 1947 to 1953, and 1956 to 1958. His administrations were considered to be conservative and pro-business, though Holcombe was also aggressive about expanding the city's boundaries and improving public services (such as libraries, a municipal auditorium, and an improved sewage system).

Holcombe married Mary Grey Miller on May 3, 1912. They had one daughter, Elisabeth, who married Henry Markley Crosswell, Jr.

== Honors ==
During the early 1960s, Houston renamed the stretch of Bellaire Boulevard east of Southside Place, which runs through the Texas Medical Center, as Holcombe Boulevard. In the late 1980s, the municipality of West University Place also renamed Bellaire Boulevard as Holcombe Boulevard within its jurisdiction.

Political offices
Preceded by A. Earl Amerman	Mayor of Houston, Texas; 1921–1929	Succeeded by Walter E. Monteith
Preceded by Walter E. Monteith	Mayor of Houston, Texas; 1933–1937	Succeeded by Richard H. Fonville
Preceded by Richard H. Fonville	Mayor of Houston, Texas; 1939–1941	Succeeded by Neal Pickett
Preceded by Otis Massey	Mayor of Houston, Texas; 1947–1953	Succeeded by Roy Hofheinz
Preceded by Roy Hofheinz	Mayor of Houston, Texas; 1956–1958	Succeeded by Lewis Cutrer
