= Roy Hofheinz Jr. =

American historian

- Born: Roy Mark Hofheinz Jr. December 18, 1935; Houston, Texas, U.S.
- Died: November 3, 2023 (aged 87); Rancho Mirage, California, U.S.
- Occupation: Professor
- Spouse: Susan Hart (m. 1981)
- Father: Roy Hofheinz
- Relatives: Fred Hofheinz (brother)
- Awards: Rhodes Scholarship

Academic background
- Education: Rice University (BA); Harvard University (PhD)

Academic work
- Discipline: Government, sinology
- Institutions: Harvard University
- Main interests: Chinese Communist Revolution

Roy Mark Hofheinz Jr. (December 18, 1935 – November 3, 2023) was an American sinologist who was a Professor of Government at Harvard University, heading the Fairbank Center from 1975 to 1979. He is best known for his work on the Chinese Communist Revolution.

== Personal life ==
Hofheinz was born in Houston, Texas. He is the son of Texas politician and developer Roy Hofheinz. He earned a BA at Rice University, and was a Rhodes Scholar. He was awarded a PhD at Harvard in 1967.

== Academic career ==
From 1975 to 1979, Hofheinz served as director of the Fairbank Center for East Asian Research.

== Selected works ==
In a statistical overview derived from writings by and about Roy Hofheinz Jr, OCLC/WorldCat encompasses roughly 10+ works in 30 publications in 4 languages and 1,000+ library holdings .

- Rural Administration in Communist China (1962)
- Chinese Communist Politics in Action (1969)
- China County Development: a Preliminary Atlas (1972)
- The Origins of Chinese Communist Concept of Rural Revolution (1974)
- A Catalog of Kuang-tung Land Records in the Taiwan Branch of the National Central Library (1975)
- The Broken Wave: the Chinese Communist Peasant Movement, 1922-1928 (1977)
- The Eastasia Edge (1982)
