= Lance Lalor =

American politician

Member of the Texas House of Representatives from the 80th district
- In office April 9, 1976 – January 2, 1980
- Preceded by: Joseph F. Pentony
- Succeeded by: Dan Downey

Personal details
- Party: Democratic

Lance Lalor is an American politician who served in the Texas House of Representatives from the 80th district from 1976 to 1980.
