= Cornelius A. Pickett =

American politician

Neal Pickett

48th Mayor of Houston
- In office 1941–1943
- Preceded by: Oscar F. Holcombe
- Succeeded by: Otis Massey

Personal details
- Born: Cornelius Augustus Pickett; December 22, 1902; Houston, Texas, U.S.
- Died: March 22, 1990 (aged 87); Houston, Texas, U.S.

Cornelius Augustus Pickett (December 22, 1902 – March 22, 1990), commonly known as Neal Pickett, was a politician and former mayor of Houston, Texas, USA, from 1941 to 1943.

== Personal life ==
He was born to Cornelius D. Pickett and Margaret Moody Pickett in Houston. Pickett married Margaret Yarborough on April 18, 1927, with whom he had three children, Margaret Ann, Patricia Jane and Neal Yarborough Pickett.

== Career ==
In 1916, he organized a troop of Boy Scouts in Brazoria, Texas, and served as patrol leader. From 1927 to 1930, Pickett was manager of the Chamber of Commerce of Mount Pleasant, Texas. He was secretary-manager of Houston Insurance Exchange from 1930 to 1935. He was executive vice president of the Lumberman's Association of Texas from 1935 to 1941. He was the mayor of Houston from January 1941 to January 1943. From 1943 to 1946, he worked for military welfare at the American Red Cross. He was vice president of Realty Mortgage Corporation from 1946 to 1961, director of the Federal Housing Administration from 1961 to 1967, and the first executive director of the Deep East Texas Development Council from 1967 to 1972. He was also involved in such organizations as the Houston Area Federal Business Association, the Hodgkin's Disease Memorial Research Center and the Texas and Harris County Young Democrats.

Political offices
Preceded by Oscar F. Holcombe	Mayor of Houston, Texas; 1941–1943	Succeeded by Otis Massey
