= Louie Welch =

American politician (1918–2008)

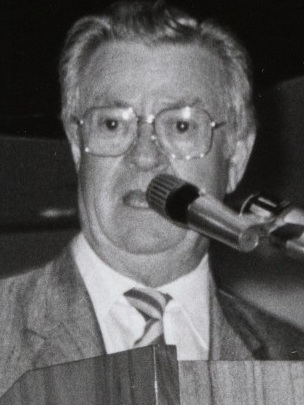
- Welch speaking, c. 1960's

54th Mayor of Houston
- In office January 2, 1964 – January 2, 1974
- Preceded by: Lewis Wesley Cutrer
- Succeeded by: Fred Hofheinz

30th President of the United States Conference of Mayors
- In office 1972–1973
- Preceded by: Henry Maier
- Succeeded by: Roy Martin

Personal details
- Born: December 9, 1918 Lockney, Texas, U.S.
- Died: January 27, 2008 (aged 89) Houston, Texas, U.S.
- Resting place: Brookside Memorial Park in Houston
- Party: Republican
- Spouse(s): Iola Faye Cure Welch (m. 1940; died 1991) Helen Welch
- Children: 6
- Education: Abilene Christian University (BA)
- Occupation: Businessman

Louie William Welch (December 9, 1918 – January 27, 2008) was an American politician who served from 1964 to 1974 as the mayor of Houston, Texas.

== Early life ==
Welch was born on December 9, 1918, in Lockney in Floyd County in West Texas. His father, Gilford Edgar Welch, was an automobile mechanic. His mother, the former Nora Shackleford, taught a Bible study at the Church of Christ which the family attended.

He was a member of his high school debate team and was the president of his senior class. Devoted to literature and poetry, he learned the passages that he quoted throughout his life. Memorizing these classic lines may also have contributed to his quick wit and brash one-liners. During his political career, Welch was known for his quick quips he used with the media. Sometimes this 'saltiness' got the diminutive man in trouble; more often than not it served its purpose: defusing the situation while making his point clear: he would stand up for what he believed was right. He studied in Abilene, Texas, at Abilene Christian College, now Abilene Christian University, where he was a varsity cheerleader and a member of Phi Delta Psi social club. In 1940, he received his Bachelor of Arts in history. He was married on December 17, 1940, to his first wife, Iola Faye Cure, in a ceremony performed by Homer Hailey.

== City Council ==
At the coaxing of fellow Lions International members, Welch was elected to the Houston City Council and served four two-year terms from 1950 to 1952 and then 1956 to 1962.

== Mayor ==
After losing three times in bids for mayor, he was elected in 1963. He served for five consecutive two-year terms (Kathy Whitmire was the only other mayor to do so).

Houston grew immensely when Welch was mayor. In 1963, Houston's population reached over one million people, yet was then still considered a "small" city in the eyes of the national media. Under Welch, several events put Houston prominently on the U.S. and world maps, including the opening of the Astrodome in 1965 and the Houston Intercontinental Airport in 1969. NASA at nearby Mission Control sent a man to the moon. Lake Conroe and Lake Livingston opened to provide water for Houston. Welch also closed forty inefficient sewage treatment plants, began cleaning up the Houston Ship Channel, focused on bayou beautification; and began development of the downtown Civic Center, among other accomplishments. Welch was the first Houston mayor to win all precincts during one of his reelections, including predominantly African American areas with which some claim he had trouble.

By the time that Welch left office in 1974, Houston was within two years of supplanting Detroit to become the fifth largest city in the United States in 1975, and in the fall of 1980, the fourth.

== Controversy ==
Welch was mayor in 1967 during two days of siege by Houston police at the predominantly black Texas Southern University, when a police officer was accidentally killed by another police officer. Multiple students were taken into custody. The events created a rift between the administration and many of Houston's African Americans. In 1968, Welch's last term was marred by controversy, being that his second mayoral bid was financed by questionable sources. It was rumored that his campaign was associated with organized crime with a handful of his cabinet coming under suspicion and indicted as a result of this link. Welch's reputation came under fire because of his friendships with well known crime leaders.

In early 1985, Welch was a leader in the opposition to the extension of job protection rights to homosexuals employed by the city government. Welch came back that year to run against incumbent Mayor Kathy Whitmire, who had served since 1982, in the Houston Mayoral Elections. Some of his comments (namely his candid quote caught by a microphone on live television, suggesting that one way to curb the spread of HIV would be to "shoot the queers") upset the city's gay community. The Houston GLBT Political Caucus supported Whitmire, his opponent in the race. She went on to defeat him in that race, remaining the city's mayor until the early 1990s.

== Organizations ==
Welch served as President of the U.S. Conference of Mayors in 1972–73 and as Vice President of the National League of Cities from 1970 until 1973. In 1973, Louie Welch decided not to run again. In 1974, he became President of the Houston Chamber of Commerce (now known as the Greater Houston Partnership). His company was Louie Welch & Associates.

== Death ==
Welch died at the age of 89 from lung cancer on January 27, 2008, in his north Harris County residence. He was survived by his wife, Helen, five children, and seventeen grandchildren, four stepchildren and four step-grandchildren. His first wife, Iola Faye Cure, died in 1991.

== Legacy ==
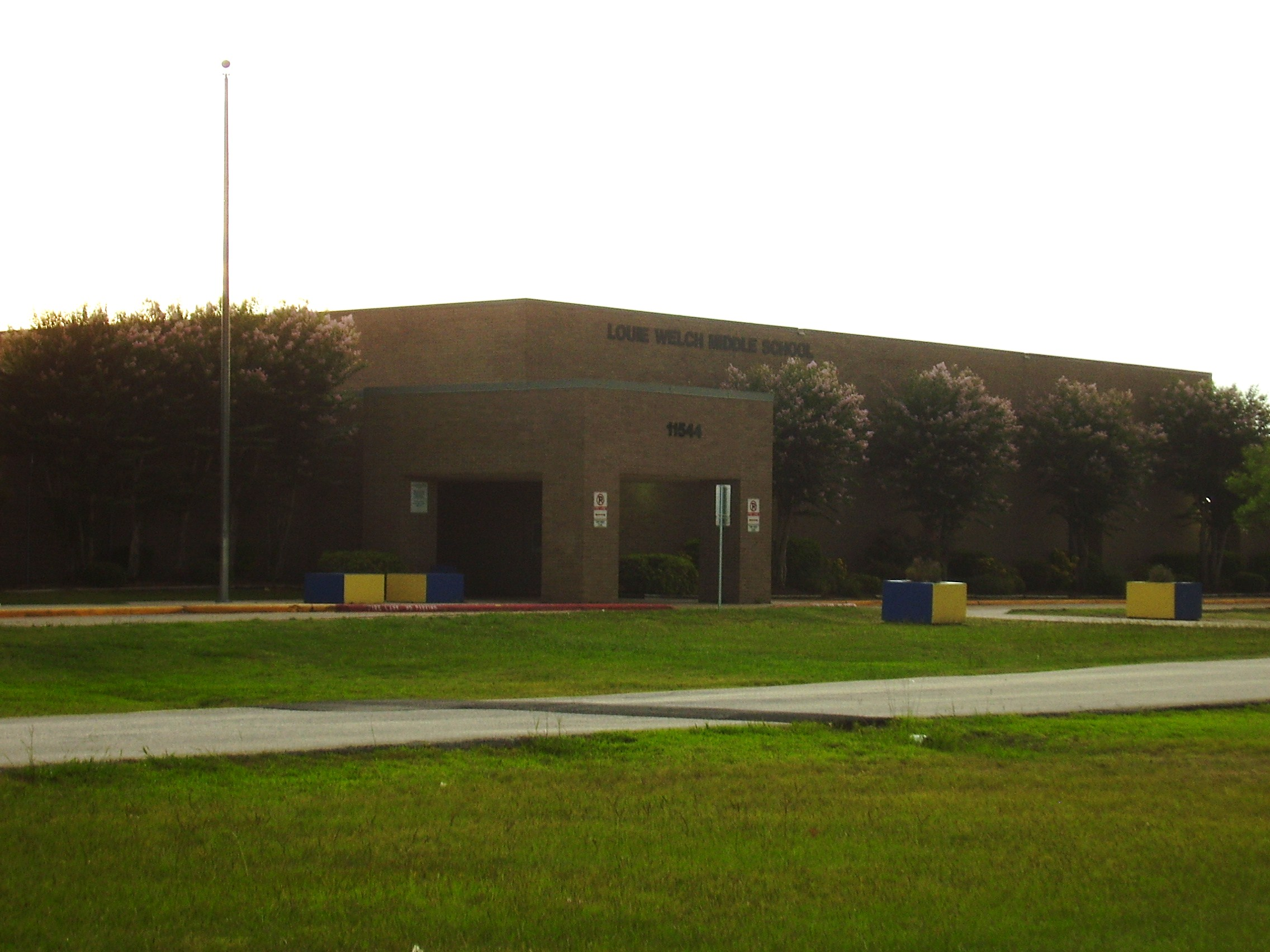
Louie Welch Middle School

Louie Welch Middle School in Fondren Southwest, Southwest Houston is named after him.

Political offices
Preceded by Lewis Cutrer	Mayor of Houston, Texas; 1964–1974	Succeeded by Fred Hofheinz
