= Fred Hofheinz =

American politician (born 1938)

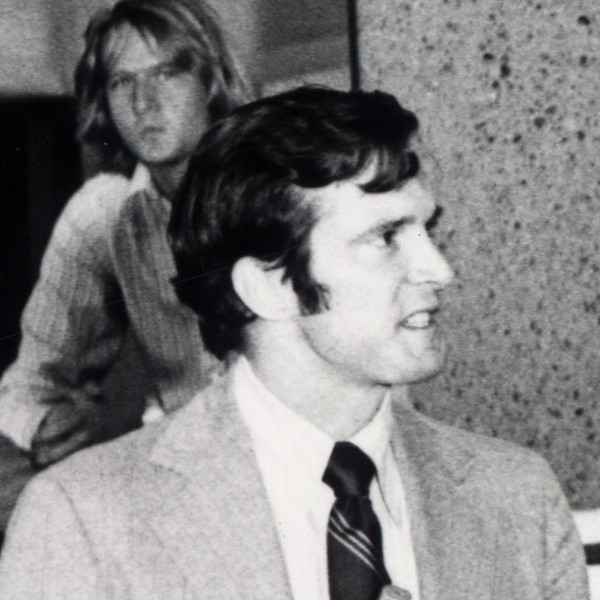
- Fred Hofheinz campaigning at the University of Houston, 1973

55th Mayor of Houston
- In office January 2, 1974 – January 2, 1978
- Preceded by: Louie Welch
- Succeeded by: Jim McConn

Personal details
- Born: March 15, 1938 (age 88) Houston, Texas, U.S.
- Party: Democratic
- Spouse: Linda Hickerson
- Children: 2
- Parent: Roy Hofheinz (father)
- Relatives: Roy Hofheinz Jr. (brother); Susan Hart (sister-in-law)
- Education: University of Texas (BA, MA, PhD); University of Houston (JD)
- Profession: Attorney

James Fred Hofheinz (born March 15, 1938) is an American lawyer and politician who served as the 55th mayor of Houston, Texas, from 1974 to 1978.

Hofheinz's father, Roy, was mayor of the city in the 1950s.

== Early life ==
Hofheinz graduated from Lamar High School in Houston, where he was a championship debater and also lettered in track and field. He attended the University of Texas, earning a Bachelor of Arts summa cum laude in 1960 and continued at Texas to earn both Master of Arts and Doctor of Philosophy degrees in economics. While an undergraduate at Texas, he joined Delta Kappa Epsilon Fraternity. Hofheinz earned a Juris Doctor from the University of Houston in 1964.

== Career ==
Hofheinz was elected in 1973 as mayor by 3,000 votes, with one of his pledges being to fire police chief Herman Short, who had been chief of the city since 1964 and had a reputation as both a supporter of George Wallace and a racist. Short, perceiving Hofheinz as too liberal, resigned that year. Hofheinz replaced Short in January 1974 with Carroll Lynn. That same year, Hofheinz was named one of "200 Faces for the Future" byTime. However, Hofheinz accepted Lynn's resignation (replacing him with B. G. Bond) in 1975 after an investigation by Lynn found numerous department irregularities (such as illegal police wiretapping) that led to discord with rank-and-file officers and had opponents waiting to face Hofheinz to use it against him in the upcoming election, which Hofheinz won. Dogged by questions about police management (particularly in regards to perceived brutality in certain cases), Bond resigned in June 1977, weeks after the body of José Campos Torres was found floating in the Bayou after being beaten to death by officers, of which Bond had fired three involved and had two of them charged with murder (in the fall of that year, the officers on trial received probation). Hofheinz left office in 1978.

After his two terms as mayor, Hofheinz practiced law in Houston. He also served as a board member at Lucas Energy, an independent crude oil and gas company. In 1971, Hofheinz co-founded the closed circuit television company Top Rank. Hofheinz ran again for mayor in 1989 against incumbent mayor Kathy Whitmire (running for her fifth two-year term after having already beaten a former mayor in Louie Welch four years prior). Hofheinz had a lead in the polls at one point but Whitmire on election day won with 60% of the vote.

In 1994, Hofheinz was the sole shareholder of Top Rank when it attempted to purchase the Minnesota Timberwolves and move them to New Orleans, which had the combined efforts of Louisiana politicians and boxing promoter Bob Arum of Top Rank in their attempt to buy the team. The deal fell through when NBA owners voted unanimously to reject the sale, citing concerns about the firmness of Top Rank's finances. In 1999, he was indicted in the state of Louisiana as part of the investigation of former governor Edwin Edwards. Hofheinz was one of three businessmen (one a longtime associate of Edwards) indicted on charges of bribery, with Hofheinz delivering bribes to Cecil Brown (a longtime associate of Edwards) meant to advance projects (as overseen by Hofheinz) such as building a juvenile prison and the effort to move the Timberwolves to New Orleans. On November 21, 2000, Hofheinz reached a plea agreement with federal prosecutors that saw him plead guilty in failing to report a felony and testify against Collins in exchange for all other charges being dropped; he was issued a fine of $5,000 and sentenced to one year of probation.

Hofheinz currently resides in Houston. Formerly, he had served as an attorney in the law firm of Williams, Birnberg & Andersen L.L.P.

Political offices
Preceded by Louis Welch	Mayor of Houston, Texas; 1974–1978	Succeeded by Jim McConn
