= Otis Massey =

American politician

Otis Massey (May 26, 1891 – September 1968) was mayor of Houston, Texas from January 1943 to 1947.

== Early life ==
Otis Massey was born on May 26, 1891 in Drexel, Missouri.

== Career ==
Massey was the first mayor of Houston to serve under the city manager form, rather than the city commission form of government. As mayor, he supported a proposal to sell 133 1/2 acres of land to the M.D. Anderson Foundation in December 1943. This land would be developed into hospitals in the Houston Medical District. He proclaimed May 22, 1946 to be National Maritime Day in Houston.

== Personal life ==
Massey was married to Mayme Kiser, they had two daughters, Dorothy and Marion.

Political offices
Preceded by Neal Pickett	Mayor of Houston, Texas; 1943–1947	Succeeded by Oscar F. Holcombe
