= Barrio =

Neighborhood or district in Spain and the rest of the Hispanic world

Barrio (Spanish pronunciation: [ˈbarjo]; lit. 'quarter, neighborhood') is generally defined as each area of a city delimited by functional (e.g., residential, commercial, industrial, etc.), social, architectural or morphological features. In Spain, in most of Hispanic America, and in the Philippines, the term may also be used to officially denote a division of a municipality. The word barrio is an Arabism, as it is derived from the Arabic word barriyy (بري; 'wild, exterior').

== Usage ==
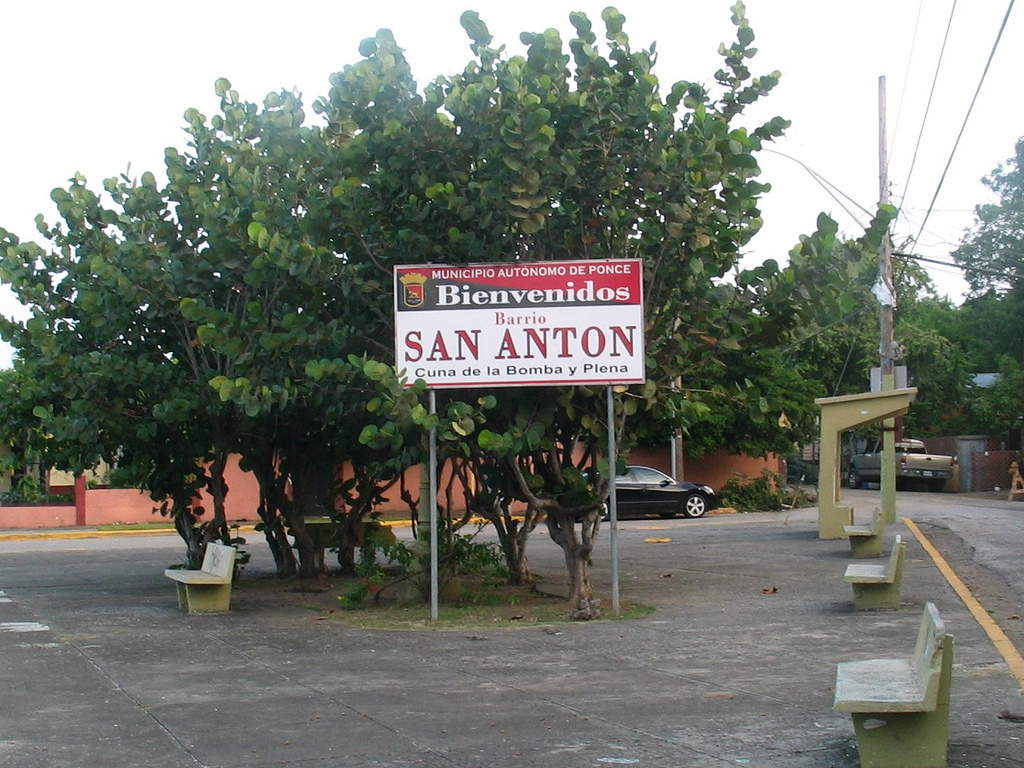
Sign marking the entrance to Barrio San Antón, one of Ponce's official barrios in Puerto Rico

In Argentina and Uruguay, a barrio is a division of a municipality officially delineated by the local authority at a later time, and it sometimes keeps a distinct character from other areas (as in the barrios of Buenos Aires, even if they have been superseded by larger administrative divisions). The word does not have a special socioeconomic connotation unless it is used in contrast to the centro (city center or downtown). The expression barrio cerrado (translated "closed neighborhood") is used to describe small upper-class residential settlements planned with an exclusive criterion and often physically enclosed in walls, that is, a kind of gated community.

In Colombia, the term is used to describe any urban area neighborhood whose geographical limits are determined locally. The term can be used to refer to all classes within society. The term barrio de invasión or comuna is more often used to refer to shanty towns, but the term "barrio" has a more general use.

In Cuba, El Salvador and Spain, the term barrio is used officially to denote a subdivision of a municipio (or municipality); each barrio is subdivided into sectors (sectores).

In the Philippines, the term barrio may refer to a rural village, but it may also denote a self-governing community subdivision within a rural or urban area anywhere in the country. A 1974 decree replaced the word barrio with barangay, the basic administrative unit of government, possessing an average population of 2,500 people. (Note: By virtue of Presidential Decree No. 557, s. 1974) Barrio, however, is still widely used interchangeably with barangay. Both may refer to rural settlements or urban municipal districts (the latter formerly known as visitas). It is alternatively spelled as baryo, though the preferred spelling is the Spanish one (barrio).

In the U.S. territory of Puerto Rico, the term barrio is an official government designation used to denote a subdivision of a municipio and denotes the government's lowest level and geographically smallest officially recognized administrative unit. A barrio in Puerto Rico is not vested with political authority. It may or may not be further subdivided into sectors, communities, urbanizaciones, or a combination of these, but such further subdivisions, though popular and common, are unofficial.

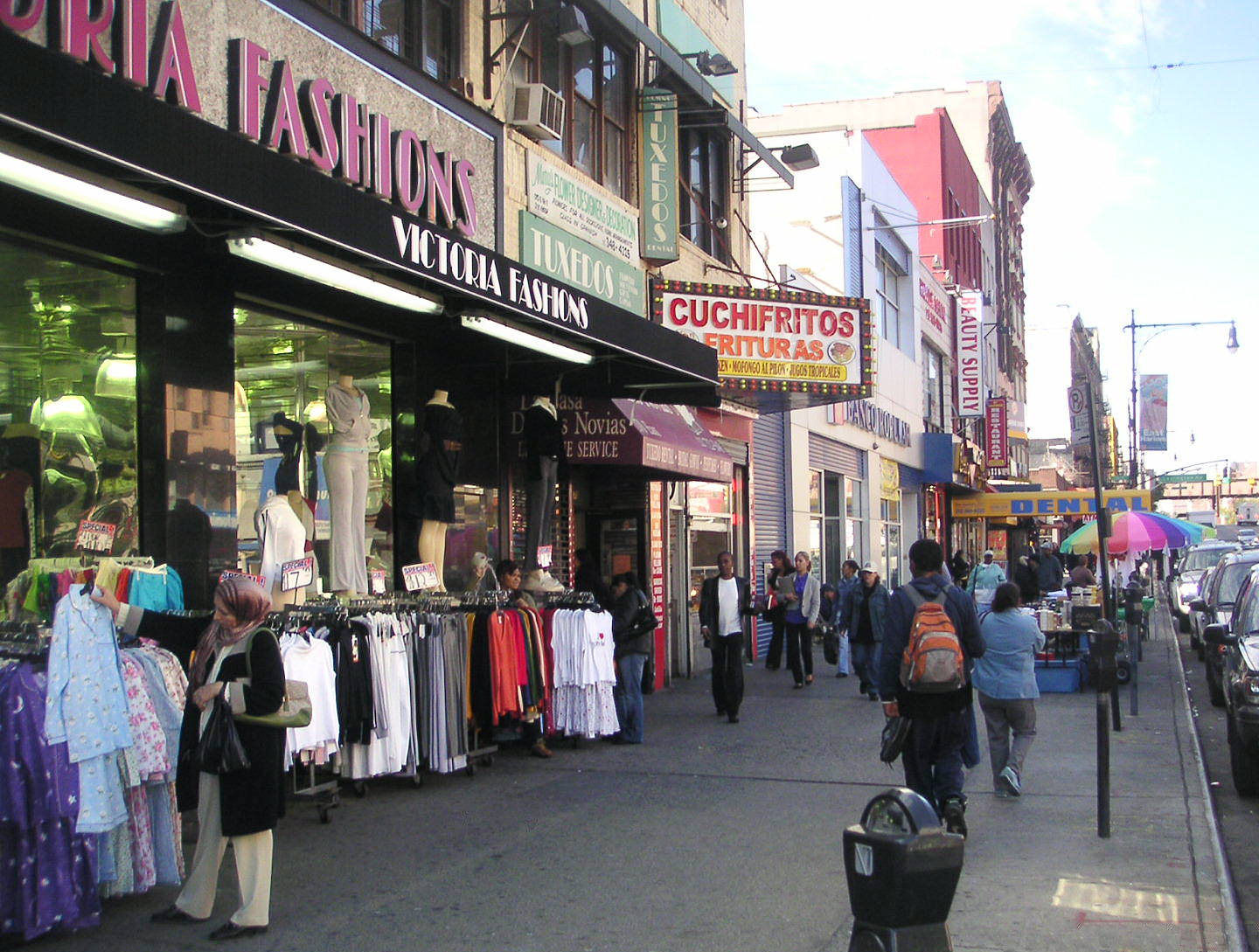
Spanish signs advertising "La Casa de las Novias", "Cuchifritos" and Banco Popular are visible in a row of stores in this photo of El Barrio at Lexington and 116th in Manhattan, New York, U.S.

In the mainland United States, the term barrio is used to refer to inner-city areas overwhelmingly inhabited by first-generation Spanish-speaking immigrant families who have not been assimilated into the mainstream American culture. Some examples of this include Spanish Harlem in New York City, East L.A. in Los Angeles; and Segundo Barrio in Houston. Some of these neighborhoods are simply referred to as just "El Barrio" by the locals, as opposed to using their actual names (Spanish Harlem, East L.A., Segundo Barrio, etc.).

In Venezuela and the Dominican Republic, the term is commonly used to describe slums in the outer rims of big cities such as Caracas and Santo Domingo as well as lower- and middle-class neighborhoods in other cities and towns.

== History ==
Over the centuries, the colonial Hispanic American cities evolved as a mosaic of the various barrios, surrounding the central administrative areas. As they matured, the barrios functionally and symbolically reproduced the city and in some way tended to replicate it. The barrio reproduced the city through providing occupational, social, physical and spiritual space. With the emergence of an enlarged merchant class, some barrios were able to support a wide range of economic levels. This led to new patterns of social class distribution throughout the city. Those who could afford to locate in and around the central plazas relocated. The poor and marginal groups still occupied the spaces at the city's edge.

The desire on the part of the sector popular to replicate a barrio was expressed through the diversity of the populace and functions and the tendency to form social hierarchies and to maintain social control. The limits to replication were mainly social. Any particular barrio could not easily expand its borders into other barrios, nor could it easily export its particular social identity to others. Different barrios provided different products and services to the city, e.g., one might make shoes, while another made cheese. Integration of daily life could also be seen in the religious sector, where a parish and a convento might serve one or more neighborhoods.

The mosaic formed by the barrios and the colonial center continued until the period of independence in Mexico and Latin America. The general urban pattern was one where the old central plaza was surrounded by an intermediate ring of barrios and emerging suburban areas linking the city to the hinterland. The general governance of the city was in the hands of a mayor and city councilors. Public posts were purchased and funds given to the local government and the royal bureaucracy. Fairness and equity were not high on the list of public interests. Lands located on the periphery were given to individuals by local authorities, even if this land was designated for collective uses, such as farming or grazing. This practice of peripheral land expansion laid the groundwork for later suburbanization by immigrants from outside the region and by real estate agents.

At the edge of Hispanic American colonial cities there were places where work, trade, social interaction and symbolic spiritual life occurred. These barrios were created to meet the space needs of local craftsman and the shelter needs of the working class. At times they were designed to meet municipal norms, but they usually responded to functional requirements of the users. Barrios were built over centuries of sociocultural interaction within urban space. In Mexico and in other Latin American countries with strong heritages of colonial centers, the concept of barrio no longer contains the social, cultural and functional attributes of the past. The few surviving barrios do so with a loss of traditional meaning. For most of them the word has become a descriptive category or a generic definition.

== See also ==
- Colonia – neighborhood subdivisions in Mexican cities
- Colonia (United States)
- Barrios of Puerto Rico
- Barangay
- Bairro
- Bario

== Sources ==
- Siembieda, W. J.; López Moreno, E. (1998). "Barrios and the Hispanic American city: Cultural value and social representation". Journal of Urban Design. 3 (1): 39–52. doi:10.1080/13574809808724415.
- Karl Eschbach, Glenn V. Ostir, Kushang V. Patel, Kyriakos S. Markides, James S. Goodwin. "Neighborhood Context and Mortality Among Older Mexican Americans: Is There a Barrio Advantage?" American Journal of Public Health. October 2004. Volume 94. pp. 1807–1812.
