= Our Lady of Guadalupe School =

Our Lady of Guadalupe School can refer to:

- Our Lady of Guadalupe School (Houston)
- Our Lady of Guadalupe School (Laredo, Texas)
- Our Lady of Guadalupe School v. Morrissey-Berru, a U.S. Supreme Court case
