= Clayton Homes (Houston) =

Public housing development in Texas, United States

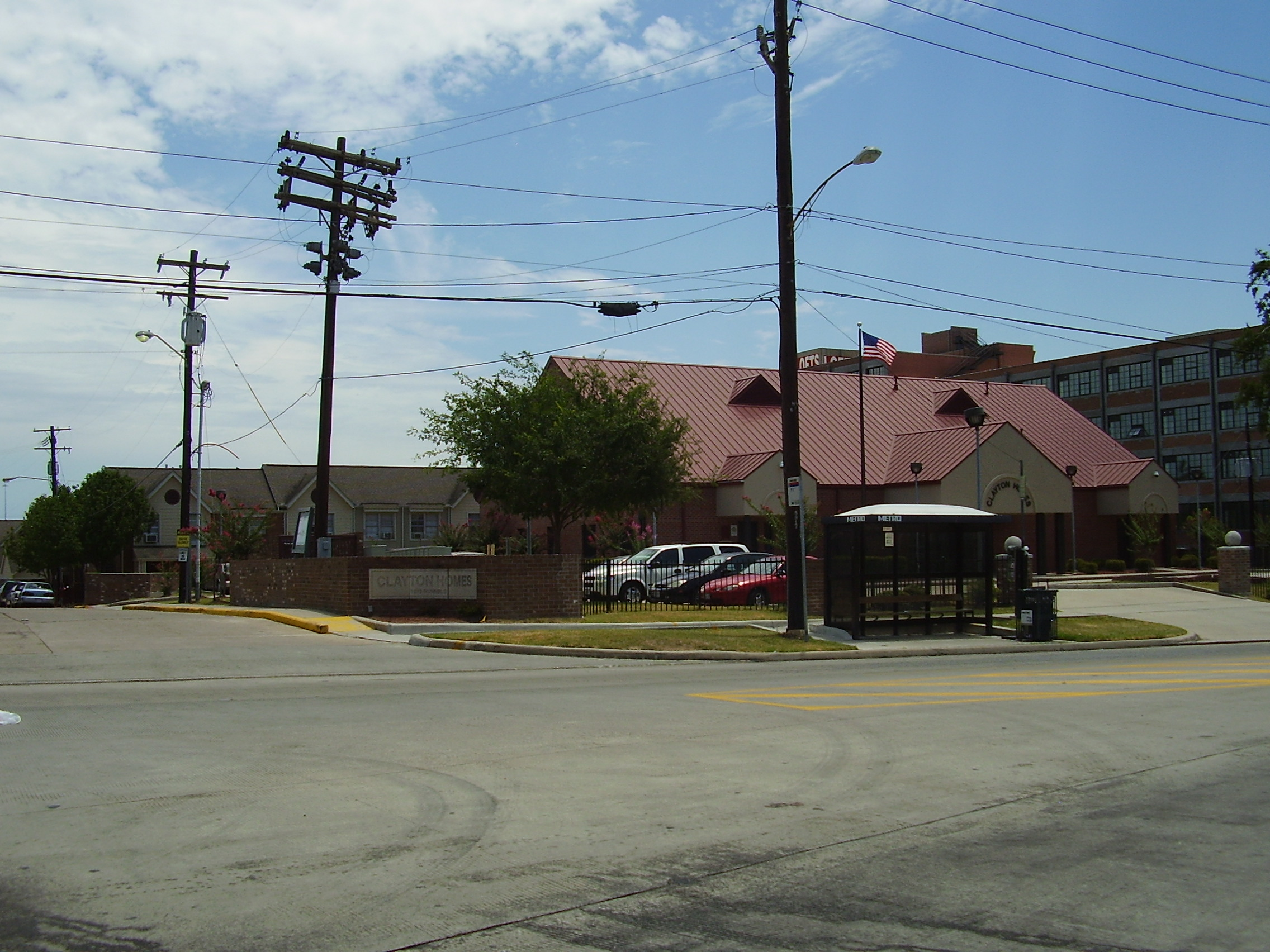
Clayton Homes

Susan V. Clayton Homes was a public housing unit in the Second Ward area of the East End district of Houston. Operated by the Houston Housing Authority (HHA), the development was located on Runnels Street along the Buffalo Bayou and east of Downtown Houston. It was adjacent to railroad tracks and warehouses. It had 296 units.

== History ==
Susan Vaughn Clayton donated property which houses Clayton Homes to the City of Houston, and it opened in 1952. Most of the new residents were Hispanic, had large families, and were of low income statuses. About 2,500 families of Mexican origin resided in Clayton Homes in the late 1950s. A Houston Chronicle article from the period stated that its location, away from major landmarks and with surrounding the bayou, railroad tracks, and warehouses inhibiting foot traffic, made some poor people reluctant to live there.

Neighborhood Centers Association of Houston and Harris County established the Clayton Homes Neighborhood Development Program in 1959 and began inquiring about getting grants for it in 1961.

It was renovated in 2007.

By 2010 Lola Santos-Cantu had organized a reunion for people who resided in Clayton Homes as children during the 1950s and 1960s.

Almost 40% of the units were flooded by Hurricane Harvey in 2017. Tenants reported that their landlord asked them for rent even though their rooms were flooded, but the HHA later refunded the rent. Of the HHA complexes affected by Harvey, Clayton received the most damage. The HHA deemed the flooded apartments, infested with mold and E. coli, a total loss and had them demolished; they will not be rebuilt as Interstate 45 will be expanded. As of July 2022, Clayton Homes has been permanently closed, with all residents being relocated to various locations within HHA, and demolition soon in preparation.

== Education ==
Residents are within the Houston Independent School District (HISD). Zoned schools include: Blanche Kelso Bruce Elementary School in the Fifth Ward, Navarro Middle School (formerly Stonewall Jackson Middle School) in Eastwood, and Wheatley High School in the Fifth Ward.

It is also in proximity to Baylor College of Medicine Biotech Academy at Rusk (a middle school, formerly Rusk K-8 School and Rusk Elementary School), which is near Settegast Park, at Garrow and Paige Streets. Beginning in the 2016–2017 school year the elementary zoned grades at Rusk were phased out. PreKindergarten through grade 2 at Rusk will be phased out immediately, with 3-5 being phased out in the following five years; elementary grades for Rusk will be phased out by fall 2019.

Clayton was, upon its 1952 opening, initially assigned to Rusk Elementary School. It was rezoned to Anson Jones Elementary School after Rusk was demolished so U.S. Route 59 (Eastex Freeway) could be built. HISD perceived Anson Jones's proximity to US59 to be a hazard, and Clayton Homes residents had difficulties with their commute due to traffic issues. HISD built a new Rusk Elementary, opening in 1960, with Clayton Homes being rezoned to that school.

By the mid-2000s Jones Elementary was again Clayton Homes's zoned school. As of the 2005–2006 school year, Jones had experienced a severe population decline. Of its student body, a little over 200 students, about two-thirds lived in Clayton Homes. The school closed after the end of that year. The property was rezoned to Bruce Elementary.

Clayton Homes was also, at one time, assigned to E. O. Smith Educational Center for middle school.

== Community ==
Our Lady of Guadalupe Catholic Church serves area residents.
