= Second Ward, Houston =

Political ward in Houston, Texas, US

Coordinates: 29.7520°N 95.3273°W

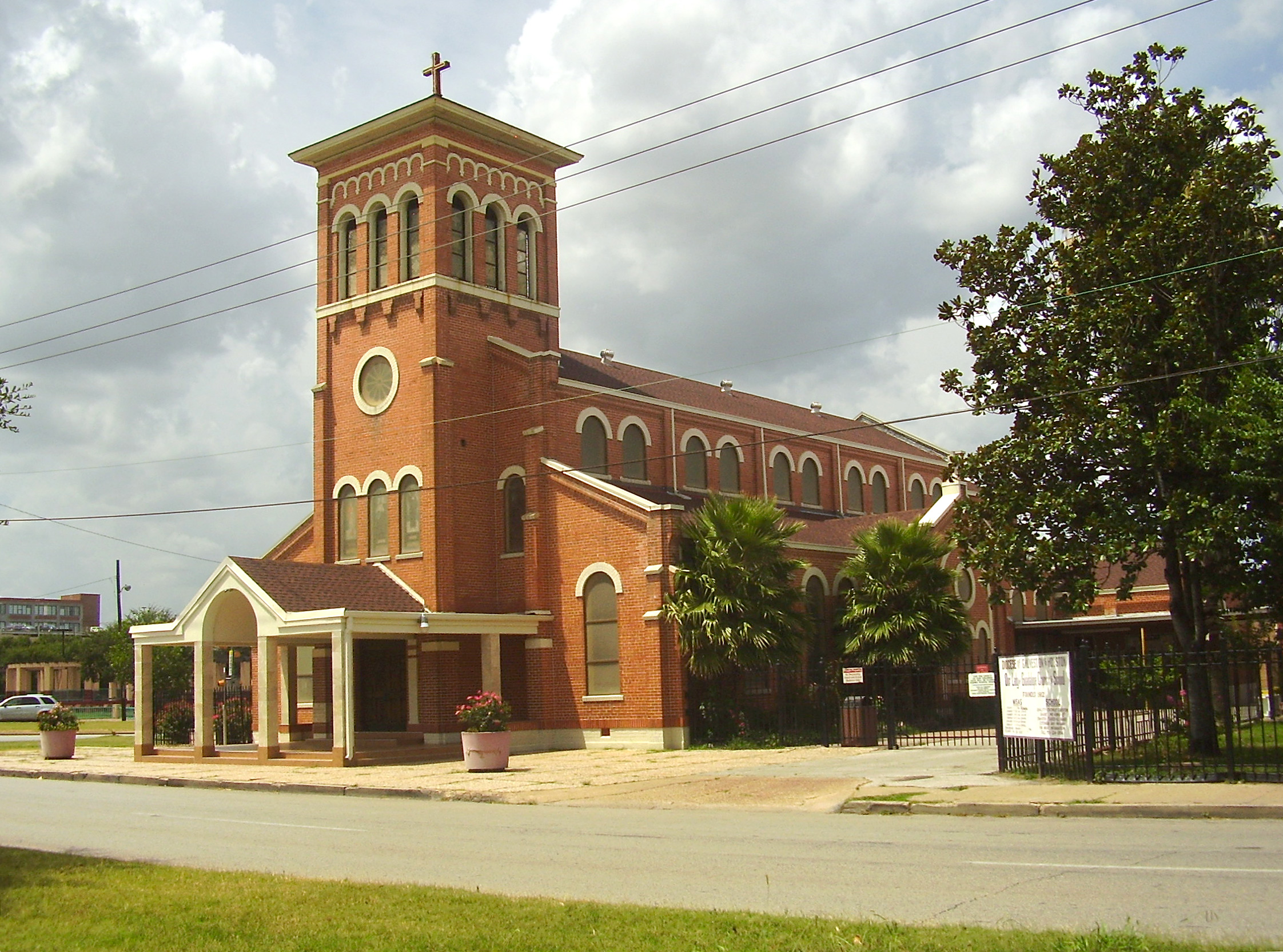
Our Lady of Guadalupe Catholic Church

Second Ward (also known as Segundo Barrio, Spanish for "second neighborhood", or Segundo in short; historically Das Zweiter in German) is a historical political district ward in the East End community in Houston, Texas. It was one of the four original wards of the city in the nineteenth century. The community known as the Second Ward today is roughly bounded by Buffalo Bayou to the north, Lockwood Avenue to the east, and railroad tracks to the south and west, although the city-designated Second Ward Super Neighborhood extends to train tracks east of Lockwood.

Second Ward, which initially had a significant German American population, transitioned to a Mexican American neighborhood during the twentieth century. Many buildings in the community were constructed in the 1920s and bear the art deco style. Beginning in the 1990s and continuing into the 21st century the neighborhood has become heavily gentrified, seeing infrastructure improvements, loft and office construction, a light rail line, and changing demographics. The formerly industrial northern and western segments of the ward are rapidly being redeveloped as residential and commercial properties. with property values increasing due to the area's proximity to Downtown, Daikin Park, and Shell Energy Stadium.

== History ==
Second Ward, in a 1913 map of Houston.

=== 19th Century ===
After incorporation of Houston in 1837, the Second Ward was established as one of the original four wards of Houston through charter statutes passed in 1839 and 1840. The boundaries of the Second Ward were Buffalo Bayou to the north, Main Street to the west, Congress Avenue to the south, and the city limits to the east. The Second Ward elected two aldermen to represent them in municipal government.

The Frost brothers, Samuel and Jonathan, started developing the first subdivision in Houston shortly after the Allen brothers acquired the Houston tract. Samuel ran a hamlet outside of town on his homestead, which included a blacksmith shop. Jonathan inherited the fifteen-acre tract after his brother died of cholera. Jonathan platted Frost-town as a small subdivision within a bend of Buffalo Bayou. The surviving Frost brother succeeded in selling seventy percent of the lots by 1840, about the time that Frost-town was incorporated within the city of Houston.

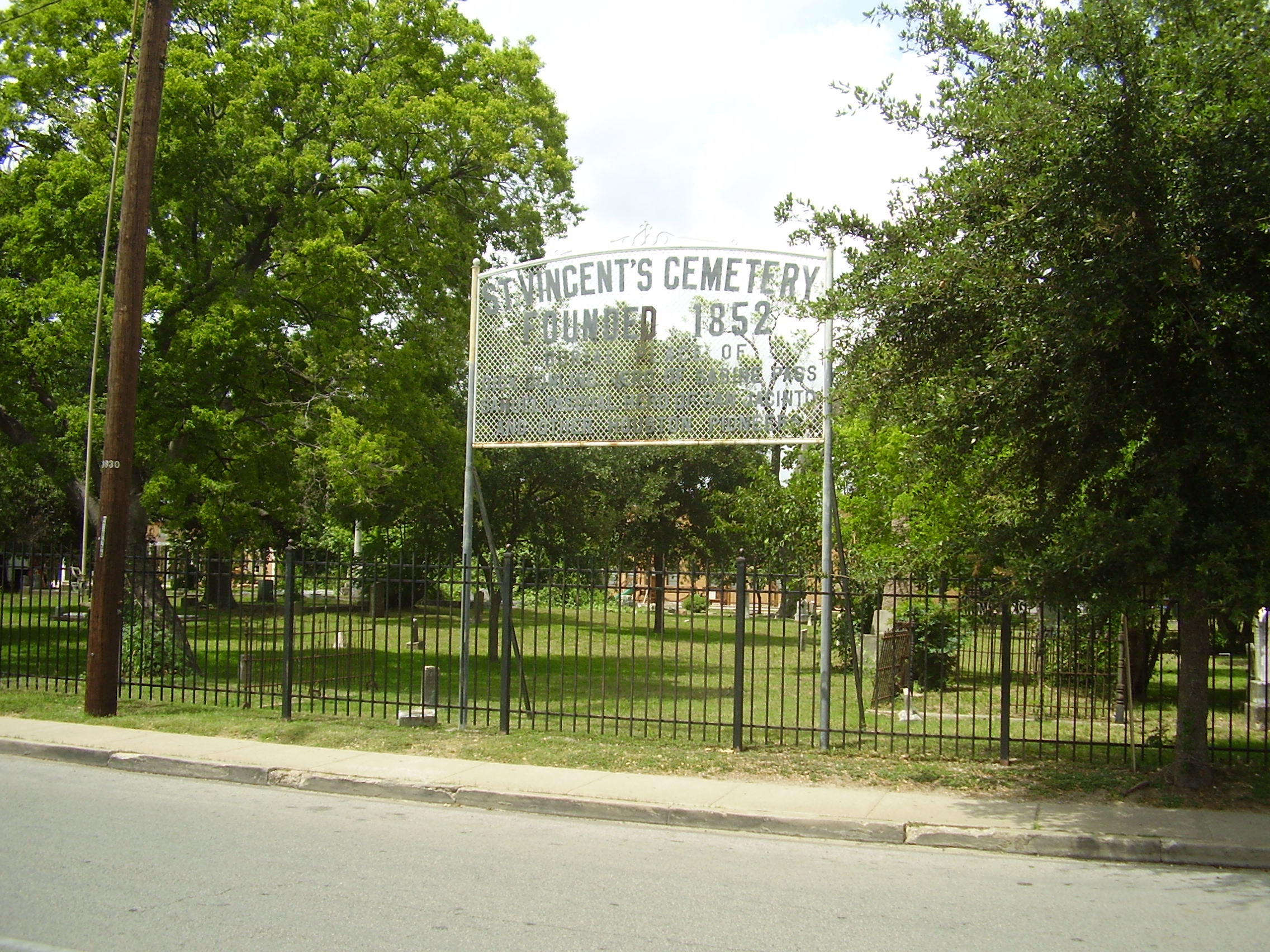
St. Vincent's Cemetery

The Second Ward contained an important meeting place for Houston's Catholics. John Odin arrived in Houston in 1841, when he established the first Catholic parish, St. Vincent de Paul. The next year, the parish opened its first church at the southwest corner of Franklin Avenue and Caroline Street. The complex included a rectory and a school.

By 1860, the Second Ward included some of the wealthiest people in Houston. William J. Hutchins and William Marsh Rice each reported wealth of at least $700,000 to the census taker in 1860. In addition to these wealthy residents who resided in town between Franklin and Congress avenues, Robert Lockhart and John T. Brady lived in remote neighborhoods, far east in the Second Ward. Lockhart was a merchant and grist mill owner who married into the Francis Lubbock family, and resided on a large homestead known as "Lubbock's Grove." Lockhart's personal estate in 1860 was comparatively modest compared but still substantial at $105,000. Brady, another wealthy Second Ward resident, was an attorney, state legislator, and investor.

By the late nineteenth century Second Ward had a heavily German American community. Thomas McWhorter, author of "From Das Zweiter to El Segundo, A Brief History of Houston’s Second Ward," wrote that "Second Ward became an unofficial hub of German-American culture and social life." The Houston Saengerbund was established in 1883 as a German-American singing group, one of many that proliferated in the German diaspora during that era. It bought the William Hamblen House in 1913. It was the final German American cultural organization to be established in the Second Ward. The Houston Saengerbund left the Second Ward in 1935. In the late 1800s Volksfest Park hosted the Volkfest festival, a German-American event. Its attendance prompted the Bayou Street Railway Company to, in 1889, add a mule car line to the park.

=== 20th Century ===
The German community and organizations were suppressed during World War I and its resulting anti-German sentiment. Even street names were affected; the Houston City Council discussed renaming German Street to Canal Street in 1917 and voted to make the new name official on June 3, 1918.

Second Ward, along with neighboring Denver Harbor, became one of the first Jewish-American barrios in America. It began taking in African immigrants in the early 1900s. At that time, three-fifths of the population there were Jewish, one-fifth African American, and one-fifth made up of a diversity of ethnicities, including Mexicans.

When Mexican-Americans began settling en masse in Houston, they first resided in the Second Ward. Jesus Jesse Esparza of Houston History magazine said that the Second Ward "quickly became the unofficial hub of their cultural and social life." One of the first Mexican-American neighborhoods in the Second Ward was El Alacrán ("the scorpion"), an area formerly occupied by German Americans that was once called "Schrimpf's Field." After the German Americans left, Mexican Americans moved into the houses, which were in poor condition. El Alacrán was erased by the construction of the Elysian Viaduct, public housing, and US Highway 59 in the 1950s.

By the 1920s, Mexicans became the majority in the neighborhood. Anglos, Jews, and blacks moved out of the Second Ward. A settlement house, a converted school for Mexican children, and two churches: Our Lady of Guadalupe Catholic Church and the Mexican Methodist Episcopal Church, opened. After World War II, Mexican-American settlement expanded southward into Eastwood and what is now called EaDo. Eastward expansion merged with Magnolia Park, and the neighborhoods began to be collectively called the East End.

The Houston Housing Authority operated the public housing facility Clayton Homes, at Runnels Street and US-59/Interstate 69, until its demolition for freeway expansion in 2024.

In 1973 Ninfa's Restaurant opened on Navigation Boulevard. The popularity of its fajita platter led to the dish being adopted by Tex-Mex restaurants across the United States.

In the 1980s public funding was used to develop El Mercado Del Sol, a massive retail space to serve the East End, accompanied by Guadalupe Plaza. The venture failed in 1986; the building is now used for loft apartments.

In 1992 former Mayor of Houston Bob Lanier proposed converting the 10.5-acre (42,000 m^{2}) former Milby Bus Barn site into a 59-family low income development which would have been called La Villa de las Flores (Spanish for "the Village of the Flowers"); the Metropolitan Transit Authority of Harris County, Texas used the site as a bus barn from 1976 to 1983. In 1993 workers doing preliminary jobs discovered unused storage tanks, prompting testing for dangerous chemicals. Soil tests revealed petroleum and lead; the lead was 300 times the amount of safe concentration for a homeowner. Local residents received testing. The city began a cleanup in June 1993, replacing 58,300 cubic yards of topsoil and installing "groundwater recovery systems" to remove water contaminated with motor fuel and chlorinated solvents. Fugro Environmental Inc. reported to the City of Houston that the cleanup put the site in compliance with Environmental Protection Agency standards. In Summer 1999 the Texas Natural Resources Conservation Commission reported that the former Milby Bus Barn site was safe. By August 1999 the site remained vacant.

=== 21st Century ===
In the 2000s the bus barn site was developed into a Houston City College campus and high school.

By 2006 many lofts and townhouses were constructed in the Second Ward; this was the first time in history that the Second Ward had townhouses. City Councilmember Felix Fraga noted a renewal of the ward's notability, remarking, "I think people moving in will say they're moving into the Second Ward" after a period of population decline.

In 2015 a group called the Carnalismo Brown Berets de Houston campaigned against gentrification of the Second Ward.

The ward was largely spared the catastrophic flooding of Hurricane Harvey in 2017; formerly low-lying areas along Buffalo Bayou were elevated with dredged material in the nineteenth century and the bayou is much wider than in western areas of the city.

In 2024 the complex intersection of Runnels Street, Navigation Boulevard, and Jensen Drive was rebuilt as a roundabout, one of very few ever constructed in Houston. On October 20, 2024, a tour helicopter collided with a 1000 foot (300 meter)-tall radio tower on Engelke Street, causing the deaths of all 4 aboard, the mast's collapse, and debris scattered throughout the neighborhood.

== Demographics ==
In 1860, there were 906 people in the Second Ward, with 482 born outside of the United States, making up 53% of the total, and the remainder born in the United States; those U.S.-born included people from immigrant families. 53% of the total population were people of German descent born outside of the United States. Other residents originated from Algeria, Austria, Belgium, Canada, Cuba, England, France, Hungary, Ireland, Italy, Mexico, Nassau, Poland, Switzerland, and Scotland.

As of the 1910 U.S. census, the Second Ward had 405 German nationals, 91 Russians, 79 Italians, 65 Austro-Hungarians, 62 English, 50 Mexicans, 28 Irish, 21 French, 13 Scottish, 12 Swiss, 12 Canadians, 11 Swedes, 10 Norwegians, 7 Greeks, and 7 Poles.

In the 2020s the Second Ward Super Neighborhood's population has hovered at 10-12,000 residents, or just under 6000 households.

== Government and infrastructure ==
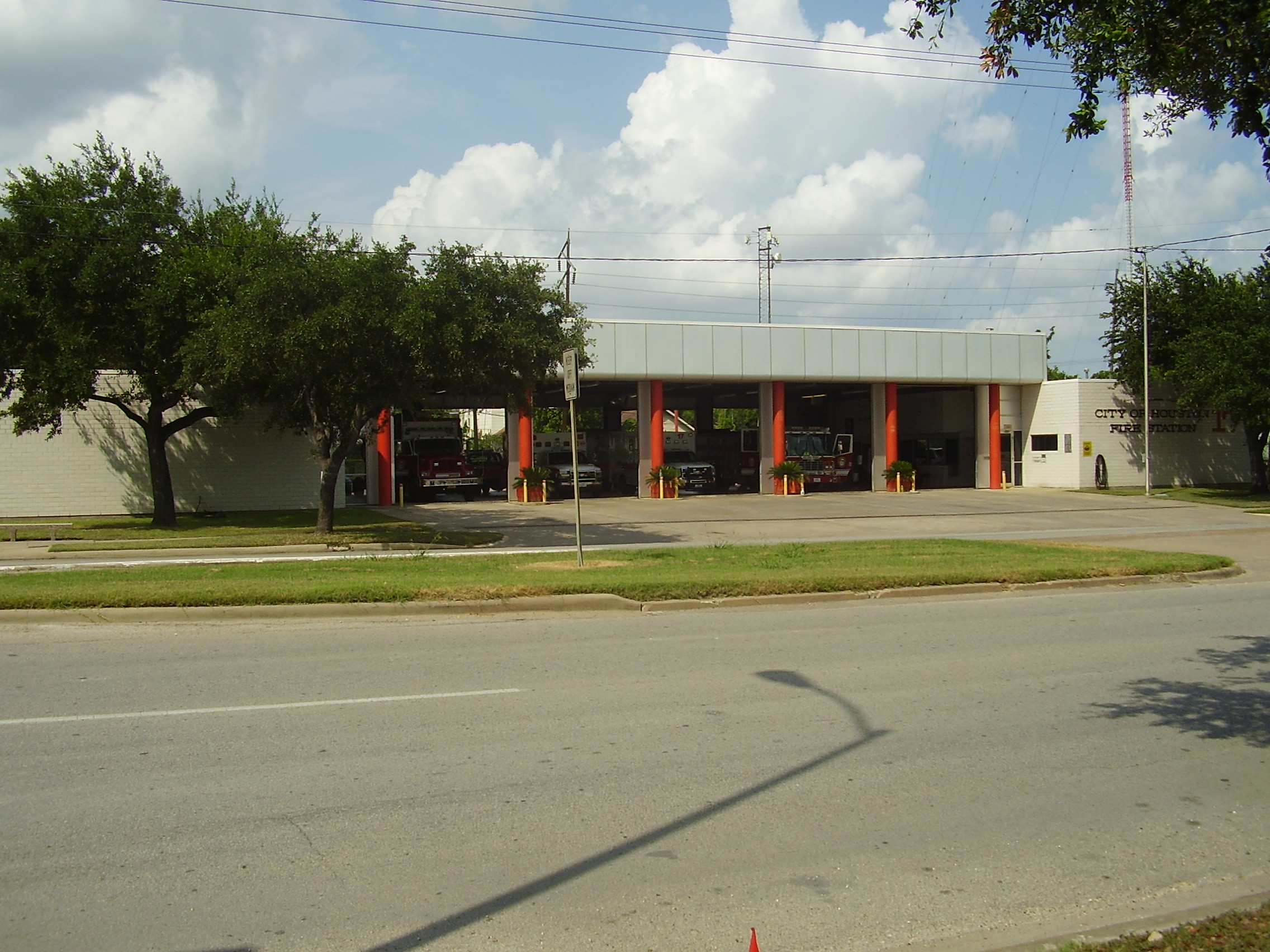
Fire Station 17

Second Ward is located in District H of the Houston City Council, represented by Mario Castillo. The Houston Fire Department Station 17 Second Ward, located in Fire District 8, serves the community. Firehouse 17 opened in the former Station 2 at Sampson at York in 1926. The station moved to its current location at Delano at Navigation in 1983.

The Houston Police Department's South Central Patrol Division serves the neighborhood.

Second Ward west of Milby Street is in the 18th Congressional District, currently represented by Democrat Christian Menefee. Areas east of Milby are in the 29th District, represented by Democrat Sylvia Garcia.

Harris Health System (formerly Harris County Hospital District) designated the Ripley Health Center in the East End for the ZIP code 77003. In 2000 Ripley was replaced by the Gulfgate Health Center. The designated public hospital is Ben Taub General Hospital in the Texas Medical Center.

== Education ==
=== Primary and secondary schools ===
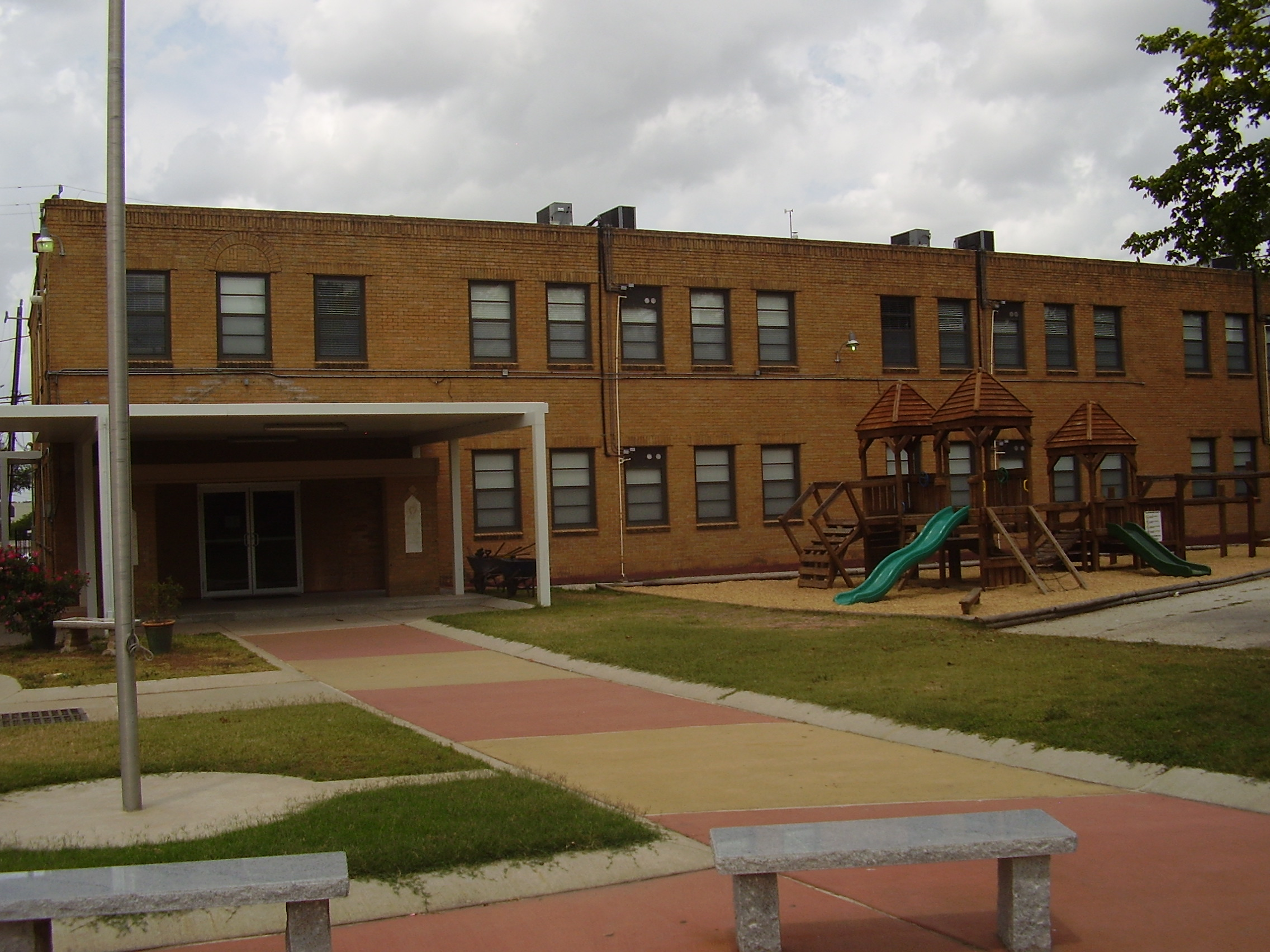
Our Lady of Guadalupe School classroom building

Area students attend public schools in the Houston Independent School District.

There are currently no public elementary schools remaining in Second Ward. Elementary students are zoned to Lantrip Elementary or Burnet Elementary, south and east of the ward, respectively.

Middle schoolers in the entire ward are zoned to Navarro Middle School (historically, Stonewall Jackson Junior High School), which is one mile (1.6 kilometers) southeast of the neighborhood. A magnet school, Baylor College of Medicine Biotech Academy at Rusk, is located on Garrow Street, near Settegast Park.

The selective East Early College High School and Middle College High School-Felix Fraga are in Second Ward, on Drennan Street. General public high schoolers west of approximately Sampson Street are zoned to Wheatley High School; those in the eastern section of Second Ward are zoned to Austin High School.

Our Lady of Guadalupe School, a Kindergarten through eighth grade Roman Catholic private school is located on Navigation Boulevard.

==== History of schools ====
Anson Jones Elementary School, named after Anson Jones, was formerly located in the Second Ward. It opened on Elysian Street in 1892. The first building of Rusk Elementary School opened in 1902. Our Lady of Guadalupe School first opened on September 8, 1912, one month after the church's first mass.

When Clayton Homes opened in 1952, Rusk served as its neighborhood elementary school. The old Rusk was demolished so U.S. Route 59 (Eastex Freeway) could be built, and Clayton Homes students were rezoned to Anson Jones Elementary. However HISD perceived Anson Jones's proximity to US59 to be a hazard, and Clayton Homes residents had difficulties with their commute due to traffic issues. HISD built a new Rusk Elementary on Garrow Street, opening in 1960. Clayton Homes was rezoned to that school, and the new Rusk also relieved Lubbock Elementary School. Rusk later became a K-8 school, adding grades 6-8. Principal Felipa Young spearheaded the change because she noticed graduates of Rusk encountering academic or disciplinary trouble in large comprehensive middle schools.

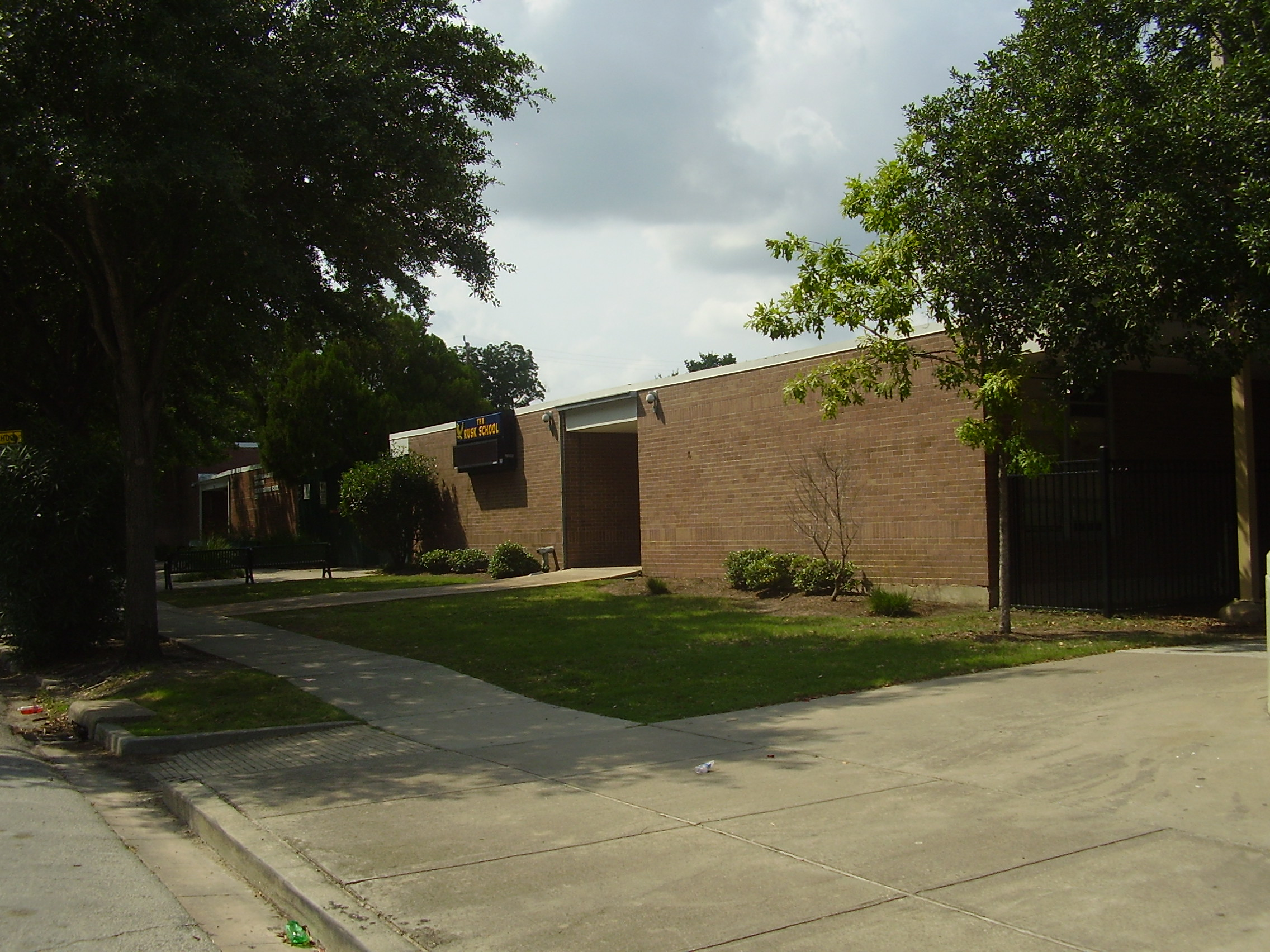
Baylor College of Medicine Biotech Academy at Rusk (the former Rusk Elementary School)

In 1967, Anson Jones Elementary moved to a new location on Canal Street. In several decades leading up to 2006, the school lost population. Charles Ross, the school's final principal, who had served in that capacity for 14 years, said that the school lost about 200 students during his term. As of the 2005-2006 school year, it had a little over 200 students. The student population was mostly Hispanic and African American. Two thirds of the students lived in Clayton Homes. The school closed in 2006. HISD sold the building. The areas formerly zoned to the school were rezoned to the Bruce and Rusk schools. The cafeteria of the former school became a reception hall. Offices of the Urban Harvest organization are now located in Suite 200 of the former school.

E. O. Smith Education Center closed after the 2010-2011 school year; for grades 6 through 8, the Second Ward, previously assigned to E. O. Smith for those grades, was rezoned to Jackson Middle School. Jackson, southeast of Second Ward, was renamed to Yolanda Black Navarro Middle School in 2016, as part of an HISD effort to rename schools associated with the Confederacy.

Beginning in the 2016-2017 school year the elementary zoned grades at Rusk were phased out, with Rusk kindergartners through fifth-graders rezoned to Lantrip and Burnet. The Rusk campus was renamed the Baylor College of Medicine Biotech Academy at Rusk, a magnet school serving grades 6-8.

=== Colleges and universities ===
Residents are zoned to the Houston City College system, which operates the Felix Fraga campus on Drennan Street. The central campus of the University of Houston, due south of the ward, attracts some students as Second Ward residents.

=== Public libraries ===
The Second Ward is served by the Flores Neighborhood branch of the Houston Public Library. Rainwater intrusion from Hurricane Harvey severely damaged the facility in August of 2017; after four years of closure it reopened in January 2021.

== Transportation ==
The Metropolitan Transit Authority of Harris County (METRO) operates public transportation services, including buses and the METRORail tram service. The station on the METRORail Green Line serving this neighborhood is Coffee Plant/Second Ward. Somewhat unique in Houston, no freeway directly feeds into the ward; however, the Elysian viaduct and Interstate 69 occupy the former Frosttown/Alacran neighborhood, directing motorists to and from northeastern Downtown. The massive North Houston Highway Improvement Project will route Interstate 45 through this corridor by 2043. The last remaining freight line in the ward proper separates the area from Downtown and EaDo; Navigation Boulevard and Harrisburg Boulevard pass under this railroad for direct access to and from the city center.

== Culture, parks and recreation ==
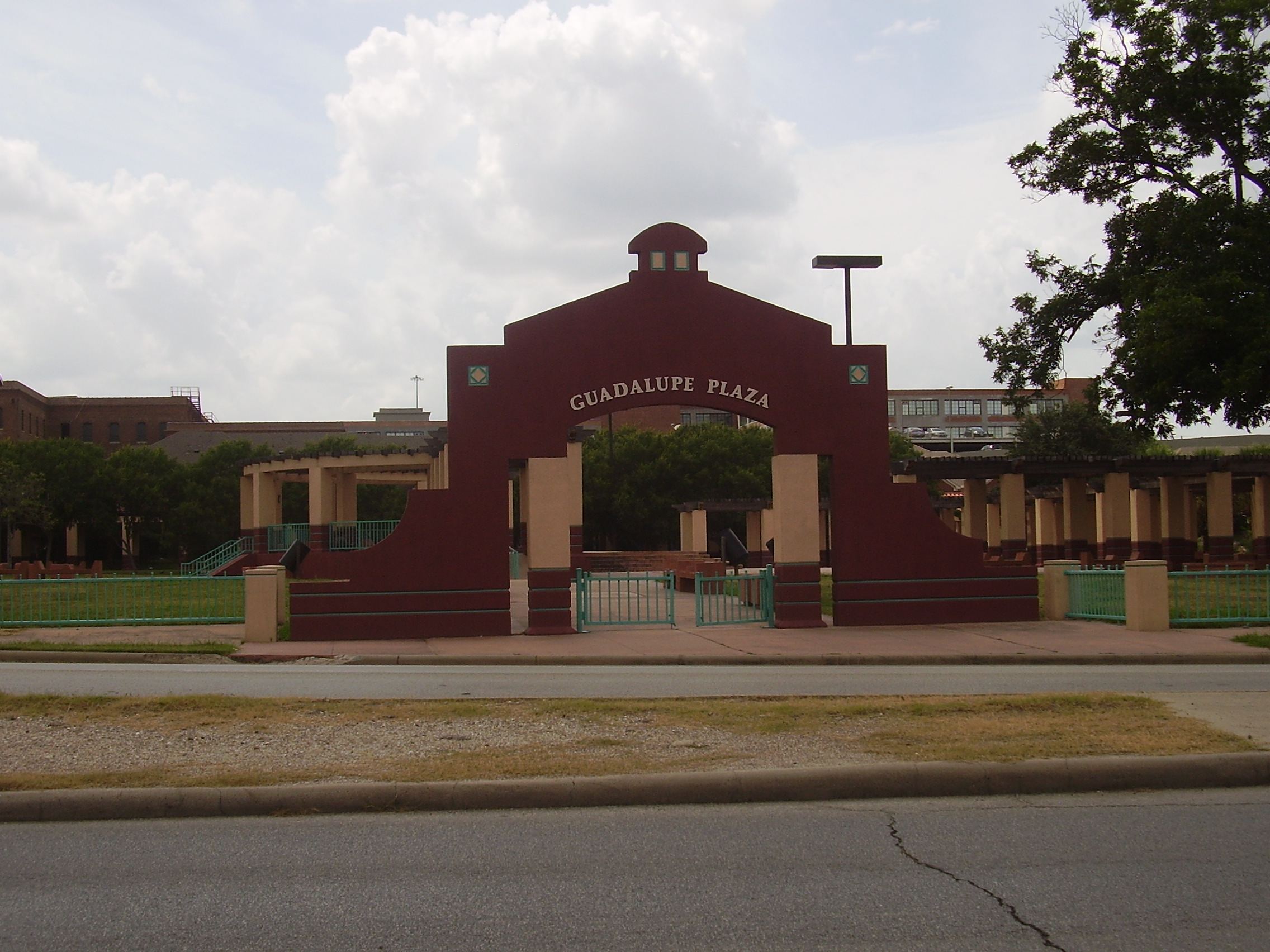
Guadalupe Plaza Park

Our Lady of Guadalupe Catholic Church was the first Mexican ethnic Catholic church to be established in the City of Houston. Historically Mexican-Americans traveled to the church from many Houston neighborhoods on Sundays. The Second Ward was also the place where Houston's first Catholic church, St. Vincent's Church, was established. This church converted into a parish catering to German Americans in 1871 when the larger Annunciation Church opened.

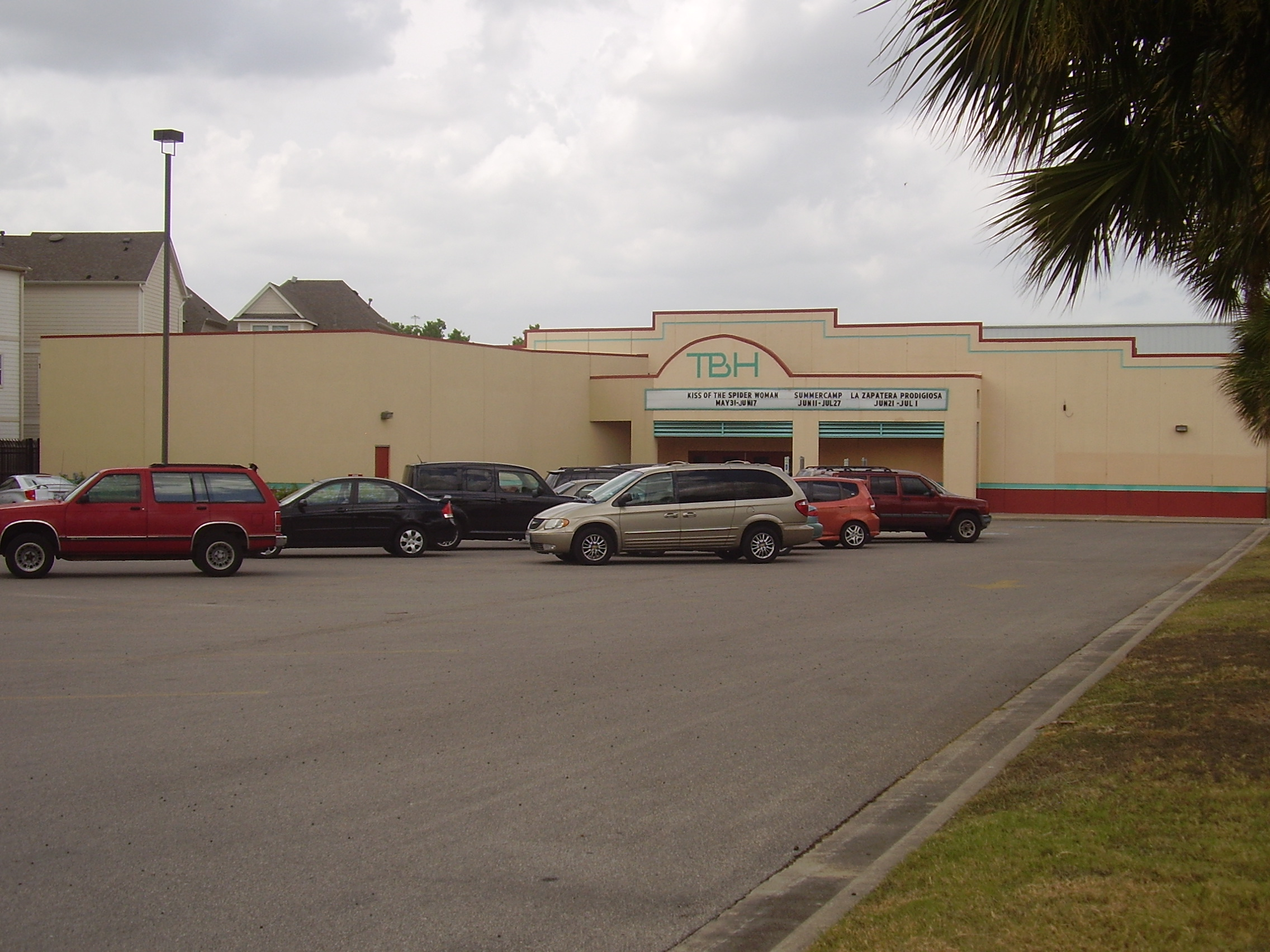
Talento Bilingüe de Houston

Guadalupe Plaza Park is located at 2311 Runnels Street. It includes a sprayground and distinctive fountain. The park was built as a performance venue for the failed El Mercado project. In the 2000s the derelict park was a haven for drunk and homeless individuals. In 2007 several interns with the architecture firm SWA Group presented proposals on how to improve the Guadalupe Plaza area to the Greater East End Management District offices. Residents such as George Helber frequently filed complaints to ask the city of Houston to improve the park. In 2009 the president of the Second Ward Super Neighborhood, Jessica Hulsey, complained about the park's condition. Isa Dadoush, a general services manager of the City of Houston announced that there were plans for a $171,000 upgrade of the park to be completed in the summer of that year, and that the city was advertising for a construction contractor to do the job. Reconstruction of the park began in 2014, and was completed in 2016.

Tony Marron Park, on the south bank of Buffalo Bayou, is currently closed for renovation and expansion. It is expected to reopen in 2027. A walking and cyclist trail runs along this bank, connecting the ward to Downtown. A rails to trails corridor runs from Milby Street, parallel to Harrisburg Boulevard and continuing east to the Magnolia Park neighborhood. Settegast Park is adjacent to the Rusk School on Garrow Street, and is over a century old. Eastwood Park, just southeast of the ward, contains a swimming pool and is frequented by ward residents. in 2025 Garver Park reopened as a green space at Lockwood Drive and Buffalo Bayou.

The Navigation Esplanade, built in 2013, is 3-block pedestrian park located between North St. Charles Street and Delano Street. The esplanade hosts small eateries and markets and often serves as a festival venue. Upon its opening, State Representative Carol Alvarado remarked, “Those of us that grew up in the East End, we have been very appreciative of the changes we have seen in our community. And we know it’s been a balancing act to make sure we can maintain the history and the culture of our community, and this project here allows us to do that.”

== Notable residents ==
- Ninfa Laurenzo

== See also ==
- History of Mexican Americans in Houston

== Bibliography ==
- Esparza, Jesus Jesse (2011). "La Colonia Mexicana: A History of Mexican Americans in Houston" (PDF). Houston History Magazine. 9 (1): 2–8.
- Garza, Natalie (2011). "The "Mother Church" of Mexican Catholicism in Houston" (PDF). Houston History Magazine. 9 (1): 14–19.
- McWhorter, Thomas (2010). "From Das Zweiter to El Segundo, A Brief History of Houston's Second Ward" (PDF). Houston History Magazine. 8 (1): 39–42.
- Rodriguez, Nestor. "Hispanic and Asian Immigration Waves in Houston." in: Chafetz, Janet Salzman and Helen Rose Ebaugh (editors). Religion and the New Immigrants: Continuities and Adaptations in Immigrant Congregations. AltaMira Press, October 18, 2000. ISBN 0759117128, 9780759117129.
  - Also available in: Ebaugh, Helen Rose Fuchs and Janet Saltzman Chafetz (editors). Religion and the New Immigrants: Continuities and Adaptations in Immigrant Congregations. Rowman & Littlefield, January 1, 2000. 0742503909, 9780742503908.
- San Miguel, Guadalupe, Jr. (2005). Brown, Not White: School Integration and the Chicano Movement in Houston. College Station, TX: Texas A&M University Press. ISBN 978-1-58544-493-9.
- "1999-2003 Community Health Profiles Second Ward Super Neighborhood" (PDF). City of Houston.
