= Our Lady of Guadalupe School (Houston) =

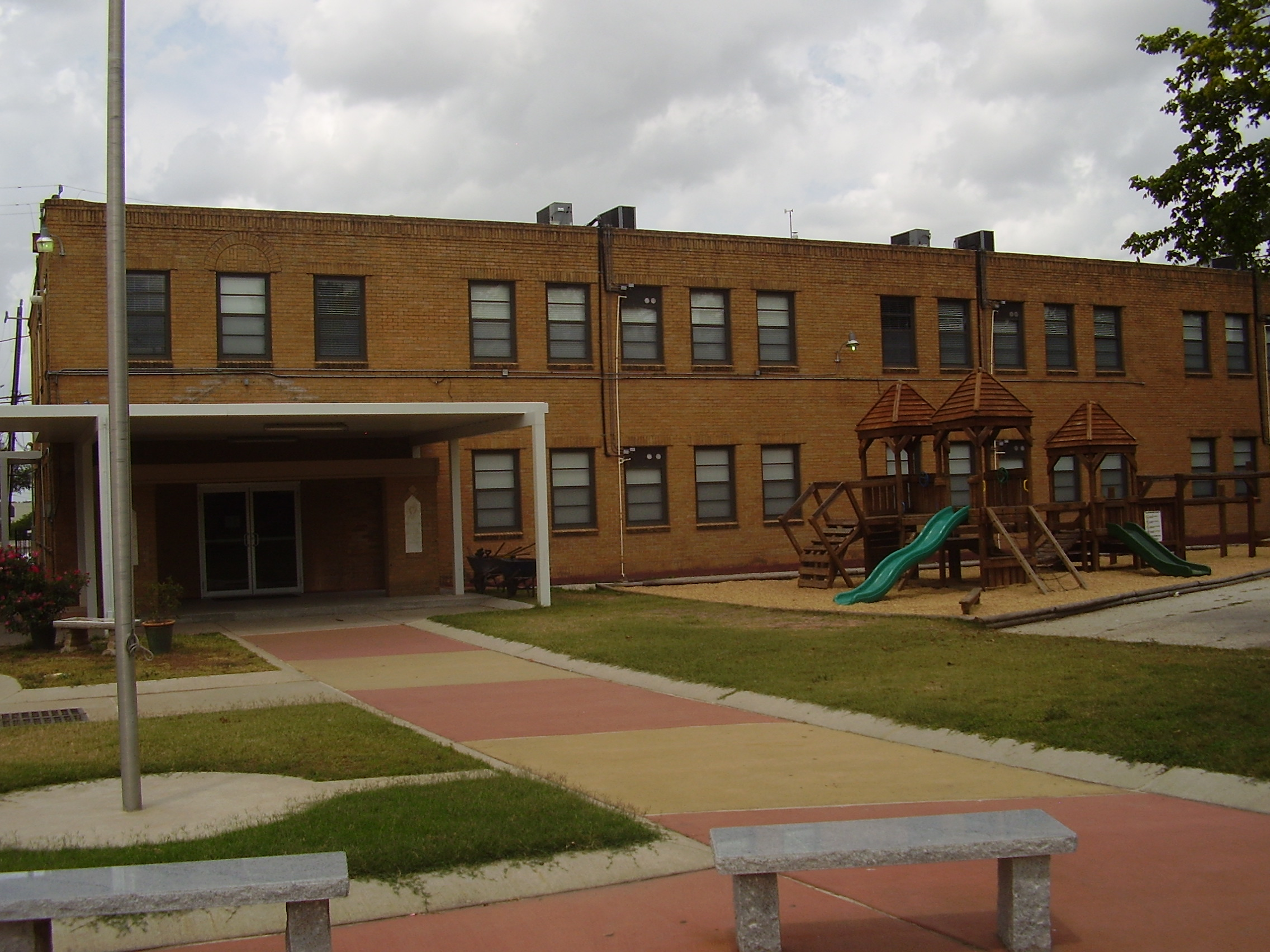
- OLG classroom building

Location
- 2405 Navigation Blvd; Houston, Texas 77003; USA; 29.7595°N 95.3441°W

Information
- Type: Private
- Motto: A wealth of spirit and tradition
- Religious affiliation: Roman Catholic
- Established: September 8, 1912
- Oversight: Archdiocese of Galveston-Houston
- Principal: Mrs. Irazema Ortiz
- Chaplain: Fr. Day Nguyen
- Grades: PK3–8
- Gender: Coeducational
- Campus type: Urban
- Color: Maroon
- Mascot: Eagles
- Website: www.olgschoolhouston.org

Our Lady of Guadalupe Catholic School (Spanish: Escuela de Nuestra Señora de Guadalupe) is a Roman Catholic K-8 school in the Second Ward in the East End, Houston, Texas. It is the parish school of the Our Lady of Guadalupe Catholic Church of the Roman Catholic Archdiocese of Galveston-Houston.

Our Lady of Guadalupe Catholic School is the oldest continuously operating Catholic elementary school in the City of Houston. As of 2010 the school's parish is one of the poorest Catholic parishes in Greater Houston.

== History ==
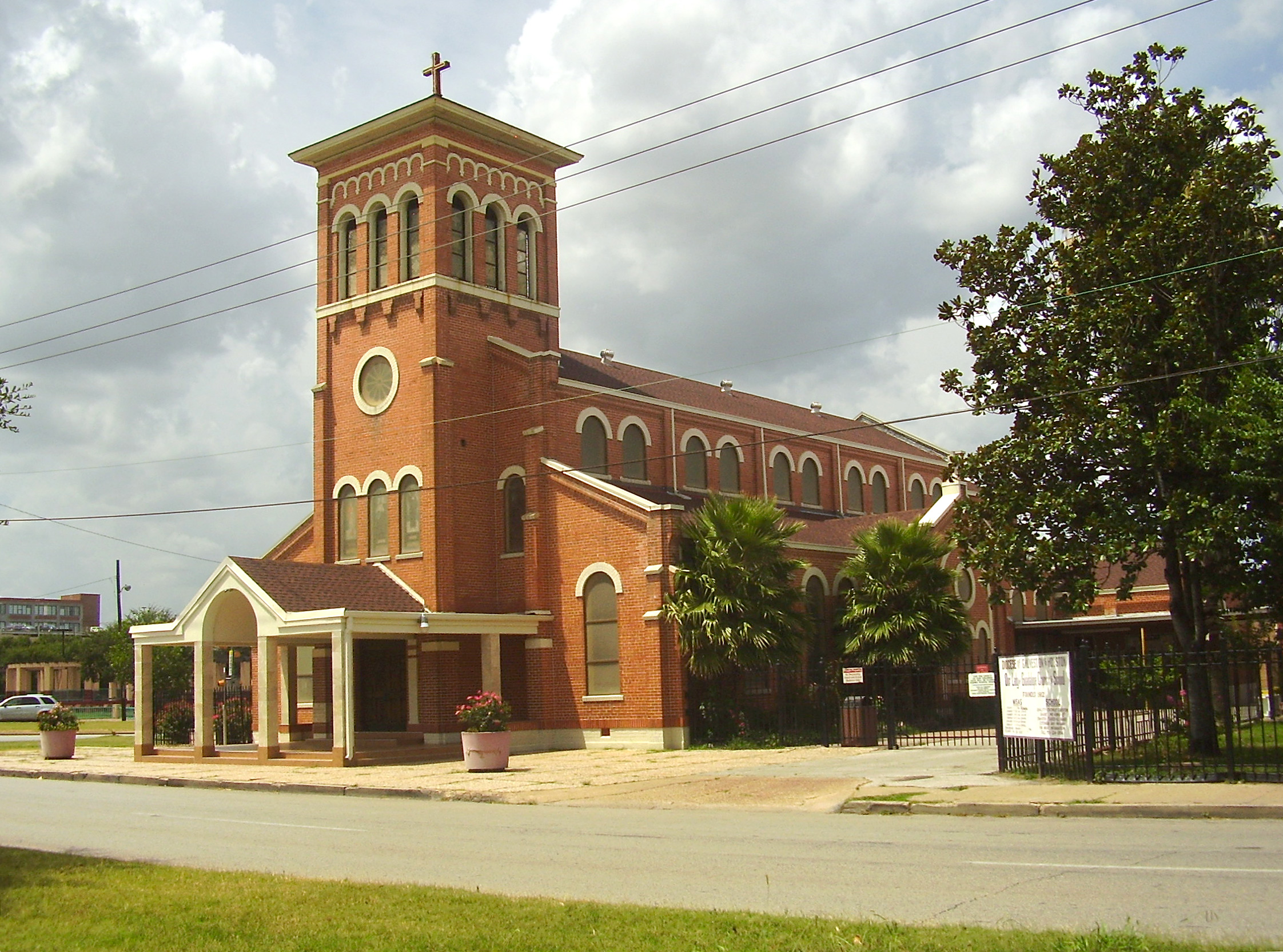
Our Lady of Guadalupe Catholic Church

The school first opened on September 8, 1912, one month after the church's first Mass. Although founded by the Oblates of Mary Immaculate, the Sisters of Divine Providence of Texas (C.D.P.) operated the school for most its existence. The Sisters initially commuted to OLG School from the already established Immaculate Conception School (closed 1969); their presence in OLG School lasted for 87 years. Historically at least one Sister from the group served as the school's director of religious education. In the 1912–13 school year the school had 30 students.

The school was originally located on the lower floor of the two-story church building. Sister Mary Benitia Vermeersch, C.D.P., born in Belgium, began operating the school in 1915, when it had 85 students enrolled; she was assigned there due to her knowledge of Mexican culture and her proficiency in Spanish.

By 1935 the school had 428 students. Natalie Garza, author of "The “Mother Church” of Mexican Catholicism in Houston," wrote that

[a]s a teacher and principal, Sister Benitia saw it as her duty to personally encourage Mexican American families to send their children to Our Lady of Guadalupe School.

As a result, enrollment increased under her watch. After a new church facility opened in 1923, the previous church facility was remodeled, and began to be entirely used as a school and for social activities. The current school building, established to be resistant against fire, was opened in 1948. The pastor, the Rev. Agapito Santos, supervised the construction of the two-story current school building, and he also oversaw the construction of the gymnasium in 1952.

After the Sisters of Divine Providence withdrew from the school, John Louis Morkovsky, the Bishop of Galveston-Houston, asked the Dominican Sisters to administer the school on a temporary basis, and the Dominican Sisters managed the school for a five-year period. As the Dominican Sisters administered the OLG School, members of the Religious of the Sacred Heart (R.S.C.J.) from Duchesne Academy of the Sacred Heart volunteered to teach at OLG. The Sisters of the Sacred Heart became full-time teachers there, and in 1983 they began to manage the school on a permanent basis.

In 1985 the school purchased individual air conditioning units that were installed in classrooms. In 1995 the school renovated the gymnasium and installed a cafeteria there. The school subsequently installed a playground adjacent to the school building. In a 20-year period before 2012 the school acquired a plot of land which had overgrown vegetation. Parents and friends of OLG cleared the field so that the schoolchildren could use it, and the land is now known as Eagle Field. Subsequently, the Roman Catholic Archdiocese of Galveston-Houston allowed the school to begin using a house previously used by Catholic Charities, and the art and music classes of OLG were moved into this house. Four years prior to 2012, the school opened a covered area which shelters individuals moving between buildings during inclement weather.

In 2010 the archdiocese launched a campaign to stabilize OLG and twelve other inner city Catholic schools so they could stay open. The school scheduled completion of a newly installed roof and a tuck pointing and sealing of the school building in the northern hemisphere summer of 2012.

OLG remained open as other area Catholic schools closed due to low enrollment. As of 2012 many elementary school classes have waiting lists.

=== Curriculum ===
Historically OLG students learned the English language, history, arithmetic, geography, and the Roman Catholic religion. The language of instruction historically has been English.

=== Student body ===
As of 2010, the school had 240 students. Half of them received financial assistance. The students, as of 2010, originated from 46 ZIP codes in Greater Houston. Of the students, one third lived within the parish. Jeannie Kever of the Houston Chronicle said in 2010 that "many others have family ties to the school." As of 2012 the OLG school had over 500 students, originating from 30 other ZIP codes in Greater Houston.

=== Tuition and financial support ===
As of 2010, tuition was about $3,030 ($4473.56 in current money) per year, with discounts given to siblings. Jeannie Kever of the Houston Chronicle said "That's still out of reach for many families." At that time, Houston area Catholic schools generally spent $5,800 per child. During that year, half of the school's 240 students received financial aid that helped them go to the school. As of the 2012–13 school year, tuition is $3,420 per year for Pre-Kindergarten and Kindergarten students, $3,265 per year for first-time grade school students, and $2,125 per year for second and subsequent time grade school students, and other fees apply.

Historically the school used bazaars, beauty queen pageants, and tamale sales, organized by parents, to gain additional financial support. Garza said "[t]his type of school fundraising remains an important financial resource." As of 2010, the school raised $45,000 ($66439.04 in current money) annually from its raffles and festivals. The Priests of the Sacred Heart donates $55,000 per year to the school. St. Martha's Catholic Church in Kingwood, Houston annually gives some funding to the OLG School. The Roman Catholic Archdiocese of Galveston-Houston annually gives $130,000 in tuition assistance to OLG students. Every OLG family is required to donate 20 volunteer hours to the school per year.

When the school was first established, it did not charge its students tuition. The school began charging for tuition in the 1934–35 school year, with $.25 ($6.02 with inflation considered) to .50 per pupil ($12.03 with inflation considered). Natalie Garza said that the tuition was "minimal."

=== Student discipline ===
Garza said that during the school's operations in the early 20th century "The sisters had a reputation for strictness" and that "[s]ome aspects of Mexican American youth culture were derided at the school." For instance the school did not allow students to have haircuts in the "pachuco" hairstyle and students found with the hair were sent home and forbidden to return unless they cut their hair. In addition, in Garza's article, alumnus Vincent Santiago recalled that the "Sisters of Divine Providence were very concerned about us because we were young and they knew way back in the 1940s [that] jobs were hard to get. They encouraged us to go to high school, learn as much as we could or not to get in trouble...to keep on going [on] the right track and that is what I have done." Santiago recalled that the school prohibited the speaking of Spanish on school grounds and that "The Sisters of Divine Providence said,‘When you are in school, speak English. When you are out of school, speak Spanish.’ Simple, very simple."

== See also ==
- History of the Mexican-Americans in Houston
- Christianity in Houston
