= Our Lady of Guadalupe Catholic Church (Houston) =

First Mexican American Catholic church in Houston, Texas

Coordinates: 29.7592°N 95.3451°W

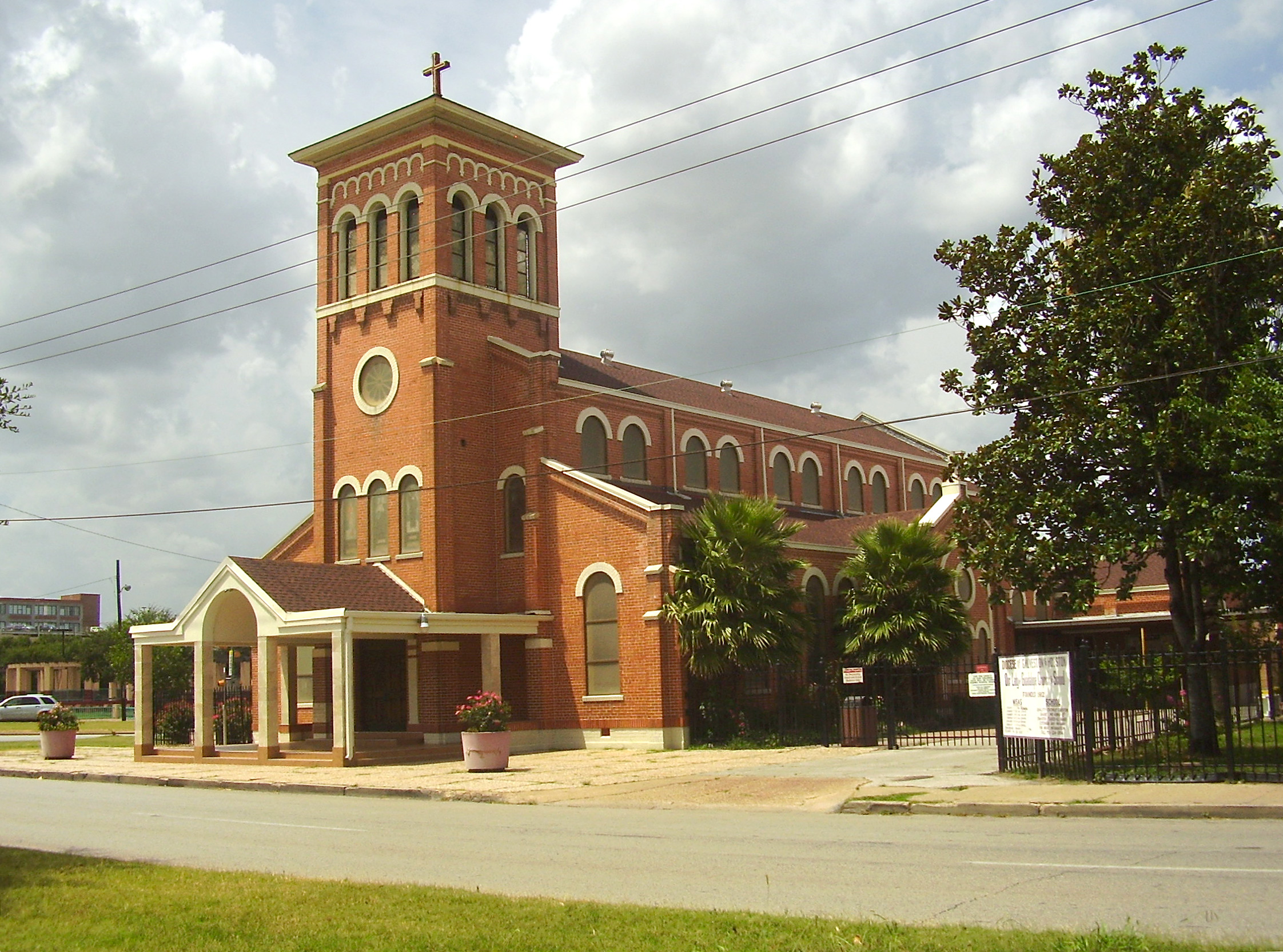
Facade of the present church.

Our Lady of Guadalupe Catholic Church (Spanish: Iglesia Nuestra Señora de Guadalupe) is a Catholic church located in the Second Ward in the East End, Houston, Texas. It is part of the Archdiocese of Galveston-Houston.

The church, first constructed in 1911, was the first Mexican American church in Houston. It was the first religious institution in the City of Houston to offer religious services in the Spanish language. The church opened one of the first schools for Mexican American children, and it operates programs that provide food and shelter for needy individuals. As of 2012, the church serves 3,500 families. Many of its masses are held in Spanish. The surrounding neighborhood is predominantly Hispanic. As of 2010, OLG is one of the poorest Catholic parishes in Greater Houston. It includes the Our Lady of Guadalupe School, the oldest Catholic elementary school in Houston.

== History ==
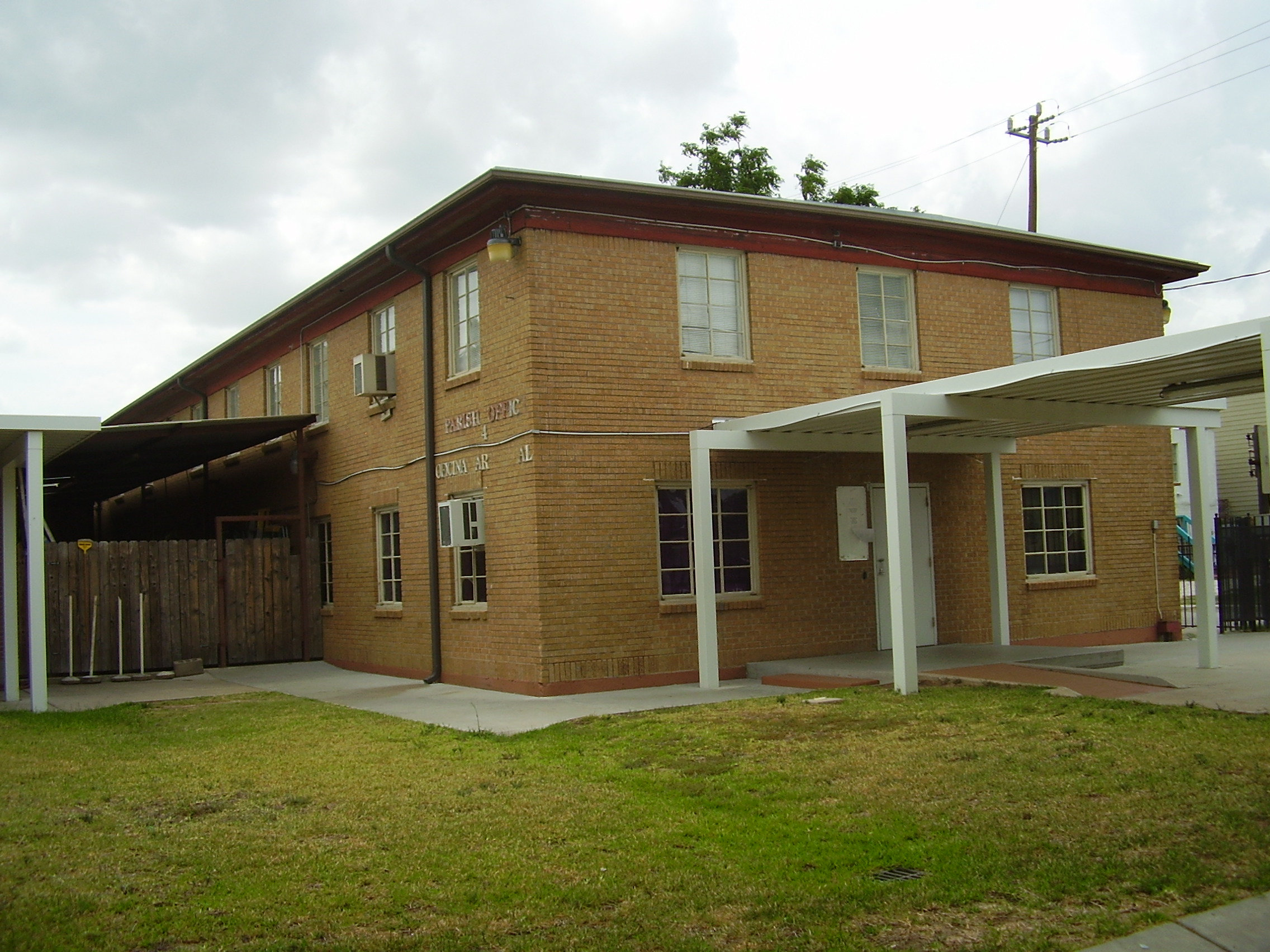
OLG Parish Office

In 1910, there were no Mexican Catholic churches in Houston. Some Mexicans were excluded from attending Anglo Catholic churches. Mexicans who did attend found themselves discriminated against. In 1911, the Diocese of Galveston brought a series of priests, the Oblates of Mary Immaculate, intended to minister to the Mexican population of Houston. Our Lady of Guadalupe was then opened in 1912. The first mass was held on August 18, 1912, in a two-story frame facility that was a gift from the Catholic Church Extension Society; It had been erected during that year. Father Robert Chatillon, OMI was the first celebrant. The church was located on the upper floor, while the Catholic school was located on the lower floor.

The archdiocese established Our Lady of Guadalupe so that White people accustomed to the segregation of races did not find offense with the presence of Mexican people in their churches.

In the 1920s a group of Louisiana Creole people attended OLG because of OLG was the closest church to the Frenchtown area of the Fifth Ward; the closest black church, St. Nicholas, was located in the Third Ward. Because the OLG church treated the Creole people in a discriminatory manner, by forcing them to confess and take communion after people of other races did so and after forcing them to take the back pews, the Creoles opted to build their own church, opening Our Mother of Mercy Catholic Church in 1929.

As more Mexican Americans settled in Houston, large numbers of people commuted from other Houston neighborhoods to OLG on Sundays to worship. Father Esteban de Anta, a Spanish man, was the first Spanish-speaking priest at Our Lady of Guadalupe. He arrived in 1919. In 1923, a new church facility opened, designed with Lombard Romanesque style features by the prominent San Antonio architect, Leo M.J. Dielmann. The previous church facility was remodeled, and began to be used entirely as a school and for social activities.

The Oblate priests served the church for many years, before leaving in 1973. During that year, Priests of the Sacred Heart began serving the OLG parish in place of the Oblate priests. In the 1980s, OLG became a territorial parish, and it adopted geographic boundaries. Natalie Garza, author of The 'Mother Church' of Mexican Catholicism in Houston, said: "it remains heavily Mexican American and Latino based."

On August 18, 2012, the church celebrated 100 years of Masses.

== School ==
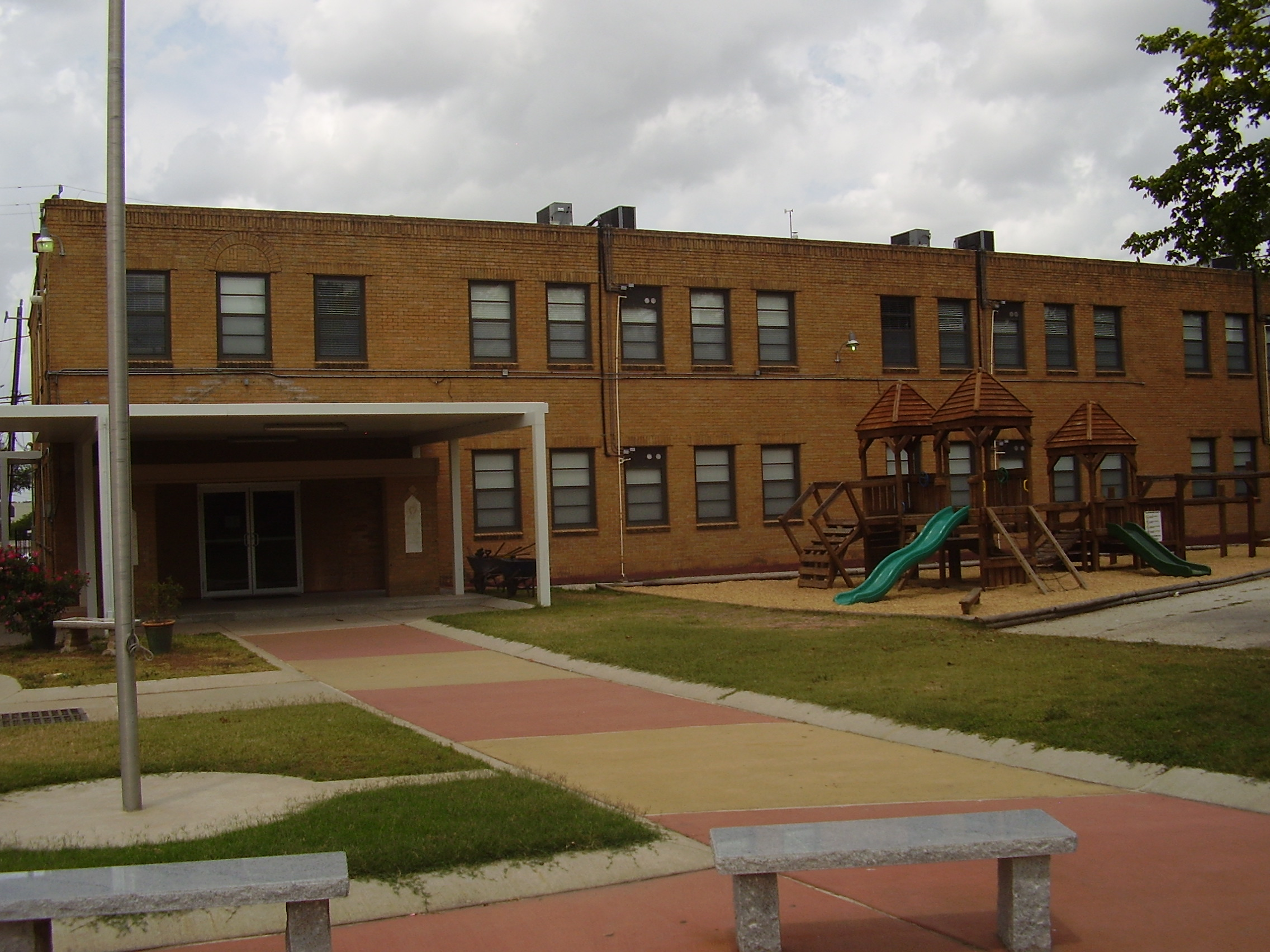
Our Lady of Guadalupe School classroom building

Our Lady of Guadalupe Catholic School is the oldest Catholic elementary school in the City of Houston. The school first opened on September 8, 1912, one month after the church's first mass. As of 2012, the OLG school has over 500 students, originating from over 30 ZIP codes in Greater Houston. As of that year, many elementary school classes have waiting lists. The school is the oldest Catholic elementary school in Houston.

== Recreation ==
Historically, OLG held bazaars which featured popular bands. During the 1930s, two musicians from Houston, Ventura Alonzo and Lydia Mendoza, performed at OLG events.

== See also ==
- History of the Mexican-Americans in Houston
- Christianity in Houston
