= Houston Intermodal Transit Center =

Unbuilt transit station in Houston, Texas

Burnett Plaza

General information
- Location: Main Street and Burnett Street, Houston, Texas
- Coordinates: 29.772432°N 95.359873°W
- System: Intermodal
- Owner: Metropolitan Transit Authority of Harris County, Texas
- Connections: Intercity Bus, Light Rail

Construction
- Accessible: yes

Key dates
- Cancelled: February 2011

Proposed services
Preceding station	METRORail	Following station
UH–Downtown toward Fannin South	Red Line	Quitman/Near Northside toward Northline Transit Center/HCC
Preceding station	Amtrak	Following station
San Antonio toward Los Angeles	Sunset Limited	Beaumont toward New Orleans
Location

The Houston Intermodal Transit Center (also known as Burnett Plaza) was a planned hub for local, commuter, and intercity transit in Houston, Texas, United States. The site is located adjacent to the campus of the University of Houston–Downtown (UHD). The center would have eventually replaced the Houston Amtrak station, as well as various bus terminals throughout the city such as Greyhound Lines.

== Design ==
The transit center was designed by EE&K. The plan for the structure would have been a modern glass and steel building surrounding a "great space". Because the facility would have been built over the tracks, one of the dominant features would have been a grand staircase. The center was designed as a multi-level station with heavy rail (commuter, Amtrak, Union Pacific freight) running under a large public space with light rail running via an elevated structure. Main Street would have been split into Upper Main Street, with access to the station at the level of the public space in a loop, and Lower Main Street, which would have gone underneath the entire station and continued on as North Main Street.

== Cancellation ==
Following METRO's 2010 annual audit, the agency decided to cancel the project as part of a US$168 million write-down of worthless or non-existent assets. The value of the land US$21 million was to be recorded separately as a remaining asset.

A smaller light rail station and bus terminal, named Burnett Transit Center, opened in 2013 on the southeast corner of Main and Burnett.
