= McGowen station =

Light rail station in Houston, Texas

McGowen
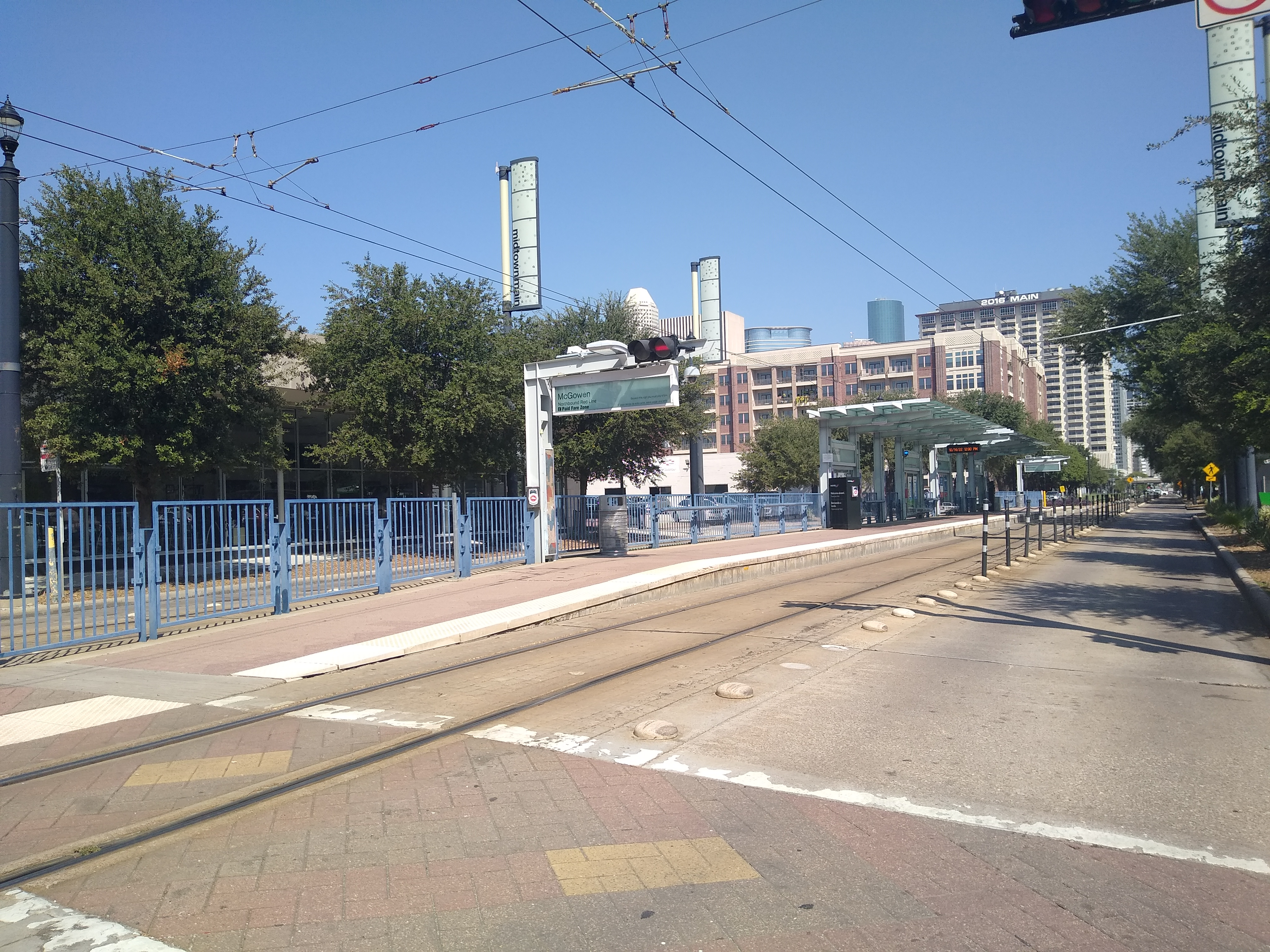
- Northbound platforms for McGowen station

General information
- Location: Main Street at McGowen Street
- Coordinates: 29°44′44.76″N 95°22′25.7″W
- Owner: METRO
- Line: Red Line
- Platforms: 1 island platform
- Tracks: two

Construction
- Parking: none
- Accessible: Yes

History
- Opened: January 1, 2004; 22 years ago

Services
Preceding station	METRORail	Following station
Ensemble/HCC toward Fannin South	Red Line	Downtown Transit Center toward Northline Transit Center/HCC
Location

McGowen is an island platformed METRORail light rail station in Houston, Texas, United States. The station was opened on January 1, 2004 and is operated by the Metropolitan Transit Authority of Harris County, Texas (METRO). Located in Midtown, this station is at the intersection of Main Street and McGowen Street. The station is split into two platforms: northbound is located on Main north of McGowen and southbound is located on Main south of McGowen.

== Design and artwork ==
The McGowen station was designed by local artist Floyd Newsum, as "an interpretation of the look and feel of the physical landscape of Midtown Houston." This includes mosaic-paneled columns, skyline-patterned railings and colored pavement along the platform. Motifs include images from historical Third Ward mansions. The mosaic panels were made by artist Jonathan Brown and NATEX Corporation was the station's architect.
