= UH–Downtown station =

Tram stop in Houston, Texas, United States

UH–Downtown
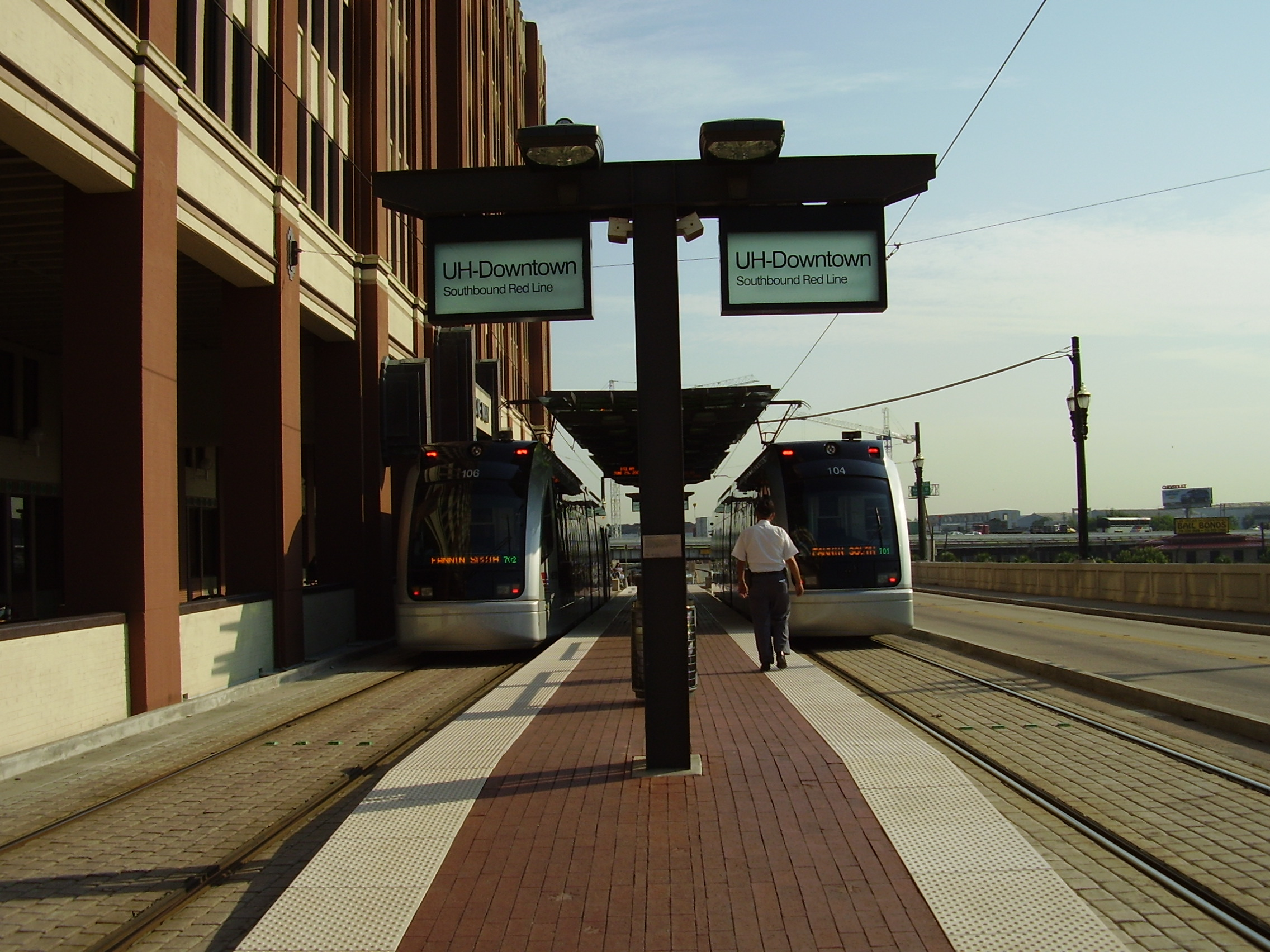

General information
- Location: One Main Street
- Coordinates: 29°45′57.34″N 95°21′30.39″W
- Owner: METRO
- Line: Red Line
- Platforms: Island
- Tracks: Two

Construction
- Parking: Not available
- Cycle facilities: Racks on the campus of the University of Houston–Downtown; Bikes allowed on train during off peak times (Weekdays: 9am–3pm & 8pm–Close; Weekends: All Times)
- Accessible: Yes

History
- Opened: January 1, 2004; 22 years ago

Passengers
- June 2026: 392 (avg. weekday ridership) (Qcard)

Services
Preceding station	METRORail	Following station
Preston toward Fannin South	Red Line	Burnett Transit Center toward Northline Transit Center/HCC
Location

UH–Downtown is a station on the METRORail Red Line in Houston, Texas, United States. It is the former northern terminus of the Red Line, since the line was extended in late 2013. The station is located on top of the Main Street viaduct at the campus of the University of Houston–Downtown.

Due to space limitations, it has an extremely narrow platform. As a result, the ticket vending machines are located on the property of the University of Houston–Downtown.

== Bus connections ==
A bus stop is located just north of the platform. Connecting bus routes are:

- 51 Hardy-Kelly
- 52 Hardy-Ley

== Points of interest ==
The One Main Building (formerly Merchants and Manufacturers Building) and Willow Street Pump Station are listed on the National Register of Historic Places. Both buildings are located on the campus of the University of Houston–Downtown.

The One Main Building is adjacent to the METRORail station at 1 Main Street. The Willow Street Pump Station is within walking distance at 811 North San Jacinto Street.

Allen's Landing—the birthplace of the city of Houston—is at the confluence of White Oak Bayou and Buffalo Bayou, and Allen's Landing Park is adjacent to the University of Houston–Downtown.

From 2004 to 2013, this station was the northernmost point in the Metro Red Line.
