= Quitman/Near Northside station =

Light rail station in Houston, Texas

Quitman/Near Northside
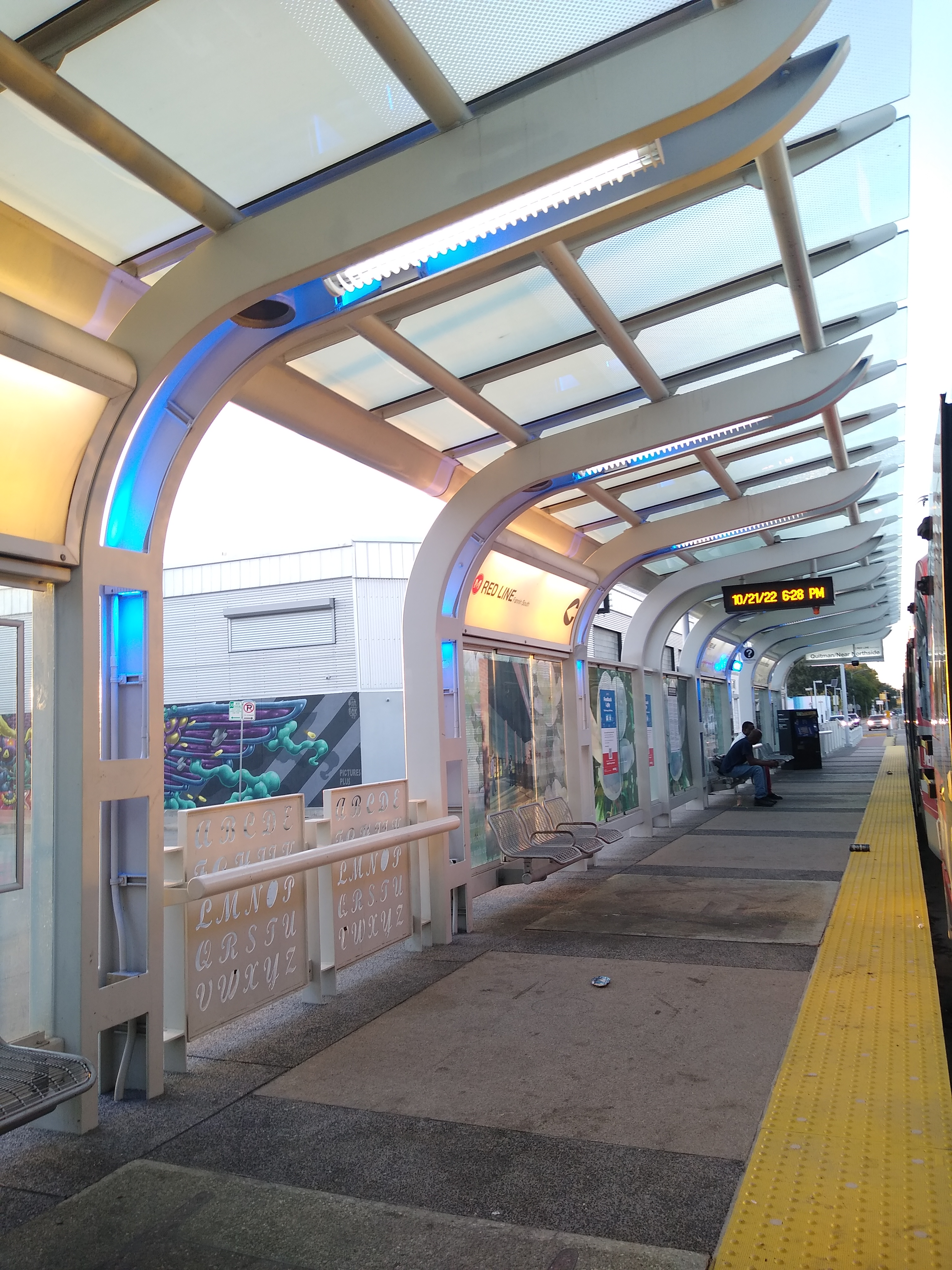

General information
- Location: Northbound: 2321 North Main St. Southbound: 2236 North Main St. Houston, Texas
- Coordinates: 29.7804°N 95.3637°W
- Owner: Metropolitan Transit Authority of Harris County
- Line: Red Line
- Platforms: 2 island platforms
- Tracks: 2
- Connections: METRO: 66; METRO Community Connector (M-F): Heights, Near Northside

Construction
- Structure type: At-grade
- Parking: 8 spaces
- Cycle facilities: 9 covered spaces, repair station
- Accessible: Yes

History
- Opened: December 21, 2013; 12 years ago

Passengers
- June 2026: 372(avg. weekday ridership)

Services
Preceding station	METRORail	Following station
Burnett Transit Center toward Fannin South	Red Line	Fulton/North Central toward Northline Transit Center/HCC
Location

Quitman/Near Northside station (also known as Quitman station) is a light rail station in the Near Northside neighborhood of Houston, Texas, United States. The station is operated by the Metropolitan Transit Authority of Harris County (METRO) and serves the Red Line of its METRORail system.

The station is located in the median of Main Street at its intersection with Quitman Street. It is the northernmost Red Line station to be located on Main Street; following Red Line stations are instead located on Fulton Street. The station is adjacent to Ketelsen Elementary School, and it is also 1/2 mile (0.80 km) southwest of Marshall Middle School and Northside High School.

== History ==
A station at Quitman Street was planned as part of the North Line, which extended the Red Line north from UH Downtown to Northside/HCC. Initially, the station was simply named Quitman station. In 2011, following a community survey, METRO changed the station's name to Quitman/Near Northside.

The station's location at Quitman and Main was viewed by both city and regional planners as a promising location for development, with a Houston-Galveston Area Council study referring to the station as "a key gateway into the 'heart of Northside' area". In 2012, an independent research team produced a health impact assessment for several transit-oriented development proposals in the area surrounding the station. According to the authors, the study was the first such assessment for any rail station in Texas.

Due to the station's proximity to three schools, artist Leticia Huerta designed its windscreens and platforms with an educational theme. The station opened with the North Line extension on December 21, 2013.

In 2016, following the murder of schoolchild in the surrounding area, METRO opted to increase police presence at the station.

In 2025, METRO expanded its Community Connector microtransit service into Near Northside and neighboring The Heights. Both neighborhoods' service zones utilize Quitman/Near Northside as a transfer point between Community Connector and METRORail.
