= Downtown Transit Center (Houston) =

Light rail and bus station in Houston, Texas, US

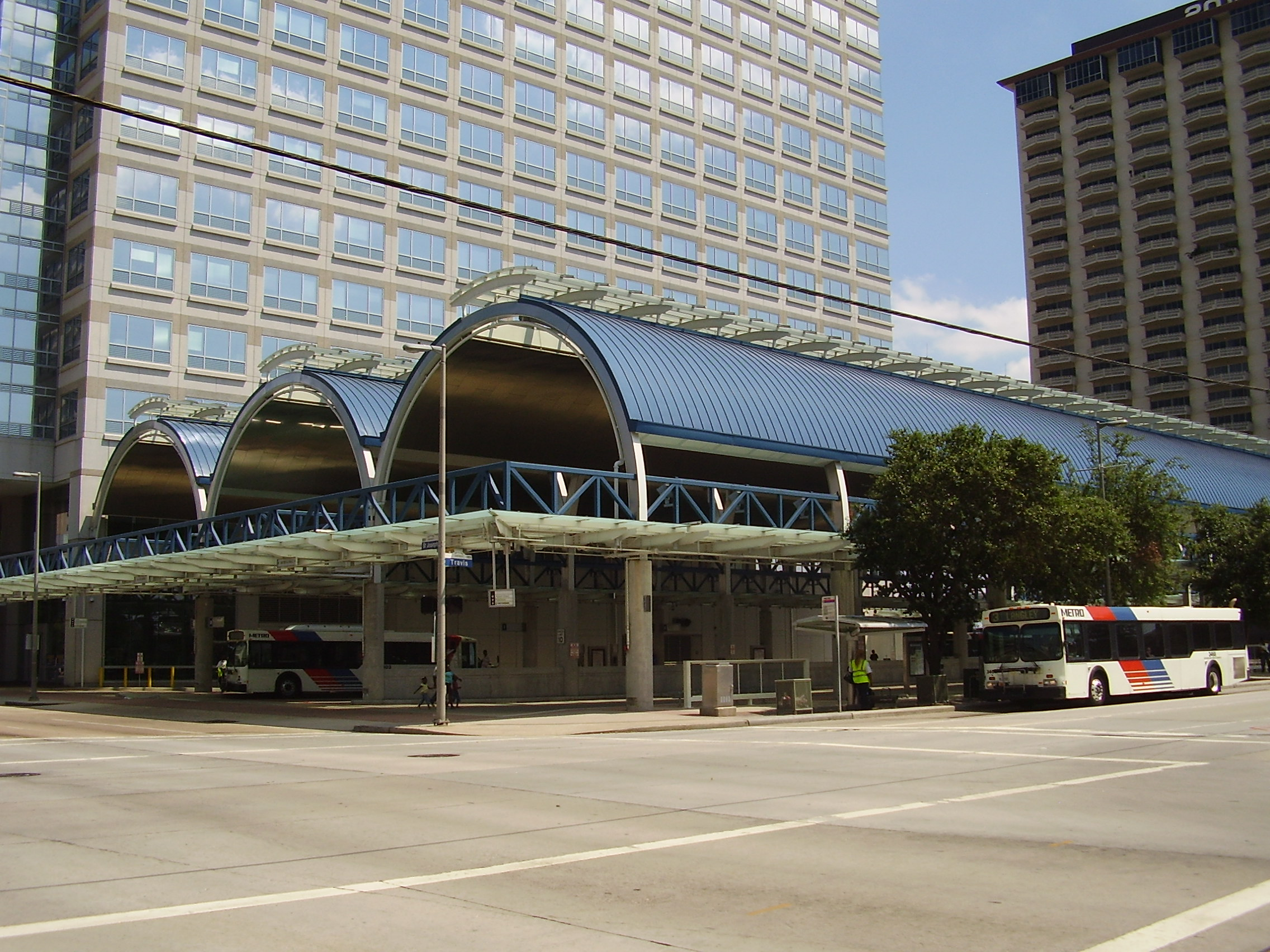
- Downtown Transit Center bus station, with Lee P. Brown Administration Building in background

General information
- Location: Northbound rail: 1840 Main Street; Southbound rail: 1914 Main Street; Bus: 1900 Main Street; Houston, Texas
- Coordinates: 29°45′2.1″N 95°22′11.72″W
- Owner: Metropolitan Transit Authority of Harris County
- Line: Red Line
- Platforms: 2 island platforms
- Tracks: 2
- Bus stands: 9
- Connections: METRO: 6, 11, 35, 44, 51, 52, 54, 82, 85, 102, 108, 137, 161, 162; METRO Park & Ride: 222, 236, 244, 247, 249; METRO Community Connector: Downtown Zone

Construction
- Structure type: At-grade
- Cycle facilities: 20 parking spaces
- Accessible: Yes

History
- Opened: January 1, 2004; 22 years ago

Services
Preceding station	METRORail	Following station
McGowen toward Fannin South	Red Line	Bell toward Northline Transit Center/HCC
Location

Downtown Transit Center is an intermodal transit center in Downtown Houston, Texas, United States. The station is operated by the Metropolitan Transit Authority of Harris County (METRO), serving both the Red Line of its METRORail system and nineteen bus routes. It is the southernmost Red Line station in Downtown Houston. The station also services METRO's headquarters, the Lee P. Brown Administration Building.

The transit center is divided into rail and bus stations. The rail station consists of two island platforms, one for northbound service and one for southbound service, at the intersection of Main Street and St. Joseph Parkway. The bus station, located on the opposite side of the Administration Building at St. Joseph Parkway and Travis Street, consists of nine covered bus bays and a METRO RideStore customer service center.

== History ==
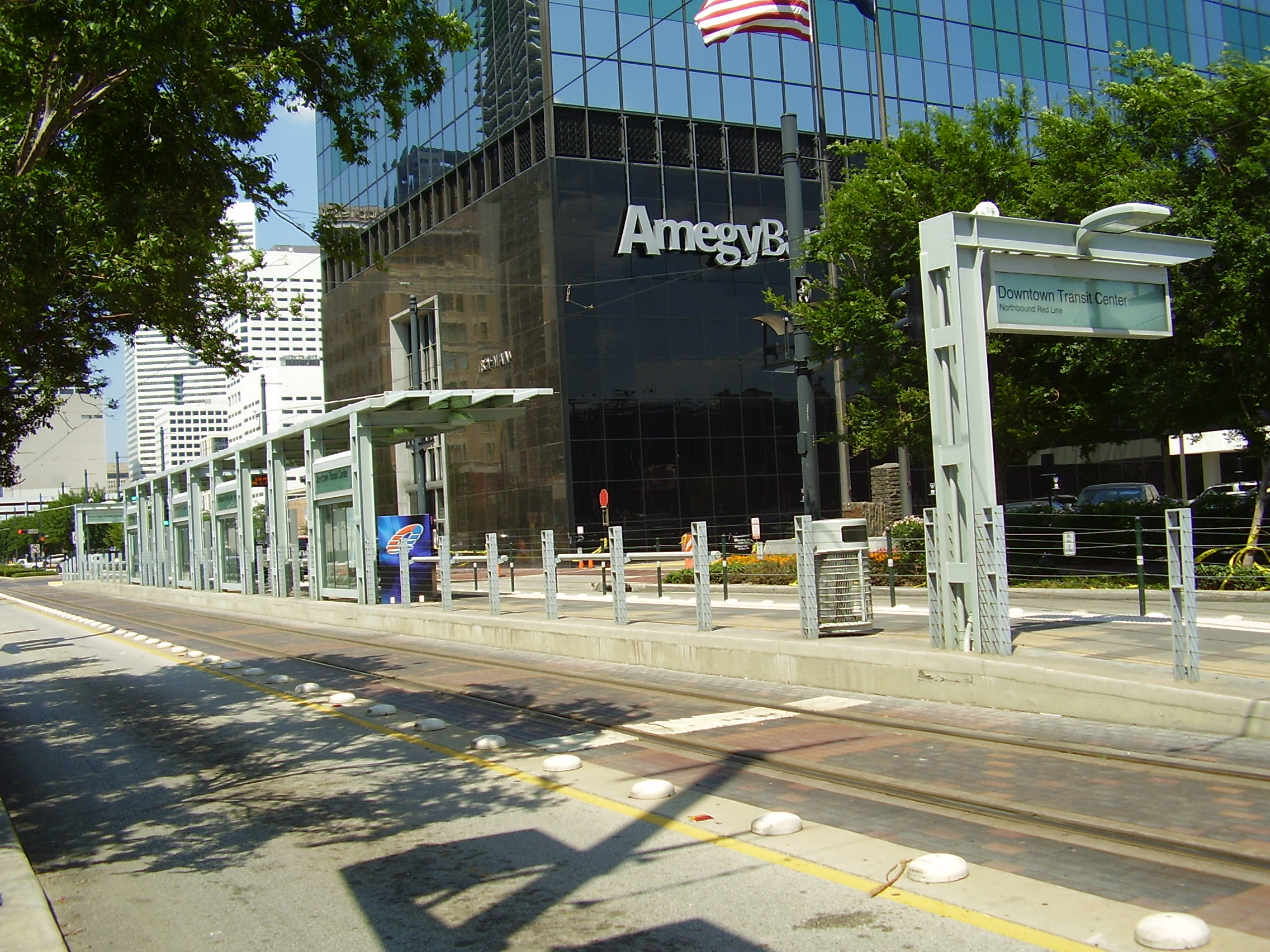
Northbound light rail platform

In 1993, METRO began negotiating locations for a $17 million downtown bus transit facility, which would reduce bus traffic along Main Street and accommodate the larger volume of downtown buses required by its Regional Bus Plan. The proposal encountered resistance from downtown business interests, who desired a location south of the Pierce Elevated (I-45) to reduce disruption to downtown pedestrian corridors, as well as local churches and condominiums, who cited noise and vibration concerns. METRO selected a location just north of the Pierce Elevated, which was viewed as a "compromise" site, with a planned opening date of 1999.

In 1997, due to funding issues, construction of the center was delayed to 2010. However, in 2000, the project was re-prioritized and set to open in 2005, which would correspond with the end of METRO headquarters' lease at Louisiana Place and the planned opening of a new light rail line. The facility was simply named Downtown Transit Center, though an alternative proposal suggested the name Cathedral Square in reference to the nearby Co-Cathedral of the Sacred Heart.

In 2001, the site was used for a groundbreaking ceremony for the rail line. In late 2003, Houston Metro opted to name the headquarters building on the site after then-mayor Lee P. Brown in recognition of his advocacy for the light rail line.

The station, along with the Red Line as a whole, was opened on January 1, 2004. At the end of the same year, METRO began moving offices to the building, starting with the METRO RideStore.

In 2021, METRO began adding bus-only lanes along Travis Street and Milam Street leading to and from the transit center.
