= Burnett Transit Center =

Rail station in Houston, Texas

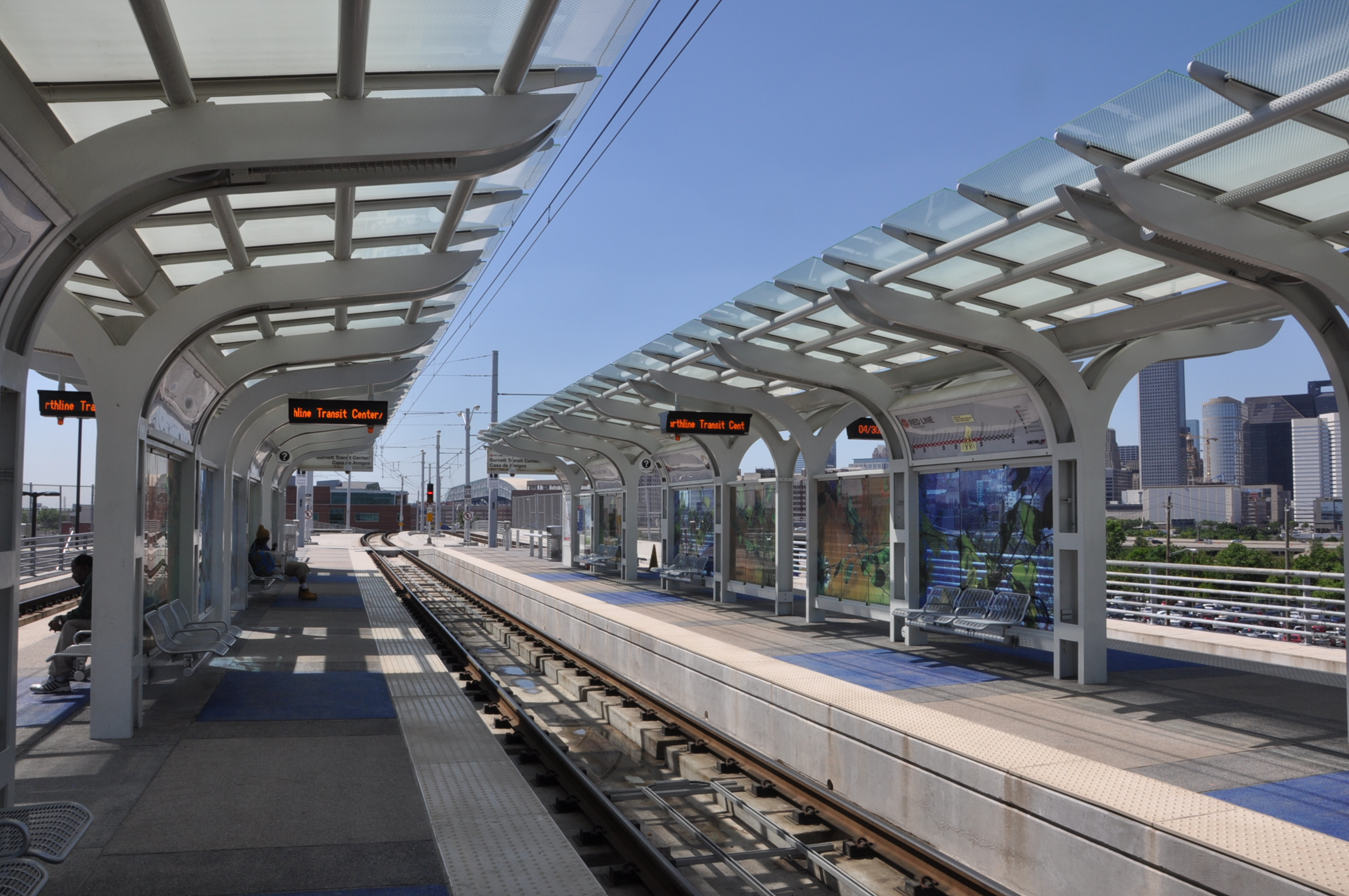

General information
- Location: North Main Street near Burnett Street; Houston, Texas; USA
- Coordinates: 29°46′20″N 95°21′34″W
- Owner: METRO
- Line: Red Line
- Platforms: 2 island platforms
- Tracks: 3
- Connections: METRO Community Connector: Near Northside Zone

Construction
- Accessible: Yes

History
- Opened: December 21, 2013; 12 years ago

Passengers
- June 2026: 538 (avg. weekday ridership)

Services
Preceding station	METRORail	Following station
UH–Downtown toward Fannin South	Red Line	Quitman/Near Northside toward Northline Transit Center/HCC
Location

The Burnett Transit Center is an elevated light rail station on the METRORail Red Line in Houston, Texas, United States. It was built as part of the North/Red Line Extension, and opened on December 21, 2013.

It has three tracks accessed by two island platforms, one for each direction (the Spanish solution). The center track is used by northbound trains short-turning to return southbound. These trains unload passengers onto the eastern (northbound) platform, and load passengers from the western (southbound) platform.

The station features a six-bay bus terminal and a "Kiss and Ride" facility at ground level.

The station is located above the intersection of North Main Street and Burnett Street, which was once proposed for a multimodal transit hub prior to 2011.

== Bus connections ==
- 3 Langley-Little York
- 51 Hardy-Kelley
- 52 Hardy-Ley
- 79 Irvington
