= Southwest Rail Corridor =

Commuter rail line serving southwestern Houston

90A/Southwest Rail Corridor

Overview
- Status: Proposed
- Locale: Missouri City and Southwest Houston
- Termini: Fannin South; Missouri City
- Stations: 4

Service
- Type: Commuter Rail
- Operator(s): Metropolitan Transit Authority of Harris County

Technical
- Character: Elevated and surface-level
- Track gauge: 4 ft 8 1/2 in (1,435 mm)

The Southwest Rail Corridor (SWRC) was a proposed commuter rail line in the southwestern Houston area. The line was planned to connect Missouri City to METRORail's current Fannin South where it would merge with METRORail's Red line, eventually ending at Wheeler.

== History ==
The project started in January 2011, with METRO initiating an Environmental Impact Statement. Their preliminary study stated that the population in both Harris County and Fort Bend County would continue to grow, and thus there would be more commuters going to central Houston. It identified the area with most commuters from Fort Bend County as the Texas Medical Center with 24,000 daily trips, accounting for 33% of the total work trips. The number of daily trips was expected to reach 32,000 by 2035.

On 28 September 2012, METRO paused work on the SWRC project "to reassess investment priorities in the region via the Transit Re-imagining Plan". On 18 May 2015, John Culberson announced an agreement with the METRO chairman Gilbert Garcia which would "[prioritize] the development of commuter rail for the US 90A/Southwest Rail Corridor".

On 14 December 2018 the METRONext Moving Forward Plan was announced which contained a number of proposed investments. Among these was a route to Sugar Land via Missouri City, which is similar to the previously proposed SWRC route. As of 2024, this new route is still featured on the METRO website, where it is described as a "future METRORail potential partnership".

== Rolling Stock ==
The original proposal considered light rail, electric locomotive, or diesel locomotive trains. The 2018 METRONext plan proposes a similar route using light rail transit.
