= METRO Q Card =

Public transit smart card used in Houston, Texas

- Location: Greater Houston, Texas, United States
- Launched: 2008
- Discontinued: 2026
- Operator: Metropolitan Transit Authority of Harris County
- Manager: Metropolitan Transit Authority of Harris County
- Currency: USD
- Stored-value: Cash value
- Credit expiry: After card/ticket expiration date
- Auto recharge: Automatic replenishment
- Validity: METRORail; METRO Bus; METROLift; Metro Park & Ride; MetroRapid; Metro Curb2Curb
- Retailed: Online; Telephone; Selected resellers; Train stations

The METRO Q Card was a contactless smart card used to ride on public transportation in Greater Houston. It was developed by Affiliated Computer Services, and administered by the Metropolitan Transit Authority of Harris County. The card was used on METRO Bus, METRORail, and METROLift. The cards are based upon the MIFARE Classic 1K standard and are freely available but expire.

In December 2025, Metro introduced the new RideMETRO card, which functions the same way as the Q Card but gives out only a free local ride per 10 paid ones. It previously was five free per 50.
