= Houston Metro =

Major public transportation agency the United States

METRO

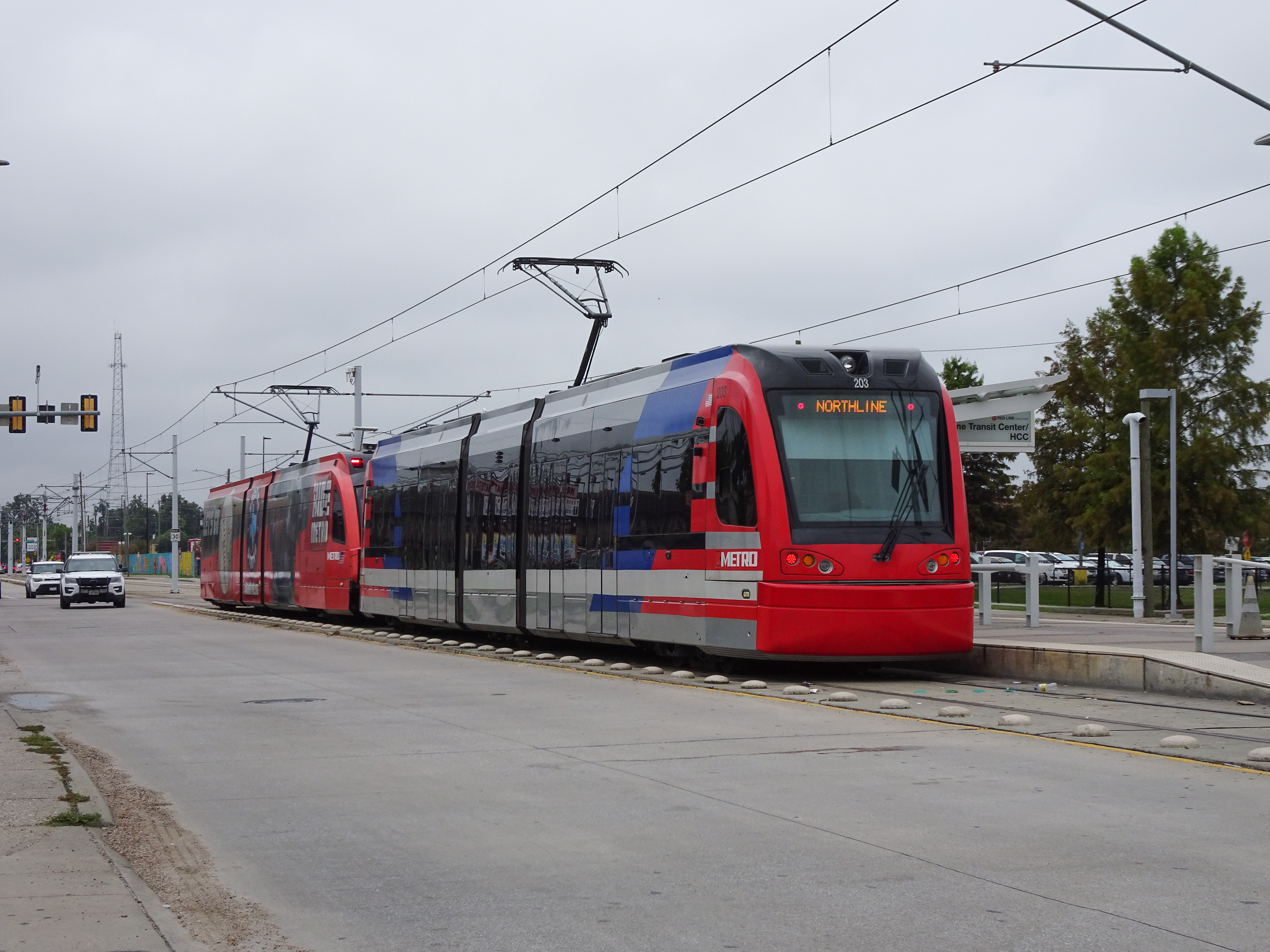
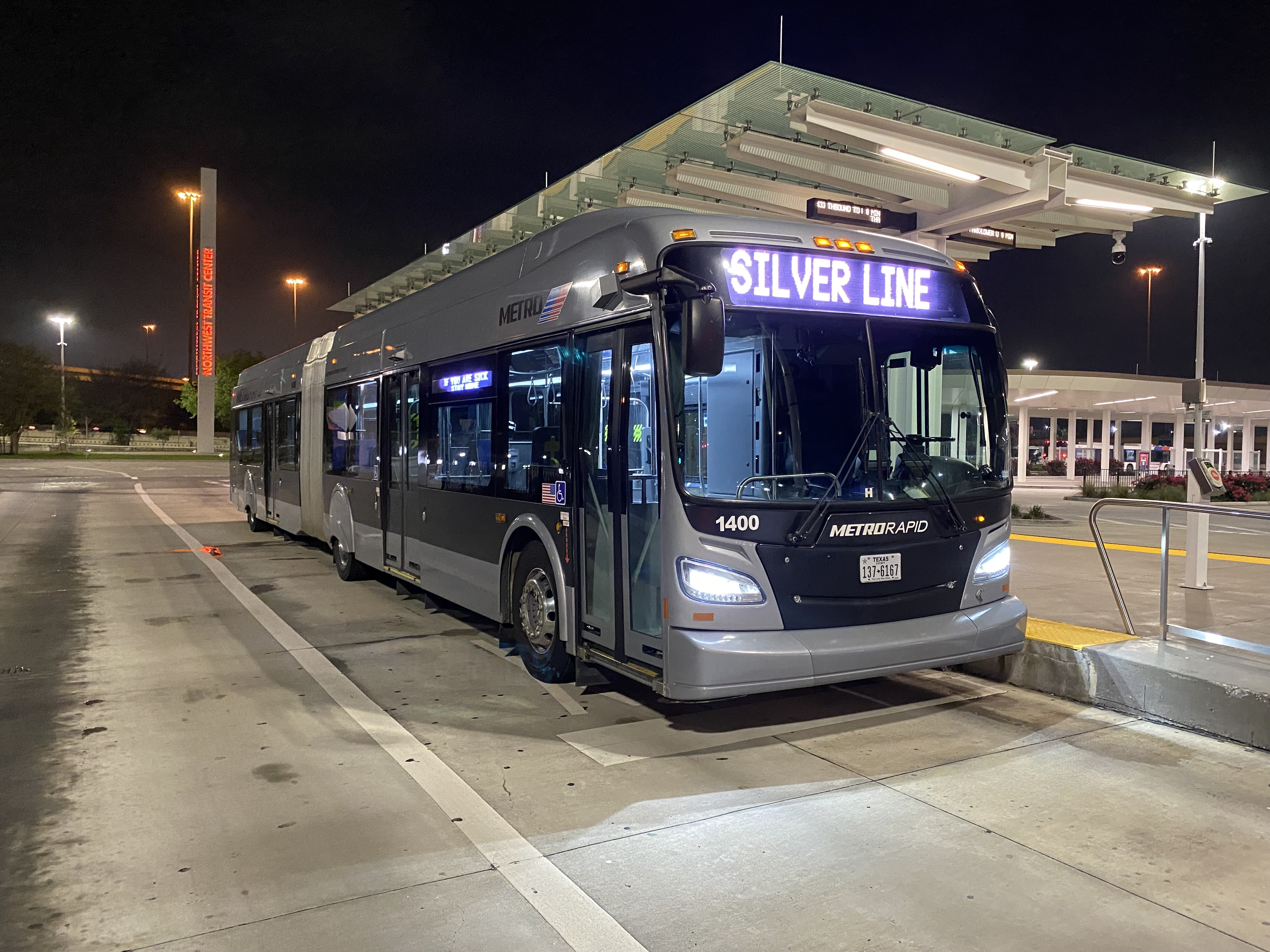
- METRO services: METRORail and METRORapid (bus rapid transit)

Overview
- Locale: Houston, Texas, U.S.
- Transit type: Bus, light rail, paratransit, express lanes
- Number of lines: 83 local bus routes 31 commuter bus routes 3 light rail lines 1 community connector 1 bus rapid transit line
- Number of stations: 44 (light rail); 12 (bus rapid transit); 27 (park and rides); 21 (transit centers)
- Daily ridership: 251,800 (weekdays, Q2 2026)
- Annual ridership: 77,996,900 (2025)
- Headquarters: 1900 Main St. Lee P. Brown Administration Building; Downtown Houston, Texas
- Website: ridemetro.org

Operation
- Began operation: January 1, 1979 (47 years ago)
- Number of vehicles: 1,233 (bus); 76 (light rail)

The Metropolitan Transit Authority of Harris County, branded as METRO, is a major public transportation agency based in Houston, Texas, United States. It operates bus, light rail, bus rapid transit, HOV and HOT lanes, and paratransit service (under the name METROLift) in the city as well as most of Harris County. It also operates bus service to Missouri City in Fort Bend County and previously operated to Conroe in Montgomery County. The Metro headquarters are in the Lee P. Brown Administration Building in Downtown Houston. In 2025, the system had a ridership of 77,996,900, or about 251,800 per weekday as of the second quarter of 2026.

== History ==
The Texas State Legislature authorized the creation of local transit authorities in 1973. In 1978, Houston-area voters created Metro and approved a one-cent sales tax to support its operations. Metro opened for business in January 1979, taking over the bus service owned by the City of Houston known as HouTran. HouTran was plagued by outdated equipment, infrequent service and a route structure which failed to account for Houston's rapid population growth.

Metro's service area encompasses 1,285 square miles (3,330 km^{2}) and also serves portions of an eight-county region with its vanpool service; the agency employs about 3,800 people.

=== Executive leadership ===
Tom Jasien is the current president and CEO of the agency, since December 2023.

Previously, Thomas Lambert held the position for a decade, being formally appointed in February 2014, although he had been operating as the agency's interim CEO since the beginning of 2013. Lambert, a Houston native with a political science degree from Southwest Texas State University and master's in public administration from the University of Houston, joined Metro as a security investigator in 1979. He was named agency police chief in 1982, ultimately overseeing close to 100 officers, then moved into higher ranks of management.

The Metro Board has nine members – five are appointed by the Mayor and confirmed by Houston City Council, two are appointed by Harris County Commissioners Court, and two are appointed by the 14 mayors of Metro's smaller city members.

== METRORail ==
Metro's light rail service is known as METRORail.

Metro offers a trip planner on its web site that provides information for public transit in the region it serves. It is multi-modal, combining schedule information for buses and rail. Riders enter their intended origin and destination, along with optional time, date, the trip planner displays, itineraries showing the stops, departure and arrival times, times to get from the origin to the destination and other information.

Today, the average daily weekday ridership is 59,753 and 18.3 million annually. On November 9, 2007, Metro surpassed its 40 million boardings mark, something it did not expect to happen until 2020. Notable records in ridership have occurred on the following dates:

- February 1, 2004: 64,005 passengers rode Metro during Super Bowl XXXVIII
- February 23, 2004: 54,193 passenger boardings were recorded, the highest weekday at the time
- February 27, 2007: 56,388 passengers were recorded the day of the Houston Livestock Show and Rodeo
- February 4, 2017: 109,417 passengers were recorded during festivities preceding Super Bowl LI.
- November 3, 2017: 125,000 passengers were recorded the day of the parade for the Houston Astros, champions of the 2017 World Series.

=== Lines ===
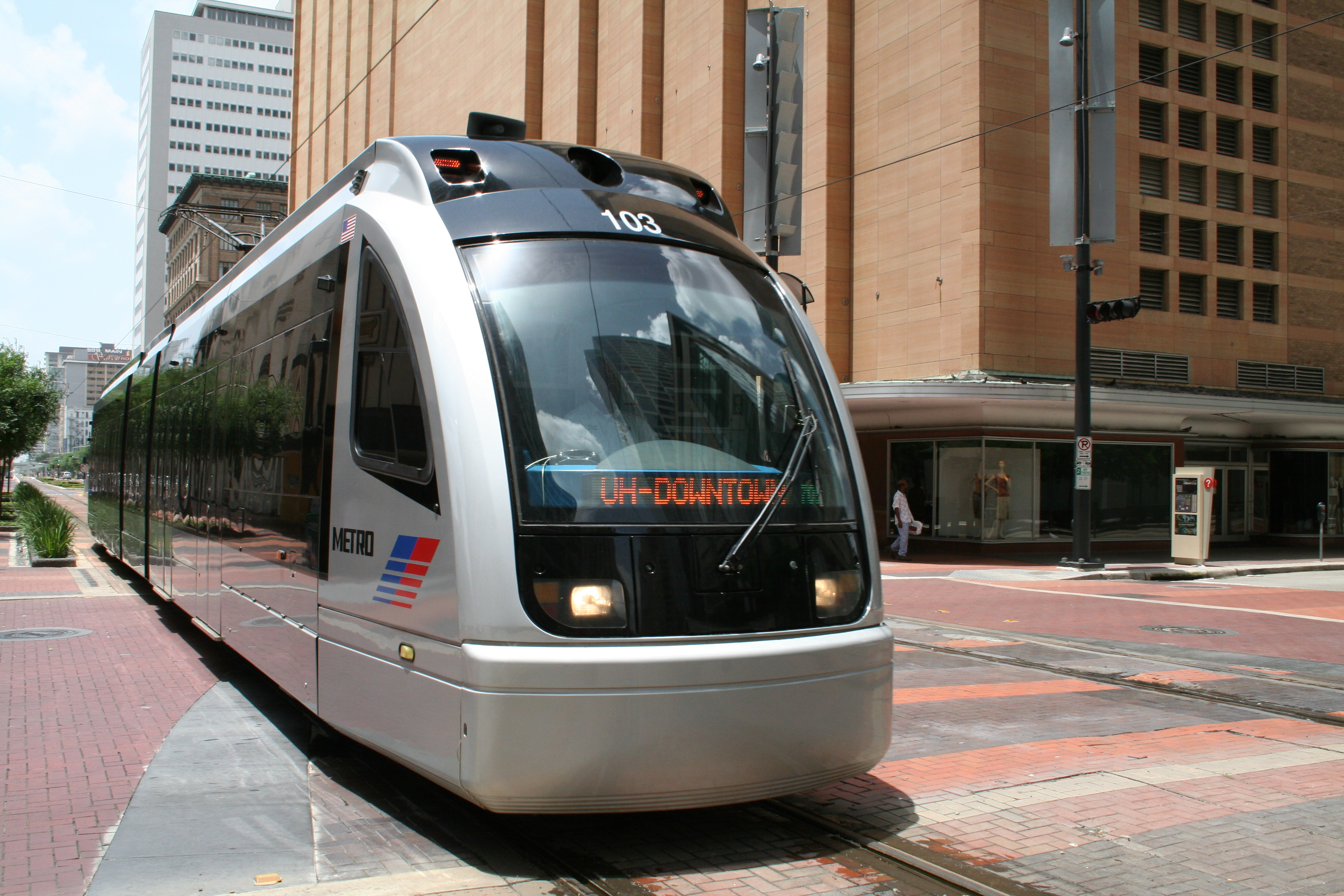
The Red Line along Main Street

Line	Distance	Route	Status
Red Line	12.6 mi (20.3 km)	Fannin South to Northline Transit Center/HCC	Opened January 1, 2004
Purple Line	6.7 mi (10.8 km)	Smith Street in Downtown Houston to Palm Center	Opened May 23, 2015
Green Line	3.2 mi (5.1 km)	Smith Street in Downtown Houston to Magnolia Park Transit Center	Opened May 23, 2015

Metro currently operates three light rail lines: the Red Line, Purple Line and Green Line. The Red Line, the Authority's first light rail line, began operation on January 1, 2004. Now extended to 12.8 miles, the line begins at the Northline Transit Center/HCC, serving HCC Northeast and Northline Commons mall, and then continues south through Houston's Central Business District, Midtown, the Museum District, Rice University, the Texas Medical Center and the NRG Park Complex to the Fannin South Transit Center It is the second major light rail service in Texas following the DART system. The arrival of Metro light rail comes approximately sixty years after the previous streetcar system was shut down, which left Houston as the largest city in the United States without a rail system since 1990, when Los Angeles' Blue Line opened.

Metro opened two additional light rail lines in 2015, the Purple (Southeast) and Green (East End) Lines. Destinations served by these new lines include Texas Southern University, the University of Houston, PNC Stadium, and the Theater District. These new lines added another 9.9 miles of light rail. In total, Metro operates 22.7 miles of light rail service. Metro will reach approximately 18.6 million light rail boardings in FY17.

Two other lines were to be completed by 2012, but funding issues dropped the number to the northern extension of the Red Line and two of the original four new lines. The extension of the Red Line was opened on December 21, 2013 and the East End/Green Line opened on May 23, 2015. Due to federal investigations and the lack of funds, the plans may degenerate further. Three of the five lines were previously going to be bus rapid transit (BRT), but due to high ridership possibilities, the decision was made to make them all light rail.

=== Expansion ===
METRO put the METRONext Moving Forward Plan before Houston area voters in November 2019; voters approved the $3.5 billion bond by a margin of nearly two-to-one. Bonds issued will be used to extend existing light rail service. The Red Line will be expanded North to the North Shepherd park & ride, and both the Green and Purple lines will be expanded east and south to William P Hobby Airport, and west to the Houston Municipal Courthouse.

A long extension or possible commuter rail line from Fannin South to Sugar Land and beyond has been studied since 2004. The route would parallel U.S. 90A in the existing right-of-way used by the Glidden subdivision owned by UP. In 2011, the Southwest Rail Corridor was proposed to connect Fannin South and Missouri City. This was not constructed, but the METRONext plan includes a similar route extended to Sugar Land which it describes as a "future METRORail potential partnership."

== METRORapid (bus rapid transit - BRT) ==
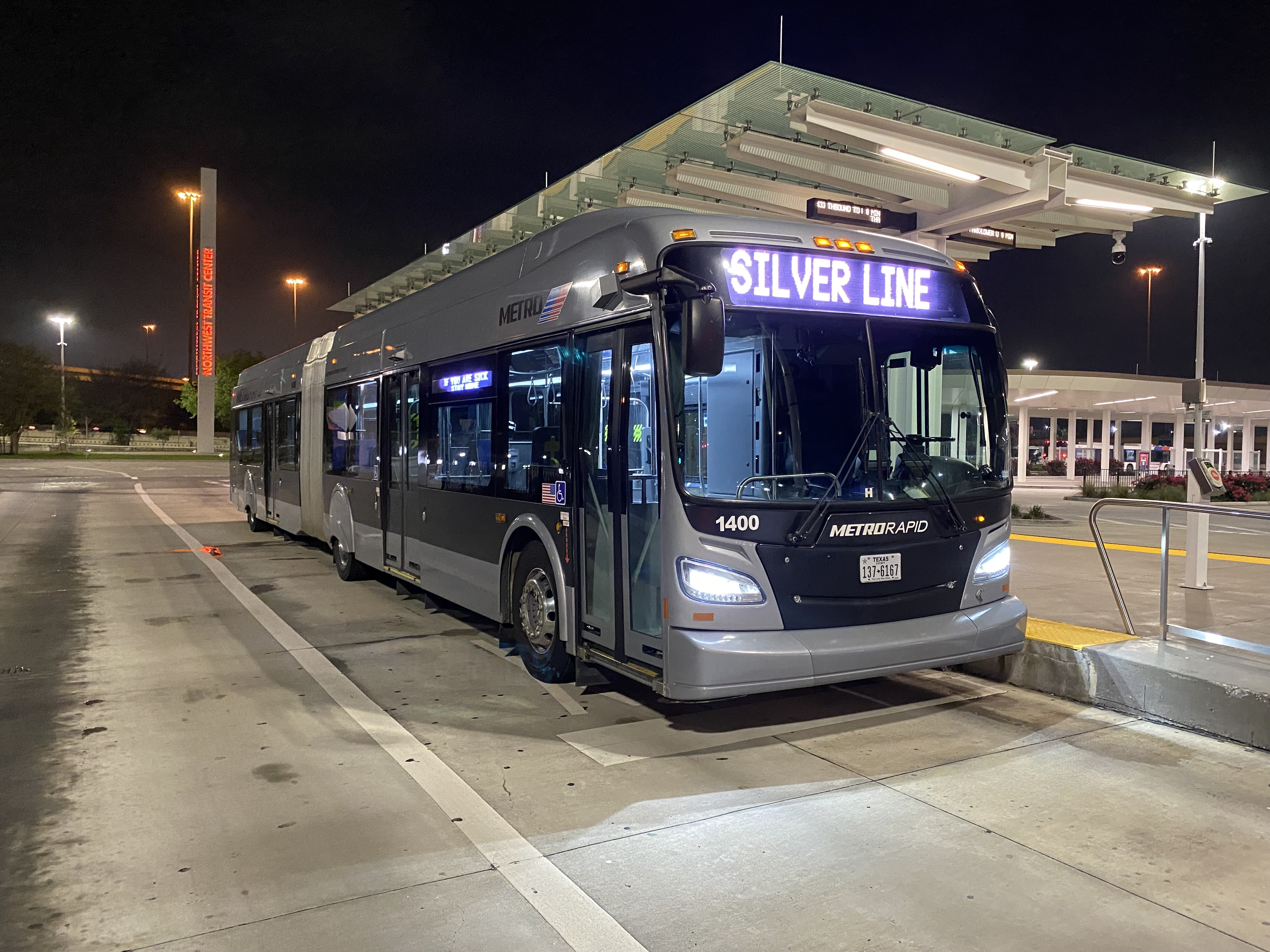
Silver Line bus at the Northwest Transit Center

The METRORapid Silver Line is currently METRO's only operational bus rapid transit (BRT) line. It opened on August 23, 2020, and connects the Uptown area with the Northwest Transit Center, offering dedicated bus lanes over nearly the entire length of the corridor. The line spans 4.7 miles (7.6 km), offering a fast and efficient service that is part of METRO's broader effort to enhance public transportation in Houston.

=== Lines ===
Line	Distance	Route	Status
Silver Line	4.7 mi (7.6 km)	Westpark/Lower Uptown Transit Center to Northwest Transit Center	Opened August 23, 2020
University Line	11.3 mi (18.2 km)	Hillcroft Transit Center to Tidwell Transit Center	Indefinitely postponed
I-10 Inner Katy Line	4 mi (6.4 km)	Northwest Transit Center to St. Emanuel Street in the East Downtown (EaDo) area	Under review
Silver Line extension	Approx. 4.1 mi (6.6 km)	Extension to the Gulfton area in southwest Houston	Under review

==== Planned and paused lines ====
===== University Line =====
The University Line, initially planned to begin construction in 2025 and open in 2029, was set to span 11.3 miles (18.2 km) from Hillcroft Transit Center to Tidwell Transit Center, traveling through major corridors in central Houston. However, in June 2024, METRO announced the indefinite postponement or abandonment of the University Line due to financial and political challenges. This line was once a cornerstone of METRO's expansion plans and was included in the METRONext plan for future development.

===== Inner Katy Line =====
The Inner Katy BRT line, which was initially intended to run along I-10 from the Northwest Transit Center to downtown Houston, has faced significant changes. Due to funding issues and project re-evaluations, the line has been scaled back, with plans now calling for the use of shared HOV lanes rather than dedicated BRT lanes. The completion timeline for this line remains unclear, although $8.7 million has been allocated for FY2025.

===== Gulfton Line (Silver Line extension) =====
The Gulfton BRT, an extension of the Silver Line serving the dense Gulfton area in southwest Houston, is also under review. While there has been no formal announcement regarding the line's construction status, project pages were removed from METRO's website in April 2024, sparking speculation that the line may be delayed or cancelled.

==== Expansion and future plans ====
As part of the original vision for METRORapid, several new BRT lines were planned to follow corridors originally designated for light rail transit. These include:

- Expansion to Inner Katy and University corridors (now proposed as BRT instead of light rail)
- A new north-south BRT service along the western leg of Beltway 8
- A line bridging the gap between the northern terminus of the Red Line and Bush Intercontinental Airport.

Together, these lines were expected to form part of a 75-mile network of BRT services, all branded as METRORapid. However, with the recent setbacks to key lines, the future of this expanded BRT network is uncertain.

== METROBus ==
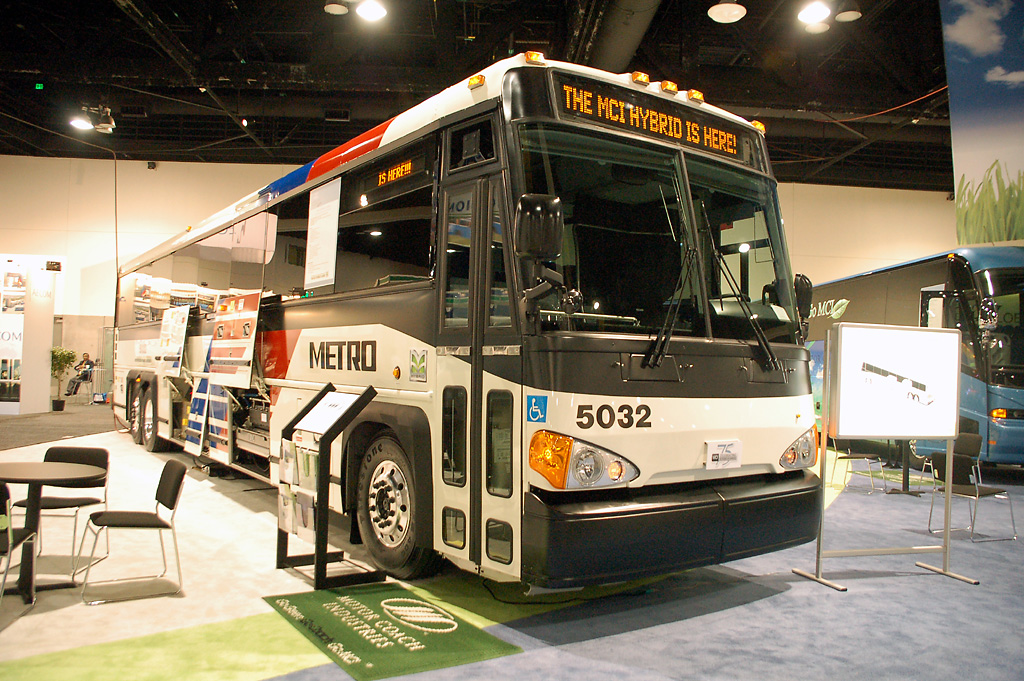
New Hybrid Bus in Houston Metro livery by Motor Coach Industries D4500CTH

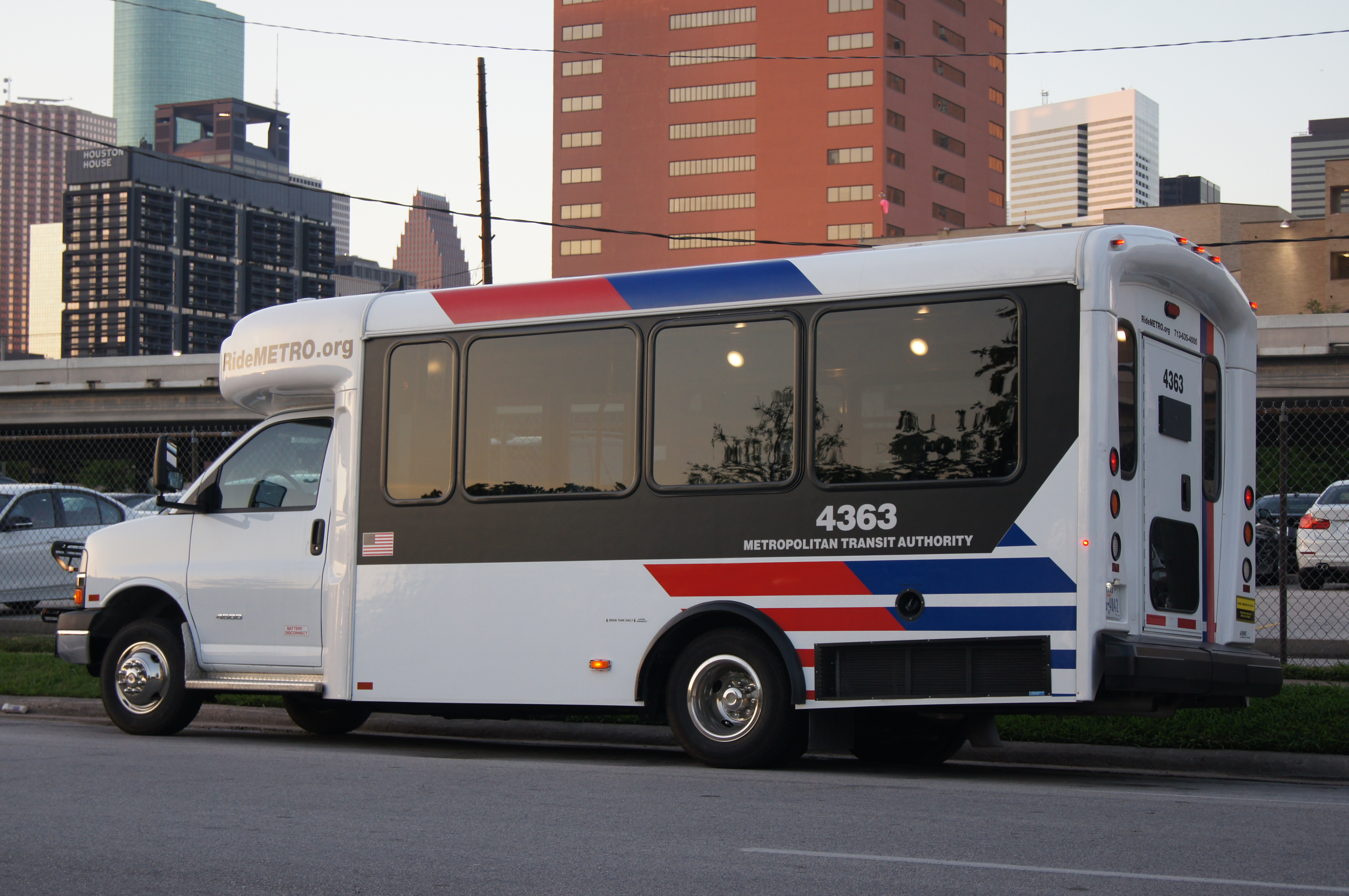
METRO bus for routes with low ridership.

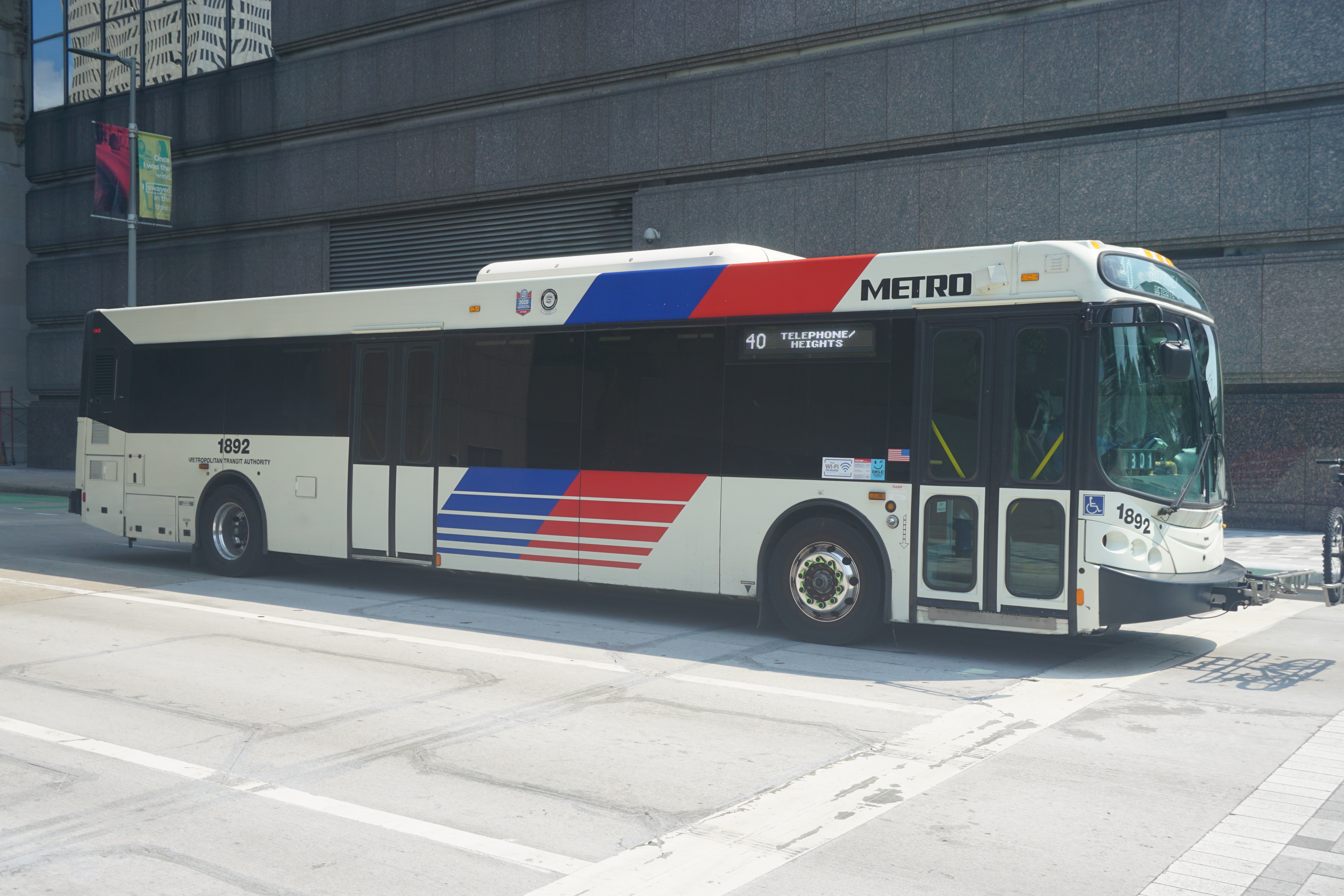
METRO bus in 2022

Metro's local bus service usually runs on city streets, typically stopping at every other corner along its entire route. The bus system is the most used in Texas and the Southwest region. Metro also operates express bus routes on the Houston region's freeway high-occupancy vehicle lanes, which stop at park-and-ride lots.

Prior to the construction of Metrorail, Metro consisted of the largest all-bus fleet in the United States, only because Houston was the largest major city devoid of any rail transit since 1990.

Circa 1991 bus services for handicapped people were implemented.

In 2015, the bus system was redesigned, eliminating low-ridership routes in favor of a high-frequency, high-demand bus network. This change was accomplished without any increase in operating costs.

=== Service types ===
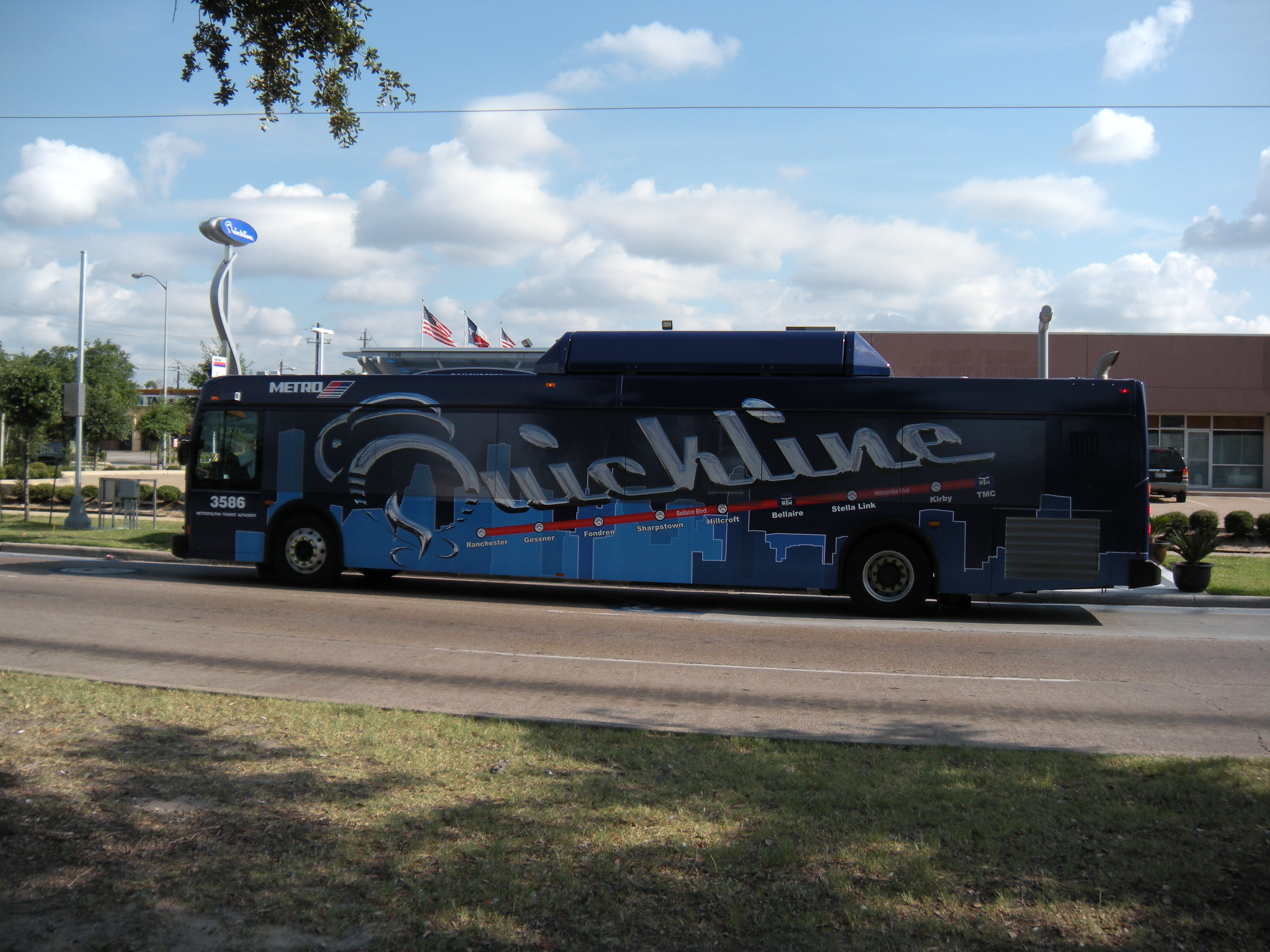
Metro Quickline

- Local: Most Metro buses typically operate on city streets, with the majority of routes serving several of Houston's major employment centers. The routes are grid-like "crosstown" routes that travel from one part of the city to another, typically without entering downtown. Many routes were truncated to METRORail stations to eliminate duplicate service.
- Express: A local limited stop service that serves key destinations but travel nonstop on freeway segments. They were formerly categorized as Limited prior to the 2015 restructuring of bus routes.
- Park and Ride (Commuter): Metro operates express service between major destinations and outlying areas via high-occupancy vehicle lanes on regional freeways. Buses on these routes stop at park-and-ride lots, which also serve as transit centers.
- Bus Rapid Transit (BRT): A pilot program introduced on June 1, 2009, to provide faster service with upgraded buses and fewer, more modern stops to busy corridors, beginning with a supplement of Route 2 (Bellaire), 402 Quickline Bellaire BRT. The second route in this system was a replacement of Route 33 (Post Oak), 433 Silver Line Post Oak BRT, which unlike Route 402, utilizes an exclusive busway for a majority of the route. The next planned line was the University Line, which was planned to start construction in 2025 and open in 2029. However, in June 2024, Metro announced that they had abandoned plans for the University Line. In February 2026, route 402 was discontinued, leaving the 433 as the sole BRT route.

=== Routes ===
Metro's bus routes are numbered based on their service type and arranged in a grid. On August 24, 2015, Metro revamped their entire bus network with new routes and frequent service. Under the new network, all local routes run 7 days a week with the exception of two express routes.

Metro provided the free Greenlink shuttle services in Downtown Houston, but discontinued the service in March 2020 due to the COVID-19 pandemic.

Metro's express and commuter buses consist of 45-foot (14 m) MCI and New Flyer "Viking" buses, which have reclining seats, small individual lights, as well as small air conditioning vents for each seat. Viking buses went out of service in May 2015. In 2025, the bus system had a ridership of 63,315,900, or about 206,900 per weekday as of the second quarter of 2026.

==== List of routes ====
- 2–99: Local routes
- 102–162: Express routes
- 202–298: Park and Ride routes
- 309–399: Shuttle and curb2curb routes
- 433: Bus rapid transit (BRT) route
- **Red** indicates 15 minute-or-better frequencies
- **Blue** indicates 15–30 minute frequencies
- **Green** indicates 30–60 minute frequencies
- **Yellow** indicates express bus routes
- **Gray** indicates Park & Ride express routes or shuttles with no defined frequency
- **Coral** indicates BRT (bus rapid transit) routes

Multiple colors indicate that portions of the route have different frequencies from one another.

Route #	Route Name	Terminal 1	Terminal 2	via	Length	Ridership (FY 2026)	Notes
2	Bellaire	**Texas Medical Center**; TMC Transit Center	**Juniper Point**; Mission Bend Transit Center	Bellaire Blvd (Holcombe Blvd)	14.3 miles (23.0 km)	2,230,604	
3	Langley-Little York	**Fairbanks/Northwest Crossing**; Hollister Street & Little York Road	**Northside Village**; Burnett Transit Center	W Little York Rd	27.2 miles (43.8 km)	791,750	
4	Beechnut	**Greater Eastwood**; Eastwood Transit Center	**Juniper Point**; Mission Bend Transit Center	Beechnut St, N Braeswood Blvd	22.3 miles (35.9 km)	2,534,973	
5	Southmore	**Midtown**; Wheeler Transit Center	**Allendale**; Flagstone Terrace and South Richey Street	Southmore Blvd, Griggs Rd, Long Dr	14.8 miles (23.8 km)	369,078	
6	Jensen/Greens	**Downtown**; Downtown Transit Center	**Greater Greenspoint**; Greenspoint Transit Center	Jensen Dr, Greens Rd	25.6 miles (41.2 km)	1,284,374	
7	West Airport	**Willow Meadows**; West Loop Transit Center	**Greater Fondren Southwest**; Fondren Meadow Drive & Gessner Road	S Willow Dr, Airport Blvd	6.3 miles (10.1 km)	261,198	
8	West Bellfort	**South Main**; Fannin South Transit Center	**Greater Fondren Southwest**; West Bellfort Park and Ride	Bellfort Avenue (West)	10.3 miles (16.6 km)	1,047,637	
9	Gulfton/Holman	**Greater Eastwood**; Eastwood Transit Center	**Sharpstown**; Bonhomme Road & Clarewood Drive	Holman St, US 59, Gulfton St	15.5 miles (24.9 km)	700,663	
10	Willowbend	**Texas Medical Center**; TMC Transit Center	**Greater Fondren Southwest**; Sandpiper Drive & Willowbend Boulevard	Holcombe Blvd, Stella Link Rd, Willowbend Blvd	9.1 miles (14.6 km)	204,735	
11	Almeda/Lyons	**Central Southwest**; Hiram Clarke Transit Center	**Northshore**; Dividend Street & Currency Street	Almeda Rd, Lyons Av	21.6 miles (34.8 km)	792,283	
14	Hiram Clarke	**Texas Medical Center**; TMC Transit Center	**Central Southwest**; Hiram Clarke Transit Center	Main St, Hiram Clarke Rd	9.5 miles (15.3 km)	621,673	
20	Canal/Memorial	**Bellaire**; Chimney Rock Road & Bellaire Boulevard	**Magnolia Park**; Magnolia Park Transit Center	S Rice Av, Memorial Dr (East), Canal St	18.7 miles (30.1 km)	865,901	
23	Clay/West 43rd	**Northline**; Northline Transit Center/HCC	**Spring Branch Central**; Pitner Road & Roma Street	Crosstimbers, West 43rd St, Clay Road	9.1 miles (14.6 km)	149,705	
25	Richmond	**Greater Eastwood**; Eastwood Transit Center	**Westchase**; Meadowglen Lane & Hayes Road	Wheeler Ave, Richmond Ave	17.8 miles (28.6 km)	2,158,660	
25	Richmond	**Greater Eastwood**; Eastwood Transit Center	**Juniper Point**; Mission Bend Transit Center	Wheeler Ave, Richmond Ave	20.9 miles (33.6 km)	2,158,660	
26	Long Point/Cavalcade	**Houston Gardens**; Kashmere Transit Center	**Memorial City**; Memorial City Way & Barryknoll Lane	Cavalcade St (East 20th St), West 18th St, Long Point Rd	17.4 miles (28.0 km)	1,167,476	
27	Shepherd	**Texas Medical Center**; TMC Transit Center	**Acres Homes**; North Shepherd Park and Ride	Greenbriar Dr (SB), Durham Dr (SB), Shepherd Dr	13 miles (21 km)	797,751	
28	OST – Wayside	**South Central Houston**; Ben Taub Hospital	**Greater Fifth Ward**; 5th Ward/Denver Harbor Transit Center	Old Spanish Trail, Wayside Drive	13.8 miles (22.2 km)	934,351	
29	Cullen/Hirsch	**Houston Gardens**; Kashmere Transit Center	**Crestmont Park**; MLK Jr. Boulevard & Madden Lane	Hirsch Rd, Cullen Blvd	17.8 miles (28.6 km)	1,119,096	
30	Clinton/Ella	**Acres Homes**; North Shepherd Park and Ride	**Clinton Park**; Mississippi Street & Clinton Drive	Wheatley St (Ella Blvd), E 11th St, Clinton Dr	20.8 miles (33.5 km)	265,849	
32	Renwick	**Mid West**; Winsome Lane & Fountain View Drive	**Willow Meadows**; West Loop Transit Center	Renwick Dr	7 miles (11 km)	480,274	
35	San Felipe	**Mid West**; Winsome Lane & Fountain View Drive	**Downtown**; Pierce Street & Travis Street	W Gray St, San Felipe St	10 miles (16 km)	130,704	
36	Kempwood	**Houston Gardens**; Kashmere Transit Center	**Westbranch**; Westway Park Boulevard & Clay Road	Kempwood Dr (East 34th St), Crosstimbers St	19.3 miles (31.1 km)	1,009,694	
38	Manchester-Lawndale	**Magnolia Park**; Magnolia Park Transit Center	**Harrisburg/Manchester**; Manchester Docks	Lawndale St	6.2 miles (10.0 km)	43,759	
39	Katy Freeway	**Spring Branch Central**; Northwest Transit Center	**Memorial City**; Britoak Lane & Yorkchester Drive	Katy Freeway Service Road	10.8 miles (17.4 km)	91,752	
40	Telephone/Heights	**Acres Homes**; North Shepherd Park and Ride	**Meadowbrook/Allendale**; Monroe Park & Ride	Yale St, Heights Blvd, Polk St, Telephone Rd	25.9 miles (41.7 km)	1,254,326	Interlined with 41 from Waugh Dr to Eastwood TC
41	Kirby/Polk	**Greater Eastwood**; Eastwood Transit Center	**Texas Medical Center**; TMC Transit Center	Polk St, W Dallas St, Kirby Dr	13 miles (21 km)	443,238	Interlined with 40 from Waugh Dr to Eastwood TC
44	Acres Homes	**Downtown**; Pierce Street & Main Street	**Cypress Crossing**; Lone Star College-University Park	N Main St, Montgomery Rd, Tomball Pkwy (SH 249)	23.1 miles (37.2 km)	855,638	
45	Tidwell	**Brookhollow West**; West Little York Park and Ride	**East Houston**; Mesa Transit Center	Tidwell Rd	19.1 miles (30.7 km)	1,457,803	
46	Gessner	**Brookhollow West**; West Little York Park and Ride	**Greater Fondren Southwest**; Fondren Meadow Drive & Gessner Road	Gessner Rd	16.3 miles (26.2 km)	2,165,503	
47	Hillcroft	**Spring Branch East**; Northwest Transit Center	**Westbury**; Greencraig Drive & Hillcroft Avenue	Woodway Dr, Voss Rd (Hillcroft Ave)	12.8 miles (20.6 km)	1,167,683	
48	Market	**Downtown**; Preston Street & Smith Street	**Pleasantville**; Pleasantville Drive & Market Street	Market St	8.6 miles (13.8 km)	176,939	Pleasantville routing alters during AM or PM
49	Chimney Rock/S. Post Oak	**Spring Branch East**; Northwest Transit Center	**Ridgemont**; Court Road & South Post Oak Road	Chimney Rock Rd, Bering Dr, S Post Oak Rd	17.3 miles (27.8 km)	839,189	
50	Broadway	**Greater Eastwood**; Eastwood Transit Center	**Hobby Transit Center**	Broadway St, Polk St	9.6 miles (15.4 km)	707,925	
51	Hardy – Kelley	**Downtown**; Downtown Transit Center	**Kashmere Gardens**; Lyndon B. Johnson General Hospital	Hardy/Elysian Sts, Kelley St	7.8 miles (12.6 km)	216,290	Interlined with 52 from Downtown TC to Kashmere TC
52	Hardy – Ley	**Downtown**; Downtown Transit Center	**East Houston**; Mesa Transit Center	Hardy/Elysian Sts, Ley Rd, Hirsch Rd	19.3 miles (31.1 km)	625,376	Interlined with 51 from Downtown TC to Kashmere TC
54	Scott	**Downtown**; Downtown Transit Center	**Central Southwest**; Hiram Clarke Transit Center	Scott St, Almeda Genoa Rd	14.2 miles (22.9 km)	1,982,095	
56	Airline/Montrose	**Northline**; Northline Transit Center/HCC	**Greenspoint**; Greenspoint Transit Center	Airline Drive	11.4 miles (18.3 km)	1,808,227	
56	Airline/Montrose	**Texas Medical Center**; TMC Transit Center	**Greenspoint**; Greenspoint Transit Center	Airline Dr, Studewood St (Montrose Bl)	21.6 miles (34.8 km)	1,808,227	
58	Hammerly	**Spring Branch East**; Northwest Transit Center	**Westbranch**; Westway Park Boulevard & Capital Park Drive	Hammerly Blvd	10.8 miles (17.4 km)	150,559	
59	Aldine Mail	**Acres Homes**; North Shepherd Park and Ride	**Eastex**; Aldine Mail Route & US Route 59	Aldine Mail Route Road	11.7 miles (18.8 km)	118,709	
60	Cambridge	**Texas Medical Center**; TMC Transit Center	**Astrodome Area**; El Camino Street & Holly Hall Street	Cambridge St, Holly Hall St	4.4 miles (7.1 km)	463,656	
60	Cambridge	**Texas Medical Center**; TMC Transit Center	**South Union**; Southeast Transit Center	Cambridge St, Holly Hall St, Tierwester St	6.8 miles (10.9 km)	463,656	
63	Fondren	**Mid West**; Old Farm Road & Westheimer Road	**Fondren Gardens**; Fondren Transit Center	Fondren Rd	9.6 miles (15.4 km)	1,451,803	
65	Bissonnet	**Midtown**; Wheeler Transit Center	**Crescent Park Village**; Beckford Drive & Newbrook Layover	Bissonnet St	15.5 miles (24.9 km)	1,848,786	
66	Quitman	**Spring Branch East**; Northwest Transit Center	**Greater Fifth Ward**; 5th Ward/Denver Harbor Transit Center	White Oak Dr (Quitman St)	12.6 miles (20.3 km)	123,848	Was 66 Studewood before the 2015 route change
67	Dairy Ashford	**Alief**; Dairy View Lane & Bissonnet Street	**Addicks Park Ten**; Addicks Park & Ride	Dairy Ashford Rd (Park Row Drive)	9.9 miles (15.9 km)	191,505	
68	Braeswood	**Texas Medical Center**; TMC Transit Center	**Alief**; Elmsworth Drive & South Course Drive (other times)	Braeswood Blvd	11.8 miles (19.0 km)	598,369	
68	Braeswood	**Texas Medical Center**; TMC Transit Center	**Alief**; El Franco Lee Clinic (weekday daytime)	Braeswood Blvd	13.8 miles (22.2 km)	598,369	Was 68 Brays Bayou but renamed in the 2015 New Bus Network
70	Memorial	**Spring Branch Central**; Northwest Transit Center	**Spring Branch West**; Business Center Drive & Westview Circle Drive	Memorial Dr (Central)	11.7 miles (18.8 km)	66,698	
72	Westview	**Spring Branch Central**; Northwest Transit Center	**Spring Branch West**; Business Center Drive & Westview Circle Drive	Westview Dr	10.1 miles (16.3 km)	110,247	
73	Bellfort	**South Main**; Fannin South Transit Center	**Hobby Transit Center**	Bellfort Avenue (East)	9.4 miles (15.1 km)	1,519,636	
75	Eldridge	**Addicks Park Ten**; Addicks Park & Ride	**Eldridge/West Oaks**; West Oaks Mall	Eldridge Pkwy	13.9 miles (22.4 km)	245,503	
76	Evergreen	**Magnolia Park**; Magnolia Park Transit Center	**Allendale**; Howard Drive & Sweetbriar Street	Evergreen Dr, Winkler Dr	10.7 miles (17.2 km)	427,297	
77	Homestead	**Greater Fifth Ward**; 5th Ward/Denver Harbor Transit Center	**Homestead**; Hartwick Road & Homestead Road	Homestead Rd	10.9 miles (17.5 km)	157,085	
78	Wayside	**Greater Fifth Ward**; 5th Ward/Denver Harbor Transit Center	**East Houston**; Brock Park Drive & Tidwell Road	Wayside Dr	9.7 miles (15.6 km)	166,681	
79	Irvington	**Northside Village**; Burnett Transit Center	**Eastex-Jensen**; Aldine Westfield Road & Pine Tree Drive	Irvington Blvd	10.7 miles (17.2 km)	142,429	Was 79 W. Little York before the merge with 3 Langley
80	MLK/Lockwood	**Houston Gardens**; Kashmere Transit Center	**Crestmont Park**; MLK Jr. Boulevard & Park Village Drive	Lockwood Dr, MLK Jr. Blvd	16.2 miles (26.1 km)	1,487,339	
80	MLK/Lockwood	**Eastex-Jensen**; Tidwell Transit Center	**Crestmont Park**; MLK Jr. Boulevard & Park Village Drive	Lockwood Dr, MLK Jr. Blvd	21.2 miles (34.1 km)	1,487,339	Was 80 Dowling/Lyons before the 2015 change
82	Westheimer	**Downtown**; Congress Street & Smith Street	**Eldridge/West Oaks**; West Oaks Mall	Westheimer Rd	18.2 miles (29.3 km)	4,528,030	
83	Lee Road-JFK	**Eastex-Jensen**; Tidwell Transit Center	**IAH/Airport Area**; World Houston Parkway & International Plaza	US 59 Service Rd, Lee Rd (SB)	12.4 miles (20.0 km)	104,386	
84	Buffalo Speedway	**Spring Branch East**; Northwest Transit Center	**South Main**; Lakes at 610 Drive & West Bellfort Street	I-610 Service Rd, Buffalo Spdwy, University Blvd	12.9 miles (20.8 km)	611,458	
85	Antoine/Washington	**Downtown**; Pierce Street & Main Street	**Antoine West**; West Road & Antoine Drive	Washington Ave, Antoine Dr	17.1 miles (27.5 km)	1,858,183	
85	Antoine/Washington	**Downtown**; Pierce Street & Main Street	**Greenspoint**; Greenspoint Transit Center	Washington Ave, Antoine Dr, Gears Rd	25.1 miles (40.4 km)	1,858,183	
86	FM 1960/Imperial Valley	**Greenspoint**; Greenspoint Transit Center	**Willowbrook**; Tomball Parkway & Willow Chase Boulevard	Imperial Valley Dr, FM 1960 (West)	16.5 miles (26.6 km)	980,473	
87	Sunnyside	**Texas Medical Center**; TMC Transit Center	**South Main**; Fannin South Transit Center	Holcombe Blvd, Yellowstone Blvd, Crestmont St, Reed Rd	14.7 miles (23.7 km)	418,001	Was 87 Yellowstone Circulator prior to the 2015 route change
88	Sagemont	**Greater Hobby Area**; Neuhaus St & Telephone Rd	**Southbelt/Ellington**; San Jacinto College South	Airport Blvd, Almeda Genoa Rd, Beamer Rd	14.5 miles (23.3 km)	376,721	
89	Dacoma	**Spring Branch East**; Northwest Transit Center	**Lazy Brook**; Sherwood Lane & North Becca Lane	Dacoma St, Magnum Rd, North Post Oak Rd	3.5 miles (5.6 km)	47,228	
96	Veterans Memorial	**Northline**; Northline Transit Center/HCC	**Steubner Forest**; Veterans Memorial Drive & Farm To Market Road 1960	Veterans Memorial Dr	15.5 miles (24.9 km)	438,545	
97	Settegast	**Houston Gardens**; Kashmere Transit Center	**East Houston**; Mesa Transit Center	I-610 Service Rd, Wallisville Rd, Oates Rd, E Houston Rd	14.9 miles (24.0 km)	127,224	
98	Briargate	**Central Southwest**; Hiram Clarke Transit Center	**Fondren Gardens**; Fondren Transit Center	Fuqua St, Fondren Rd	7.4 miles (11.9 km)	139,070	
99	Ella – FM 1960	**Acres Homes**; North Shepherd Park & Ride	**Woodcreek**; Lone Star College-North Harris	Ella Blvd, FM 1960 (East)	21.1 miles (34.0 km)	816,836	
102	Bush IAH Express	**Downtown**; Pierce Street & Travis Street	**Bush IAH Airport Terminal C**	North Fwy, Beltway 8, JFK Blvd	26 miles (42 km)	1,293,946	
108	Veterans Memorial Express	**Downtown**; Pierce Street & Travis Street	**Acres Homes**; North Shepherd Park and Ride	North Fwy	10.1 miles (16.3 km)	113,899	
137	Northshore Express	**Downtown**; Gray Street & Brazos Street	**Greater Fifth Ward**; 5th Ward/Denver Harbor TC	East Fwy	4.9 miles (7.9 km)	970,988	Alternate weekend trips
137	Northshore Express	**Downtown**; Gray Street & Brazos Street	**Northshore**; Maxey Road Park & Ride	East Fwy, Uvalde Rd, Woodforest Bl	17.1 miles (27.5 km)	970,988	
151	Westpark Express	**Downtown**; Congress Street & La Branch Street	**Juniper Point**; Mission Bend Transit Center	US 59, Westpark Dr, Harwin Dr	19.2 miles (30.9 km)	360,342	
152	Harwin South Express	**Midtown**; Wheeler Transit Center	**Alief**; Elmsworth Drive & South Course Drive	US 59, Harwin Dr, Corporate Dr	15.5 miles (24.9 km)	537,553	Interlined with 153 from Wheeler TC to Ranchester Dr
153	Harwin North Express	**Midtown**; Wheeler Transit Center	**Eldridge/West Oaks**; Valedictorian Drive & Briar Forest Drive	US 59, Harwin Dr, Briar Forest Dr, Enclave Pkwy	20.7 miles (33.3 km)	911,050	Interlined with 152 from Wheeler TC to Ranchester Dr
161	Wilcrest Express	**Downtown**; Downtown Transit Center	**Greater Fondren Southwest**; West Bellfort Park & Ride	Bellfort, Wilcrest, Memorial Drive, Gessner, Katy Freeway	26.1 miles (42.0 km)	993,462	Interlined with 162 from Downtown TC to Wilcrest Drive
162	Memorial Express	**Downtown**; Downtown Transit Center	**Addicks Park Ten**; Addicks Park & Ride	Memorial Drive, Gessner Road, Katy Freeway, Washington Avenue	22.5 miles (36.2 km)	425,741	Interlined with 161 from Downtown TC to Wilcrest Drive
202	Kuykendahl P&R	**Greenspoint**; Kuykendahl Park and Ride	**Downtown**; Stops along Milam, Travis, St. Joseph and Jefferson	North Freeway HOV		181,356	
204	Spring P&R	**Spring**; Spring Park and Ride	**Downtown**; Stops along Milam, Travis, St. Joseph and Jefferson	North Freeway HOV		200,601	
209	Spring/Kuykendahl P&R	**Spring**; Spring Park and Ride; **Greenspoint**; Kuykendahl Park and Ride	**Downtown**; Stops along Milam, Travis, St. Joseph and Jefferson	North Freeway HOV		39,561	Midday service for 202 and 204
212	Seton Lake P&R	Seton Lake Park and Ride	**Downtown**; Stops along Milam, Travis, St. Joseph and Jefferson	SH 249, North Freeway HOV		91,055	
216	W L York / Northwest Station P&R	**Jersey Village**; Northwest Station; **Brookhollow West**; West Little York Park and Ride	**Downtown**; Stops along Smith and Louisiana Streets	Northwest Freeway HOV, Katy Freeway		233,008	
217	Cypress P&R	**Cypress**; Cypress Park and Ride	**Downtown**; Stops along Smith and Louisiana Streets	Northwest Freeway HOV, Katy Freeway		487,431	
219	W.L York/NW Station/Cypress	**Cypress**; Cypress Park and Ride; **Jersey Village**; Northwest Station; **Brookhollow West**; West Little York Park and Ride	**Downtown**; Stops along Smith and Louisiana Streets	Northwest Freeway HOV, Katy Freeway		56,626	Midday service for 216 and 217
221	Kingsland P&R	Kingsland Park and Ride	**Downtown**; Stops along Smith and Louisiana	Katy Freeway HOV		195,953	
222	Grand Parkway P&R	Grand Parkway Park and Ride	**Downtown**; Stops along Smith and Louisiana	Katy Freeway HOV		748,408	
228	Addicks P&R	**Addicks**; Addicks Park and Ride	**Downtown**; Stops along Smith and Louisiana	Katy Freeway HOV		205,288	
229	Addicks/Kingsland/Grand Parkway P&R	Grand Parkway Park and Ride; Kingsland Park and Ride; **Addicks**; Addicks Park and Ride	**Downtown**; Stops along Smith and Louisiana	Katy Freeway HOV		68,270	Midday service for 221, 222 and 228
236	Maxey P&R	**Baytown**; Baytown Park and Ride	**Downtown**; Stops along Congress, Franklin, Milam, Travis, St. Joseph and Pierce	East Freeway		46,729 (27,345 from Rodeo route 236)	
237	Baytown P&R	**Baytown**; Baytown Park and Ride	**Downtown**; Stops along Congress, Franklin, Milam, Travis, St. Joseph and Pierce	East Freeway		3,888	
244	Monroe / El Dorado P&R	El Dorado Park and Ride	**Downtown**; Stops along St. Joseph, Pierce, Travis, Milam, Franklin and Congress	Gulf Freeway HOV		144,505	
247	Fuqua / Bay Area P&R	Bay Area Park and Ride	**Downtown**; Stops along St. Joseph, Pierce, Travis, Milam, Franklin and Congress	Bay Area Boulevard, Gulf Freeway HOV		209,907	
249	Bay Area / El Dorado / Fuqua / Monroe P&R	Bay Area Park and Ride	**Downtown**; Stops along St. Joseph, Pierce, Travis, Milam, Franklin and Congress	Bay Area Boulevard, Gulf Freeway HOV		49,575	Midday service for 244 and 247
255	Kingwood P&R	Kingwood Park and Ride	**Downtown**; Stops along Congress, Franklin, Milam, Travis, St. Joseph and Jefferson	Eastex Freeway HOV		124,122	
256	Eastex P&R	Eastex Park and Ride	**Downtown**; Stops along Congress, Franklin, Milam, Travis, St. Joseph and Jefferson	Eastex Freeway HOV		126,832	
257	Townsen P&R	Townsen Park and Ride	**Downtown**; Stops along Congress, Franklin, Milam, Travis, St. Joseph and Jefferson	Eastex Freeway HOV		172,510	
259	Eastex/Townsen/Kingwood P&R	Kingwood Park and Ride	**Downtown**; Stops along Congress, Franklin, Milam, Travis, St. Joseph and Jefferson	Eastex Freeway HOV		36,246	Midway service for 255, 256 and 257
265	West Bellfort	West Bellfort Park and Ride	**Downtown**; Stops along Louisiana, Smith, Franklin and Congress	Southwest Freeway HOV		284,812	
269	West Bellfort	West Bellfort Park and Ride	**Downtown**; Stops along Louisiana, Smith, Franklin and Congress	Southwest Freeway HOV		25,950	Midday service for 265
270	Missouri City P&R	**Missouri City**; Missouri City Park and Ride	**Texas Medical Center**; TMC Transit Center	Fort Bend Tollway Frontage Road, Fondren, S. Main, Pressler		252,804	
292	Southwest Freeway / TMC P&R	West Bellfort Park and Ride	**Texas Medical Center**; TMC Transit Center	Southwest Freeway HOV, Main Street		65,875	
297	Gulf Freeway / TMC P&R	South Point Park and Ride	East @ Cambridge	Gulf Freeway HOV, South Freeway, OST		168,795	
298	Katy Freeway / TMC P&R	Kingsland Park and Ride	**Texas Medical Center**; TMC Transit Center	Katy Freeway HOV, Studemont		316,355	
309	Gulfton Circulator	Westpark/Lower Uptown Transit Center	Westpark/Lower Uptown Transit Center	Glenmont, Hillcroft, Bellaire, S. Rice	8.8 miles (14.2 km)	149,242	Runs in a loop
310	Gulfton Circulator	Westpark/Lower Uptown Transit Center	Westpark/Lower Uptown Transit Center	Glenmont, Hillcroft, Bellaire, S. Rice	8.8 miles (14.2 km)	158,884	Runs in a loop
314	Hiram Clarke curb2curb					129,015	
329	Southeast/Sunnyside curb2curb					479,823	
344	Acres Homes curb2curb					123,131	
347	Gulfton curb2curb					2,223	
360	Peerless Shuttle	**South Union**; Southeast Transit Center	**South Park**; Jutland Road & Bellfort Street		6 miles (9.7 km)	134,832	
363	Missouri City curb2curb					126,456	
377	Kashmere/Maxey Road curb2curb					67,801	Kashmere Late night zone discontinued in 2025 and replaced by local bus service
399	Kuykendahl Shuttle	**Greenspoint**; Greenspoint Transit Center	**Greenspoint**; Kuykendahl Park & Ride	Ella Blvd, Kuykendahl Rd	4.7 miles (7.6 km)	37,215	
433	Silver Line Post Oak BRT	**Spring Branch East**; Northwest Transit Center	**Gulfton**; Westpark/Lower Uptown Transit Center	Post Oak Blvd	4.7 miles (7.6 km)	212,691	Originally 33 Post Oak
500	Downtown Direct	**Meadowbrook/Allendale**; Monroe Park & Ride	**Bush IAH Airport Terminal C**	Eastex Freeway HOV, Gulf Freeway HOV		171,274	Was 500 Airport Direct prior to its original discontinuation in 2011 due to low ridership; revived in 2025 as part of the METRONow plan.

=== Discontinued ===
Route Name	Reason for discontinuation	Route Color
1 Hospital	Eliminated in 2015 due to new route system	**Red**
3 West Gray	Section eliminated in 2015 due to new route system	**Green**
5 Kashmere	Section eliminated in 2015 due to new route system	**Blue**
7 Tanglewood		**Green**
8 South Main	Eliminated in 2015 due to new route system	**Blue**
9 North Main	Section eliminated in 2015 due to new route system	**Green**
11 Nance	Section eliminated in 2015 due to new route system	**Green**
12 Allen House		
13 Plaza del Oro Circulator		
13 Westridge	Shown on the Reimaging Side By Side map; absorbed into route 84 in the New Bus Network release	**Blue**
15 Fulton		**Green**
16 Memorial		
17 Gulfton		
18 Kirby	Eliminated in 2015 due to new route system	**Green**
19 Wilcrest	Eliminated in 2015 due to new route system	**Green**
21 Northshore Limited		
22 Almeda		
24 Kempwood		
24 Northline	Eliminated in 2015 due to new route system	**Blue**/**Green Segment**
26 Outer Loop	Eliminated in 2015 due to new route system	**Blue**
27 Inner Loop	Eliminated in 2015 due to new route system	**Blue**
28 Southmore		
31 Memorial Limited		
32 Harwin Limited		
32 Renwick / San Felipe	Split into 32 Renwick and 35 San Felipe in 2024	**Blue**
33 Post Oak	Replaced by Silver Line (route 433)	**Red**
34 Montrose	Eliminated in 2015 due to new route system	**Green**
35 Fairview	Originally 35 Leeland, later 35 Fairview/Leeland; discontinued in 2004	**Green**
36 Lawndale	Section eliminated in 2015 due to new route system	**Blue**/**Green Segment**
37 El Sol	Eliminated in 2015 due to new route system	**Green**
39 Long Point		
39 Parker Circulator		
40 Pecore	Section eliminated in 2015 due to new route system	
41 Garden Villas Express		
41 Gulf Meadows Circulator		
42 Holman	Eliminated in 2015 due to new route system	
43 South Belt Limited		
43 Pinemont Plaza		
43 Kirkwood	Proposed service as part of New Bus Network, but never implemented	**Green**
48 Navigation	Was 48 Navigation/West Dallas until 2011; eliminated in 2015 due to new route system	**Green**
50 Harrisburg	Section eliminated in 2015 due to new route system	**Red**/**Blue Segment**
50 Heights	Section renumbered as a portion of route 40 in the New Bus Network	**Blue**/**Red**
51 Buffalo Speedway		
53 Briar Forest	Eliminated in 2015 due to new route system	**Blue**
54 Aldine/Hollyvale Circulator		
55 Greenspoint/Kingwood Limited	Ran from May 30, 2004, to October 30, 2004	
55 E Tidwell	Shown on the Reimaging Side By Side map but never existed; combined with 45 Tidwell	**Blue**
57 JFK Limited		
59 Southwest Freeway P&R		
60 Hardy	Section eliminated in 2015 due to new route system	**Green**
60 South MacGregor	Section eliminated in 2015 due to new route system	**Green**
63 San Felipe Limited	Fondren Road section split off to 163 Fondren Limited (now current 63 Fondren) in the 1990s; remainder discontinued in 1997	
64 Gulfton Limited	Merged into 17 Gulfton	
64 Lincoln City	Discontinued in 2026; replaced by 344 Acres Homes curb2curb	**Green**
66 Irvington	Merged into route 78; now covered by 79 Irvington	
66 Yale	Eliminated in 2015 due to new route system	**Green**
70 University	Section eliminated in 2015 due to new route system	
71 Cottage Grove	Discontinued in 2024 due to low ridership; replaced with zTrip on-demand taxi service (itself to be discontinued in 2026)	**Green**
74 Carver Road Circulator		
75 Taft		
75 Energy Corridor	Replaced by 75 Eldridge in 2011	**Red**
77 Liberty	Section eliminated in 2015 due to new route system	**Blue**/**Green**
78 Alabama	Section eliminated in 2015 due to new route system	**Green**
81 Westheimer-Sharpstown	Eliminated in 2015 due to new route system	**Blue**/**Red Segment**
84 Fountain View	Became a branch of 82 Westheimer	
84 T.C. Jester Limited		
88 Broadway Limited		
88 Hobby Airport	Eliminated in 2015 due to new route system	**Green**
89 Yale	Merged into route 64, now route 66	
89 South Park Circulator		**Green**
91 North Shepherd / Texas Medical Center	Renumbered to 291	
92 Westwood / Texas Medical Center	Renumbered to 292	
93 Greens Road	Renumbered to 102 in the 1990s due to shuttle expansions	
93 Northwest/Greenway Plaza Shuttle	Discontinued in 2004	
94		
95 Uptown Post Oak	Renumbered to 295	
96 Uptown St. James		
98 Texas Special Blue		
99 Texas Special Red		
101 Airport Express		
107 FM 1960		
112 FM 149		
112 Bush IAH Downtown Direct		
119 Wilcrest Commuter	Renumbered from route 19 in the 1990s; renumbered back to route 19 in 1997	
131 Memorial Limited	Eliminated in 2015 due to new route system	**Green**
132 Harwin Limited	Eliminated in 2015 due to new route system	**Green**
143 South Belt Express		
160 Memorial City Express	Discontinued in 2025 and absorbed into 162 Memorial Express	**Green**
163 Fondren Limited	Replaced part of Route 63 San Felipe/Fondren Limited; replaced by current 63 Fondren in 2015 due to new route system	**Blue**/**Green**
164 Hillcroft		
201 North Shepherd		
203 North Shepherd/Seton Lake	Split into 201 North Shepherd and 212 Seton Lake	
205 Kingwood		
206 Eastex		
210 West Belt	Discontinued in 2004	
214 Northwest Station	Merged into route 216	
215 West Little York Commuter		
227 Katy Freeway P&R	Merged into route 298	
245 Edgebrook P&R		
246 Bay Area	Merged into route 247	
248 El Dorado	Merged into route 244	
256/255 Kingwood/Eastex	Split into routes 255 and 256 in 2025	**Gray**
261 West Loop P&R		
262 Westwood	Merged into route 265	
263 Alief	Merged into route 265	
271 Missouri City - SH 6 P&R	Discontinued in 2025	**Gray**
273 Gessner P&R	Merged into route 274	
274 Westchase/Gessner P&R	Originally 274 Westchase P&R; eliminated in 2015 due to new route system, with portions covered by 151 Westpark Express	
283 Kuykendahl	Discontinued in 2020	
284 Kingwood/Townsen-Greenway Plaza/Uptown	Discontinued in 2004	
285 Kingsland/Addicks-Uptown/Greenway Plaza	Discontinued in 2004, replaced by 298	
286 Little York/Pinemont/Uptown P&R	Discontinued due to low ridership	
289 San Jacinto P&R		
291 Conroe Park & Ride	Switched to a third-party provider in 2025	**Gray**
295 Uptown Post Oak Addicks/Galleria Commuter		
311 Bayou Event Shuttle	Discontinued due to low ridership	
312 Grocers Shuttle	Absorbed into 5 Southmore in 2020	
313 Allen Parkway Special		
320 TMC Red Shuttle	No longer operated by METRO	
321 TMC White Shuttle	No longer operated by METRO	
322 TMC Blue Shuttle	No longer operated by METRO	
323 TMC North Circulator	Merged with 325 to form the 326 in 2004	
324 TMC South Circulator	Merged with 324 to form the 326 in 2004	
325 Smith Lands Circulator		
326 TMC Campus Trolley	Replaced 323 and 324	
352 Swingle Shuttle		
364 MCTX Flex Route		
402 P & HC Shuttle		
402 Quickline Bellaire BRT	Discontinued in 2026; replaced by 2 Bellaire	Coral
403 S & K Shuttle		
404 Northwest Shuttle		
404 Beechnut Flyer	Eliminated in 2001 due to low ridership	
412 Greenlink Circulator Green Route	Cancelled in 2020 due to COVID-19 pandemic	
413 Greenlink Circulator Orange Route	Cancelled in 2020 due to COVID-19 pandemic	
418 Harris County Jury Shuttle	Discontinued in 2023 due to low ridership	
420 Post Oak Special Gold		
421 Post Oak Special Green		
426/427 TMC Swiftline		
464 Bell Station Trolley	Discontinued in 2004	
465 Main Street Square Trolley		
466 St. Joseph/Preston Trolley		

=== Transit centers ===
Bold = Terminates at the Transit Center
Italics = A branch terminates at the transit center
/ / = METRORail connections

Transit Center	Parking	Routes
Acres Homes	None	3 Langley-Little York; 30 Clinton/Ella; 44 Acres Homes; **64 Lincoln City**; 344 Acres Homes curb2curb
Bellaire	None	2 Bellaire; **20 Canal/Memorial**; 49 Chimney Rock/S. Post Oak; 65 Bissonnet; 309/310 Gulfton Circulators; 402 Bellaire Quickline
Burnett	None	**3 Langley-Little York**; 51 Hardy-Kelley; 52 Hardy-Ley; **79 Irvington**
Downtown	None	**6 Jensen/Greens**; **51 Hardy-Kelley**; **52 Hardy-Ley**; **54 Scott**; **161 Wilcrest Express**; **162 Memorial Express**
Eastwood	65 spaces	**4 Beechnut**; **9 Gulfton/Holman**; **25 Richmond**; 40 Telephone/Heights; **41 Kirby/Polk**; **50 Broadway**; 80 MLK/Lockwood; 244 Monroe/El Dorado P&R; 249 Bay Area / El Dorado / Fuqua / Monroe P&R
Fannin South	1437 spaces	**8 West Bellfort**; 11 Almeda/Lyons; **73 Bellfort**; **87 Sunnyside**
Fifth Ward/Denver Harbor	24 spaces	11 Almeda/Lyons; **28 OST-Wayside**; 48 Market; **66 Quitman**; **77 Homestead**; **78 Wayside**; 80 MLK/Lockwood; 137 Northshore Express; 377 Kashmere/Maxey Road curb2curb
Fondren (formerly Missouri City)	779 spaces	**63 Fondren**; **98 Briargate**; 314 Hiram Clarke curb2curb; 363 Missouri City curb2curb
Greenspoint	None	**6 Jensen/Greens**; **56 Airline/Montrose**; **85 Antoine/Washington**; **86 FM 1960/Imperial Valley**; 99 Ella-FM 1960; 102 Bush IAH Express; **399 Kuykendahl Shuttle**
Hiram Clarke	83 spaces	**11 Almeda/Lyons**; **14 Hiram Clarke**; **54 Scott**; **98 Briargate**; 314 Hiram Clarke curb2curb
Hobby	None	40 Telephone/Heights; **50 Broadway**; **73 Bellfort**; 88 Sagemont
Kashmere	17 spaces	3 Langley-Little York; **26 Long Point/Cavalcade**; **29 Cullen/Hirsch**; **36 Kempwood**; 51 Hardy-Kelley; 52 Hardy-Ley; 80 MLK/Lockwood; **97 Settegast**; 377 Kashmere/Maxey Road curb2curb
Magnolia Park	78 spaces	**20 Canal/Memorial**; 28 OST-Wayside; **38 Manchester-Lawndale**; 50 Broadway; **76 Evergreen**
Mesa	100 spaces	**45 Tidwell**; 52 Hardy-Ley; 78 Wayside; **97 Settegast**
Mission Bend	862 spaces	**2 Bellaire**; **4 Beechnut**; **25 Richmond**; 75 Eldridge; **151 Westpark Express**
Northline	None	**23 Clay-West 43rd**; 36 Kempwood; 45 Tidwell; 56 Airline/Montrose; 79 Irvington; **96 Veterans Memorial**
Northwest	195 spaces	**39 Katy Freeway**; **47 Hillcroft**; **49 Chimney Rock/S. Post Oak**; **58 Hammerly**; **66 Quitman**; **70 Memorial**; **72 Westview**; **84 Buffalo Speedway**; 85 Antoine/Washington; **89 Dacoma Shuttle**; 161 Wilcrest Express; 162 Memorial Express; 216 W L York / Northwest Station P&R; 217 Cypress P&R; 219 W.L York/NW Station/Cypress; 298 Katy Freeway / TMC P&R; **433 Silver Line**
Palm Center	None	5 Southmore; 87 Sunnyside
Southeast	21 spaces	5 Southmore; 28 OST-Wayside; 29 Cullen/Hirsch; 54 Scott; **60 Cambridge**; **360 Peerless Shuttle**
Tidwell	809 spaces	6 Jensen/Greens; **80 MLK/Lockwood**; **83 Lee Road-JFK**
Texas Medical Center	None	**2 Bellaire**; 4 Beechnut; **10 Willowbend**; **14 Hiram Clarke**; **27 Shepherd**; 28 OST–Wayside; **41 Kirby/Polk**; **56 Airline/Montrose**; **60 Cambridge**; **68 Braeswood**; 84 Buffalo Speedway; **87 Sunnyside**; **270 Missouri City - TMC P&R**; 292 Southwest Freeway - TMC P&R; 297 South Point/Monroe - TMC P&R; **298 Addicks/Northwest Transit Center –TMC P&R**; **402 Quickline Bellaire**
West Loop	772 spaces	**7 West Airport**; **32 Renwick**; 49 Chimney Rock/S. Post Oak; 68 Braeswood
Westpark/Lower Uptown	242 spaces (175 covered)	20 Canal/Memorial; 292 Southwest Freeway / TMC P&R; 309/310 Gulfton Circulators; **433 Silver Line**
Wheeler	None	**5 Southmore**; 25 Richmond; **65 Bissonnet**; **152 Harwin South Express**; **153 Harwin North Express**

=== Park and Ride lots ===
Metro operates 28 different park and ride locations.

Park & Ride	Parking	Routes
Addicks	2438 spaces	67 Dairy Ashford; 75 Eldridge; 162 Memorial Express; 228 Addicks P&R; 229 Grand Parkway/Kingsland/Addicks; 298 Katy Freeway/TMC P&R
Bay Area	1155 spaces	247 Fuqua/Bay Area P&R; 249 Bay Area/El Dorado/Fuqua/Monroe P&R
Baytown	16 spaces	237 Baytown P&R
Cypress	1500 spaces (covered)	217 Cypress P&R; 219 Cypress/NW Station/W L York P&R
Eastex	877 spaces	83 Lee Road-JFK; 256 Eastex P&R; 259 Kingwood/Townsen/Eastex P&R
El Dorado	1227 spaces	244 Monroe/El Dorado P&R; 249 Bay Area/El Dorado/Fuqua/Monroe P&R
Fuqua	938 spaces	88 Sagemont; 247 Fuqua/Bay Area P&R; 249 Bay Area/El Dorado/Fuqua/Monroe P&R
Gessner	415 spaces	46 Gessner; 151 Westpark Express
Grand Parkway	1714 spaces (covered)	222 Grand Parkway P&R; 229 Grand Parkway/Kingsland/Addicks
Hillcroft	922 spaces	151 Westpark Express; 152 Harwin South Express; 153 Harwin North Express; 309/310 Gulfton Circulator
Kingsland	2377 spaces	221 Kingsland P&R; 229 Grand Parkway/Kingsland/Addicks; 298 Katy Freeway/TMC P&R
Kingwood	1034 spaces	255 Kingwood P&R; 259 Kingwood/Townsen/Eastex P&R
Kuykendahl	2171 spaces	202 Kuykendahl P&R; 209 Kuykendahl/Spring P&R; 399 Kuykendahl Shuttle
Maxey Road	1129 spaces	137 Northshore Express; 236 Maxey P&R
Missouri City	1750 spaces (covered)	270 Missouri City P&R
Monroe	904 spaces	40 Telephone/Heights; 244 Monroe/El Dorado P&R; 249 Bay Area/El Dorado/Fuqua/Monroe P&R; 297 Gulf Freeway/TMC P&R; 500 Downtown Direct
North Shepherd	603 spaces	3 Langley/Little York; 27 Shepherd; 30 Clinton/Ella; 40 Telephone/Heights; 59 Aldine Mail; 64 Lincoln City; 96 Veterans Memorial; 99 Ella-FM 1960; 108 Veterans Memorial Express
Northwest Station	2361 spaces	216 W L York/NW Station P&R; 219 Cypress/NW Station/W L York P&R
Seton Lake	1286 spaces	44 Acres Homes; 212 Seton Lake P&R
South Point	496 spaces	297 Gulf Freeway/TMC P&R
Spring	1263 spaces	86 FM 1960/Imperial Valley; 99 Ella-FM 1960; 204 Spring P&R; 209 Kuykendahl/Spring P&R
Townsen	996 spaces	257 Townsen P&R; 259 Kingwood/Townsen/Eastex P&R
West Bellfort	2024 spaces	8 West Bellfort; 161 Wilcrest Express; 265 West Bellfort P&R; 269 West Bellfort P&R; 292 Southwest Freeway/TMC P&R
West Little York	1102 spaces	45 Tidwell; 46 Gessner; 216 W L York/NW Station P&R; 219 Cypress/NW Station/W L York P&R
Westchase	1468 spaces	151 Westpark Express
Westwood	826 spaces	292 Southwest Freeway/TMC P&R

=== Advertising policy ===
Metro has had a policy since its founding in which it refuses to place advertisements on buses, claiming that such a move would create an unsightly appearance on the buses. Metro had originally attempted to generate extra revenue by only advertising in its bus shelters, but a city ordinance blocked the decision. After a failed attempt to get permission to partially use advertisements on buses, Metro has since decided to continue enforcing its policy.

Due to the lack of funding for METRORail expansion, the policy has been proposed to be expanded to light rail vehicles in order to generate additional revenue. Metro began advertising the Houston Zoo on the side of three light rail vehicles in 2010. In late September 2010, due to the decreased budget, Metro began to seriously consider advertising on their buses.

=== Fares ===
In the fall of 2006, Metro revealed plans to rework its fare system. The new system involved pre-paid fare cards (contactless smart cards), called Q Cards, that can be recharged on local buses and Metro TVMs. In April 2026, a new RideMETRO fare system replaced the METRO Q Fare Card and Q Mobile Ticketing App in favor of RideMETRO Fare Cards and an updated app after a several‑month transition period. 3-hour passes are electronically added to the card each time it is used. Frequent users get "Rider Rewards" that offer one free ride per 10 paid trips.

Senior citizens 65–69 will continue to receive a discounted rate as will disabled patrons. Senior citizens over 70 may ride for free. Children under 5 also ride for free when accompanied by an adult (limit 3). This was intended to keep the base fare low and phase out the previous fare system consisting of transfers (was reinstated from July 2015 to March 2016), as well as day (reinstated on October 7, 2013), weekly, monthly and annual passes, which occurred in early 2008. Since November 2, 2008, local fares have held steady at $1.25. Currently another fare increase is being mulled as a means to pay for constructing the expansion of the light rail.

November 2024 saw some of the busses get replaced with Lecip fareboxes off Cubic ones. By July 2026 the whole fleet saw the new ones.

Service Type	Regular	Discounted
Local	$1.25	$0.60
Zone 1	$2	$1
Zone 2	$3.25	$1.60
Zone 3	$3.75	$1.85
Zone 4/500 IAH Downtown Direct	$4.50	$2.25
Zone 5	$8	$4
24-Hour Pass (began October 7, 2013)	$3	$1.50

=== Fleet ===
As of 2026, Houston METRO’s bus fleet consists of the following:

- Gillig BRT Plus CNG 29’
- MCI D4500CT
- MCI D45 CRT
- New Flyer XD40
- New Flyer XD60
- New Flyer XN40
- NABI 40-LFW Gen III
- NABI 40-LFW Gen III CNG
- Nova Bus LFS
- Nova Bus LFSA
- Nova Bus LFS CNG
- Nova Bus LFSe+
- OBI Orion VII EPA10 HEV

== METROLift ==
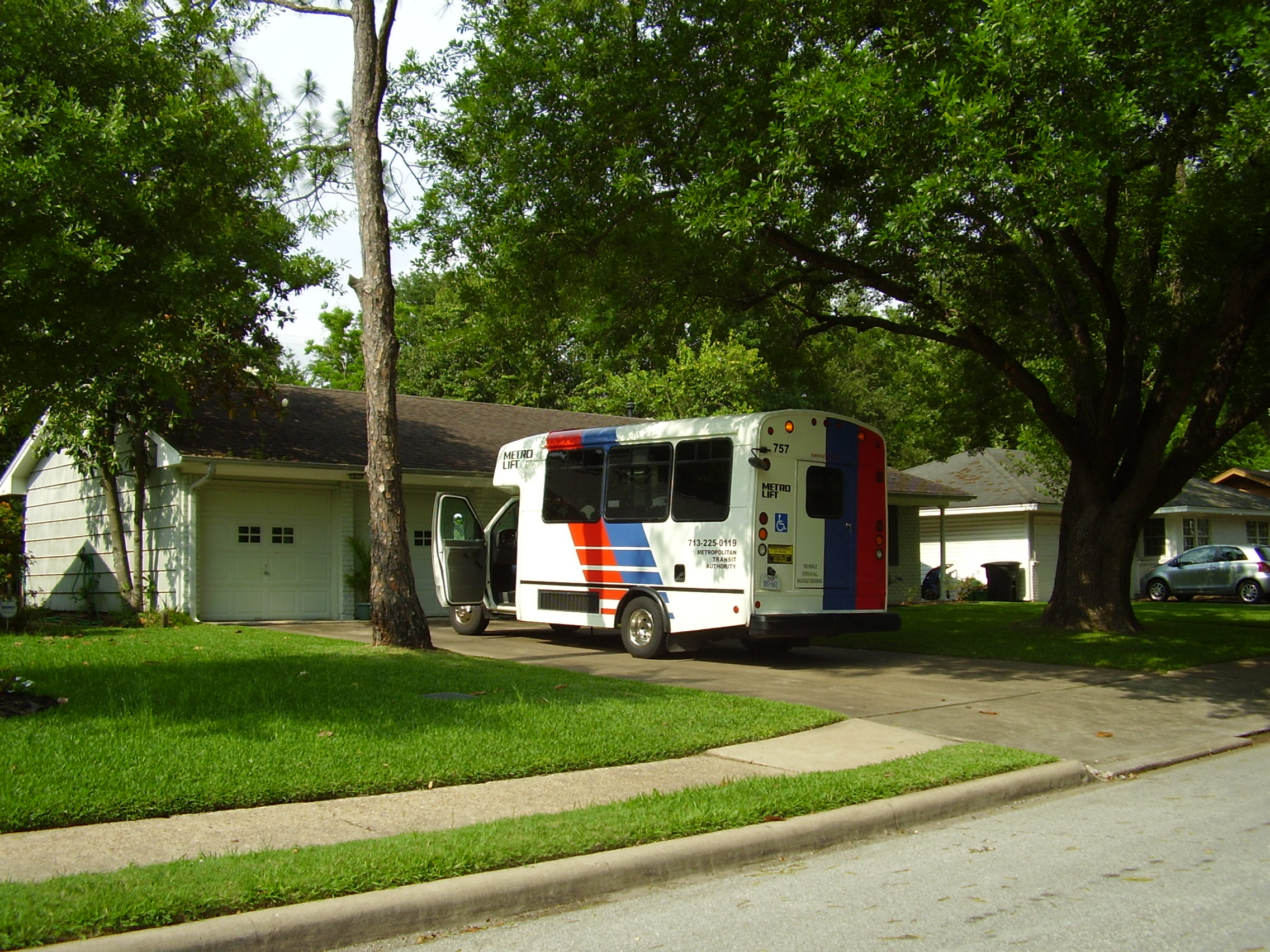
A typical Metro Lift vehicle

Metro Lift provides transportation needs for people with a disability, who cannot board, or ride from a regular Metro bus. The Metro Lift vehicles are shared-ride, meaning that they take multiple customers and groups. Metro tells its customers to use standard Metro bus services whenever possible. Metro Lift uses special vehicles that are distinct from fixed-route Metro buses. The Authority's METROLift paratransit service will have provided 1.9 million trips to 16,178 eligible riders in FY2017, using both METRO-owned lift-equipped vans and contractor-owned and operated accessible minivans.

== HOV system ==
Metro has been known for pioneering the use of express buses in high-occupancy vehicle (HOV) lanes. This was part of the reversible HOV lane concept that began in 1979 with the completion of the North Freeway (I-45) Contraflow Lane. This concept used the inside freeway lane of the "opposite" direction separated by traffic pylons and is closed to all vehicles except buses and vanpools. Although a head-on collision involving a car and a bus occurred in 1980, the concept became permanent, but with the HOV lanes separated from the rest of traffic with Jersey barriers.

The HOV lanes run between Downtown Houston (inbound A.M. and outbound P.M.) and the suburbs and are found on portions of the Katy Freeway, Gulf Freeway, North Freeway, Southwest Freeway, Eastex Freeway and Northwest Freeway.

Since Metro Express buses use them during rush hour, most routes lead to the Park and Ride lots and use "secret" HOV lane exits (often elevated T-intersections) that lead to the lots (also used by vehicles) without having to exit the freeway to street intersections. The HOV system will soon get an overhaul in the event of major freeway construction to take place in Houston and may have HOV lanes in both directions with the concept of HOT (Toll) lanes introduced.

In 2011, Metro began conversion of the HOV lanes to High Occupancy Toll (HOT) lanes. Commuters with only one person in a vehicle will be able to pay a toll to use the lanes when the conversion is complete.

== Future plans ==
=== METRO Solutions (2003) ===
METRO Solutions was a regional transit plan approved by voters in November 2003 by a 52–48 vote. The plan proposed:

- 64.8 miles (104 km) of Light Rail Transit
- 8 miles (13 km) of Commuter Rail Transit (CRT)
- 9 New Transit Centers
- 9 New Park & Rides Lots
- 250 miles of two-way HOV lanes

In June 2005, METRO announced a revised plan for expansion of the METRORail system. The plan included one new light rail corridor and three bus rapid transit corridors. The bus rapid transit lines would have later been converted into light rail when ridership warranted the conversion.

On October 18, 2007, the plan was revised to allow for the possibility of more federal funding. METRO decided to have all the lines consist of light rail from the start after some public backlash to the agency turning back from its original plans of light rail corridors.

By 2017, only 15 miles of light rail were completed with no commuter rail lines established. 8 new transit centers, 7 new park & ride lots, and only one new two-way HOV corridor were completed as well.

=== METRONext (2019) ===
The public with a 68% vote approved the METRONext plan in November 2019. The plan calls for:

- 110 miles of Regional Express Network, including two-way HOV lanes
- 21 new or improved Park & Ride lots and Transit Centers
- 16 miles of light rail expansion
- 75 miles of a bus rapid transit network METRORapid
- 290 miles of BOOST and Signature bus service

The referendum authorized the agency to issue up to $3.5 billion in bonds to pay for the projects while the remaining $4 billion will come from federal grants and local funds.

==== Moving Forward Plan (bus rapid transit - BRT) ====
Under the METRONext "Moving Forward Plan", a superset of the proposed University METRORail line would be served by a new bus rapid transit (BRT) line under the METRORapid brand. A preliminary version of the superset "University Corridor" BRT line, 22 mi (35 km) long, would extend to Westchase Park & Ride in the west, pass through the stops proposed for the derelict light rail plan, and continue north past Eastwood Transit Center to Tidwell Transit Center.

Additional BRT lines proposed under "Moving Forward" include:

- "Interstate 45 North" from downtown to George Bush Intercontinental Airport via Greenspoint
- "Inner Katy Corridor" to Northwest Transit Center, connecting to METRORail Purple/Green line stations
- "Uptown/Gulfton" extension of the Uptown Line south to Gulfton
- "West Houston Corridor" along Beltway 8 or Gessner Road between West Little York Park & Ride and Missouri City

=== METRONow (2025) ===
On February 24, 2025, METRO unveiled a new comprehensive plan, named METRONow plan, that aimed to improve mobility and increase ridership of their transit system. The four initiatives in the plan were to focus on safety and security, improve cleanliness, increase service and reliability, and expand accessibility.

== Metro Police ==
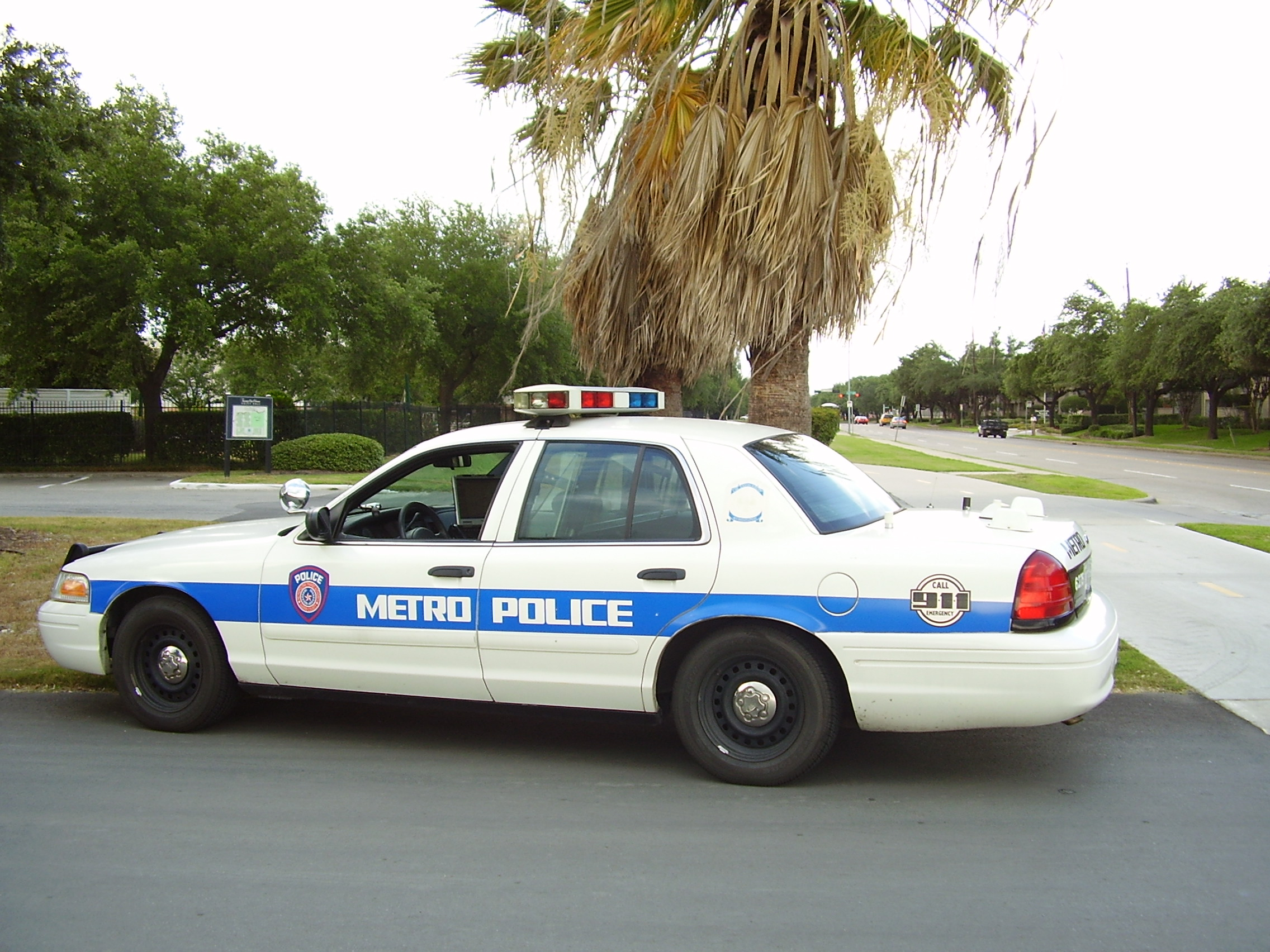
Metro Police automobile

Metro operates its own police department. With over 185 Texas peace officers and 88 non-sworn, civilian employees, the department's main goal is to ensure safety and security on the transit system. The department was established in 1982 and is accredited with the Texas Police Chiefs Association (TPCA), one of only five public transit police departments in North America to be so.

State law grants Metro Police jurisdiction in the counties in which Metro is located, provides services, or is supported by a general sales and use tax. As peace officers, state law also grants Metro Police the power to arrest without warrant for any felony, breach of the peace, disorderly conduct or intoxication offense that is committed in their presence or view while in Texas. They may also make an arrest pursuant to a warrant anywhere in Texas.

== Headquarters ==
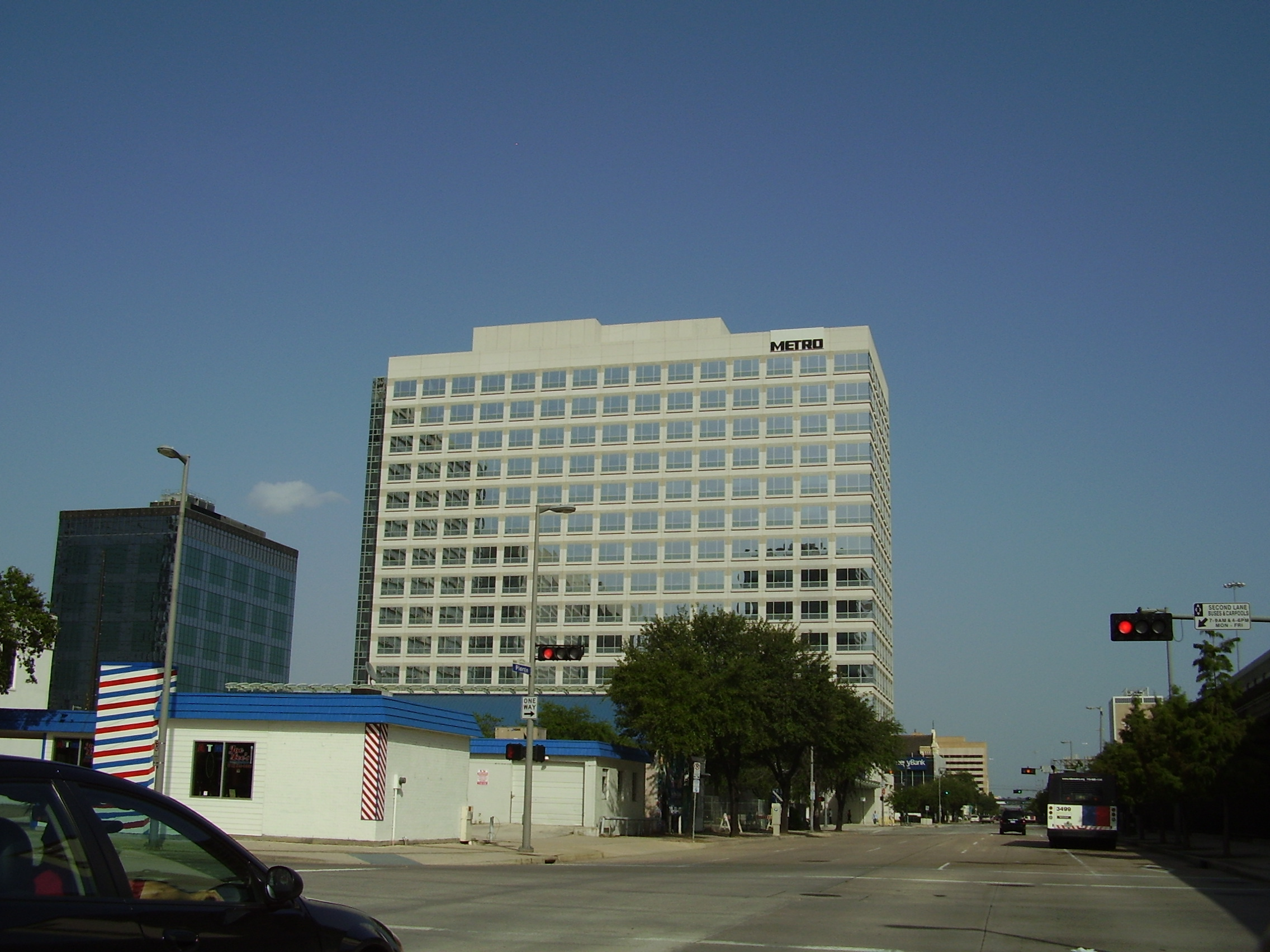
Lee P. Brown Administration Building, the headquarters, in Downtown Houston

METRO's headquarters are in the Lee P. Brown Administration Building in Downtown Houston. The $41 million, 14-story glass and steel building has over 400,000 square feet (37,000 m^{2}) of space. The facility includes the Downtown Transit Center bus and rail platforms, a MetroRide store, and passenger restrooms. The building was designed by the Houston-based Pierce Goodwin Alexander & Linville.

The building was named for former Houston mayor Lee P. Brown in honor of his advocacy for the METRORail Red Line. “Houston in Harmony”, a 1999 mural commissioned in Brown's honor, was moved from the Houston City Hall Annex to the Administration Building in 2005.

Before the construction of the Administration Building, METRO was headquartered in Louisiana Place (now Total Plaza), also in Downtown Houston. The agency occupied 193,000 square feet (17,900 m^{2}) of space across 10 floors, for which it paid a $3.8 million annual rent. Construction of the dedicated Administration Building, which was estimated to save the agency $273 million over a 30-year period, began in 2002, with 80% of the project's funding coming from the Federal Transit Administration. METRO began moving from Louisiana Place to the Administration Building in January 2005, and its lease at Louisiana Place expired the following April. Total Petrochemicals USA, a subsidiary of TotalEnergies, moved into the space that was previously occupied by METRO.

== Ridership and demographics ==
A Regional Fixed Route Transit Rider survey sponsored by the Houston-Galveston Area Council (H-GAC), in partnership with METRO, was completed in 2017. Over 22,000 riders were surveyed—the most expansive ever conducted on a regional basis—and included eight regional fixed-route transit agencies which operate in H-GAC's eight-county region. The survey found that 58 percent of riders use transit to get to work, 20 percent use it for shopping or personal business, and about 10 percent of riders use a bus or train to get to school. 88 percent of riders reported that they rode transit at least three days per week with almost 50 percent of riders riding at least five days per week. The survey's findings concluded that 88 percent of all the trips were directly contributing to the region's economy.

== Member cities ==
Metro provides transportation services to fifteen member cities, as well as some unincorporated portions of Harris County. Metro's service area pays a 1¢ sales tax to fund the agency's operations.

In addition to the city of Houston, Metro serves fourteen cities in the Greater Houston area, collectively termed the "Multi-Cities":

- Bellaire
- Bunker Hill Village
- El Lago
- Hedwig Village
- Hilshire Village
- Humble
- Hunters Creek Village
- Katy
- Missouri City
- Piney Point Village
- Southside Place
- Spring Valley Village
- Taylor Lake Village
- West University Place

From 2019 to 2025, Metro also operated a park-and-ride shuttle between Houston and the non-member city Conroe.

== See also ==
- List of tram and light-rail transit systems
