= Northline Transit Center/HCC =

Light rail station in Houston, Texas, US

Coordinates: 29.8325°N 95.3760°W

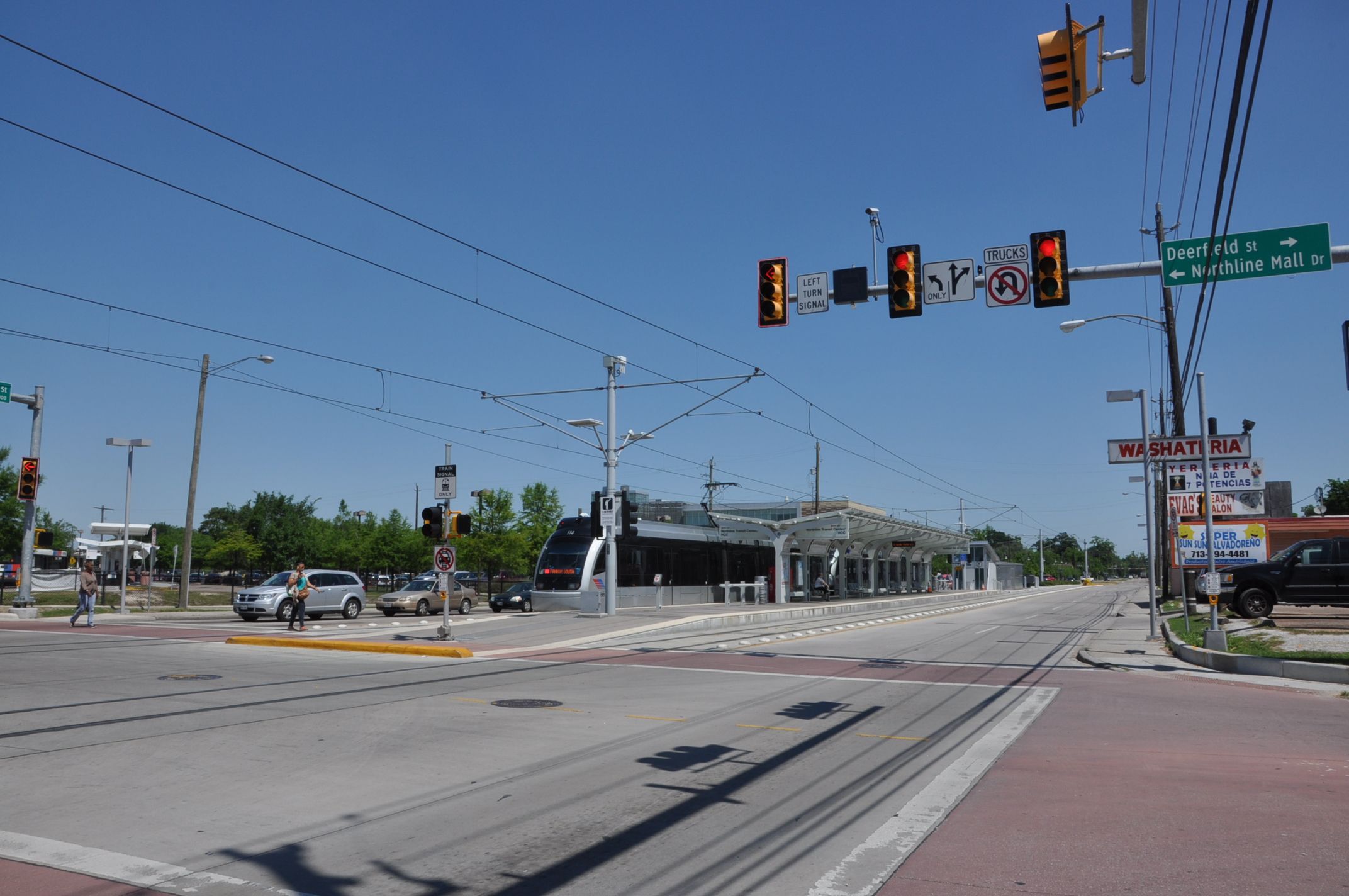

General information
- Location: 7705 Fulton Street; Houston, Texas, US
- Owner: Metropolitan Transit Authority of Harris County
- Line: Red Line
- Platforms: Island platform
- Tracks: 2
- Connections: METRO: 23, 36, 45, 56, 79, 96

Construction
- Parking: 50 spaces
- Cycle facilities: 9 covered spaces
- Accessible: Yes

History
- Opened: December 21, 2013; 12 years ago

Passengers
- June 2026: 2,281 (avg. weekday ridership) (METRO Q Card)

Services
Preceding station	METRORail	Following station
Melbourne/North Lindale toward Fannin South	Red Line	Terminus
Location

The Northline Transit Center/HCC (abbreviated Northline/HCC) is an intermodal transit center in the Northline neighborhood of Houston, Texas. The transit center is operated by the Metropolitan Transit Authority of Harris County (METRO), serving six bus routes and the Red Line of its METRORail system.

The transit center is located on Fulton Street near the Northline Commons shopping center and Houston Community College Northline campus. It is one of only three METRORail stations to be outside of the I-610 loop, the others being Melbourne/North Lindale and Fannin South.

Rail platforms are in the median of the street, while bus platforms are located on the west side of the street. Limited parking, leased by METRO from HCC, is available next to the bus platforms. A dedicated parking garage on the east side of the street has been proposed.

As of May 2025, Northline/HCC has the highest weekend ridership of all METRORail stations, with an average of 1,761 riders on Saturdays and 1,600 riders on Sundays.

== Bus connections ==
All routes connect at the Northline Transit Center.

- 23 Clay-West 43rd
- 36 Kempwood
- 45 Tidwell
- 56 Airline/Montrose
- 79 Irvington
- 96 Veterans Memorial
