= Fannin South station =

METRORail stop

Fannin South
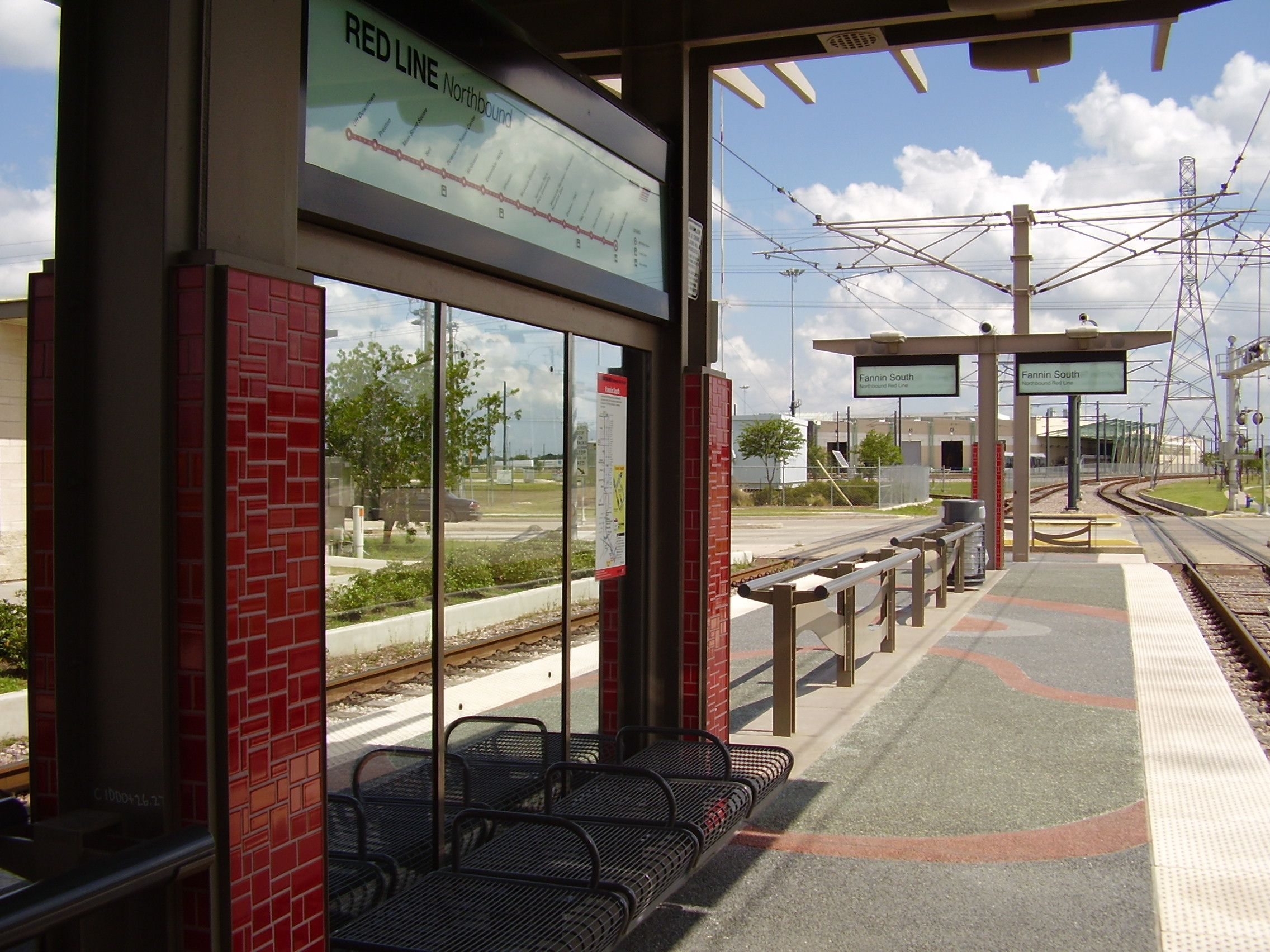
- Fannin South station

General information
- Location: 1604 West Bellfort Avenue; Houston, Texas
- Coordinates: 29°40′25″N 95°24′10″W
- Owner: METRO
- Line: Red Line
- Platforms: Island
- Tracks: Two
- Connections: METRO bus 8, 11, 73, 87

Construction
- Structure type: At-grade
- Parking: Yes, fee required
- Accessible: Yes

History
- Opened: January 1, 2004; 22 years ago

Services
| Preceding station | METRORail | Following station |
|---|---|---|
| Terminus | Red Line | Stadium Park/Astrodome toward Northline Transit Center/HCC |
Location

Fannin South is an island platformed METRORail light rail station in Houston, Texas, United States. The station was opened on January 1, 2004, and is operated by the Metropolitan Transit Authority of Harris County, Texas (METRO). Serving as the southern terminus of the Red Line, this is located at the intersection of Fannin Street and West Bellfort Avenue, and is co-located with the Fannin South Transit Center facility, which is located close to Interstate 610.

== Services ==
The single island platform, includes two shelters are located on the platform covering small seating areas, featuring custom made ceramic panels created by artist Jonathan Brown. In having 1,437 spaces, this station is the only one along the Red Line with a designated parking facility operated by METRO (although others are located near private lots garages). The trip to the Northline Transit Center/HCC takes 52 minutes with trains operating a six-minute intervals during weekdays, at twelve-minute intervals during the evenings and weekend mornings/afternoons, and at twenty-minute intervals at night.

== History ==
In December 1999, METRO officially announced the proposed alignment of what would become Houston's first light rail line. At the time of its announcement, METRO had conceptually indicated that there would be a station constructed at Fannin South with a park & ride only if an arrangement could not be reached with Harris County to utilize the parking lot at the Astrodome. Ultimately, the station would be constructed and in July 2001 the station was officially named Fannin South by the METRO Board.

As a result of construction of both the station and METRO's rail yard and shop facility, the city moved forward with a $2.4 million expansion of Fannin Street to allow for easier access to the station from Interstate 610. The station commenced operations on January 1, 2004.

There have been major plans to build a transit-oriented development (or TOD), at the Fannin South station .
