= Cavalcade station =

Light rail station in Houston, Texas, US

Cavalcade

General information
- Location: Fulton Street at Cavalcade Street; Houston, Texas
- Coordinates: 29.8027°N 95.3681°W
- Owner: METRO
- Platforms: 1 island platform
- Tracks: 2
- Connections: METRO Community Connector: Heights Zone and Near Northside Zone

Construction
- Accessible: Yes

History
- Opened: December 21, 2013

Passengers
- June 2026: 543 (avg. weekday ridership)

Services
Preceding station	METRORail	Following station
Moody Park toward Fannin South	Red Line	Lindale Park toward Northline Transit Center/HCC
Location

Cavalcade station is a light rail station on the Red Line of METRORail in Houston, Texas, United States. It opened on December 21, 2013, as part of the Red Line extension. The station has a single island platform.
