= Lindale Park station =

Light rail station in Houston, Texas

Lindale Park

General information
- Location: Northbound: 5312 Fulton Street; Southbound: 5423 Fulton Street; Houston, Texas
- Coordinates: 29.8085°N 95.3695°W
- Owner: Metropolitan Transit Authority of Harris County
- Line: Red Line
- Platforms: Island platform
- Tracks: 2

Construction
- Accessible: Yes

History
- Opened: December 21, 2013; 12 years ago

Passengers
- June 2026: 148 (avg. weekday ridership) (Qcard)

Services
Preceding station	METRORail	Following station
Cavalcade toward Fannin South	Red Line	Melbourne/North Lindale toward Northline Transit Center/HCC
Location

Lindale Park station is a light rail station in the Lindale Park neighborhood of Houston, Texas. The station serves the Red Line of Houston's METRORail system. It is located in the median of Fulton Street, approximately 1/2 mile (0.80 km) southeast of the interchange between I-45 and I-610, and serves local residences.

As of May 2025, Lindale Park has the lowest ridership of all METRORail stations, with an average of 154 riders on weekdays, 117 riders on Saturdays, and 97 riders on Sundays.

The station opened as part of the Red Line Extension on December 21, 2013.
