= Stadium Park/Astrodome station =

Light rail station in Houston, Texas, US

Stadium Park/Astrodome
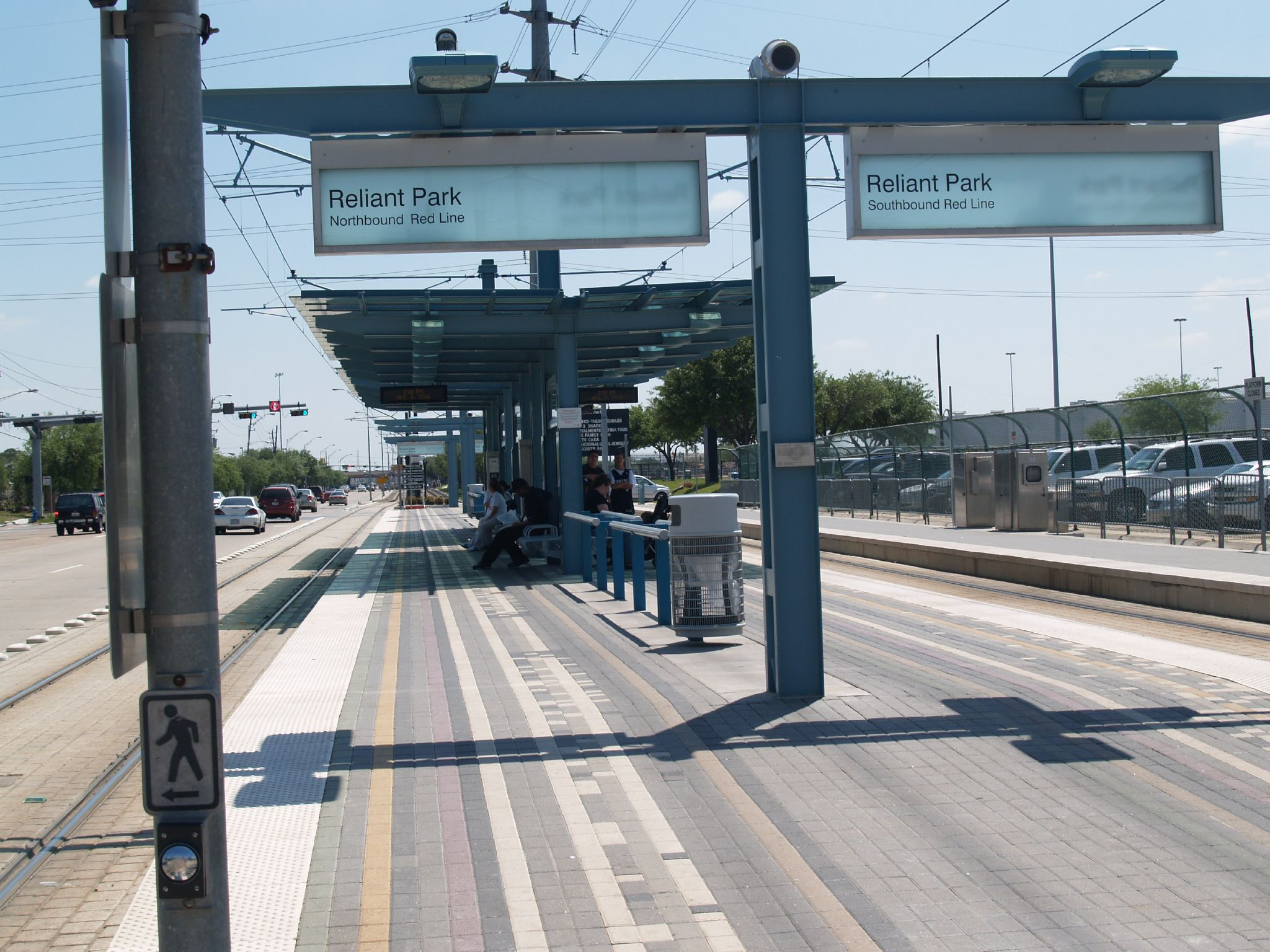

General information
- Location: 8400 block Fannin @ Holly Hall Streets, Houston
- Coordinates: 29°41′9.47″N 95°24′12.19″W
- Owner: METRO
- Line: Red Line
- Platforms: Island
- Tracks: two

Construction
- Parking: private lots nearby
- Accessible: Yes

History
- Opened: January 1, 2004; 22 years ago

Services
Preceding station	METRORail	Following station
Fannin South Terminus	Red Line	Smith Lands toward Northline Transit Center/HCC
Location

Stadium Park/Astrodome is an island platformed METRORail light rail station in Houston, Texas, United States. The station was opened on January 1, 2004, originally as Reliant Park station, and is operated by the Metropolitan Transit Authority of Harris County, Texas (METRO). The station is located at the intersection of Fannin Street and Holly Hall Street, next to Reliant Park. This station is decorated with various photographs from The Astrodome's history including the Rodeo, the Houston Astros and an Elvis concert.

Despite Reliant Park changing its name to NRG Park in 2014, the station continued to bear its former name for two more years. In late 2016, METRO opted not to rename it after NRG, instead changing its name to Stadium Park/Astrodome. The NRG naming rights went to the train station in Philadelphia, Pennsylvania.

Points of interest near Stadium Park/Astrodome Station include convention and entertainment facilities such as the Astrodome, Reliant Stadium, Reliant Arena and Reliant Center. Reliant Stadium is where the NFL team the Houston Texans play. The station served Six Flags AstroWorld until the park closed in October 2005. The station also serves commuters working downtown or in the Texas Medical Center area, many of whom live in large apartment and condominium complexes located nearby.

Stadium Park/Astrodome station includes the only closed platform in the system. The station has a second platform on the Southbound Side opposite the island platform that is not in use.
