= The Health Museum =

Coordinates: 29°43′18″N 95°23′10″W

John P. McGovern Museum of Health and Medical Science
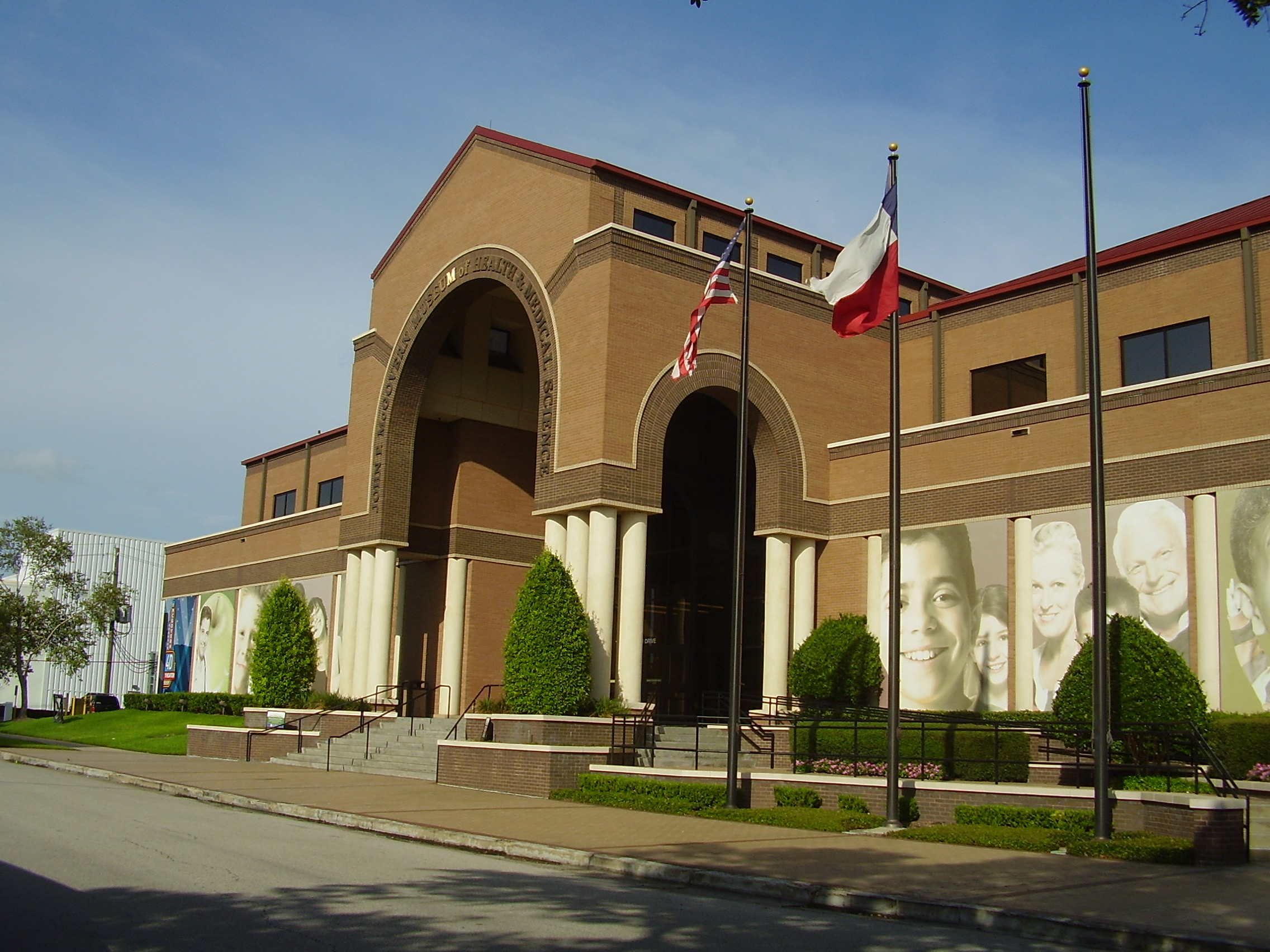
- Photograph from 2009 prior to renovation.
- Established: 1969
- Location: Houston, Texas
- Type: Science museum
- Public transit access: Red Line Museum District
- Website: www.thehealthmuseum.org

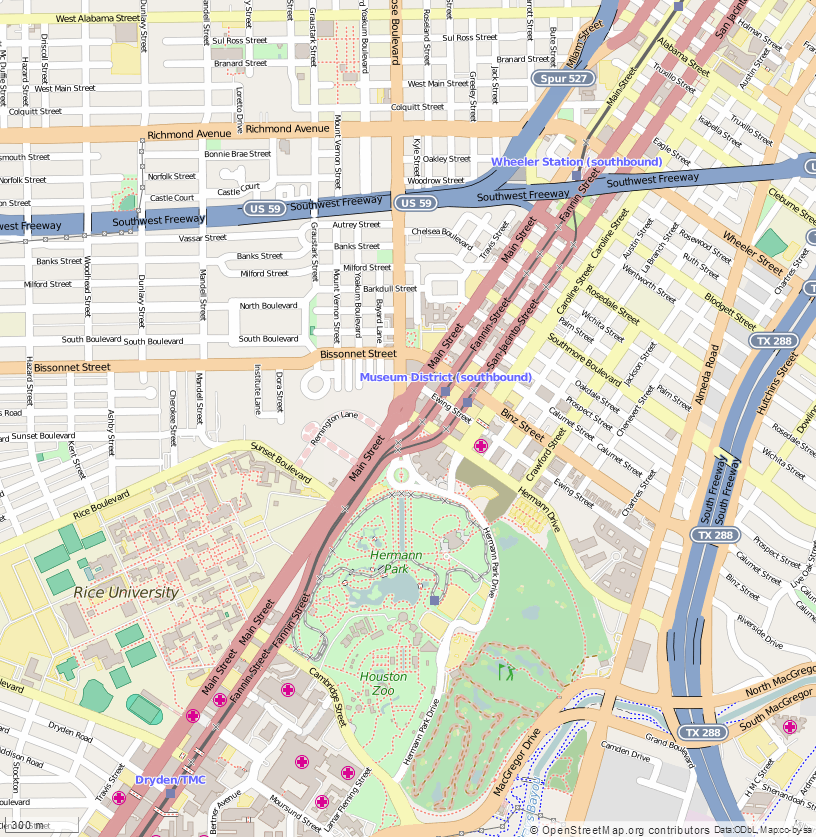
Location within Houston Museum District

The John P. McGovern Museum of Health and Medical Science, or The Health Museum in short, is a museum in the Museum District of Houston, Texas. The museum is a member institution of the Texas Medical Center. As of 2012 the museum gets over 180,000 annual visitors, including 22,000 schoolchildren who visit the facility during organized field trips.

== History ==
The Museum of Medical Science opened in the Houston Museum of Natural Science on November 16, 1969, and it remained there for 21 years. The current museum facility opened on March 16, 1996, as The Museum of Health & Medical Science. The building housing the museum, the John P. McGovern Building, was funded with a $9.5 million capital campaign. Since its opening, the museum has processed over two million visitors. In late 2001 the museum's board of trustees unanimously voted to rename the museum after John P. McGovern. The museum revamped its brand in 2006, as part of the 10th anniversary of the standalone facility. The new branding included a shortened name ("The Health Museum") and a new logo. As of 2006 the museum received 175,000 annual visitors.

A 2011 renovation included the addition of 3,300 SF of exhibition space to the southwest side of the museum with a metal-panel facade and 1,500 SF of additional interior renovations.

Permanent exhibit space for the DeBakey Cell Lab opened in 2015. The DeBakey Cell Lab is a unique science-focused experience and the only bilingual science lab museum exhibit in the country. Honorably named after the respected and accomplished medical pioneer, Michael E. DeBakey, M.D., this 2,000 sq. ft. exhibit features seven authentic biology-based science experiments developed for visitors ages 7 to adult.

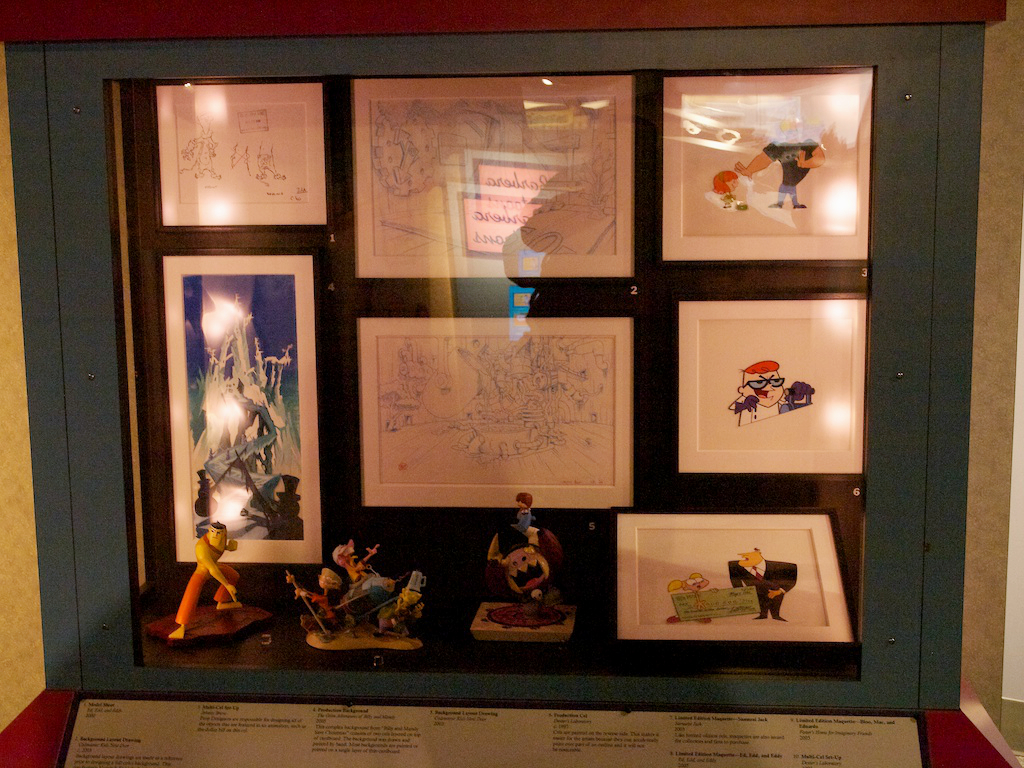
The 2010 Animation exhibit featuring characters from Cartoon Network was once present in the Health Museum.
