= Smith Lands station =

Light rail station in Houston, Texas

Smith Lands
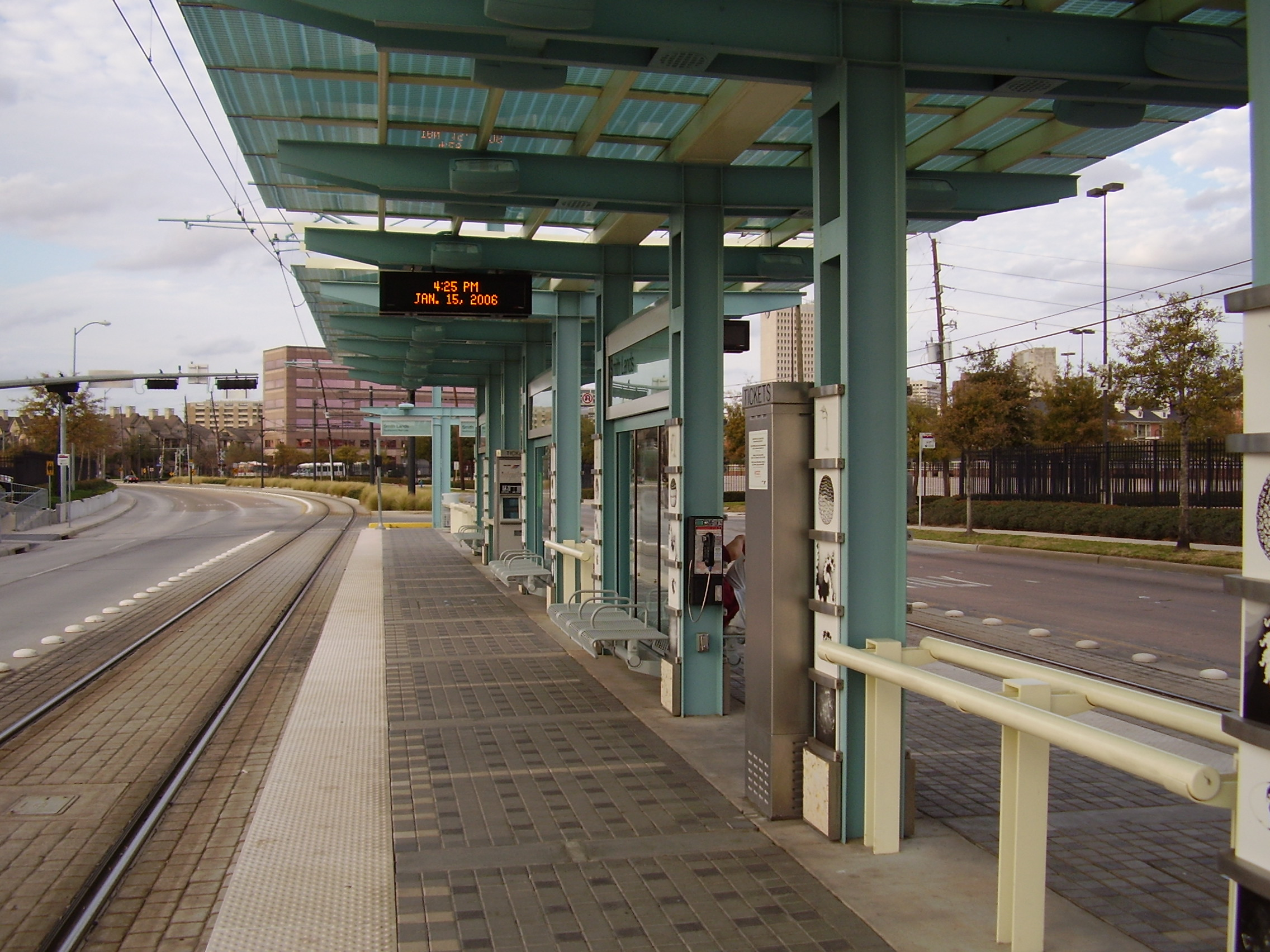

General information
- Location: 7900 block of Greenbriar Drive @ Colonnade, Houston
- Coordinates: 29°41′47.32″N 95°24′17.21″W
- Owner: METRO
- Line: Red Line
- Platforms: 1 island platform
- Tracks: 2

Construction
- Accessible: Yes

History
- Opened: January 1, 2004; 22 years ago

Services
Preceding station	METRORail	Following station
Stadium Park/Astrodome toward Fannin South	Red Line	Texas Medical Center Transit Center toward Northline Transit Center/HCC
Location

Smith Lands is an island platformed METRORail light rail station in Houston, Texas, United States. The station was opened on January 1, 2004 and is operated by the Metropolitan Transit Authority of Harris County, Texas (METRO). The station is located south of the Texas Medical Center at the intersection of Greenbriar Drive and Colonnade Drive; Old Spanish Trail crosses Greenbriar Drive approximately one block south of the station.

Smith Lands Station feeds commuter traffic into the Texas Medical Center area, and services the adjacent Smith Lands commuter parking facility as well as several nearby apartment and condominium complexes. Other facilities located nearby include Texas Woman's Hospital, M.D. Anderson Cancer Center's Proton Therapy Center (see also: proton therapy) and office buildings serving several oil companies.

Smith Lands Station and the attached commuter parking facility are also used occasionally as part of an off-site event parking site for Houston Texans football games and the annual Houston Livestock Show and Rodeo as well as major concert, sporting and other events taking place at NRG Park, which is located 0.8 miles (1.3 km) to the south next to Stadium Park/Astrodome station.

There is talk of building a parking garage, and using the surface lots as a redevelopment project, including residential units, office and maybe a hotel.
