= Museum District =

Museum District may refer to one of several districts in various cities, so named for their concentration of museums:

- Museum District, Philadelphia, Pennsylvania
- Houston Museum District in Houston, Texas

- Museum District (METRORail station) in said district of Houston

- Museum District, Richmond, Virginia
- Museum Planning Area in Singapore
