= Moody Park station =

Light rail station in Houston, Texas, U.S.

Moody Park

General information
- Location: Fulton Street at Catherine Street; Houston, Texas
- Coordinates: 29.7954°N 95.3659°W
- Owner: METRO
- Platforms: 1 island platform
- Tracks: 2
- Connections: METRO Community Connector: Near Northside Zone

Construction
- Accessible: Yes

History
- Opened: December 21, 2013

Passengers
- June 2026: 442 (avg. weekday ridership)

Services
Preceding station	METRORail	Following station
Fulton/North Central toward Fannin South	Red Line	Cavalcade toward Northline Transit Center/HCC
Location

Moody Park station is a light rail station on METRORail's Red Line in Houston, Texas, United States. It opened as part of the Red Line extension on December 21, 2013. The station has a single island platform.
