= N Train =

N Train could refer to:

- The N (New York City Subway service)
- The N Judah in San Francisco
- N Red Line in Houston
- N scale for model railroads
