= Fulton/North Central station =

Light rail station in Houston, Texas, US

Fulton/North Central
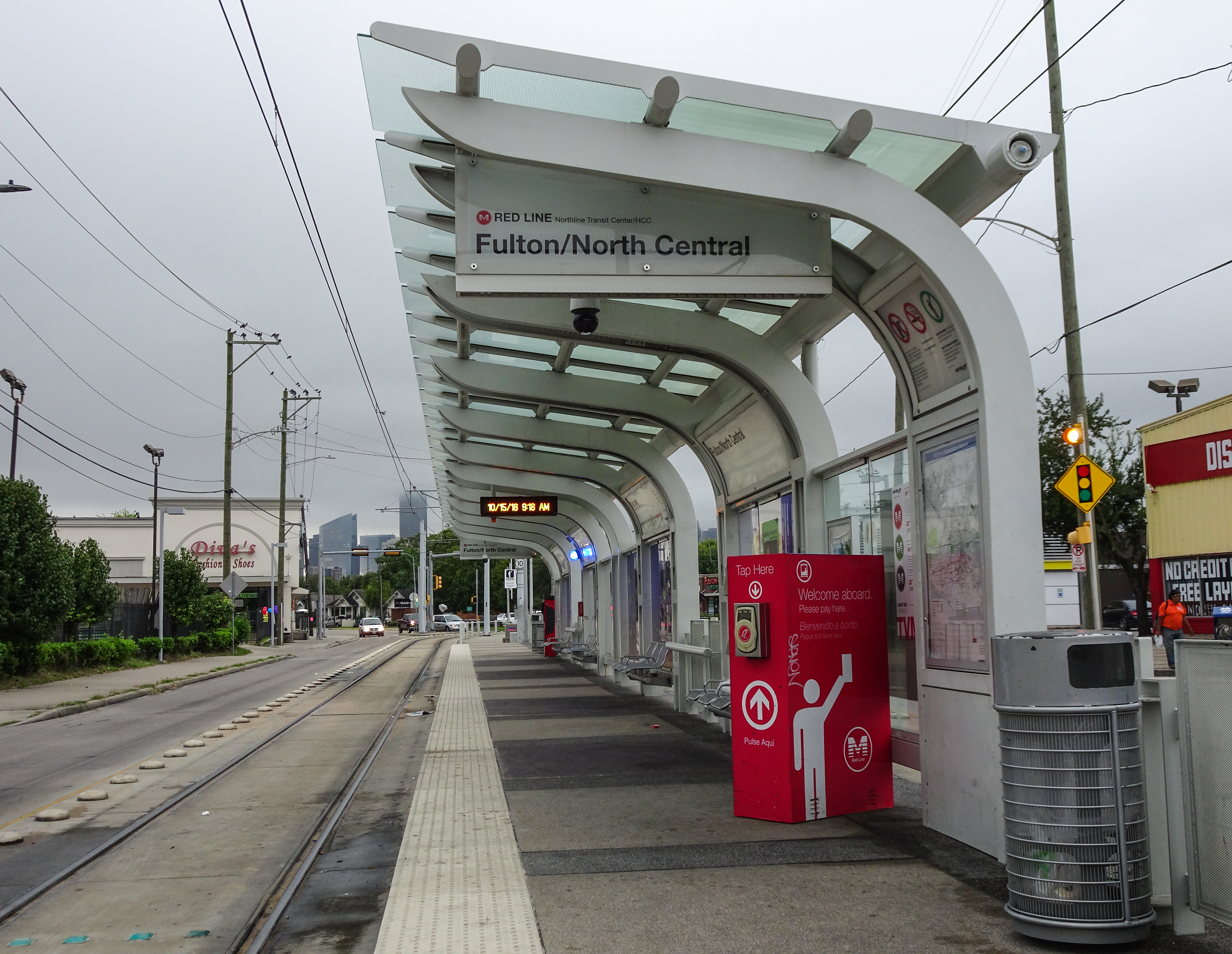
- The station in October 2018

General information
- Location: Fulton Street at Panama Street; Houston, Texas
- Coordinates: 29.7858°N 95.3607°W
- Owner: METRO
- Platforms: 2 side platforms
- Tracks: 2
- Connections: METRO Community Connector: Near Northside Zone

Construction
- Accessible: Yes

History
- Opened: December 21, 2013

Passengers
- June 2026: 802 (avg. weekday ridership)

Services
Preceding station	METRORail	Following station
Quitman/Near Northside toward Fannin South	Red Line	Moody Park toward Northline Transit Center/HCC
Location

Fulton/North Central station is a light rail station on METRORail's Red Line in Houston, Texas, United States. It opened as part of the Red Line extension on December 21, 2013.

The station has a split center platform – an island platform with each half of its length serving trains in one direction.
