= Copa de Tejas =

Copa De Tejas
- Founded: 2003
- Region: Houston, Texas
- Teams: 3
- Current champions: América (2004)
- Most championships: Cruz Azul, América (1)

Copa de Tejas
Cup of Texas

Tournament details
- Country: United States
- Teams: 3

Final positions
- Champions: Club América
- Runners-up: Everton

Tournament statistics
- Matches played: 2
- Goals scored: 11 (5.5 per match)

The Copa de Tejas (English: Cup of Texas) was a soccer tournament held in Houston. All games were played at the Reliant Stadium, home of the NFL's Houston Texans.

The participants were Club América, Everton and Pachuca.

29 July 2004

Pachuca (Mexico)	2 - 5	(England) Everton

The Reliant Stadium, Houston
1 August 2004

Club América (Mexico)	3 - 1	(England) Everton

The Reliant Stadium, Houston

2004 Copa de Tejas winners

Mexico
First title

The Copa De Tejas was a preseason summer soccer tournament hosted by the Houston Texans NFL franchise at Reliant Stadium. The tournament featured clubs from Liga MX and the Premier League. The tournament was created to help establish the Reliant Stadium as a soccer venue, as well as persuade Major League Soccer to award an expansion franchise to the Houston market, which was awarded in 2006 with the Houston Dynamo.

There were two preseason tournaments held, in 2003 and 2004. Mexican side, Cruz Azul won the first tournament, and fellow Mexican outfit, Club América won the second and final tournament.

== Past champions ==
Year	Winner	Runner-up	Third place
2003	(Mexico) Cruz Azul		
2004	(Mexico) América	(England) Everton	(Mexico) Pachuca
