= Melbourne/North Lindale station =

Melbourne/North Lindale

General information
- Location: Fulton Street at Melbourne Street; Houston, Texas
- Coordinates: 29.8158°N 95.3705°W
- Owner: METRO
- Platforms: 1 island platform
- Tracks: 2

Construction
- Accessible: Yes

History
- Opened: December 21, 2013

Passengers
- June 2026: 252 (avg. weekday ridership)

Services
Preceding station	METRORail	Following station
Lindale Park toward Fannin South	Red Line	Northline Transit Center/HCC Terminus
Location

Melbourne/North Lindale station is a METRORail light rail station in Houston, Texas. It serves the Red Line and opened as part of the Red Line extension on December 21, 2013. The station has a single island platform.
