= Museum District station =

Light rail station in Houston, Texas

Coordinates: 29°43′27.69″N 95°23′17.57″W

Museum District
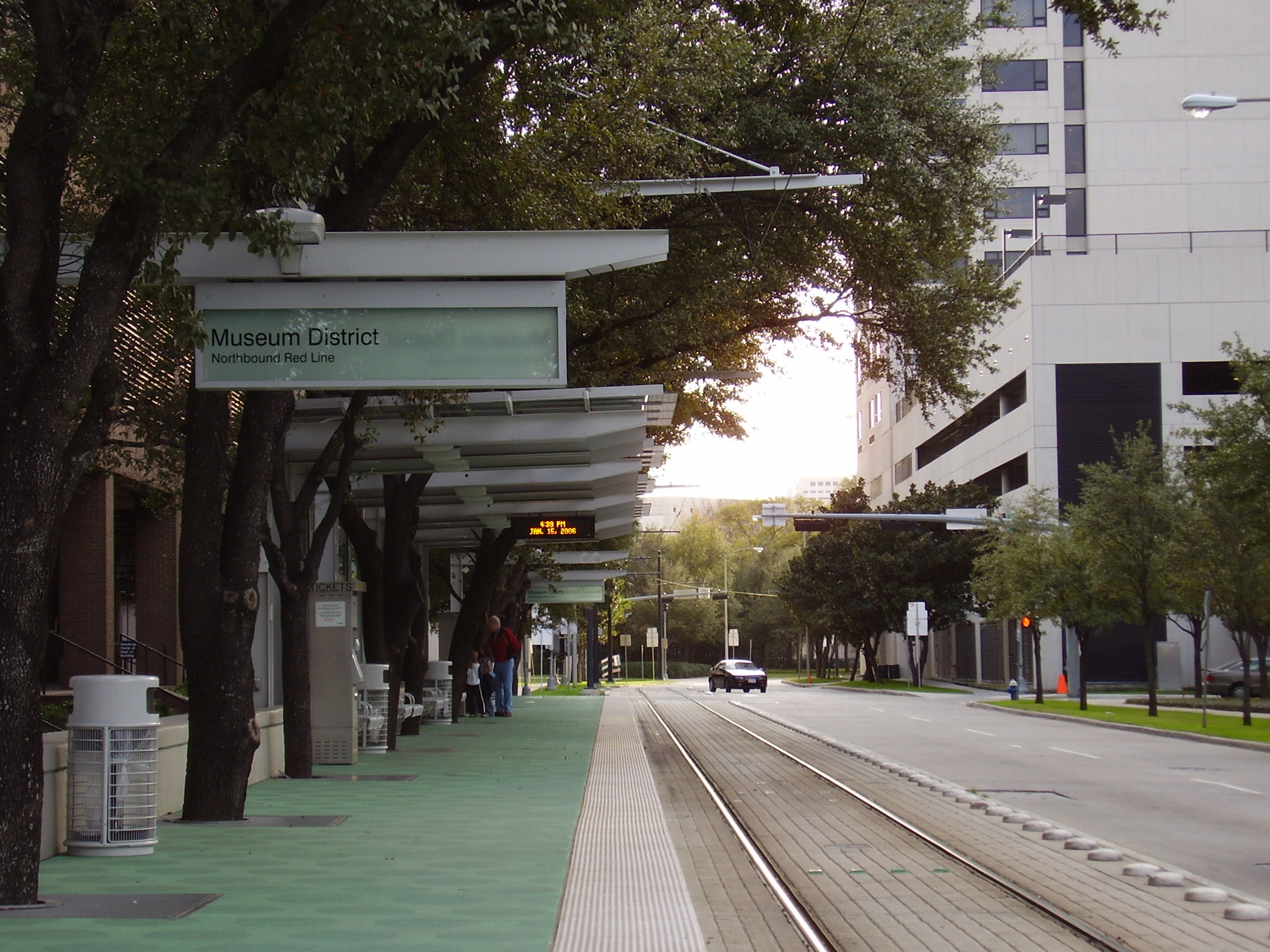
- northbound platform

General information
- Location: Northbound: 5640 San Jacinto Street; Southbound: 5660 Fannin Street; Houston, Texas
- Owner: Metropolitan Transit Authority of Harris County
- Line: Red Line
- Platforms: 2 side platforms
- Tracks: 2
- Connections: METRO: 5, 65, 292

Construction
- Accessible: Yes

History
- Opened: January 1, 2004; 22 years ago

Services
Preceding station	METRORail	Following station
Hermann Park/Rice University toward Fannin South	Red Line	Wheeler toward Northline Transit Center/HCC
Location

Museum District Station is a light rail station in south-central Houston, Texas, United States. The station serves the Red Line of Houston's METRORail system. The station is located in the southern end of the Houston Museum District, a neighborhood containing Houston's largest museums. Institutions near the station include the Museum of Fine Arts, Houston, the Children's Museum of Houston, Holocaust Museum Houston, The Health Museum, and the Houston Museum of Natural Science.

The station's northbound and southbound are located on separate, parallel one-way streets (San Jacinto Street and Fannin Street, respectively) on opposite sides of the Museum of Fine Arts, Houston Visitor Center. Museum District is one of four METRORail stations and the only Red Line station with such a layout.

== History ==
Plans for a rail line along Main and Fannin Streets, which would pass through the Museum District while connecting Downtown and Texas Medical Center, date to 1990. Construction began on the line, including the Museum District station, in 2001.

Museum District was the only station on the Main Street line to place its northbound and southbound stations on separate streets. This was done to maximize the number of lanes open on Fannin Street, which needed to be kept high-capacity to offset a narrowing of the nearby Main Street. Glass canopies at the station were decorated with abstract art by artist Maggi Battalino.

The station, along with the rest of the line, opened on January 1, 2004. To tie in with the opening, the nearby Children's Museum of Houston opened an exhibit on the science of transportation.
