= Reliant Stadium =

Stadium in Houston, Texas

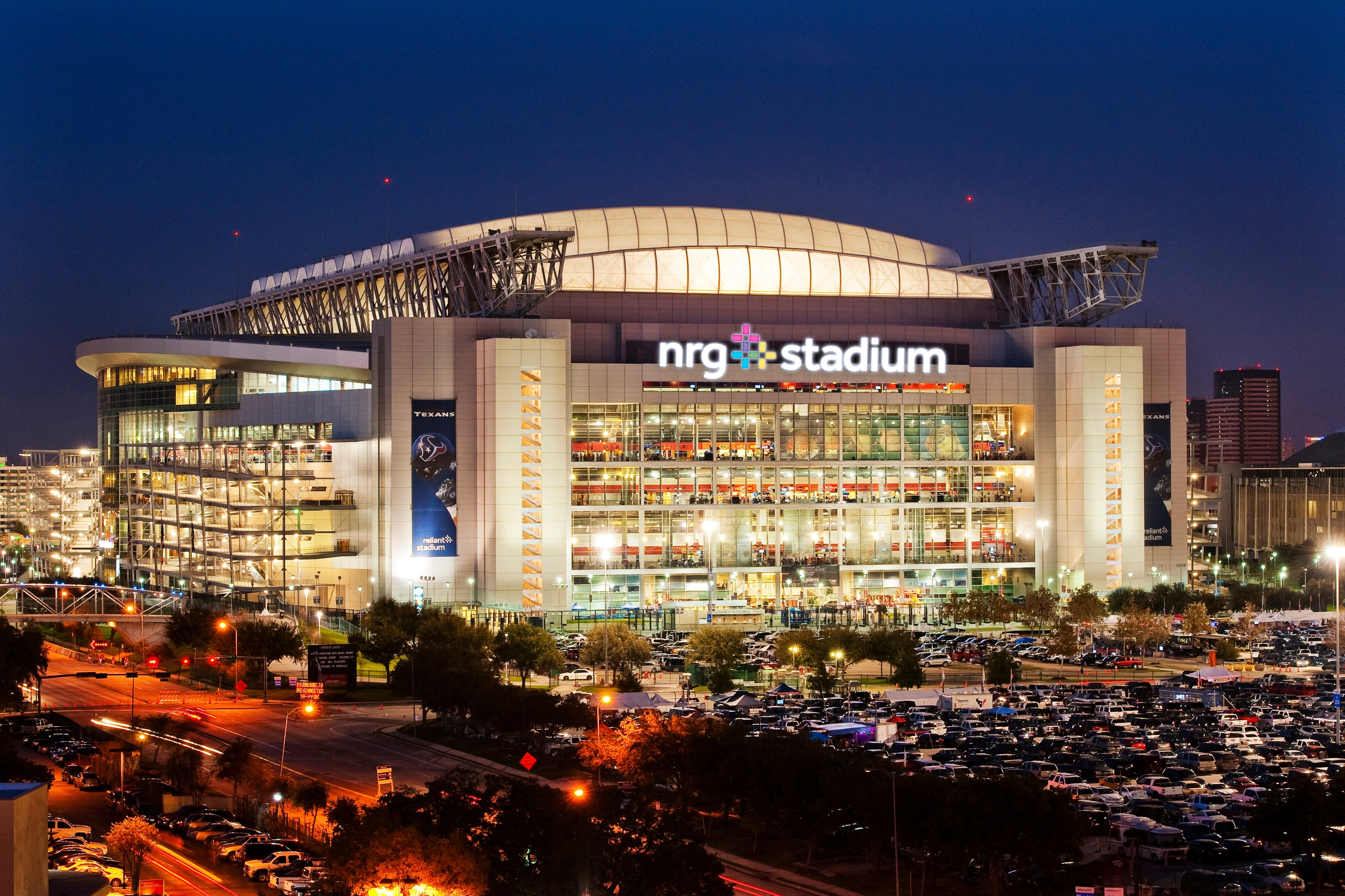
- The stadium, then called NRG Stadium, at night in 2024

- Location in Texas Location in the United States
- Former names: Reliant Stadium (2002–2014, 2026–present); NRG Stadium (2014–2026); Houston Stadium (2026 FIFA World Cup)
- Address: 1 Reliant Parkway
- Location: Houston, Texas, U.S.
- Coordinates: 29°41′5″N 95°24′39″W
- Owner: Harris County Sports & Convention Corporation (HCSCC)
- Operator: ASM Global
- Capacity: 72,220 (2018–present); Expandable to 80,000 for special events Former capacity: List: 71,795 (2014–2017); 71,054 (2003–2013); 69,500 (2002); 68,777 (2026 FIFA World Cup)
- Executive suites: 196
- Roof: Retractable
- Surface: Hellas Matrix Helix
- Record attendance: 80,210 – Ye (Kanye West), October 31, 2026
- Public transit: Stadium Park/Astrodome

Construction
- Groundbreaking: March 9, 2000
- Opened: August 24, 2002
- Cost: US$352 million ($630 million in 2025 dollars)
- Architects: HOK Sport; Houston Stadium Consultants (Architect-of-Record) a joint venture with Lockwood, Andrews & Newnam and Hermes Architects
- Structural engineer: Walter P. Moore
- Services engineers: M-E Engineers, Inc.
- General contractor: Manhattan/Beers (a joint venture)

Tenants
- Houston Texans (NFL) (2002–present); Houston Livestock Show and Rodeo (2003–present); Texas Bowl (NCAA) (2006–present); Texas Kickoff Game (NCAA) (2013–2021); Houston Cougars (NCAA) (2013)

Website
- reliantpark.com

Reliant Stadium, previously known as NRG Stadium, is a retractable roof stadium in Houston, Texas, U.S. It opened in 2002 at a cost of $352 million and has a seating capacity of 72,220. It was the first NFL facility to have a retractable roof.

The stadium is the home of the National Football League's Houston Texans, the Houston Livestock Show and Rodeo, the Texas Bowl, many of the United States men's national soccer team's matches, Mexico national football team friendlies where El Tri serves as the host, and other events. The stadium served as the host facility for Super Bowls XXXVIII (2004) and LI (2017), the 2024 College Football Playoff National Championship, and WrestleMania 25 (2009). The stadium hosted multiple matches during the 2026 FIFA World Cup and was temporarily renamed Houston Stadium during the tournament, with the 'neutralization' of the stadium providing an opportunity to transition the venue back to its previous Reliant Stadium name prior to the start of the 2026 NFL season.

Reliant Stadium is part of a collection of venues (including the Astrodome), which are collectively called Reliant Park. The entire complex is named for Reliant Energy under a 32-year, $300 million naming rights deal in 2000.

== History ==
The Houston NFL Holdings group came to HOK Sport (now Populous) to begin the schematic design for the first-ever NFL retractable roof football stadium in 1997. The intention was to create a football stadium to replace the Astrodome that would operate like an open-air facility but have the intimacy and comfort of an indoor arena. With the design for football and the square footage requirements of the rodeo, the building was designed in the 1.9-million-square-foot (180,000 m^{2}) range. Groundbreaking for the stadium was on March 9, 2000, and the building was officially topped off in October 2001. Construction was completed in 30 months.

The stadium opened on August 24, 2002 with the name Reliant Stadium, with a preseason game between the Miami Dolphins and Houston Texans which the Dolphins won 24–3. The stadium hosted its first regular season NFL football game between the Dallas Cowboys and the Houston Texans on September 8, 2002, which the Texans won against their interstate rival 19–10. The first rodeo was held in the stadium in February 2003.

During a Texans preseason game on August 30, 2012, against the Minnesota Vikings, an intoxicated fan fell to his death from an escalator.

On March 19, 2014, the stadium was renamed NRG Stadium, after NRG Energy, the parent company of Reliant Energy.

During the 2015 season, a permanent artificial surface was installed at NRG Stadium. The Texans had used a natural surface since the stadium opened, using a system of trays of sod similar to one used at Giants Stadium in its experiment with using a grass surface. In recent years, the stadium installed artificial turf to be used during high school and college games while keeping the grass for Texans games. After the Texans' home opener, complaints about the field conditions finally led to the installation of the artificial surface for Texans games. The surface brand is UBU Speed, which is part of Act Global.

In 2017, NRG Stadium selected Hellas Construction to install its Matrix Turf with Helix Technology at the stadium. The three year contract calls for a new turf field each year.

After hosting Super Bowl LI, further upgrades were made to keep NRG Stadium competitive with other new NFL venues. The stadium's first major renovation in 15 years modernized the office and team facilities.

On April 19, 2023, Harris County Judge Lina Hidalgo renamed NRG Stadium to NRG Stadium (Taylor's Version) to celebrate Taylor Swift's Eras Tour dates at NRG Stadium from April 21–23.

On December 25, 2024, the first ever halftime show for the NFL's Christmas Gameday was headlined by Houston native Beyoncé at NRG Stadium.

The stadium's commercial signage was removed in April 2026 as part of the 'neutralization' process for the stadium to host the 2026 FIFA World Cup, where it was Houston Stadium. In connection with this, NRG announced on April 15, 2026 the restoration of the former Reliant Stadium and Reliant Park names after the tournament's end as a result of team and company polling supporting a return to the stadium's original moniker, and updated Reliant signage installed after the World Cup and before the first Texans game of the 2026 preseason.

=== Hurricane Ike damage ===
On the night of September 12–13, 2008, the stadium sustained damage from Hurricane Ike, forcing the Houston Texans home opener scheduled for September 14 to be postponed. Part of the roof cladding came off, and there was wind and water damage to other sections of the stadium. There were also large pieces of debris inside the stadium from the hurricane and the stadium authority declared that the stadium did not suffer significant structural damage except for the roof, and the Texans would be able to play all of their 8 home games at Reliant Stadium with the roof open.

The Texans' home opener against the Baltimore Ravens was initially postponed one day from Sunday, September 14, 2008, to Monday, September 15, but when the extent of the damage from Hurricane Ike became known, the NFL rescheduled the Texans-Ravens game to week 10 (November 9, 2008), which was to have been the bye week for the Ravens and the Texans' scheduled home game against the Cincinnati Bengals. That game was rescheduled to week 8 (October 26), which was to have been the bye week for both the Texans and Bengals. The Bengals' bye week was moved from October 26. The Texans and Ravens took their unexpected bye week in week 2, the weekend Hurricane Ike hit East Texas and the Gulf Coast, despite the fact that both teams were preparing that whole week to play that game as scheduled.

The stadium reopened on October 5, 2008, when the Texans hosted the Indianapolis Colts and hosted three additional home games in October.

The stadium was repaired by Houston-based rope access inspection and construction firm Reel Group Americas on February 13, 2009.

== Design and technology ==
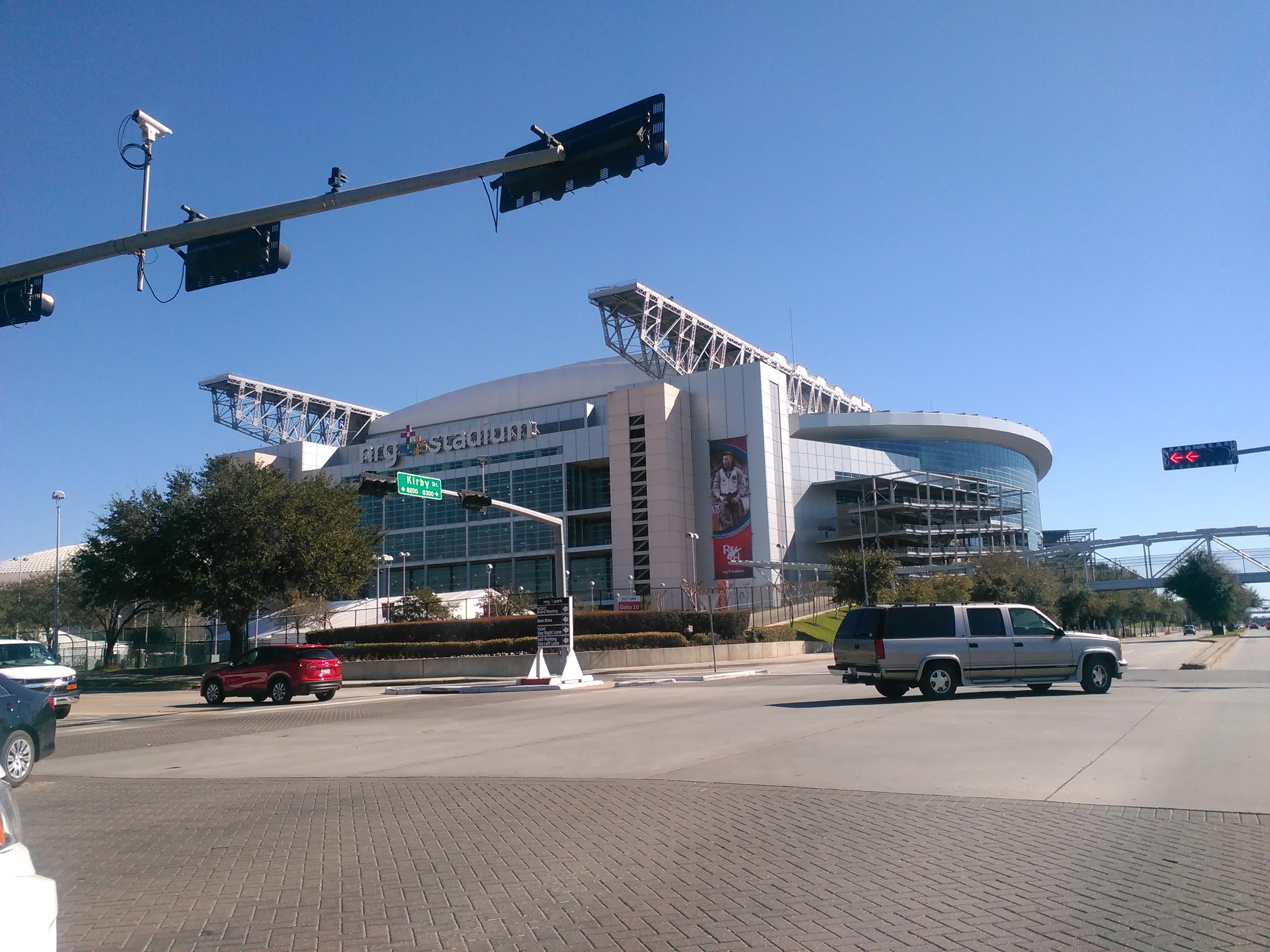
Street view

The stadium was designed by the architectural firms of Hermes Reed Architects and Lockwood, Andrews and Newnam who were teamed to create the Houston Stadium Consultants (HSC). The architects of Populous (then HOK Sport) and the HSC worked together with engineers from Walter P Moore and Uni-Systems to design the stadium utilizing the principles of kinetic architecture. The facility offers a sense of transparency, with its fabric roof and expansive areas of glazing. At night, the building appears to glow from within. The extensive use of glass provides an open-air feel to the concourses, which are open to the field of play. Reliant Stadium has over 7,000 club seats, 186 luxury suites, and multiple lounges and bars. The stadium can be configured to utilize a 125,000-square-foot (11,600 m^{2}) space for meetings, specialty functions, exhibits, and concerts.

One of the most notable aspects of the design is the stadium's retractable, fabric roof. The roof mechanization consists of two large panels that split apart at the 50 yard line, lying over and above each end zone when fully retracted. 10 parallel, tri-chord trusses ride on two parallel rails, each supported by a large, 675 feet (206 m)-long super-truss. Roof operation is controlled in the stadium press box via computer, containing live images of the travel path of each roof panel; plus, furnishing live feedback from all roof components throughout the operation. The roof panels can be opened or closed in as little as 7 minutes, moving at a speed of up to 35 feet (11 m)-per-minute.

One bleacher section behind the north end zone, called the "Bull Pen", is the designated fan section for the hometeam. The fans in the Bull Pen interact directly with the action on the field, helping to create and implement fan traditions, songs, chants, and other elements of the game-day experience for spectators all over the stadium. Fans in the Bull Pen are encouraged to stand throughout the game, sing, cheer, and otherwise support the team in an enthusiastic manner.

In 2011, Reliant updated their logo and therefore had to update their signage all over the stadium.

In December 2012, it was announced that, in order to help bring the Super Bowl back to Houston, the stadium's end zone displays would be replaced with the largest digital displays in any professional sports venue. The video screens were revealed August 16, 2013 and are the second largest of their kind, at a total of 14,549 square feet (1,351.6 m^{2}) of screens. This tops the previous record of AT&T Stadium in Arlington. This has since been topped by the digital display boards located in EverBank Stadium, the home of the Jacksonville Jaguars, now home to the largest digital display boards in any stadium in the world.

== Stadium usage ==
=== Sports ===
==== Football ====
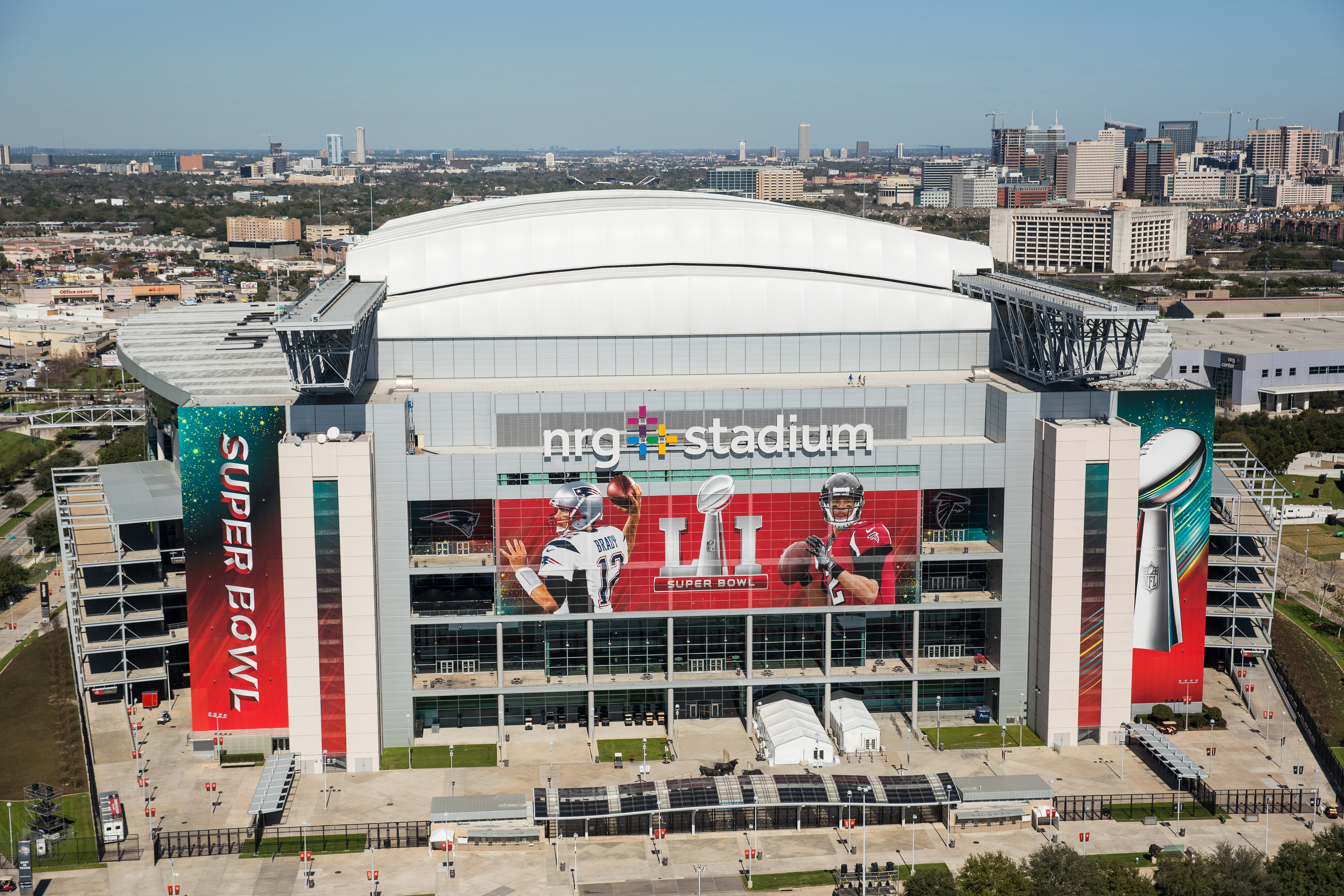
NRG Stadium in Super Bowl LI livery

The Houston Texans have played their home games at Reliant Stadium (or NRG Stadium) since their inception in 2002. The annual calendar consists of 8 or 9 regular season and 1–2 pre-season games, plus any playoff games the Texans host. The first game played was on August 24, 2002, in front of 69,432 in attendance as the Texans hosted the Miami Dolphins in their first preseason game. The first regular season game was played on September 8 of that year, where the expansion Texans defeated the Dallas Cowboys 19–10 in front of 69,604. The first Monday Night Football game in Texans history was held on December 1, 2008, at Reliant Stadium. Playing in front of a then-franchise-record crowd of 70,809, the Texans defeated the Jacksonville Jaguars 30–17. Since then that record crowd has been broken in the next 2 Texans home games of that season. Their December 7, 2008 home game against the Tennessee Titans saw a then-record crowd of 70,831 and the December 28, 2008 home finale against the Chicago Bears drew then a current franchise-crowd record of 70,838. That record was broken on November 23, 2009, when a record crowd of 71,153 was in attendance during the Texans' second ever Monday Night Football game against Houston's former NFL team, the Tennessee Titans. The Texans' home finale of the 2009 season against the New England Patriots on January 3, 2010, drew 71,029.

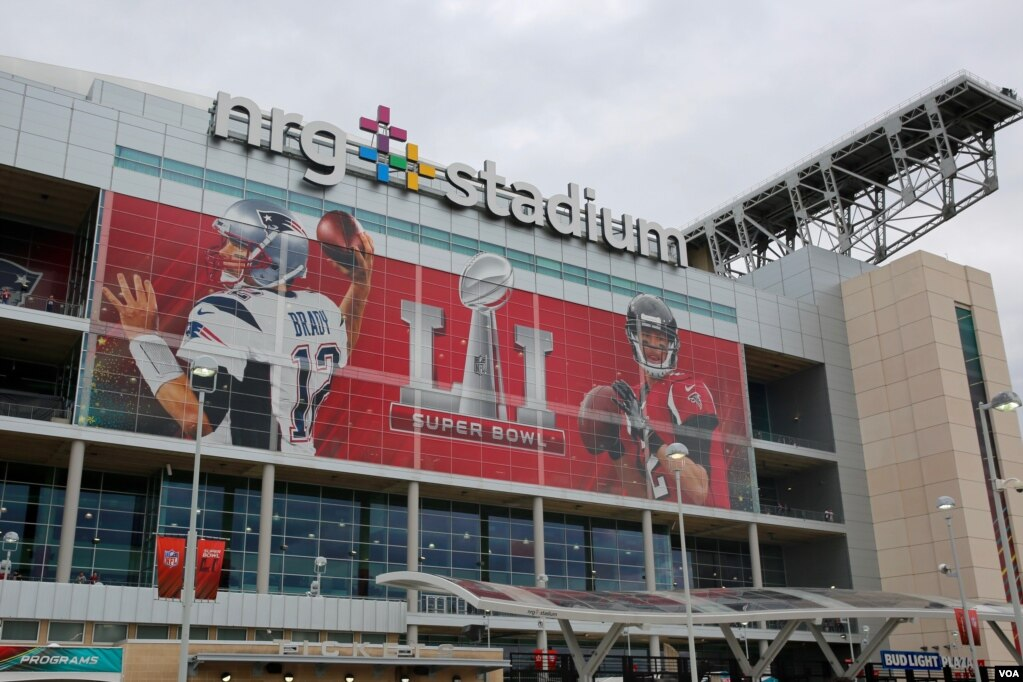
Banners outside before Super Bowl LI

Reliant Stadium has hosted 2 Super Bowls: Super Bowl XXXVIII (which was marred by a controversial halftime show) and Super Bowl LI (which was the first Super Bowl to go into overtime); both games pitted the New England Patriots against a team from the NFC South.

Reliant Stadium hosted Super Bowl XXXVIII on February 1, 2004, where the New England Patriots defeated the Carolina Panthers, 32–29 in front of 71,525 in attendance.

Reliant Stadium hosted the Texans' first playoff game in franchise history on January 7, 2012, with Houston defeating the Cincinnati Bengals 31–10 in an AFC wild card game, drawing 71,725, the largest crowd ever to see a Texans game at Reliant Stadium.

Reliant Stadium hosted Super Bowl LI in 2017, in which the New England Patriots defeated the Atlanta Falcons 34–28 in the biggest comeback in Super Bowl history; it was also the first ever overtime game in Super Bowl history.

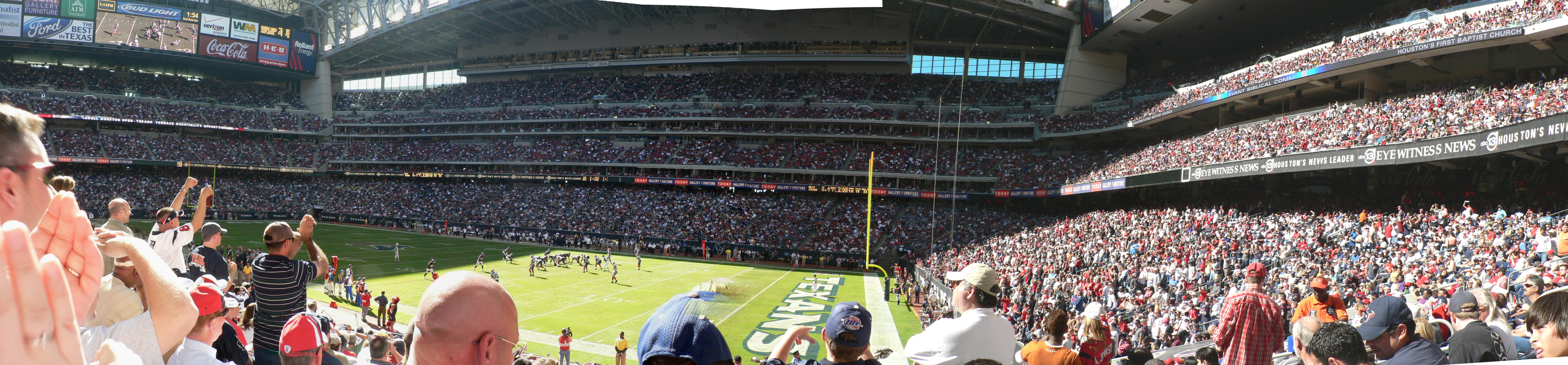
Interior of Reliant Stadium during a Texans game

==== Rodeo ====
The Houston Livestock Show and Rodeo (or RodeoHouston) is a co-tenant of Reliant Stadium. "The building is as much for the rodeo as it is for the National Football League," according to Leroy Shafer who is assistant general manager of the rodeo's marketing department. The rodeo is held three weeks in March, each year. During this time Reliant Stadium also hosts an event on the Xtreme Bulls tour, the bull riding-only tour that is part of the PRCA, who also hosts the Houston Livestock Show and Rodeo.

The stadium includes a service area level to house rodeo livestock. The bulls, broncs, steers and roping calves are housed in the north end of the stadium under the lower bowl. Loading and unloading dock space to support the rodeo is located on the north end of the stadium. During rodeo performances, rolling doors will separate the dock into two receiving areas to isolate the food and concession deliveries from the rodeo equipment and livestock deliveries. A 42-foot (13 m) concert performance stage is located at the south end of the stadium during rodeo events and is moved into the center of the facility by a hydraulic drive system for rodeo concert performances.

On February 25, 2012, the PBR brought its premier bull riding tour, the Built Ford Tough Series, to Reliant Stadium for the first time ever. It was the first time that a PBR event was a part of RodeoHouston. In addition, it was their first event in Houston in 11 years, after having previously held an event at the Compaq Center annually between 1998 and 2001.

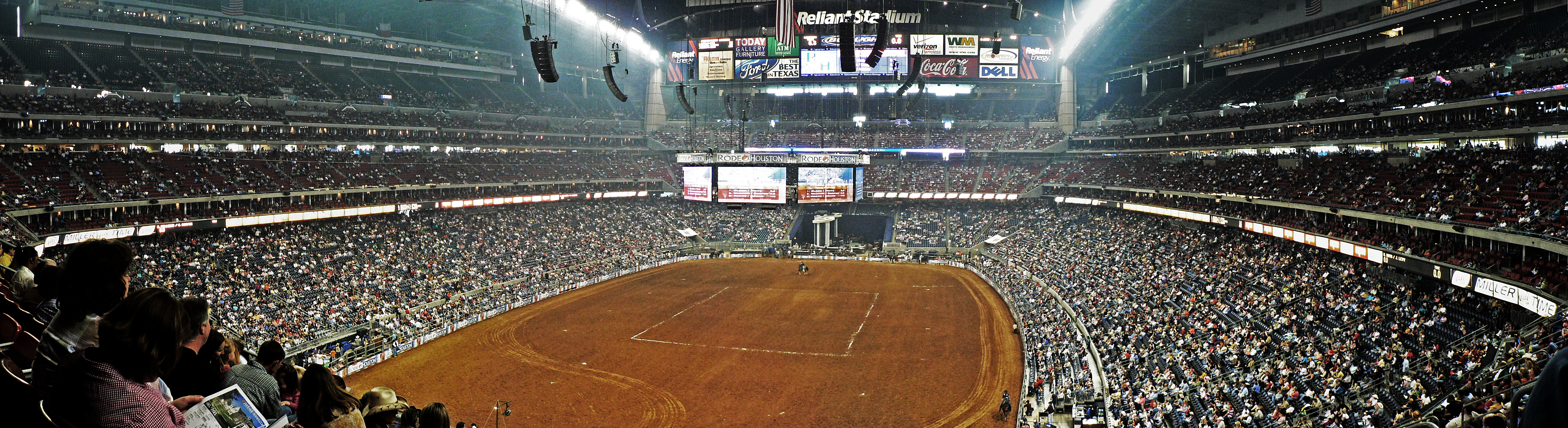
Interior of Reliant Stadium at the 2006 rodeo

==== College football ====
College football's Texas Bowl and Texas Kickoff are annually hosted at the stadium. The first-ever edition of the Texas Bowl featured a game between Rutgers University and Kansas State University, with Rutgers winning 37–10. The stadium hosted the Houston Bowl before the Texas Bowl's inception and also hosted both the 2002 and 2005 Big 12 Championship Games. The 2005 game featured Houston native Vince Young at quarterback for the University of Texas at Austin and led the Longhorns to a 70–3 rout of the University of Colorado in front of 71,107. In addition, the East–West Shrine Game was held there in 2007.

A Bayou Classic game between Grambling State and Southern was held here in November 2005 due to Hurricane Katrina damage at the rivalry's usual venue of the Superdome.

Each of the city's two Division I FBS schools, the University of Houston and Rice University, has played regular season home games at Reliant Stadium in the past. The Houston–Rice football rivalry game, the Bayou Bucket Classic, was held there in 2004, and in 2011, the game was announced to be played at Reliant Stadium for the 2012 and 2013 seasons as well.

The stadium also hosts the "Battle of the Piney Woods" since 2010. It is one of the oldest football rivalries in Texas, featuring Division I FCS Sam Houston State University and Stephen F. Austin State University. The series was originally scheduled to run until 2013, before being extended to 2017, and finally in April 2015, the stadium was made the permanent home of the series.

The two largest historically black universities in Texas, Texas Southern University and Prairie View A&M University, each have played selected regular season home games at Reliant Stadium as well.

The SWAC Championship Game was held at the stadium from 2013 until 2017.

In 2017, Reliant Stadium was announced as a future site for the College Football Playoff National Championship game; it hosted the event on January 8, 2024 (ending the 2023 college football season), which featured the Michigan Wolverines (winners of the Rose Bowl) and the Washington Huskies (winners of the Sugar Bowl).

==== High school football ====
Reliant Stadium is regularly utilized by varsity football teams as a neutral site during the University Interscholastic League football playoffs.

==== Soccer ====
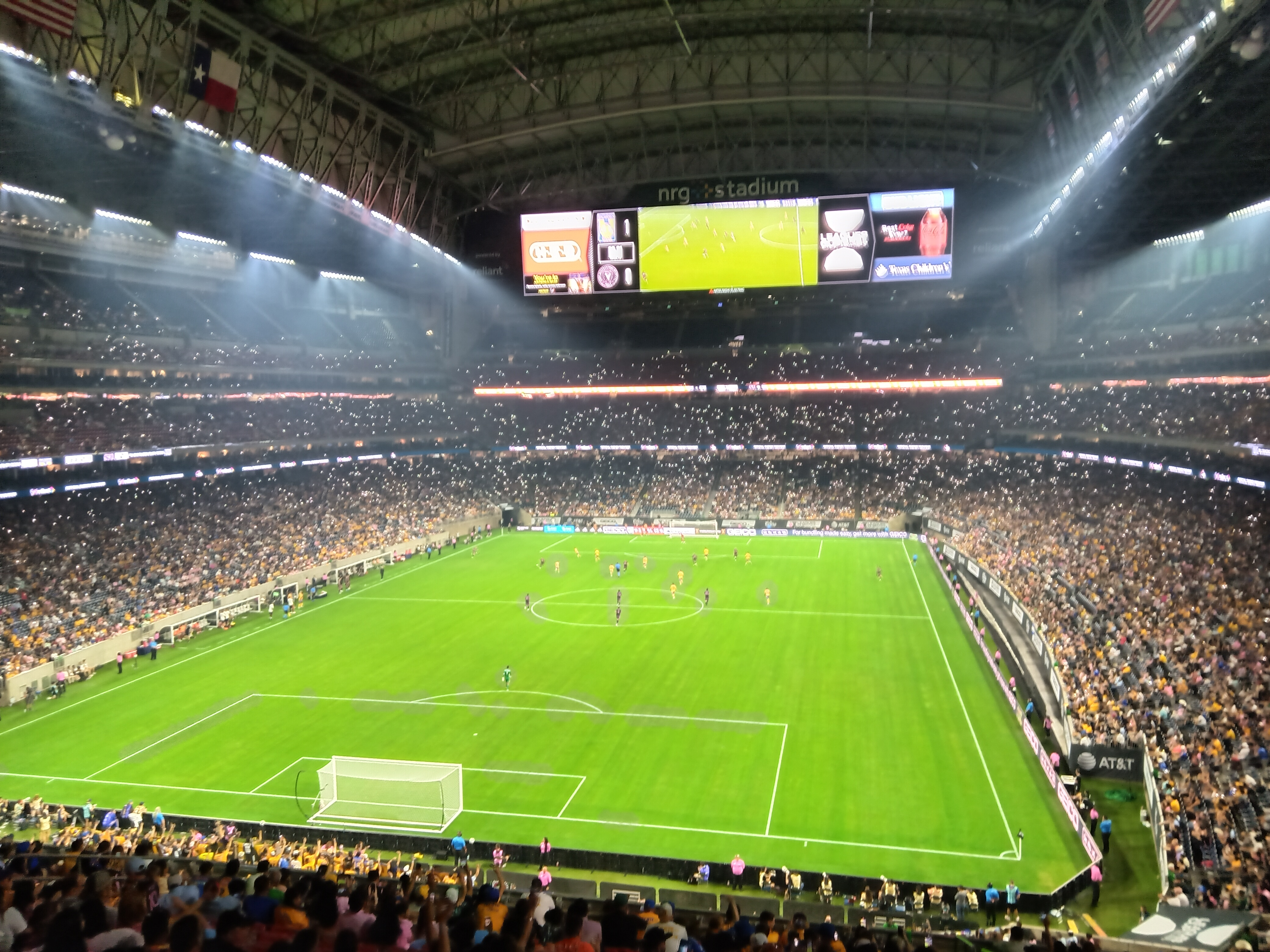
NRG Stadium, Leagues Cup 2024

Reliant Stadium also hosts international soccer matches. The games are generally held in the spring and summer before the NFL season starts. The stadium hosted CONCACAF Gold Cup matches from 2005 to 2011. The Gold Cup matches in 2007 included first round matches, and a quarterfinal doubleheader match. The venue's attendance record was set during a preparation match between the Mexico national team and the U.S. men's soccer team.

On February 6, 2008, United States v Mexico was held at Reliant Stadium to a capacity crowd of 70,103. The previous USA v Mexico match in Reliant Stadium drew a sellout crowd of 69,582 fans on May 8, 2003 and was the largest home crowd for the United States men's national team that decade, until they played Mexico for a capacity crowd of 79,156 fans at Giants Stadium in East Rutherford, New Jersey for the 2009 CONCACAF Gold Cup final.

Reliant Stadium hosted the 2010 MLS All-Star Game as 70,728 fans watched Manchester United defeat the MLS All-Stars 5–2.

On January 25, 2012, Venezuela played a friendly match with Mexico, with Mexico winning 3–1. On May 31, 2013, Mexico played another friendly, with Nigeria, which ended in a 2–2 draw.

In June 2016, NRG Stadium hosted two matches in the group stage and one semifinal in the Copa América Centenario. Costa Rica beat Colombia 3–2. Mexico and Venezuela drew 1–1. Argentina beat the United States 4–0; Lionel Messi scored a free kick, making him Argentina's all-time leading scorer.

Date	Winning Team	Result	Losing Team	Tournament	Spectators
May 8, 2003	United States	0–0	Mexico	Friendly	69,582
July 29, 2004	(England) Everton	5–2	(Mexico) Pachuca	Copa de Tejas	8,346
August 1, 2004	(Mexico) Club America	3–1	(England) Everton	Copa de Tejas	16,434
July 11, 2005	Guatemala	1–1	South Africa	2005 CONCACAF Gold Cup Group C	45,311
July 11, 2005	Mexico	1–0	Jamaica	2005 CONCACAF Gold Cup Group C	45,311
July 17, 2005	Colombia	2–1	Mexico	2005 CONCACAF Gold Cup quarterfinals	60,050
July 17, 2005	Panama	1–1 (5–3 pen.)	South Africa	2005 CONCACAF Gold Cup quarterfinals	60,050
November 16, 2005	Bulgaria	3–0	Mexico	Friendly	35,526
August 9, 2006	(Mexico) Club America	4–4	(Spain) FC Barcelona	Friendly	70,550
June 13, 2007	Honduras	5–0	Cuba	2007 CONCACAF Gold Cup Group C	68,417
June 13, 2007	Mexico	1–0	Panama	2007 CONCACAF Gold Cup Group C	68,417
June 17, 2007	Mexico	1–0 (a.e.t.)	Costa Rica	2007 CONCACAF Gold Cup quarterfinals	70,092
June 17, 2007	Guadeloupe	2–1	Honduras	2007 CONCACAF Gold Cup quarterfinals	70,092
February 6, 2008	United States	2–2	Mexico	Friendly	70,103
June 15, 2008	Mexico	2–0	Belize	2010 FIFA World Cup qualification	50,137
July 9, 2009	Guadeloupe	2–0	Nicaragua	2009 CONCACAF Gold Cup Group C	47,713
July 9, 2009	Mexico	1–1	Panama	2009 CONCACAF Gold Cup Group C	47,713
May 13, 2010	Mexico	1–0	Angola	Friendly	70,099
July 28, 2010	(England) Manchester United	5–2	(United States) (Canada) MLS All-Stars	2010 MLS All-Star Game	70,728
June 22, 2011	United States	1–0	Panama	2011 CONCACAF Gold Cup semifinals	70,627
June 22, 2011	Mexico	2–0 (a.e.t.)	Honduras	2011 CONCACAF Gold Cup semifinals	70,627
January 25, 2012	Mexico	3–1	Venezuela	Friendly	40,128
May 31, 2013	Mexico	2–2	Nigeria	Friendly	62,107
August 6, 2014	(Italy) Milan	3–0	(Mexico) Guadalajara	Club Friendly	14,871
July 1, 2015	Mexico	0–0	Honduras	Friendly	70,128
June 11, 2016	Costa Rica	3–2	Colombia	Copa América Centenario Group A	45,808
June 13, 2016	Mexico	1–1	Venezuela	Copa América Centenario Group C	67,319
June 21, 2016	Argentina	4–0	United States	Copa América Centenario semifinals	70,858
June 28, 2017	Mexico	1–0	Ghana	Friendly	37,617
July 20, 2017	(England) Manchester United	2–0	(England) Manchester City	2017 International Champions Cup	67,401
September 7, 2018	Uruguay	4–1	Mexico	Friendly	60,617
June 29, 2019	Haiti	3–2	Canada	2019 CONCACAF Gold Cup quarterfinals	70,788
June 29, 2019	Mexico	1–1 (5–4 pen.)	Costa Rica	2019 CONCACAF Gold Cup quarterfinals	70,788
July 20, 2019	(Germany) Bayern Munich	3–1	(Spain) Real Madrid	2019 International Champions Cup	60,143
July 29, 2021	Mexico	2–1	Canada	2021 CONCACAF Gold Cup semifinals	70,304
July 20, 2022	(England) Manchester City	2–1	(Mexico) América	Club Friendly	61,223
June 25, 2023	Haiti	2–1	Qatar	2023 CONCACAF Gold Cup Group B	66,255
June 25, 2023	Mexico	4–0	Honduras	2023 CONCACAF Gold Cup Group B	66,255
July 26, 2023	(Spain) Real Madrid	2–0	(England) Manchester United	Club Friendly	67,801
June 22, 2024	Mexico	1–0	Jamaica	2024 Copa América Group B	53,763
June 24, 2024	Colombia	2–1	Paraguay	2024 Copa América Group D	67,059
July 4, 2024	Argentina	1–1 (4–2 pen.)	Ecuador	2024 Copa América quarterfinals	69,456
August 3, 2024	(Mexico) UANL	2–1	(United States) Inter Miami CF	2024 Leagues Cup	46,080
October 13, 2024	(Mexico) América	2–0	(Mexico) Guadalajara	Club Friendly	54,117
July 6, 2025	Mexico	2–1	United States	2025 CONCACAF Gold Cup final	70,925

==== 2026 FIFA World Cup ====
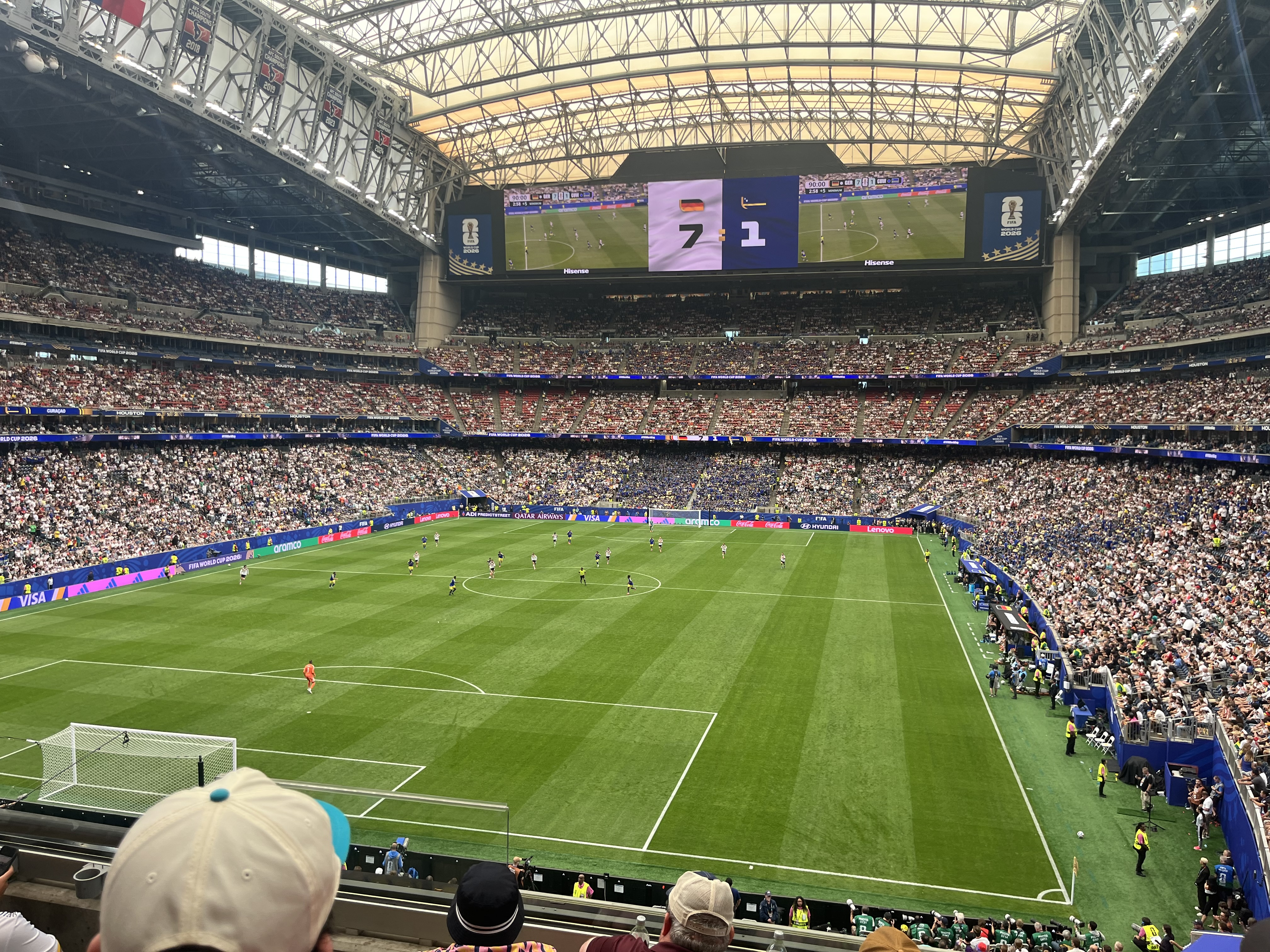
Inside NRG Stadium during the Germany vs. Curaçao match at the 2026 FIFA World Cup

Reliant Stadium hosted seven matches during the 2026 FIFA World Cup. It was one of eleven US venues which had been selected. It was also one of two venues in Texas which had been selected to host matches, the other being AT&T Stadium in Dallas. The stadium was temporarily renamed to "Houston Stadium" in accordance with FIFA's policy on corporate sponsored names for the World Cup. The stadium hosted five group stage matches, one Round of 32 match, and one Round of 16 match on Independence Day.

Date	Time (UTC−5)	Team #1	Res.	Team #2	Round	Attendance
June 14, 2026	12:00	Germany	7–1	Curaçao	Group E	68,021
June 17, 2026	12:00	Portugal	1–1	DR Congo	Group K	68,777
June 20, 2026	12:00	Netherlands	5–1	Sweden	Group F	68,777
June 23, 2026	12:00	Portugal	5–0	Uzbekistan	Group K	68,777
June 26, 2026	18:00	Cape Verde	0–0	Saudi Arabia	Group H	68,278
June 29, 2026	12:00	Brazil	2–1	Japan	Round of 32	68,777
July 4, 2026	12:00	Canada	0–3	Morocco	Round of 16	68,777

==== College basketball ====
The stadium has hosted the NCAA Division I men's basketball tournament several times, including the 2008, 2010 and 2015 South Regional semifinals and finals, and the Final Four in 2011, 2016, and 2023.

=== Motorsports ===
For the past eighteen years, Reliant Stadium has played host to Monster Jam. Also, it has hosted a round of the AMA Supercross Championship since 2003, replacing the Astrodome which had been host since 1974.

=== Concerts ===
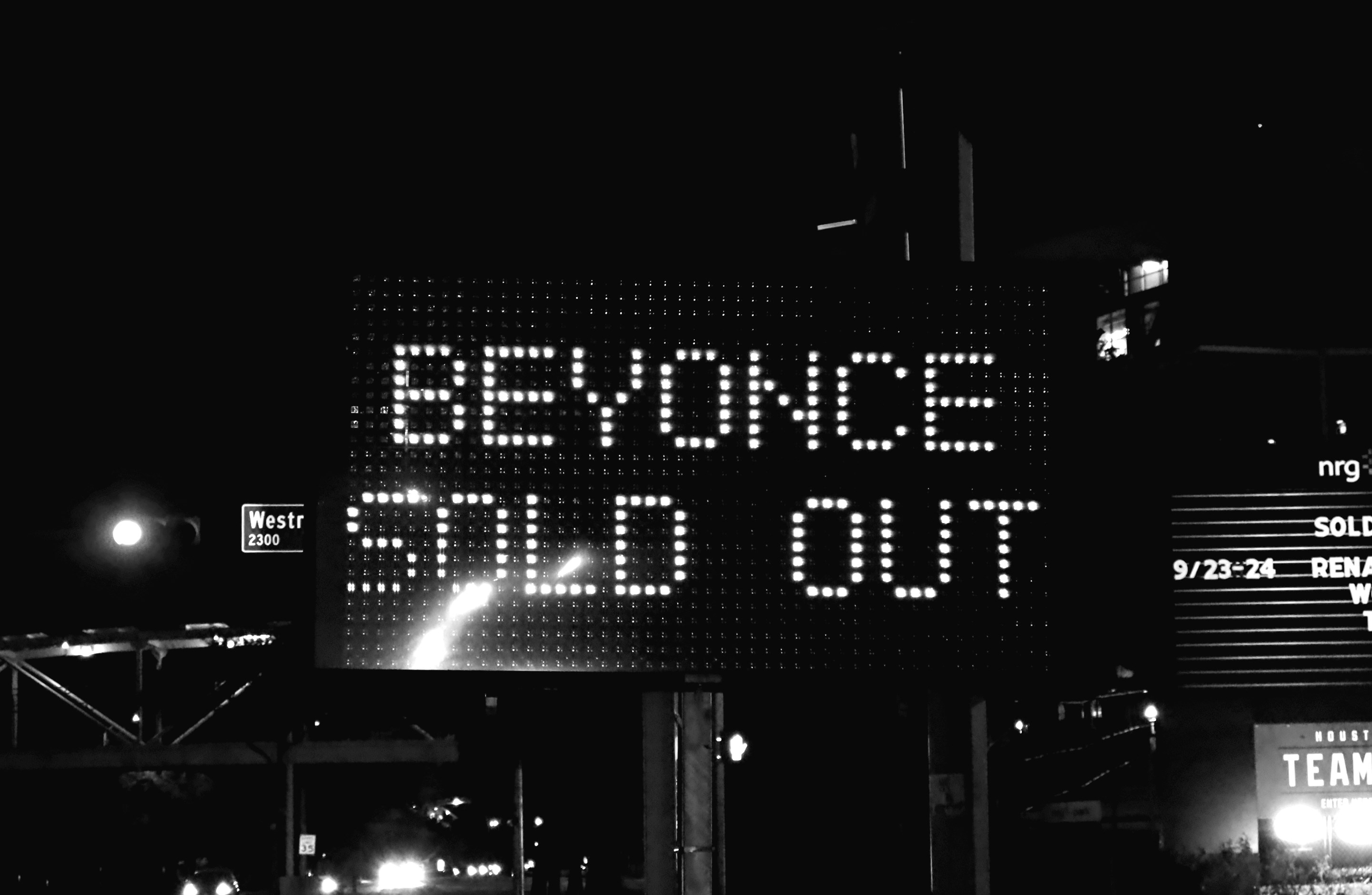
The stadium frequently hosts large-scale music concerts.

The stadium is a regular concert venue and has featured performers such as Linkin Park, The Rolling Stones, Metallica, Beyoncé, U2, Selena, Guns N' Roses, Morgan Wallen, One Direction, Chris Brown, Usher, Bruno Mars, Taylor Swift, Karol G, and Coldplay over the years. When Taylor Swift returned in 2023 for The Eras Tour, she became the first act in stadium history to sell out three shows on a single tour.

On June 14, 2025, Metallica set a new attendance record at the stadium with over 75,000 fans confirmed in attendance in support of their M72 World Tour.

=== Hockey ===
On September 23, 2011, the Dallas Stars and the Phoenix Coyotes were scheduled to play a preseason game. This proposed game was later canceled citing costs to put ice in the stadium.

=== Other events ===
Rice University uses executive offices in the stadium to teach a professional sports management class.

The stadium hosted WrestleMania 25 on April 5, 2009.

The Howdy Modi event was held on September 22, 2019, by Texas India Forum.

During the summer of 2019, the stadium hosted two international conventions of Jehovah's Witnesses, gathering thousands of delegates from around the world.

== See also ==
- Astrodome
- History of Houston
- List of American football stadiums by capacity
- List of current National Football League stadiums
- Lists of stadiums

== Notes ==
Events and tenants
Preceded by first stadium	Home of the Houston Texans; 2002 – present	Succeeded by current
Preceded by Qualcomm Stadium; Levi's Stadium	Host of the Super Bowl; XXXVIII 2004; LI 2017	Succeeded by ALLTEL Stadium; U.S. Bank Stadium
Preceded by Texas Stadium; Arrowhead Stadium	Home of the Big 12 Championship Game; 2002; 2005	Succeeded by Arrowhead Stadium; Arrowhead Stadium
Preceded by Citrus Bowl	Host of WrestleMania; 2009 (25)	Succeeded by University of Phoenix Stadium
Preceded by Lucas Oil Stadium; Lucas Oil Stadium; Mercedes-Benz Superdome	NCAA Men's Division I Basketball Tournament; Finals Venue; 2011; 2016; 2023	Succeeded by Mercedes-Benz Superdome; State Farm Stadium; State Farm Stadium
