= METRORail Red Line =

Light rail line in Houston, Texas

Red Line

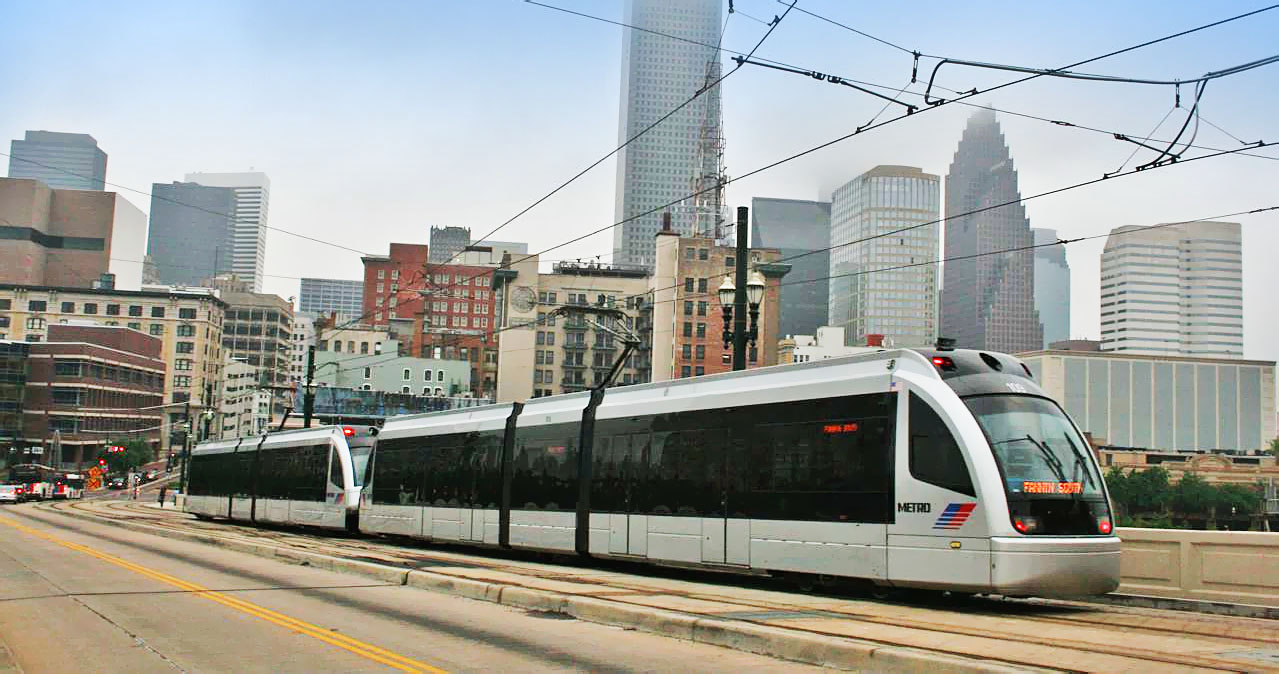

Overview
- Locale: Houston, Texas
- Termini: Northline Transit Center/HCC (north); Fannin South (south)
- Stations: 25

Service
- Type: Light rail
- System: METRORail
- Operator: METRO
- Daily ridership: 37,770 (September 2023)

History
- Opened: January 1, 2004; 22 years ago
- Last extension: December 21, 2013; 12 years ago

Technical
- Line length: 12.8 mi (20.6 km)
- Track gauge: 4 ft 8 1/2 in (1,435 mm)
- Electrification: overhead catenary
- Highest elevation: At-grade with two elevated sections
Route map
Detailed diagram
Key

The Red Line is one of three light rail routes on the METRORail network operated by METRO in Houston, Texas. It is the oldest line in the METRORail system, with the first 7.5-mile (12.1 km) section of the line between Fannin South and UH–Downtown opening on January 1, 2004.

Construction on a 5.3-mile (8.5 km) extension to the north began July 2009, and was expected to continue until 2014, though the opening date was later pushed back to 2015. On December 8, 2011, the FTA announced the award of a $450 million grant from the New Starts transit program to fund construction of the Red Line. Better than expected construction progress eventually led to the new line opening ahead of schedule on December 21, 2013.

== Route ==
The approximately 12.8-mile (20.6 km) Red Line runs through the heart of the historic North Side, a storied neighborhood rooted in rail that came into being with the expansion, in the 1880s, of the Hardy Rail Line. It largely parallels Interstate 45.

=== Description ===
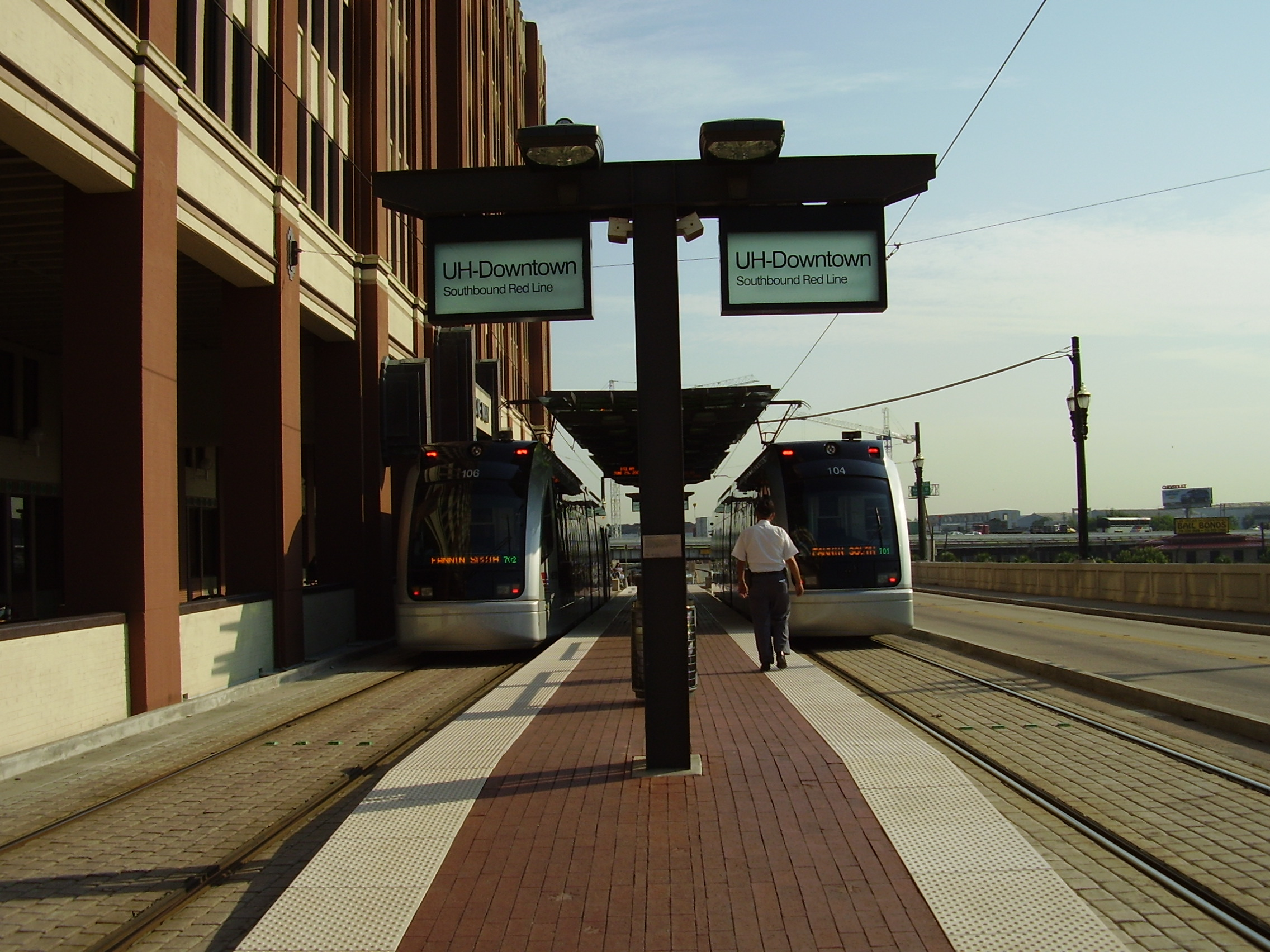
UH–Downtown, the northern terminus of the line for nearly 10 years

Starting at Fannin South, the Red Line travels parallel to Fannin Street, crossing under I-610, until it shifts onto Greenbriar Drive. It turns onto South Braeswood Boulevard briefly before returning to Fannin Street, which it follows through the Texas Medical Center. Through the Museum District, trains travel on one-way streets: southbound trains use Fannin Street, while northbound trains move onto San Jacinto Street. The tracks rejoin just south of I-69 before merging onto Main Street, which it follows through Midtown and Downtown. Along this stretch, the line intersects with the eastbound Green Line and Purple Line at Rusk Street and the westbound lines at Capitol Street. The tracks eventually move onto the west side of Main Street as they approach UH–Downtown station, the original terminus of the line, located adjacent to the University of Houston–Downtown campus.

Since 2013, the Red Line continues north, following Main Street through the Burnett Transit Center and on to Boundary Street, where it crosses east to Fulton Street, and proceeds north on Fulton through the Near Northside to its current terminus at the Northline Transit Center, located adjacent to the Northline campus of the Houston Community College.

== Infrastructure ==
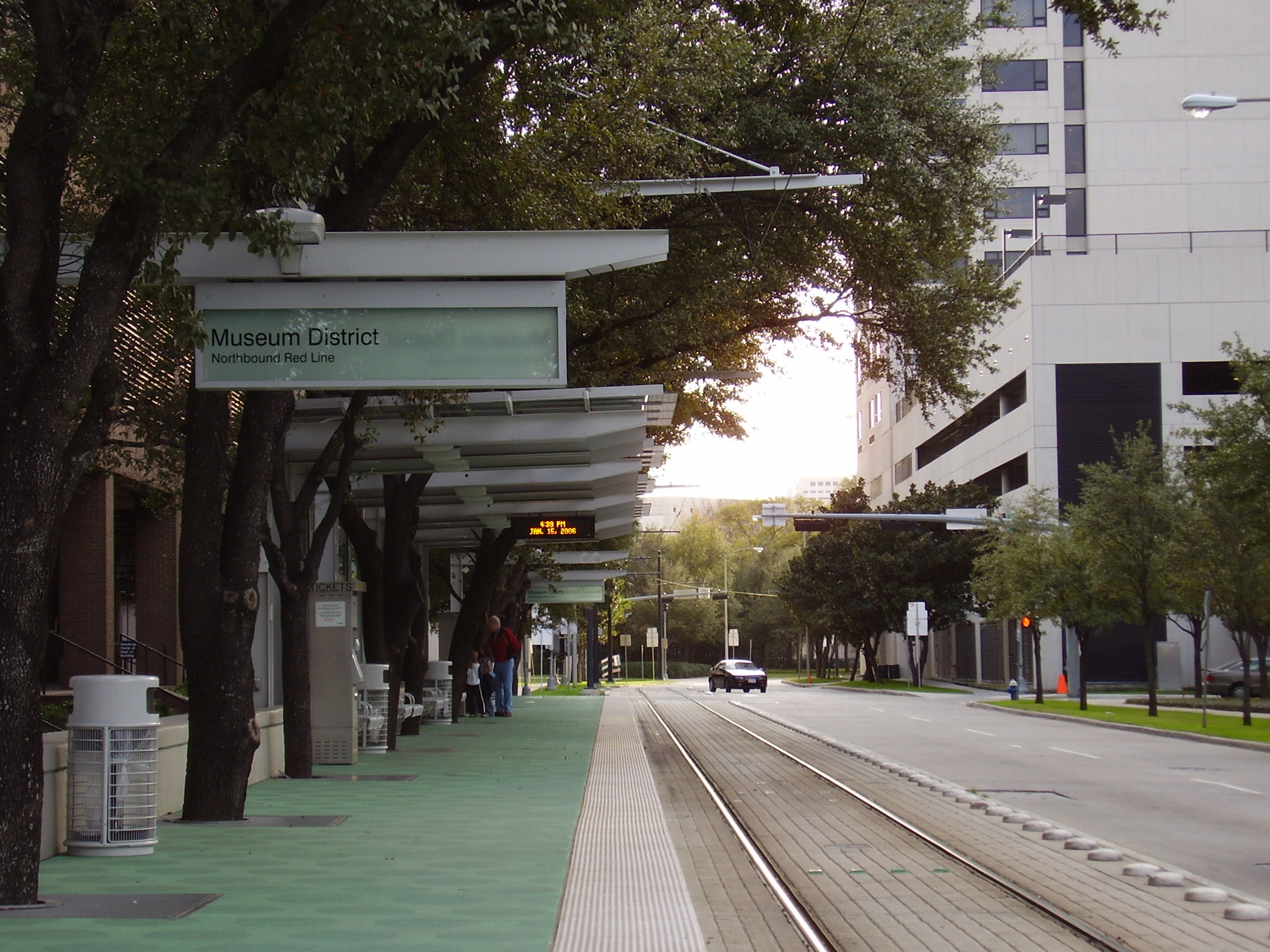
In Houston's Museum District, northbound and southbound trains take separate streets.

As with the other METRORail lines, the Red Line is predominantly at-grade and street running, with paved tracks laid down the median of Main Street in downtown, Fannin Street to the south, and Fulton Street to the north. These tracks are not physically separated from road traffic, though they are located in dedicated lanes and trains receive priority at intersections at cross-streets by means of preempted traffic signals. However, flashing grade crossing signals and gates are present where trains cross parallel traffic lanes as they move from one street to another, and along the section of the line south of Old Spanish Trail, where tracks are laid out on a right-of-way parallel to the road rather than in the median. Two sections along the Red Line extension north of UH–Downtown, though, are located on elevated structures: the Burnett Transit Center and the tracks leading to and from it, and a grade-separated crossing of a freight line along Fulton Street south of the Northline Transit Center/HCC.

The line is fully double-tracked, with stations mainly consisting of a single island platform serving trains in both directions outside the central section along Main Street. However, the Main Street section of the line have split platform designs where platforms are located on both sides of a cross-intersection between the two tracks, each of which serve trains in one direction only, as do the side platforms on parallel streets at Museum District station.

In September 2025, signal priority was removed from the line. In November 2025, this decision was reversed following a public outcry, and signal priority was restored to the Red Line.

=== Rolling stock ===
Services on the Red Line are operated mainly by Metro's two generations of Siemens S70 LRVs: the H1 series delivered in 2004 for the opening of the initial section, the H2 series delivered in 2012 for the Northline extension and the H4 in 2022 for future expansions. Since 2015, H3 series CAF Urbos LRVs, which are mostly used on the Green and Purple Lines, can also been found on the Red Line. Trains are generally formed by two units coupled together.

== Stations ==
The following is a list of stations for this line, listed in order from north to south.

Station	Opening year	Connections	
Station	Opening year	METRORail	METRO Bus
Northline Transit Center/HCC	2013		23, 36, 45, 56, 79, 96
Melbourne/North Lindale	2013		
Lindale Park	2013		
Cavalcade	2013		26
Moody Park	2013		
Fulton/North Central	2013		79
Quitman/Near Northside	2013		66
Burnett Transit Center/Casa De Amigos	2013		3, 51/52, 79
UH–Downtown	2004		
Preston	2004		20, 30, 48, 151, Park & Ride East, Gulf, Eastex and Southwest Corridor Routes; Multiple routes within two blocks east and west of line
Central Station (Main)	2015	METRORail Green Line METRORail Purple Line	Multiple routes within two blocks east and west of line
Main Street Square	2004		40, 41 (McKinney St and Lamar St); Multiple routes within two blocks east and west of line
Bell	2004		Multiple routes within two blocks east and west of line
Downtown Transit Center	2004		6, 11, 35, 44, 51/52, 54, 82, 85, 102, 108, 137, 161/162, Park & Ride lines (North, East, Gulf and Eastex Freeway corridors, Routes 212, 222)
McGowen	2004		54, 82
Ensemble/HCC	2004		9, 265
Wheeler Transit Center	2004		5, 25, 65, 152/153
Museum District	2004		5, 56, 65, 292, 298
Hermann Park/Rice University	2004		56, 292, 298
Memorial Hermann Hospital/Houston Zoo	2004		28, 56, 292, 298
Dryden/TMC	2004		56, 84
Texas Medical Center Transit Center	2004		2, 4, 10, 14, 27, 28, 41, 56, 60, 68, 84, 87, 402 (Quickline), Park & Ride lines (TMC Corridor Routes 270, 292, 297, 298)
Smith Lands	2004		84
Stadium Park/Astrodome	2004		60
Fannin South	2004		8, 11, 73, 87

NOTE: METRO bus routes adjacent to Red Line services between Preston and Bell stations:

- via Smith St (soutbound)/Louisiana St (northbound): 44, 85, 151, 161/162, Park and Ride Northwest, Katy and Southwest corridors
- via Milam St (southbound)/Travis St (northbound): 82, 102, 108, Park and Ride North, East, Eastex and Gulf corridors
- via Fannin St (southbound)/San Jacinto St (northbound): 6, 11, 51/52, 137

=== Proposed expansion ===
An extension of the Red Line further north along Interstate 45 or the Hardy Toll Road to George Bush Intercontinental Airport has been proposed since the 2000s.
