= METRORail =

Light rail system in Houston, Texas

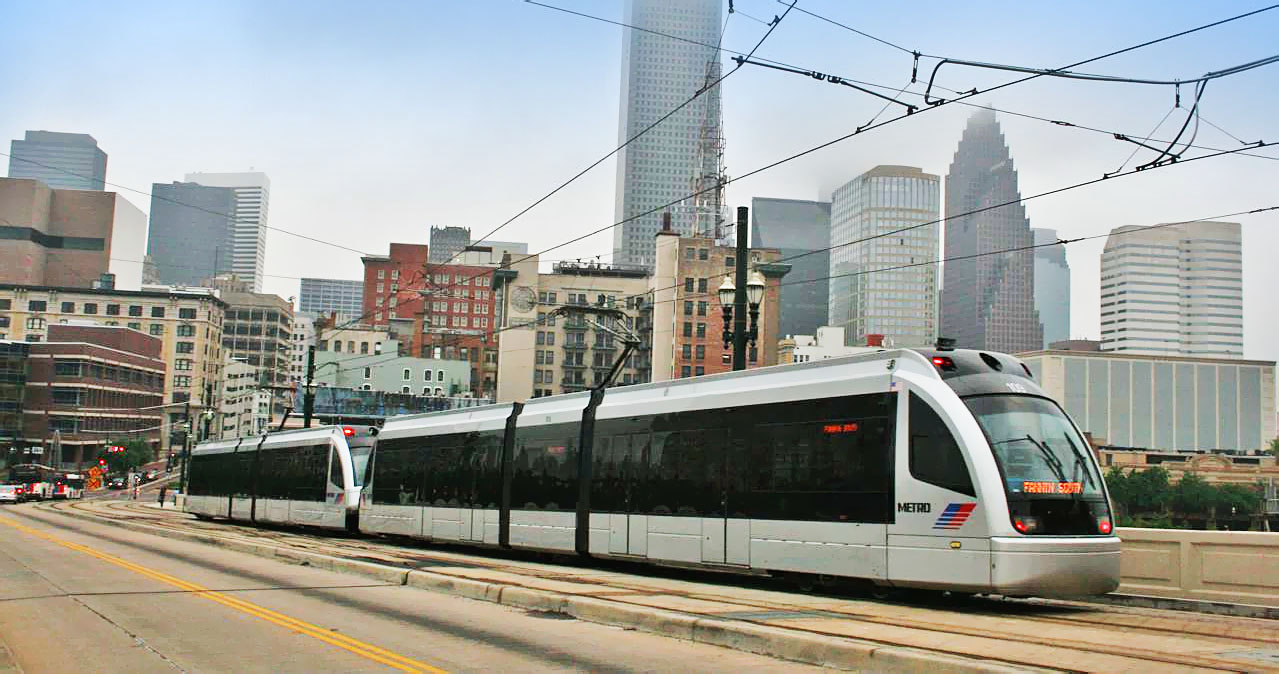
- Southbound two-car Siemens S70/H1 METRORail train on Red Line, departing downtown Houston (2007)

Overview
- Owner: Metropolitan Transit Authority of Harris County
- Locale: Houston, Texas
- Transit type: Light rail/Tram
- Number of lines: 3 (2 planned)
- Number of stations: 39
- Daily ridership: 37,700 (weekdays, Q2 2026)
- Annual ridership: 12,651,100 (2025)
- Chief executive: Thomas Jasien (Interim)
- Headquarters: Lee P. Brown METRO Administration Building; 1900 Main Street

Operation
- Began operation: January 1, 2004; 22 years ago
- Character: At grade, with street running sections
- Number of vehicles: 51 Siemens S70; 39 CAF Urbos LRV; 14 Siemens S700 (Note: The cars in this order were considered to be model S70 at the time the order was placed, but in 2019/20 were retroactively rebranded as model S700 by Siemens.)
- Train length: Two cars
- Headway: 6–20 minutes

Technical
- System length: 22.7 mi (36.5 km) (2012) (planned 24.4 mi (39.3 km))
- No. of tracks: 2
- Track gauge: 4 ft 8 1/2 in (1,435 mm) standard gauge
- Minimum radius of curvature: 350 ft (107 m)
- Electrification: Overhead line, 600–750 V DC
System map
Key

METRORail is the 22.7-mile (36.5 km) light rail system in Houston, Texas, United States. In 2025, the system had a ridership of 12,651,100, or about 37,700 per weekday as of the second quarter of 2026. METRORail ranks as the second most-traveled light rail system in the Southern United States and the 10th most-traveled light rail system in the United States, and has the highest ridership per mile for light rail systems in the Southern US. METRORail is operated by the Metropolitan Transit Authority of Harris County (METRO).

== History ==
=== Predecessors ===
The first streetcar service was a mule-drawn railcar operated by the Houston City Railroad Company along McKinney Street in 1868. Because the company chose a bad street alignment, the nascent line foundered after just weeks in service. It was succeeded by the Houston City Street Railway (HCSR), which was founded in 1870 and began revenue operation in 1874 with routes following busy merchant districts along Congress Avenue and Main Street, the latter of which ran to one of the first sites of the Texas State Fair; the area was subsequently developed and is now Midtown, Houston. A competing service, the Bayou City Street Railway, was started in 1883 with a single route along Texas Avenue, but it was purchased and folded into HCSR later that year. A new competitor, also named Bayou City Street Railway, was founded in 1889; the new Bayou City was purchased and consolidated into HCSR in 1890 by Oscar Carter, who also announced plans to electrify the system.

By 1892, electrification of the existing streetcar lines was complete and extensions began past the immediate downtown/central Houston area (within a 1 1/2 mi (2.4 km) radius of the Harris County Courthouse), including the Houston Heights suburb, which was developed by Carter and required streetcar service due to its distance from central Houston. HCSR was acquired by the Houston Electric Company in 1901, which was managed by Stone & Webster and continued to expand the service, including the start of interurban service to Galveston provided by the affiliated Galveston–Houston Electric Railway in 1911. However, the popularity of privately owned automobiles began to displace demand for streetcar service and the system stopped expanding after 1927. Several streetcar lines were converted to conventional bus lines in 1936, and the right-of-way for the Interurban was sold in 1940, later being reused for the Gulf Freeway. The last streetcar completed its run early in the morning of June 9, 1940, and the rails were later removed and scrapped during World War II.

A 'sample' monorail line was built in Houston in 1955; the Trailblazer operated over a 1,600 ft (490 m) line at Arrowhead Park with a peak speed of 10 mph (16 km/h), starting on February 18, 1956. The monorail ceased operation in September of that year and subsequently was moved to Fair Park in Dallas for the Texas State Fair, where it continued to run until 1964.

=== False starts ===
Rapid Transit Lines, the successor to HCSR and Houston Electric, proposed a rapid transit system as a long-range project under the 1971 "Transit Action Program" (TAP), developed by Alan M. Voorhees and Associates, largely laid out along the radial spokes centered in the Inner Loop, tracing the city's major freeways. TAP would be implemented in two stages. In Stage 1, 40 mi (64 km) of rapid transit routes would be built, including fixed rail lines serving the southwest, west, and northeast parts of Houston (with a downtown subway), and three bus-exclusive lanes along the North, Gulf, and South freeways. Stage 1 was planned to complete in the 1970s at an estimated cost of $800 million. Under Stage 2, scheduled for completion before 1990, the Stage 1 rail lines would be extended and two more would be added, bringing the total system to 80 mi (130 km). TAP would have been the technical basis for the proposed Houston Area Rapid Transit Authority (HARTA), but a referendum to form HARTA was "soundly defeated" in 1973. The city of Houston purchased Rapid Transit Lines in April 1974 for $5.3 million and renamed it the Houston Transit System ("HouTran").

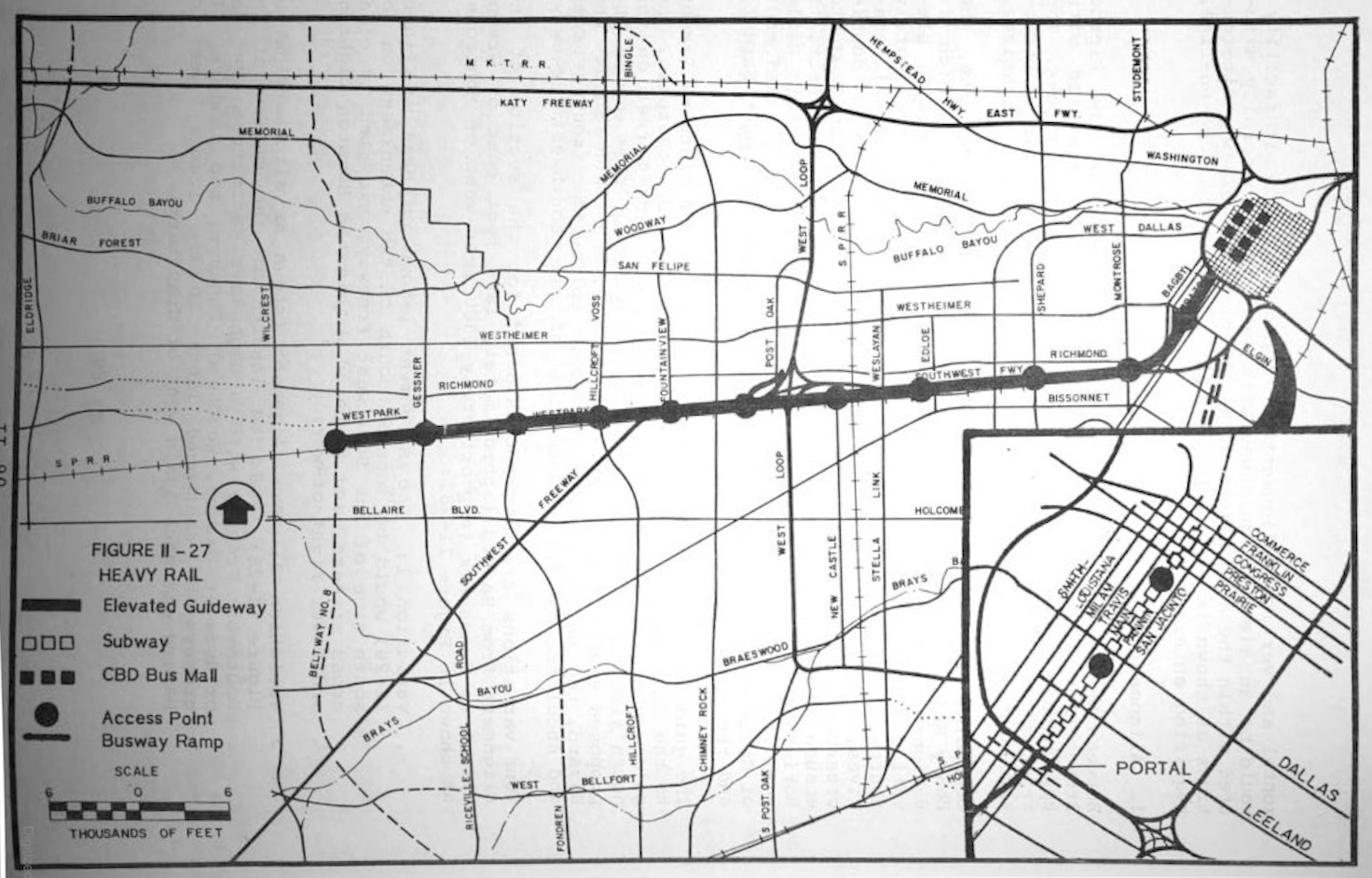
Proposed alignment of the Southwest/Westpark corridor, Heavy Rail alternative including subway under Fannin

Houston formed the Office of Public Transportation in January 1975 to plan the region's public transportation system, and began working on an update of TAP. After METRO was formed in 1978/79, an initial Phase I alternatives analysis identified multiple potential transit corridors, and under Phase II, proposed in 1980, the "Southwest/Westpark" corridor (along what is now the Westpark Tollway) was prioritized for further study. The proposed Southwest/Westpark corridor would have run 13.1 mi (21.1 km), generally parallel to the Southwest Freeway, with equal lengths west and east of the West Inner Loop. The planned route would run from downtown Houston along Main Street to approximately Elgin, and west from Elgin to West Belt along existing public and rail rights-of-way. Service options that could be operated along the corridor included a dedicated busway on an elevated structure (carrying 203,500 daily riders at an estimated capital construction cost of $878 million), an elevated light rail system (213,400 daily passengers; $1.297 billion), a light rail subway (226,800 daily; $1.572 billion), or a grade-separated heavy rail system with subway through the central business district (223,700 daily, $1.366 billion). At the time, it was estimated that 9.5 million person-trips were made per day in Harris County; of those, 98.7% were taken using private vehicles.

METRO updated its 1980 Southwest/Westpark corridor proposal and extended the eastern terminus north by 5.1 mi (8.2 km), combining it with the proposed North corridor as the "Houston Rail Rapid Transit Project"; the extended line now ran north past I-10 and the North Inner Loop to Crosstimbers. The design called for 11.5 mi (18.5 km) of elevated tracks, 1.9 mi (3.1 km) of subway, and 4.8 mi (7.7 km) at-grade. The system would have 17 passenger stations (eight aerial, six at-grade, and three subway), and included a new railyard/maintenance facility at Cavalcade. The 1983 proposal was rejected by Houston voters via referendum. Light voter turnout was blamed for the defeat of the $2.35 billion proposal, which included the purchase of approximately 400 new buses and construction of a 18.5 mi (29.8 km) heavy rail system. The capital cost of the rail system alone was estimated at $1.436 billion, including 130 new rail vehicles.

In the wake of the 1983 defeat, METRO began work on a regional transit plan, integrating inputs from city, county, and state governments and developing three options for implementation: A (bus routes only), B (light rail loop and radial bus routes), or C (light rail with supplemental bus routes); after approximately 250 meetings were held in 1984 and 1985, citizens overwhelmingly supported Option C, with planned light rail service to operate along Main Street within the inner loop (I-610). Longtime Houston Mayor Kathryn Whitmire appointed Bob Lanier to chair METRO in 1988; Lanier shepherded a voter referendum that year which passed, approving the Phase 2 Regional Mobility Plan which included 20-mile (32 km) of fixed guideway transit. Under the 1988 referendum, METRO would devote 1/4 of its sales tax revenue on roads, 1/2 on improving bus service, and the remaining 1/4 on developing the fixed guideway plans, but Lanier showed reluctance to follow through on developing plans for a fixed guideway, questioning the projected ridership numbers, and Whitmire fired him in late December 1989. Incensed, Lanier released a memorandum attacking the mayor's rail transit plans, and Whitmire responded by holding a press conference on Lanier's front lawn during his annual Christmas party.

Houston was the largest city in the United States without a rail system after the 1990 opening of the now A Line in Los Angeles. After issuing an RFP in July 1990, METRO received five proposals for the design and development of the fixed guideway system. In March 1991, METRO approved a plan to develop a monorail system similar to the one operating at Walt Disney World in Orlando at an estimated cost of $1.27 billion, operating along the extended Southwest/Westpark corridor between the Houston Galleria and downtown Houston. The proposed monorail system would operate with an initial 14 mi (23 km) segment servicing western residential regions west of downtown to Beltway 8 (Sam Houston Tollway), with construction planned to start in 1993 and revenue service to begin by 1998. Future planned expansions included one leg that would connect downtown with the Texas Medical Center and Astrodome to the south, and another leg connecting downtown to Texas Southern University and the University of Houston. In 1991, U.S. Rep. Tom DeLay removed $65 million in federal funding for the rail line and after Lanier was elected mayor of Houston in 1992, defeating Whitmire, the plan was stopped. Lanier's election was seen as a second referendum on the monorail plan; the funding was diverted to road projects and police patrols instead.

=== Main Street Line ===
After these setbacks, Houston drew up a rail plan without federal subsidies and published it in 1997 as the Houston METRO 2020 Regional Transit Plan. The Houston city council approved the light rail project in November 2000 and set a January 25, 2001 date for a groundbreaking ceremony, but councilmember Rob Todd filed a lawsuit opposing construction, claiming the METRO organization was a "private business" and subject to Houston City Charter provisions requiring a public vote on business use of its streets; the ceremony was cancelled following a temporary restraining order, issued by Judge Tony Lindsay on January 18. Todd was joined as co-plaintiff by Allan Vogel, one of 1,100 residents who signed a petition seeking a public vote on the light rail plan. Judge Lindsay later recused herself from the case due to her personal ties to Todd and her husband's public opposition to METRO. She was succeeded by District Judge John P. Devine, who issued an injunction on February 2, halting work on the light rail project and holding up contract awards. A second lawsuit was filed by four property owners.

The injunction issued by Judge Devine in Todd's lawsuit was reversed on appeal on March 9, 2001. Ground was broken on the original 7.5-mile long (12.1 km), 16-station portion of the Main Street (now Red) Line on March 13, 2001. The Texas Supreme Court upheld the appellate court ruling on June 28. That November, voters approved Proposition 1, which allowed the light rail project to continue, but required public referendums for future extensions, and rejected Proposition 3, which would have initiated a public referendum on continuing the initial project.

Initial Red Line segment (as opened Jan 1, 2004)

The initial segment runs between UH–Downtown (northern terminus) and Fannin South (southern terminus). The opening of METRORail, which took place on January 1, 2004, came 64 years after the previous streetcar system had been shut down. At the time, two extensions to the north and east were already in planning, and a concept was advanced for a third extension west.

The cost of the initial segment was $324 million. Tom DeLay strongly opposed construction of the METRORail line and twice blocked federal funding for the system in the United States House of Representatives. Thus the Metrorail was built without any federal funding until November 2011 when a $900 million grant was approved for expansions, under an executive order issued by President Barack Obama.

In spite of the opposition of some groups to the Metrorail, surveys conducted by Stephen Klineberg and Rice University have shown consistent increases in support of rail transport and decreases in support for bigger and better roads/highways in the Houston metropolitan area in recent years. Klineberg considers these changes a "paradigm shift" or "sea change" on attitudes towards mass transit.

=== Phase II ===
METRORail Phase II was included as part of the METRO Solutions Transit System Plan (aka Metro Solutions Plan or 2025 Regional Transit Plan) that was placed before voters on the November 4, 2003 ballot. Phase II included six proposed light rail segments to complement and extend the Main Street line, then under construction.

2003 METRORail Phase II expansion plan
Name	Length	Stations	Termini		Status
North Hardy	5.4 mi (8.7 km)	4	UH-Downtown	Northline	Opened Dec 21, 2013 as Main Street Line extension
Southeast	9.9 mi (15.9 km)	13	Downtown	Palm Center	Truncated line opened May 23, 2015 as Southeast Line
Harrisburg	6.0 mi (9.7 km)	4	Dowling	Gulfgate Center	Truncated line opened May 23, 2015 as East End Line
Westpark	6.6 mi (10.6 km)	4	Hillcroft T.C.	Wheeler T.C.	Reconfigured as one segment of a planned METRORapid BRT line.
Uptown/West Loop	4.4 mi (7.1 km)	7	Bellaire	Northwest T.C.	Reconfigured as BRT; truncated line opened Aug 23, 2020 as Silver Line
Inner Katy	7.4 mi (11.9 km)	6	Northwest T.C.	Downtown	Proposed right-of-way removed during widening of Katy Freeway. Reconfigured as BRT.

Voters approved the $1.23 billion Phase II expansion of the as-yet unopened system, including four new lines. Critics of the system opposed METRO for spending public funds for "educational advertisements" about the proposed system, which critics claimed promote the referendum. Critics further claimed that the main political action committee (PAC) supporting the bond had a conflict of interest because it received over US$100,000 in contributions from contractors and equipment suppliers for METRORail who stood to gain financially from its expansion. By 2004, Rep. DeLay was hailing the leadership team at METRO for both its "vision for a mobile Houston region, and the kind of open minds and flexible management style it will take to realize that vision", adding that "[METRO] are holding a forum to look at all forms of technology and how those technologies fit into the mobility in Houston"; at least one observer noted that DeLay was advocating for "innovative rail solutions", not light rail.

In 2004, an alternatives analysis selected a shorter route for the Southeast Corridor.

The North and Southeast corridors received their records of decision from the Federal Transit Administration (FTA) in July 2008. Construction began in July 2009 on the 5.3-mile-long (8.5 km) North/Red Line Extension (North Corridor), including nine stations from UH–Downtown to the Northline Transit Center/HCC. The 6.6-mile (10.6 km) Purple Line (Southeast Corridor), with ten stations, and the 3.3-mile (5.3 km) Green Line, with nine stations, also began construction in July 2009. According to the project schedules, the Red Line Extension would enter revenue service by 2013 and the Green Line by 2014. However, METRO announced on September 9, 2010, that the opening dates for the Red Line Extension, Purple and Green lines had been pushed back to 2014 and by September 2014, the start date had slipped back to April 4, 2015.

In November 2009, METRO applied for a $900 million grant from the Federal Transit Administration to fund future construction. Allegations were made that METRO lied about the income from their sales tax revenue to allow them to gain $900 million in federal funds for all five planned rail expansions. However, city officials found no such attempt by METRO to mislead them, but the Federal Transit Administration (FTA) continued to withhold its approval for the money until further figures can be examined. On December 8, 2011, the FTA finally announced the award. The award of $900 million was broken into two $450 million grants from the New Starts transit program, to fund construction of the Red Line Extension and Purple lines. METRO offered the public a chance to name stations on its expansion lines.

Part of the funding allocated by the FTA under its New Starts program for the North, Southeast, and University Corridor projects included up to US$205 million to expand the LRV fleet to 104 vehicles and replace the existing 19 LRVs on the Red Line. METRO selected a public-private partnership model for the North and Southeast corridors, where the contracted firm would be responsible for vehicle procurement and operation and maintenance of those lines, and entered a contract with Washington Group International (WGI); METRO/WGI issued a request for proposals for 103 firm new vehicles and an option of up to 75 additional vehicles on August 31, 2007. Although the FTA reminded METRO about federal procurement rules on multiple occasions, METRO told prospective bidders that Buy America rules did not apply (presumably because the RFP was issued by the private contractor) and awarded a contract to CAF on March 4, 2009. Later that month, METRO requested a Buy America waiver for two pilot vehicles which would be assembled by CAF in Spain; the FTA denied the waiver request, stating that CAF had signed a certificate of compliance with Buy America requirements. METRO proceeded to use local funds to pursue the pilot vehicle procurement, and the FTA opened an investigation in April 2010. Ultimately, the CAF contract was canceled and 1/3 of the US$42 million contract was refunded to METRO.

Consolidated map of proposed expansions, including Phase II lines as updated in 2010 and METRONext planned extensions. Proposed METRONext extension of Red Line to Sugar Land truncated.

The North/Red Line extension opened on December 21, 2013 (ahead of its projected early 2014 opening), increasing the line to its current total of 12.8 miles (20.6 km) and 24 stations. Central Station was added to the Red Line to provide transfers to/from the Purple and Green lines.

After numerous delays, all but two stations on the eastern end of the Green Line opened on May 23, 2015, while Cesar Chavez/67th Street and Magnolia Park entered service on January 11, 2017, after the construction of an overpass. Both the Purple and Green lines, together costing $1.3 billion, share a track segment in downtown, then run east and diverge.

=== Cancellations and BRT conversions ===
Plans for the Inner Katy rail line (east of Loop 610) under the METRO Solutions Plan (2003) conflicted with existing plans to widen the Katy Freeway west of Loop 610 to Texas State Highway 6. A Major Investment Study for the Katy Freeway Expansion was started in 1994 and approved in October 1997; the draft and final environmental impact statements were completed by August 30, 2002. In preparation, TxDOT purchased a portion of the right-of-way for the old Katy Railroad from Union Pacific (UP) in 1992 for $78 million, and the UP was scheduled to begin track removal in the last half of 1997. In all, 28 mi (45 km) of track were removed from Katy/Fort Bend Road in Brookshire to Canal Street in Houston. The adopted alternative for the expanded freeway called for an at-grade roadway with a total right-of-way width of 475 ft (145 m); in each direction, there would be two managed lanes closest to the center, flanked by four main lanes, up to two auxiliary lanes, and three frontage road lanes. That year, a Memorandum of Understanding was signed between TxDOT, METRO, and Harris County, which identified requirements for the managed lanes, including prioritization of METRO buses and an option to convert those lanes to light rail transit in the future. The Gulf Coast Institute criticized the contradictions between TxDOT, which selected the managed lanes over rail due to insufficient projected transit demand, and METRO's Solutions Plan, which noted that a Katy line could "offer the potential for sizeable transit volume". By 2005, the Inner Katy corridor had been dropped from METRO Solutions.

METRO began negotiations with Southern Pacific (SP) to acquire the tracks and right-of-way alongside the Eastex Freeway that were formerly owned by the San Antonio and Aransas Pass Railroad and a conceptual agreement was reached in December 1992; METRO would re-use the line for commuter rail service. However, after METRO decided to purchase a subset of the original agreement at a fraction of the agreed-upon price, SP sued and the a settlement was reached in 1997, with METRO purchasing 58 mi (93 km) for $72 million. Shortly after the purchase was completed, business interests pressured METRO into selling a portion of the right-of-way to the Harris County Toll Road Authority, which was eventually developed into the Westpark Tollway. By 2006, a proposed revised corridor along Richmond was drawing opposition from local business owners and Texas Rep. Martha Wong, who advocated for a route along Westpark instead. In August 2010, a budget shortfall of $49 million was announced by METRO, which halted progress on the University Line. The line had received a final Federal Record of Decision letter from the FTA in July but METRO had not announced a construction schedule or funding plan. Since then, BRT service has been proposed along the corridor instead.

METRO published the "Uptown-West Loop Planning Study" in 2004, which was a proposed light rail line along Post Oak Boulevard and West Inner Loop, connecting new stations at Bellaire (at the junction with U.S. Route 59) and Northwest Transit Center (at the junction with I-10). In the alternatives analysis, bus rapid transit (BRT) service was considered and dismissed as an alternative to light rail, due to the reduced capacity of BRT vehicles and the strong community preference for rail. Due to lack of funds, it was announced in early 2013 that the Uptown Line (now Silver Line) will be constructed initially as a bus rapid transit (BRT) line. The design will feature the ability to easily convert the line to light rail in the future. This will allow the line to be functional as early as 2017.

Following METRO's 2010 annual audit, the agency decided to cancel the Burnett Plaza project. $41 million was spent on the initial design of the proposed intermodal terminal. This was part of a $168 million asset liquidation. The price of the land $21 million is valued separately. $61 million of the liquidation was listed as "unrealized assets", including charges for redundant design contractors and changes.

=== Future plans ===
METRO put the METRONext Moving Forward Plan before Houston area voters in November 2019; voters approved the $3.5 billion bond by a margin of nearly two-to-one. Bonds issued will be used to extend existing light rail service. The Red Line will be expanded North to the North Shepherd park & ride, and both the Green and Purple lines will be expanded east and south to William P Hobby Airport, and west to the Houston Municipal Courthouse.

A long extension or possible commuter rail line from Fannin South to Sugar Land and beyond has been studied since 2004. The route would parallel U.S. 90A in the existing right-of-way used by the Glidden subdivision owned by UP. In 2011, the Southwest Rail Corridor was proposed to connect Fannin South and Missouri City. This was not constructed, but the METRONext plan includes a similar route extended to Sugar Land which it describes as a "future METRORail potential partnership."

METRO soon cancelled major expansion plans in 2024.

== Operations ==
The light rail lines operate all 7 days of the week. They begin operations at 3:30 a.m. weekdays and 4:30 a.m. weekends and end service at 12:30 a.m. Monday through Thursday nights, 2:45 a.m. Friday and Saturday nights and, 12:30 a.m. Sunday nights. Scheduled train frequency varies from 6 minutes during the day to 20 minutes off-peak.

The light rail lines can handle three-minute headways during peak hours and have a design capacity of 8,000 people/hour in each direction while using two-car trains with such a headway. The scheduled time for an end-to-end trip through the entire 12.8-mile (20.6 km) Red Line is on average 55 minutes.

Tracks on all three lines are usually in dedicated right-of-way in the center of the street; however, the southbound tracks between the Wheeler and Museum-District stations run along the left side. The downtown Houston tracks along Capitol and Rusk streets run along the south side of the streets. Furthermore, these light rail trains run in mixed traffic, sharing a lane with buses and other vehicles — often being their turn lane.

METRORail operations are controlled from Houston TranStar, a traffic and emergency management center for the city and surrounding region. Trains have priority signalling at intersections except for six stations near the medical center and downtown. At prioritized intersections, traffic lights for road traffic in all directions turn red when a train approaches.

=== Route and infrastructure ===
Line	Distance	Route	Status
Red Line	12.6 mi (20.3 km)	Fannin South to Northline Transit Center/HCC	Opened January 1, 2004
Purple Line	6.7 mi (10.8 km)	Theater District to Palm Center Transit Center	Opened May 23, 2015
Green Line	3.2 mi (5.1 km)	Theater District to Magnolia Park Transit Center	Opened May 23, 2015

==== Red (Main Street) Line ====
The Red Line is a 12.6-mile (20.3 km) double-tracked, 4 ft 8 1/2 in (1,435 mm) standard gauge line with 24 stations approximately 1/2 mile (0.8 km) apart, running from Fannin South to the Northline Transit Center/HCC Station. Almost the entire route is at grade and on city streets. The original 2004 portion from Fannin South to UH-Downtown is entirely at ground-level and at-grade with street traffic. However, on the North/Red Line Extension (from UH-Downtown to the Northline Transit Center/HCC two small portions are elevated: the Burnett Transit Center station and a small section of track between Melbourne/North Lindale and the Northline Transit Center/HCC on Fulton Street. Power is supplied at 600–750 volts DC from overhead wires, with nine substations (for the original 2004 portion). The line follows Main Street for eight stations from UH–Downtown to Wheeler station, then follows Fannin Street for the remainder of the original route until Fannin South. Northbound trains run on San Jacinto Street (rather than Fannin) for a small section of the route between the Wheeler and Museum District stations. The North/Red Extension runs along North Main Street until just after Quitman Near Northside, then turns onto Boundary Street until just before Fulton/North Central, and then runs along Fulton Street until the Northline Transit Center/HCC.

Significant businesses and institutions along the Red Line route include the University of Houston–Downtown, Houston's restaurant district near Preston Station, the Downtown Transit Center, Houston's museum district, Rice University, Memorial Hermann Hospital, the Texas Medical Center and NRG Stadium.

A park & ride parking lot is available at one station: Fannin South. It has approximately 1,200 parking spaces. Parking fees included a daily rate of $3 and a monthly hangtag contract of $40. The Burnett Transit Center was designed to have a park and ride facility next to the Casa de Amigos Health Center; it was scheduled to open in late 2014, but the project was canceled in 2011 and scaled back to a multimodal stop.

For the original 2004 portion of the Red Line, the architectural firm Pierce Goodwin Alexander & Linville, of Houston, was in charge of the final architectural/engineering design and design support, with a $2.3 million contract. However, all stations south of Burnett Transit Center were designed by the Houston office of St. Louis-based architectural firm Hellmuth, Obata & Kassabaum. All stations are of similar design—250 feet (76 m) long and partially covered by glass roofs. Station length was constrained by the distance between crosswalks in downtown city blocks; station platforms are low-floor and 350 millimetres (14 in) high. The line includes a 760 m-long (2,490 ft) bridge along Main Street which separates the double-track main line and a third pocket track from UP's line and three streets. A yard and a maintenance facility for the Red Line is connected by loop track to the south of the Fannin South station.

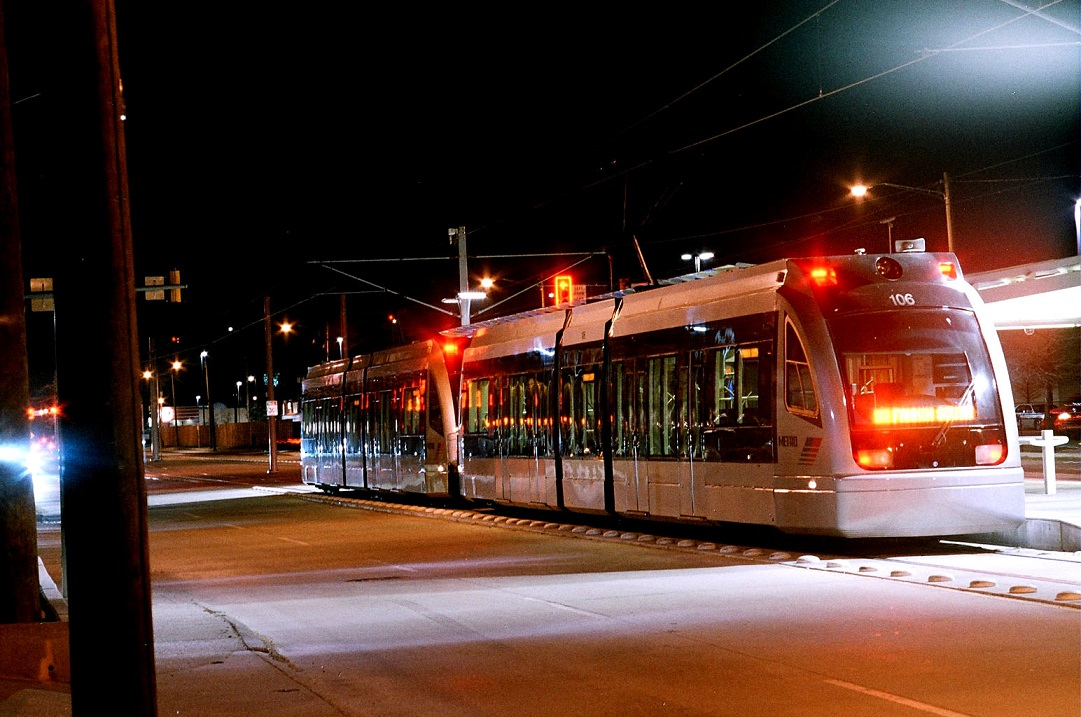
Houston MetroRail Cars at the Northline Transit Center/HCC on Fulton near Crosstimbers (January 2015)

The right-of-way and the stations for the original 2004 line were built by three contractors for approximately $115 million: Texas Sterling Construction Co. of Houston, Bencon Management of Houston and Beers Construction Co. of Atlanta. The line construction was divided into five sections, with a resident engineer for each section, to speed up construction.

==== Purple (Southeast) and Green (East End) Lines ====
The 6.7-mile (10.8 km), 10-station Purple Line, and seven stations of the 3.2-mile (5.1 km), 9-station Green Line opened on May 23, 2015. The final two stations of the Green Line opened on January 11, 2017. A storage yard/inspection facility is located off of Harrisburg and Clifton.

=== Fares ===
The standard fare for the rail lines is $1.25 for both cash and RideMETRO Fare Card riders; $3 for a Day Pass. A discount fare is available for qualified RideMETRO Discount Fare Card riders [those who are seniors 65–69, disabled, Medicare cardholders or full-time students (elementary, high school and university)]; the discounted fare is $0.60 for cash or $1.50 for a Day Pass. All discount riders must show ID (except for elementary and high school students). Free rides to METRO buses are available with the RideMETRO Fare Card only, for 3 hours in any direction. Paper transfers from buses were accepted from July 2015 to March 2016 on a trial basis boarded for free: before noon good until 15:00, after it to end of service day. RideMETRO Fare Card holders can earn one free local trip per 10 paid trips. Tickets and cards are purchased from machines at the stations. No charge applies to Texans/Dash/Dynamo home game days with game ticket, nor to seniors over 70 or to children under 5 who ride with an adult (limit 3).

Fare collection, like most light rail systems in the United States, is based on a proof-of-payment system: METRO's fare inspectors randomly check tickets and cards aboard trains. Failure to pay the fare is a Class C Misdemeanor and is subject to a fine of up to $500. Consumption of alcoholic beverages is prohibited on the train platform and subject to the same fine as a Class C Misdemeanor.

=== Ridership ===
In the first year of METRORail, daily ridership, though increasing from 12,102 in January to 32,941 in October, tapered off slightly in the last two months of the year, and "fell short of the 35,000 goal transit officials had set" in early 2004, according to the Houston Chronicle. The line reached 75 million boardings in December 2011, four years ahead of schedule, but throughout that year, ridership numbers remained flat or showed small decreases. By 2012, average weekday ridership was 36,250.

The North/Red Line Extension exceeded ridership projections by 62% in the first month of operation, averaging 4,200 weekday boardings in January 2014; this was 1,600 more boardings than projected for the extension through September 30, 2014 (the end of the METRORail's fiscal year).

Notable records in ridership have occurred on the following dates:

- February 1, 2004: 64,005 passengers rode the METRORail to Super Bowl XXXVIII
- February 23, 2004: 54,193 passenger boardings were recorded, the highest weekday at the time
- February 27, 2007: 56,388 passengers were recorded the day of the Houston Livestock Show and Rodeo
- March 15, 2012: 70,611 passengers were recorded; many of whom attended the Houston Livestock Show and Rodeo and a performance by The Band Perry after the rodeo at the Reliant Park sports complex.
- March 19, 2014: 76,925 passengers were recorded due in part to the Houston Livestock Show and Rodeo.
- February 4, 2017: 109,500 passenger boardings were recorded during Super Bowl LI
- November 4, 2017: 125,000 passenger boardings were recorded the day of the Houston Astros World Series victory parade and rally held in Downtown.

== Rolling stock ==
METRO currently operates three generations of light rail vehicles. All of them are double-articulated, 70% low-floor vehicles with four low-platform doors per side to provide level boarding.

Series	Builder	Model	In service	Fleet numbers	Years of service	Lines used	Image
H1	Siemens	S70	18	101–118	2004–present		
H2	Siemens	S70	19	201–219	2012–present		
H3	CAF USA	Urbos LRV	39	301–339	2015–present		
H4	Siemens	S700	14	(401–414)	2022–present		

=== H1 series ===
The original fleet of 18 vehicles was built by Siemens Transportation Systems in Sacramento, California; the $117.9 million contract for Siemens included the light rail infrastructure (traction power, signals, and communication systems) and an initial order of 15 light rail vehicles. Three additional vehicles were ordered in 2002. 101 to 115 were delivered in 2003 and 116 to 118 in 2004, for the opening of the first stage of the Red Line. Designated by the manufacturer as S70 and based roughly on earlier vehicles built for Portland's MAX Light Rail system, each vehicle is 96 feet (29 m) long and has a top speed of 66 mph (106 km/h). They have a capacity of 72 seated and approximately 169 standing passengers, or a total capacity of around 241 per car. This approximately 250-person capacity has been reached on certain Super Bowl weekends.

The H1 series cars are distinguishable by their streamlined cab ends and rectangular headlamps, with the electronic destination sign (which have been modified to indicate the line with a colored square) mounted directly in front of the cab rather than above it. They are normally used only on the Red Line and can be operated as single cars or in trains of two cars coupled together, though two-car trains have become the norm due to increasing ridership and the arrival of the H2 series.

=== H2 series ===
For expansion of the METRORail system, METRO turned to CAF USA, with a total order of 105 cars placed in May 2010. A subsequent investigation by the Federal Transit Administration determined the procurement violated the Buy America Act, and the US$42 million order was cancelled in February 2011. CAF gave a partial refund of US$14 million, which METRO applied to the purchase of what would become the H2 series cars.

In the spring of 2011, METRO purchased a further 19 Siemens S70 vehicles (the same model as its original 18), citing the need to accommodate ridership that was 4 years ahead of expectations and to get cars more quickly. These cars were options under a contract for Utah Transit Authority's TRAX system, which METRO purchased for $83 million after UTA decided not to exercise its options. As with the previous H1 generation, these new cars were built in Florin, California, but they differ slightly from the cars Utah received in detail, including having more air-conditioning units. They were delivered in October 2012 and entered service that December.

The H2 series cars are shorter than the H1 series, at 85.3 feet (26.0 m) in length, accommodate slightly fewer passengers (60 seated, 225 maximum), and have a lower maximum speed of 55 mph (89 km/h). Externally, the H2 series are distinguishable by their flatter cab ends and circular headlamps, with the electronic destination sign (which use colored dots to indicate the line) conventionally mounted above the cab. Like the H1 series, they are normally used only on the Red Line and can be operated as single cars or in two-car trains. The H1 and H2 series are electrically compatible and can operate together in the same train.

=== H3 series ===
In September 2011, METRO approved the purchase of 39 vehicles from CAF upon receipt of a new proposal compliant with Federal Transit Administration (FTA) and "Buy America" guidelines. The first six of these cars were delivered in January 2015 and entered service shortly afterwards.

The H3 series cars, built in Elmira, New York and based on the CAF Urbos platform used in cities across Europe and Asia, are similar in size and capacity to the H1 series with a length of 97 ft (29.6 m) and accommodating a maximum of 242 passengers (64 seated), but are distinguishable by their boxier design and framed window panes. They are in operation on all three METRORail lines and can couple to form two-car trains; however, the H3 series is electrically incompatible with the older types and cannot operate with them in the same train.

=== H4 series ===
In February 2019, METRO ordered 14 additional Siemens S700 vehicles (H4), with interior modifications designed to improve passenger flow compared to the agency's prior H1 and H2 series S70s. These vehicles result from the reassignment of options from Minneapolis–Saint Paul Metro Transit in May 2018. Metro Transit previously had signed a contract with Siemens to deliver 27 low floor S70 LRVs with options for up to 50 additional vehicles in 2016. These new vehicles would be used for the Metro Green Line Extension and Metro Blue Line Extension projects; subsequently, Metro Transit determined they would only need 27 vehicles for Southwest and 28 vehicles for Bottineau, leaving 22 options unexercised, and METRO requested the transfer of 14 of those options in 2018. Siemens re-designated the S70, as originally ordered with modifications in the center section per Metro Transit's needs for passenger flow, to the S700 in 2020. They entered into service on 15 December 2022.

== Incidents and crashes ==
For a full year before the Metrorail system's opening, a program to prepare drivers to share Houston streets with the Metrorail trains was conducted, consisting of driver safety classes, community forums and public service announcements. By August, the system averaged six crashes per month, 20 times worse than the national average for light rail systems. The high rate of incidents gave rise to local derogatory nicknames among detractors such as the "Wham Bam tram" and "Danger Train." METRO has consistently blamed driver error as the cause of the high collision rate and the transit agency's police department regularly tickets motorists who cross paths with the train. An independent panel of transportation experts at Texas A&M University issued a report in 2004 finding no fundamental flaws with the Metrorail system, although this report did recommend minor adjustments to signal timing and signage.

The 100th accident, as defined by METRO, occurred on August 10, 2005. In the judgement of METRO police, only two of these were the fault of the train operator. Most crashes resulted from drivers turning into the trains or running red lights. Following the Texas A&M report, METRO implemented four-way red lights at some crossings and other safety measures which led to a 75% reduction in incidents per train mile even as service ramped up. Critics have also noted the fact that the system is at-grade, while supporters contend that lack of federal funding due to political opposition made construction of a grade separated rail line unfeasible. Sociology and urban studies professor Stephen Klineberg argues that the high rate of crashes in Houston is attributable to the high rate of automobile driving and low rate of walking in Houston.

== See also ==
- List of METRORail stations
- Light rail in the United States
- List of United States light rail systems by ridership
- Light rail in North America
- List of tram and light rail transit systems
