= Hermann Park Railroad =

Narrow-gauge railroad in Hermann Park, Houston, Texas

Coordinates: 29.71682°N 95.3892°W

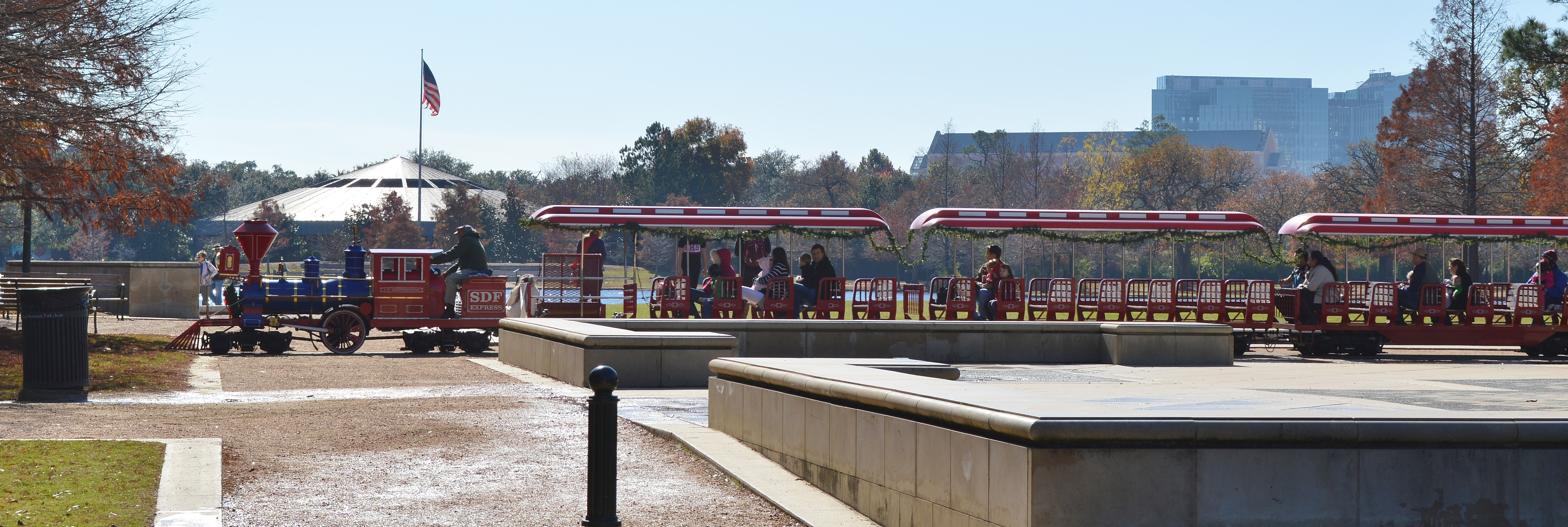

Overview
- Operator: Hermann Park Conservancy
- Stations operated: 4
- Locale: Hermann Park; Houston, Texas
- Dates of operation: 1957–present (Renovated 2008)

Technical
- Track gauge: 2 feet (610 mm)
- Length: 1.8 miles (2.9 km)

The Hermann Park Railroad is a 2-foot (610 mm) narrow-gauge railroad located within Hermann Park in Houston, Texas. The 1.8-mile (2.9 km) route travels throughout the park with stops at major attractions.

A round trip takes about 18 minutes. The track passes through a tunnel containing "Destination Mound Town", a pair of murals by Houston-based artist Trenton Doyle Hancock.

== History ==
The Hermann Park Railroad was first opened in 1957. The train was owned by the park and privately operated. In June 2007, the Hermann Park Conservancy assumed operation of the train.

On January 1, 2008, the train was temporarily closed for a $4 million renovation, which replaced and extended the track to its current length and gauge. In March, the train was reopened with one temporary stop near the Miller Outdoor Theatre. In April 2009, the Conservancy completed a renovation of the original station and opened three additional stops throughout the park. The railroad switched from gasoline-powered trains to battery-electric trains in Summer 2024.

== Stations ==
Following the 2008-09 renovation, the railroad has four stations. Riders may board at any station but are required to disembark at Kinder.

Station	Points of interest
Kinder	Hermann Park Conservancy Gift Shop; Houston Zoo; McGovern Lake and Pedal Boat Lagoon; Parking Lots E, F, G, and H
MD Anderson	Houston Museum of Natural Science; McGovern Centennial Gardens; Miller Outdoor Theatre
Mullenweg	METRORail: Hermann Park/Rice University; Japanese Garden; Rice University
Bob Weekly	METRORail: Memorial Hermann Hospital/Houston Zoo; Texas Medical Center; Parking Lot S
