= Cancer, There Is Hope =

Sculpture by Victor Salmones

Cancer, There is Hope
- Artist: Victor Salmones
- Year: 1990
- Type: Sculpture
- Medium: Bronze
- Subject: Cancer
- Condition: Partially destroyed
- Location: Hermann Park Conservancy, Houston, Texas, United States; 29.72339°N 95.390457°W

Cancer, There Is Hope is a bronze sculpture by Victor Salmones.

== The Richard and Annette Bloch Cancer Survivors Plaza at Hermann Park ==
Twenty-four Cancer Survivors Parks were built across the US and Canada. They are all different but designed with the same elements:

- A walk with bronze plaques containing inspirational and instructional information
- The Cancer, There Is Hope sculpture of eight people passing through a maze that represents cancer treatment
- A walk with bronze plaques containing information about cancer and basic actions to overcome it

The park program was founded by Richard Bloch (co-founder of H&R Block) and his wife Annette Block, after Richard survived lung cancer. He was treated at MD Anderson Cancer Center. The parks were part of a larger program supporting cancer research and patient education. The first park was in Bloch's home town, Kansas City, and the second was in Houston where he was treated.

=== Plaza details ===
The plaza is in Hermann Park's northern-most tip, between the Mecom Fountain and the Mecom-Rockwell Colonnade and Fountain. It has a stone gazebo with an ornate wrought iron dome, which encloses a small pool and fountain that represents the "burning point of life." This gazebo is surrounded by the plaza area, which includes the bronze sculpture, Cancer, There is Hope.

=== Sculpture details ===
Cancer, There is Hope was created by Mexican sculptor Victor Salmones (1937–1989). Salmones studied at Instituto Nacional de Bellas Artes y Literatura and apprenticed under Otto Hofmann. He would go on to be awarded prizes at national art expositions and held one-person shows globally. He sculpted, mostly in bronze with lost-wax casting, until his death from cancer in 1989. The Houston sculpture was cast shortly thereafter in 1990. The sculpture was dedicated in Hermann Park on May 16, 1993.

The sculpture originally had eight people of various ages passing through the maze of cancer treatment. Thieves stole some of the figures and vandals destroyed other figures beyond repair, and so the remaining sculpture has fewer figures than it did originally.

=== Other works by Salmones in the Houston area ===
Salmones also created Leapfrog in 1976, which is a bronze statue near the reflection pond in the Houston Zoo in Hermann Park.

== See also ==
- 1990 in art
- List of public art in Houston
