= Memorial Hermann Hospital/Houston Zoo station =

Light rail station in Houston, Texas

Memorial Hermann Hospital/Houston Zoo
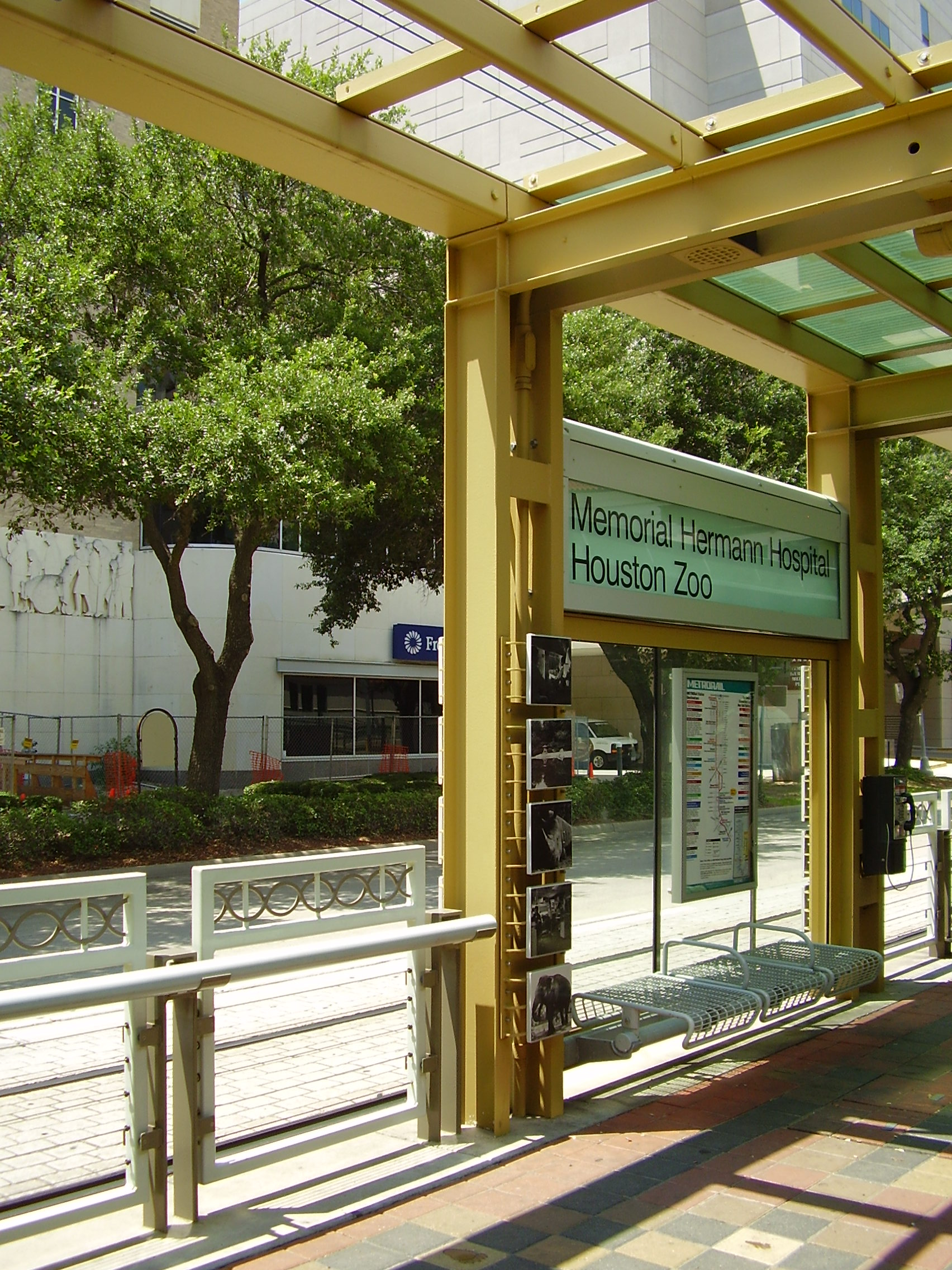

General information
- Location: Northbound: 6413 Fannin Street; Southbound: 6407 Fannin Street; Houston, Texas
- Coordinates: 29°42′51.13″N 95°23′50.56″W
- Owner: Metropolitan Transit Authority of Harris County
- Line: Red Line
- Platforms: 2 island platforms
- Tracks: 2
- Connections: METRO: 28, 56; METRO Park & Ride: 292, 298; Hermann Park Railroad

Construction
- Accessible: Yes

History
- Opened: January 1, 2004; 22 years ago

Passengers
- July 2025: 2,208 ▲0.2%

Services
Preceding station	METRORail	Following station
Dryden/TMC toward Fannin South	Red Line	Hermann Park/Rice University toward Northline Transit Center/HCC
Location

Memorial Hermann Hospital/Houston Zoo Station is a METRORail light rail station in the Texas Medical Center (TMC) neighborhood of Houston, Texas, United States. The northernmost station in TMC, it is located in the median of Fannin Street along the western side of the Memorial Hermann Texas Medical Center hospital. The station serves the Red Line.

In addition to Memorial Hermann, the station serves Ben Taub Hospital, McGovern Medical School, the Baylor College of Medicine, the Prairie View A&M College of Medicine. The Houston Zoo is northwest of the station in Hermann Park.

The station was opened on January 1, 2004.
