= Libbie J. Masterson =

American photographer and installation artist (b. 1969)

Libbie J. Masterson (born 1969) is an American photographer and installation artist.

In 2013, she installed a public artwork of 80 illuminated floating lily sculptures on Houston's Hermann Park lake. Masterson's public artworks also include pieces installed at the George Bush Intercontinental Airport and the Hobby Airport, Houston.

Her work is included in the collection of the Museum of Fine Arts, Houston.
