= Shadyside, Houston =

Subdivision in Houston, Texas, United States of America

Coordinates: 29.723°N 95.394°W

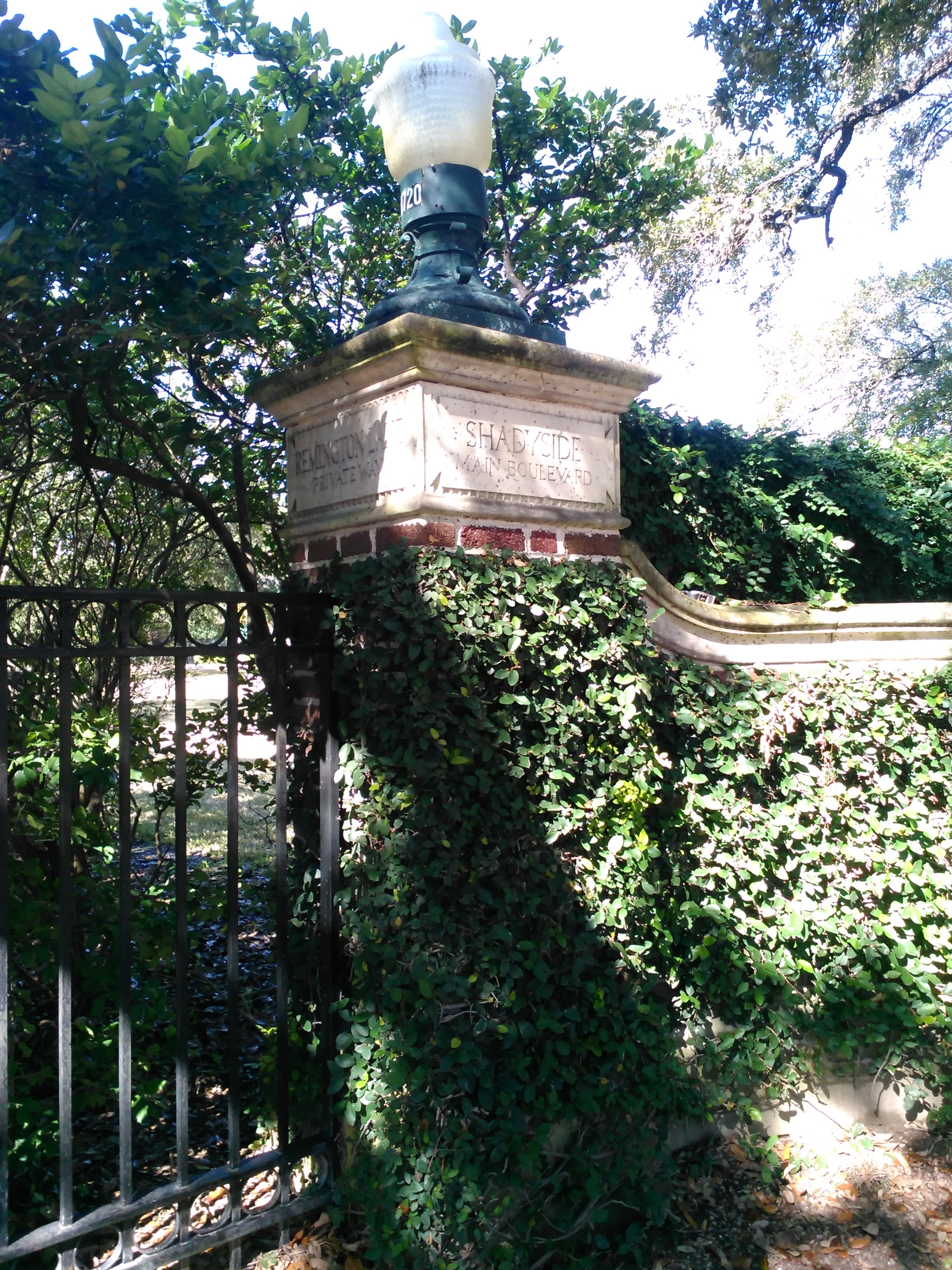
Shadyside subdivision marker at Main at Remington

Shadyside is a private, walled subdivision of 16 houses in Houston, Texas. In 2012 Terrence McCoy of the Houston Press said that Shadyside has a "sense of exclusivity, or as Heritage Texas Properties puts it, 'mystique,'" which caused many prominent figures from Houston to settle in Shadyside and continue doing so for a period of almost 100 years.

== History ==
Joseph S. Cullinan, an oil baron who founded Texaco, bought the land that would become Shadyside in 1916. Cullinan had purchased 37 acres (15 ha) from the estate of George H. Hermann for an undisclosed amount of money and hired a civil engineer to design the community. The estate wanted to ensure that one person would control the land. Cullinan said that Hermann himself did not want the new subdivision to adversely affect Rice Institute and Hermann Park. Cullinan said that his intention was to create a subdivision so that his business acquaintances and friends could live near him. In 1920, Cullinan put the subdivision, with 16 lots, on the market. It sold out within six weeks. The subdivision included a trust agreement stating that there would be no businesses, and that there would be no overhead electric lines or poles placed on any properties. It was scheduled to expire on June 30, 1969. Cullinan donated a piece of land next to Shadyside to the Houston Art League so the league could build a museum; this ensured that Shadyside would remain desirable. Mike Sheridan of the Houston Chronicle said "a story" said that William "Will" Hogg had an interest in buying a house in Shadyside but chose not to do so, and that "some observers say" that Cullinan had intended to sell land to Hogg but the two entered into a dispute over the title, so Hogg decided not to buy land there. Hogg and some associates instead developed River Oaks.

Terrence McCoy of the Houston Press said that Shadyside is "a neighborhood steeped in history." In 1925, Howard Hughes and Ella Rice's wedding occurred in Shadyside. Around June 30, 1969, some Shadyside members began litigation regarding the trust agreement. The First Court of Civil Appeals ruled that Shadyside "shall retain its status in perpetuity" and the Texas Supreme Court reaffirmed the decision. In 1983 the property owners' association bought the two streets within the community and erected gates, making it a private community. McCoy said "as the city grew around the neighborhood, privacy and safety assumed greater importance." John A. Daugherty Jr., the president of John Daugherty Realtors, said in 1986 that "for some years, there were no homes available in Shadyside because the original families kept them amongst themselves. Shadyside is now completing its first and second generation of dwellers and beginning to experience the influx of the third. Only just recently have a few properties become available." In 1994 the Greater Houston Preservation Alliance held a walking tour of the community.

== Cityscape ==
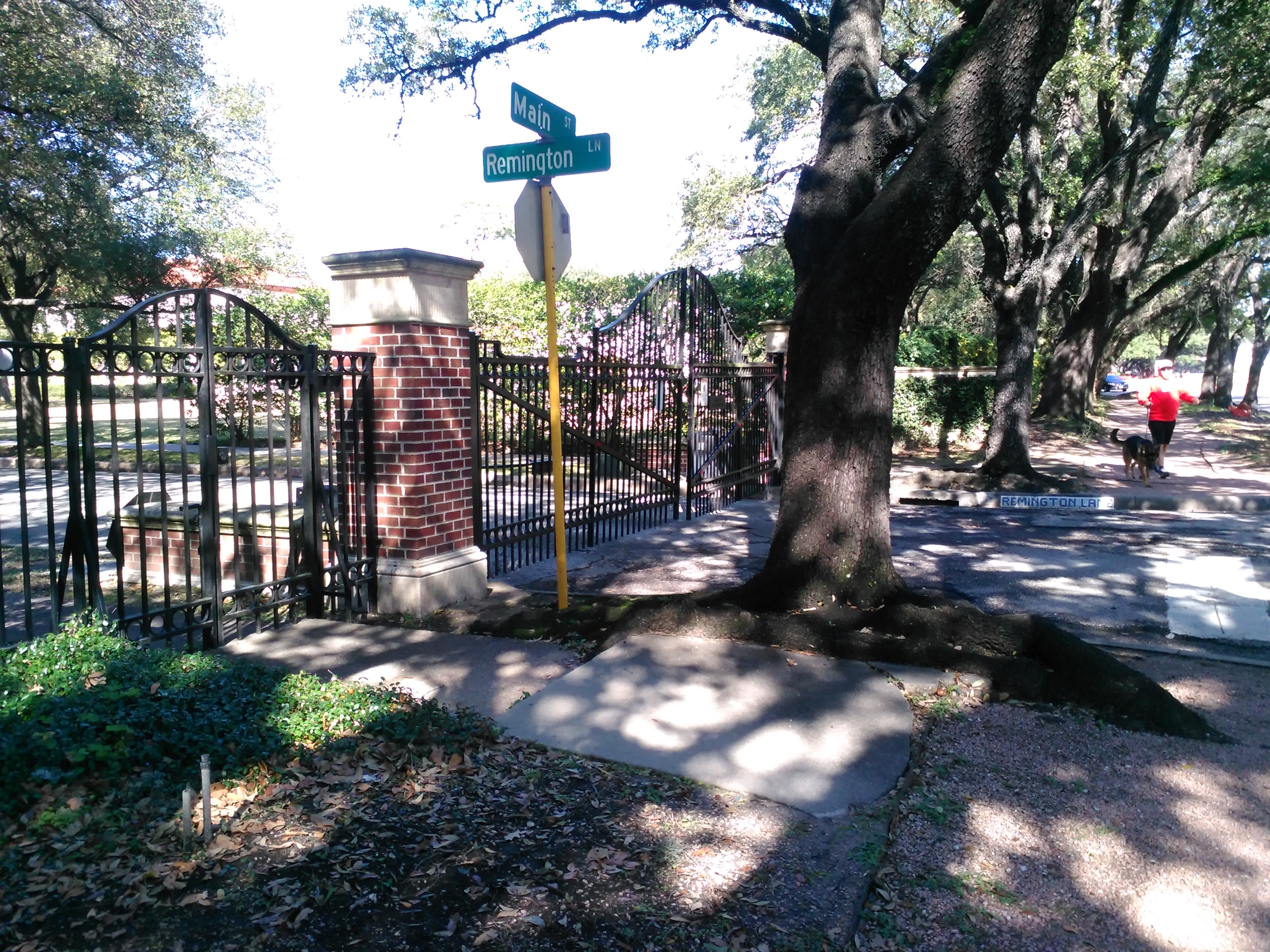
The gate at Main Street at Remington Lane is one of the entry points

The community is a private-walled subdivision on a 38-acre (15 ha) plot of land. Shadyside, located along the eastern boundary of Rice University and in proximity to the Houston Museum District, has two streets within the community, Longfellow Lane and Remington Lane. Longfellow, named after Henry Wadsworth Longfellow, Joseph S. Cullinan's favorite poet, extends from Main Street to Remington. Remington, named after Frederic Remington, Cullinan's favorite painter, follows a curve path, from Main Street to Sunset Boulevard.

Shadyside consists of 16 houses, many of which were built in the early 20th century. Terrence McCoy of the Houston Press said "The homes still reflect the tenor of the time, with grand entranceways and wings intended for fleets of servants." Mike Sheridan of the Houston Chronicle said that "most of the homes are imposing but not ostentatious." Famous architects such as John Staub or Harrie T. Lindeberg have designed Shadyside houses. Lindeberg and Staub had designed the houses of the Farrish, Neuhaus, and Womack families and the D. D. Peden house. Another Houston architect of note, Alfred C. Finn, designed a home for Earl K. Wharton in 1920.

== Government and infrastructure ==
The Harris Health System (formerly Harris County Hospital District) designated the Martin Luther King Health Center in southeast Houston for the ZIP code 77005. The designated public hospital is Ben Taub General Hospital in the Texas Medical Center.

== Education ==
Residents are within the Houston Independent School District. Shadyside is served by Poe Elementary School, Lanier Middle School, and Lamar High School.

== Notable residents ==
- Robert Lee Blaffer (Humble Oil president)
- John Bradshaw (author)
- Joseph S. Cullinan (founder of Texaco)
- William Stamps Farish II (Humble Oil president)
- Lykes family (shipping businesspeople)
- Hugo V. Neuhaus (Investment house figure)
- Anthony G. "Tony" Petrello (CEO of Nabors Industries)
- Harry Carothers Weiss (Humble Oil president)
- Mark White (Governor of Texas)
- Kenneth E. Womack (cotton businessman)
