= Wortham Theater Center =

Performing arts center located in downtown Houston, Texas, United States

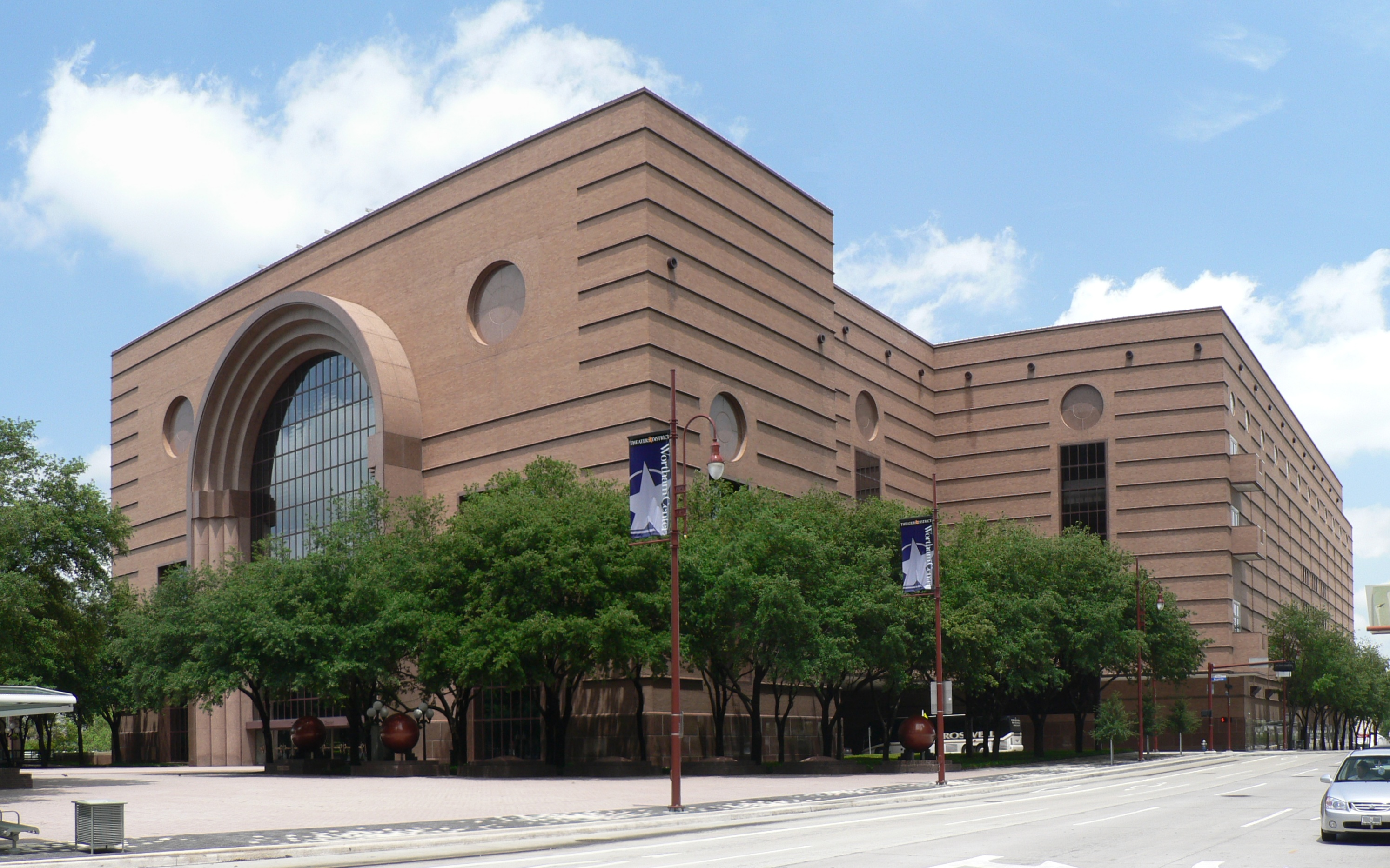

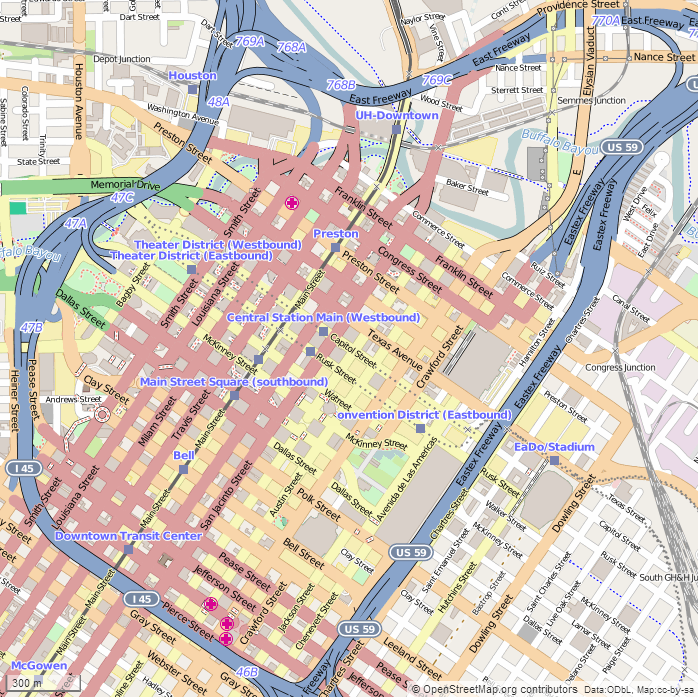
- Location within Downtown Houston
- Address: 501 Texas Avenue; Houston, Texas; United States
- Coordinates: 29°45′48″N 95°21′56″W
- Owner: City of Houston
- Operator: Houston First Corporation
- Capacity: Brown: 2,405; Cullen: 1,100
- Type: Performing arts center

Construction
- Opened: May 5, 1987
- Architect: Eugene Aubry

Tenants
- Houston Grand Opera; Houston Ballet

Website
- www.houstonfirsttheaters.com

The Wortham Theater Center is a performing arts center located in downtown Houston, Texas, United States. The Wortham Theater Center, designed by Eugene Aubry of Morris Architects, was built out of private funds totaling over $66 Million. The City of Houston owns the building, and the Houston First Corporation operates the facility.

== History ==
The Wortham Theater Center officially launched on May 9, 1987. The inaugural performance, Tango Argentino, was performed in the Brown Theatre. The Knee Plays, written by Robert Wilson and lead singer David Byrne of Talking Heads, was presented by the Society for the Performing Arts in the Cullen Theater.

In 2017 it was damaged by Hurricane Harvey; it reopened in September 2018.

On April 14, 2025, George Foreman Memorial is opened to the public and was sold out. A million fans who could not get a ticket, were outside the theater to pay respects for George Foreman.

== Significant Private Funding ==
A significant portion of the funding needed to build the center came from the estate of the late Gus Wortham (1891–1976), a local philanthropist and founder of American General Insurance Company. The Wortham Foundation contributed $20 million to the construction of the new Theater Center, which was named after Wortham. In spite of the banking and oil recession of the late 1980s, more than 3,500 donors committed funds for the new facility in a major community effort, with nearly 2,200 individuals donating $100 or less to the capital campaign. Additionally, the Cullen Foundation contributed $7.5 million, and the Brown Foundation gave $6 million to the building fund.

== Performance facilities ==
- The Brown Theater, with 2,405 seats, is named for donors Alice and George Brown. It is used primarily for opera and large ballet productions by two resident companies: the Houston Ballet and the Houston Grand Opera.
- The Cullen Theater, with 1,100 seats, is named for donors Lillie and Roy Cullen. It is used for smaller productions and other events.

== Additional Facts ==
The Houston Ballet began its residency at the center on September 2, 1987, with Janie Parker and Li Cunxin starring in the world premiere of Ben Stevenson's production of Romeo and Juliet. This was followed by Houston Grand Opera's first season, on October 15, 1987, with Plácido Domingo and Mirella Freni in a production of Verdi's Aida.

The glass entry archway, 88-feet (27-m) tall, was originally designed to be the end of a glass atrium, but the atrium concept was considered incompatible with Houston's hot summer weather and the danger of hurricanes, so the atrium was omitted during construction. There had been a debate about how to re-design the entry section as a non-atrium structure, but the decision was to leave the connecting archway, as designed, and simply enclose it with glass. In the future, the archway could easily be extended, if an entry structure is added.

The Helen Hayes Chandelier, hanging in the Green Room, was originally installed in 1911 at New York City's Fulton Theater (renamed as Helen Hayes Theatre in 1955). During the demolition of that theater, the chandelier was purchased by Houstonians Billy and Janie Lisa Price, who donated it to Wortham Center.

The grand staircase, which is actually a bank of escalators, is surrounded by a site-specific illuminated installation by renowned New York sculptor Albert Paley. To avoid extensive last-minute debates about approving the sculpture by the artwork committee, the illuminated structure was categorized as an issue of lighting/electrical design, not subject to the artwork committee's oversight.

A unique acoustic feature of the theater is its "frying pan" pods, accessible via walkways over the rear of the orchestra seating. This construction enables the music to flow between these pods and into sections of the opera hall that is traditionally not considered a good listening area.

== 2017 Hurricane Damage ==
The center was damaged by a flood caused by Hurricane Harvey in August 2017. While the structure was undamaged, the storm and its aftermath left 12 feet (3.7 m) of water, dirt, and debris in the lower levels of the center. Management determined that repairs to the facility would take until at least September 2018.

Water breached the backstage door and other locations, filling the entire basement with 12 feet of water which destroyed mechanical equipment, electrical gear, and other building systems located in the basement level. Water also filled the orchestra pits which were also in the basement. There was water damage to the stage flooring and other finishes on the ground level. A team including Turner Construction, HKA/ARUP, and Manhattan Construction led the restoration of the theater and rehearsal spaces to its original glory. Jaffe Holden Acoustics provided acoustic and audio/video systems design services in eight short months to ensure the curtain could open in time for the fall 2018 Opera season.
