= Pioneer Memorial (Houston) =

Granite obelisk and memorial in Houston, Texas, U.S.

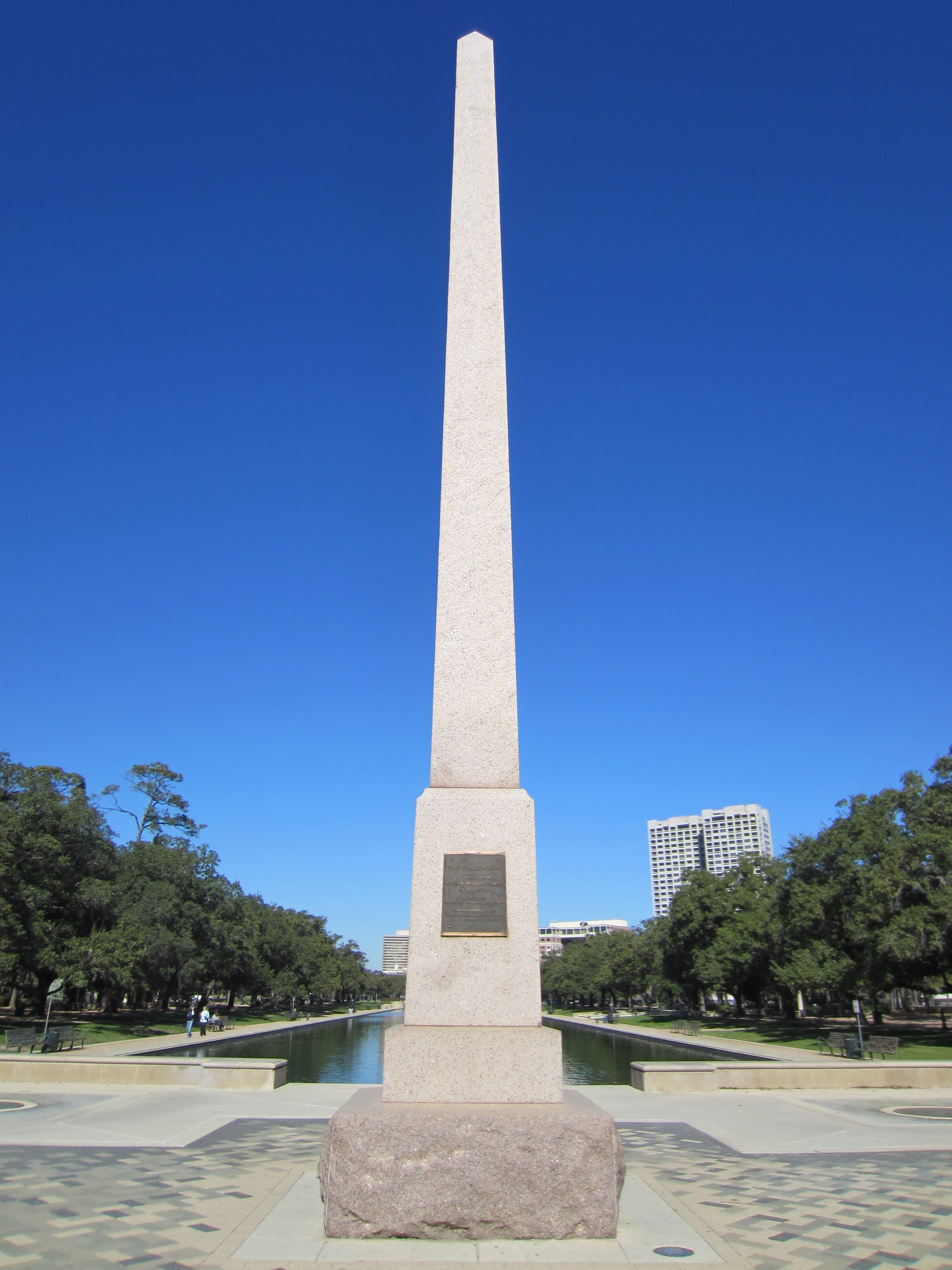
- The memorial in 2012
- Artist: Frank Teich
- Year: 1936
- Type: Sculpture
- Medium: Granite
- Location: Houston, Texas, United States; 29.718634°N 95.390932°W

Pioneer Memorial is an outdoor 1936 granite obelisk by Frank Teich, erected in Hermann Park in Houston, Texas, in the United States.

== See also ==
- 1936 in art
- List of public art in Houston
