= Mary Gibbs and Jesse H. Jones Reflection Pool =

Reflecting pool in Houston, Texas, U.S.

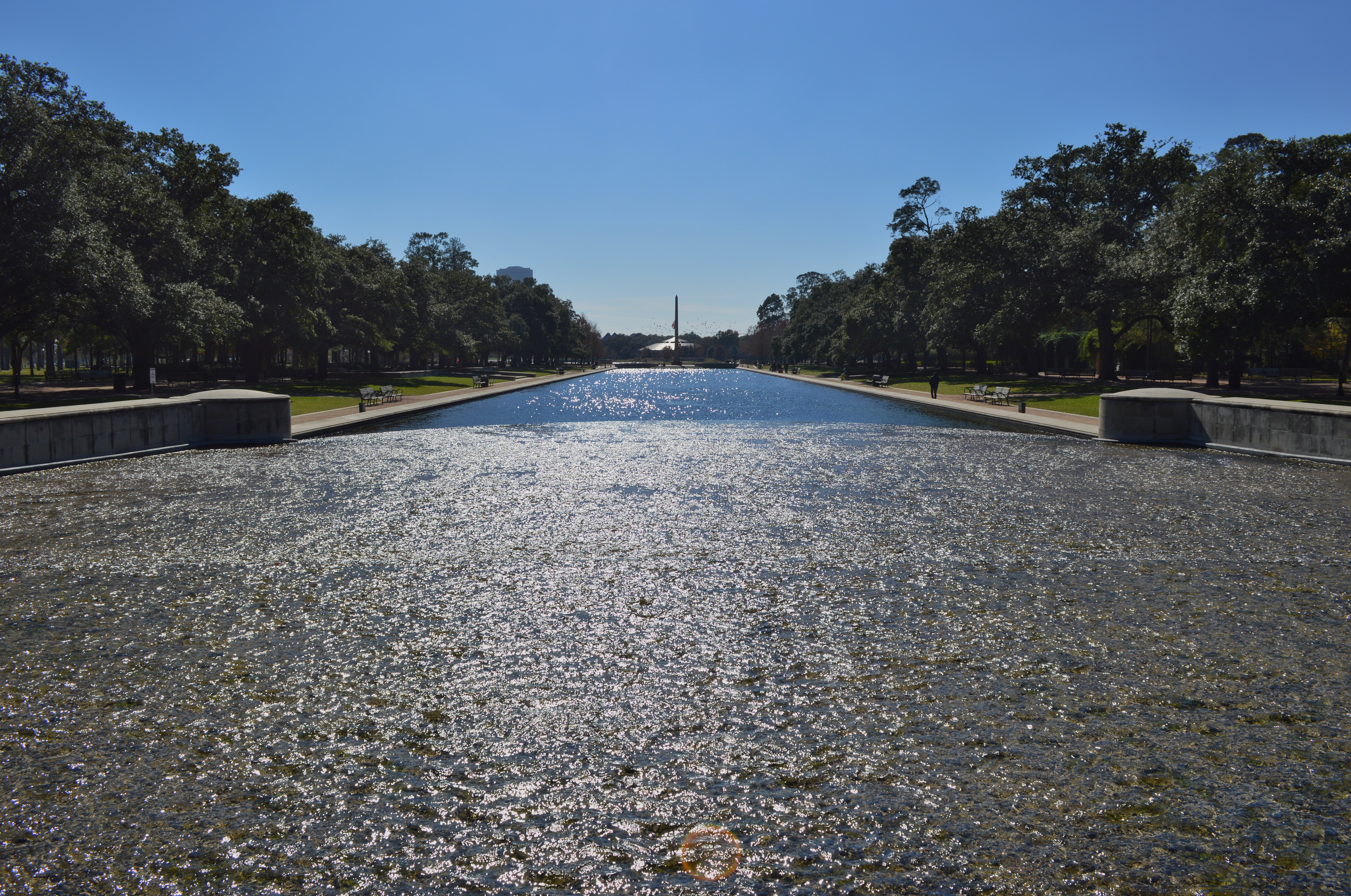
- Location: Hermann Park, Texas, U.S.
- 29°43′11″N 95°23′27″W

The Mary Gibbs and Jesse H. Jones Reflection Pool is a reflecting pool in Houston's Hermann Park, in the U.S. state of Texas.

The design of the Houston Zoo's Reflection Pool is meant to be a replica of the Mary Gibbs and Jesse H. Jones Reflection Pool.
