= Japanese Garden (Houston) =

Japanese garden in Houston, Texas, U.S.

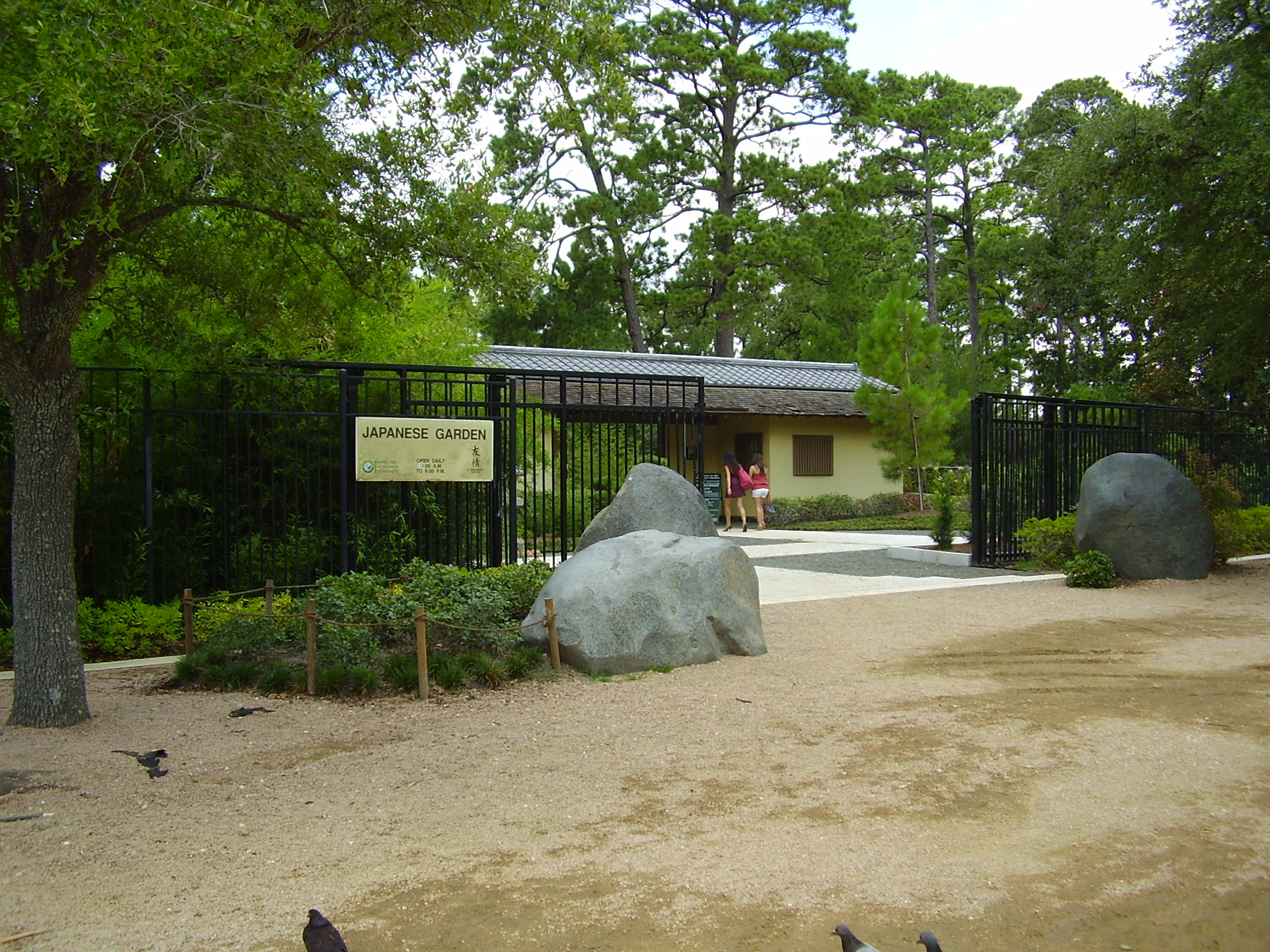
- Entrance to the garden, 2009
- Interactive map of Japanese Garden
- Location: Hermann Park, Houston, Texas, United States
- Coordinates: 29°43′9″N 95°23′32″W
- Area: 5.5 acres (2.2 ha)
- Opened: 1992
- Designer: Ken Nakajima

Houston's Japanese Garden is a 5.5-acre (2.2 ha) Japanese garden in Hermann Park, in the U.S. state of Texas. The garden was designed by Tokyo landscape designer Ken Nakajima and opened in 1992.

== History ==
In 1988, Consul General of Japan in Houston Yasuo Hori (堀靖夫 Hori Yasuo) began meeting with Mayor of Houston Kathy Whitmire to discuss the possibility of a Japanese garden in Houston. After talks with the Japanese Business Association of Houston (ヒューストン日本商工会, Hyūsuton Nihon Shōkōkai), Japanese Garden Inc. was founded to raise funds for the potential garden's design and construction. Transient Japanese businessmen were not consistently involved with the enterprise, but contributed to the effort as their time in Houston allowed.

In 1990, Japanese Prime Minister Toshiki Kaifu arrived in Houston for the 16th G7 Summit. As a gesture of goodwill towards the city, he arranged for the donation of a traditional Japanese teahouse by the Japan World Exposition 1970 Commemorative Fund. Constructed in Japan with traditional materials, the teahouse was broken down and shipped to Houston, where it would be reassembled by Japanese craftsmen without use of a single nail. Before the structure arrived for reassembly, Tokyo landscape architect Ken Nakajima was commissioned to plan the garden. He wrote of the project, "We must work with nature to create a new space and sense of beauty. This is the essence of the Japanese garden."

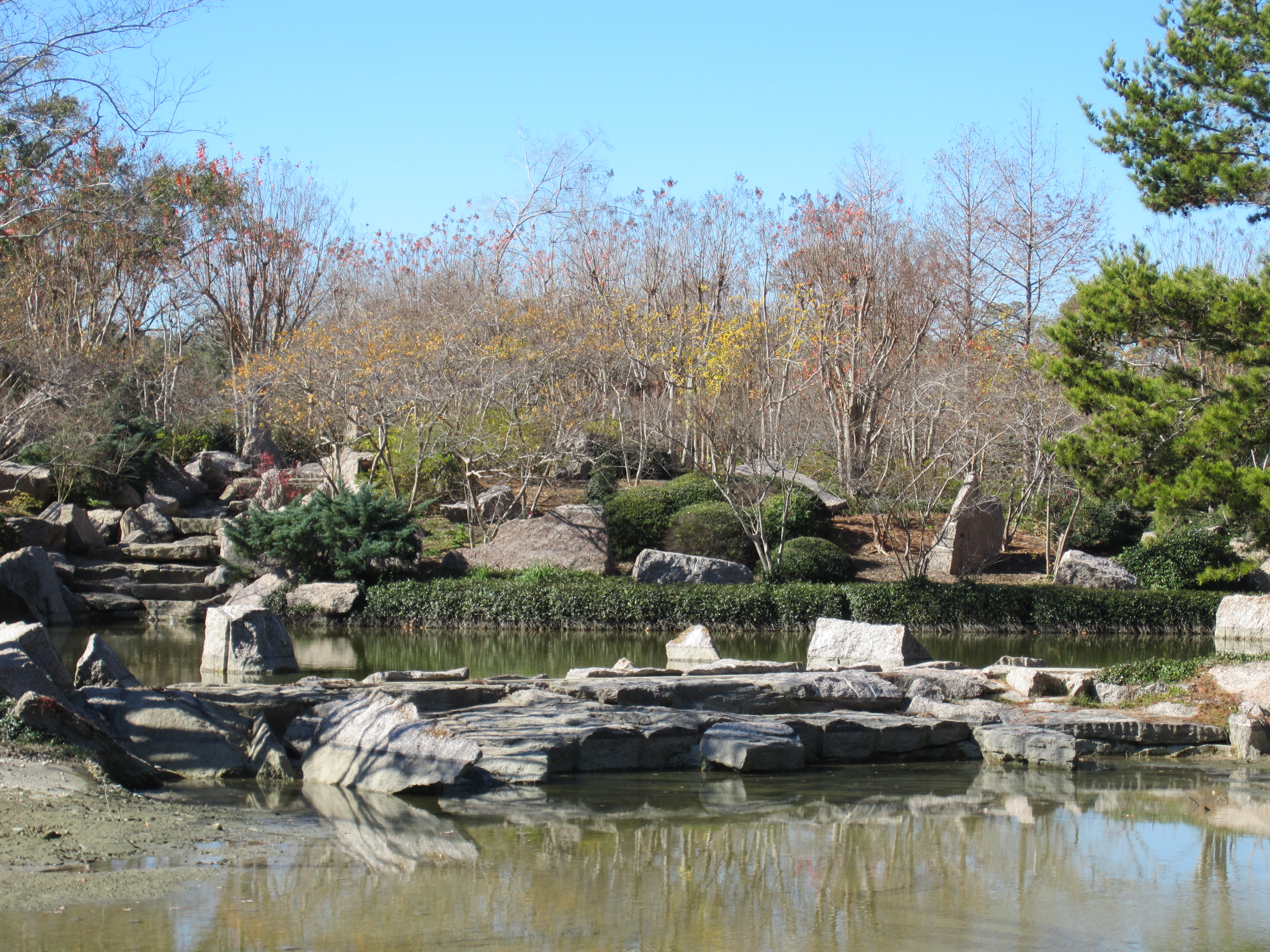
The garden in 2012

After a groundbreaking on March 26, 1991, the garden's structural elements were complete before the teahouse arrived. Houstonian landscape architect Lauren Griffith worked with Nakajima to select plants appropriate for both the local climate and a traditional Japanese aesthetic. After fourteen months of teahouse assembly and plant installation, the Hermann Park's Japanese Garden was dedicated on May 4, 1992.

By 2006, the garden's traditional Japanese aesthetic had been Americanized. Houstonian Kunio Minami remembers that american annuals such as petunias and pansies had been planted with little consideration for the garden's original design. In response, Nakajima's successor, Terunobu Nakai, was hired to lead a restoration effort. Visiting Houston annually until his death in 2012, Nakai and his associates restored Nakajima's original vision. Nakai taught local gardeners the sukashi pruning method, and noted that flowers should not play a large part in traditional Japanese gardens, which use flowers with solitary blooms like irises and lilies to emphasize form over a mass of color. During his final visit in 2011, Nakai met with White Oak Studio's landscape architect Jim Patterson to discuss improvements to the Fannin Street side of Hermann Park, and a potential second entrance to the Japanese Garden to serve the Hermann Park/Rice University MetroRail station.

Nakai's work was taken over by Aya Hashimoto, who focused her 2012 visit on improving the garden's perimeter and planning for the new gate.

An episode of Houston Public Media TV-8's Arts InSight was filmed in the garden in 2014. In 2017, the garden hosted the Hermann Park Conservancy's fifteenth annual "Evening in the Park" fundraiser. The event commemorated the garden's 25th anniversary and raised more than $600,000 for restoration efforts.

== Design and flora ==
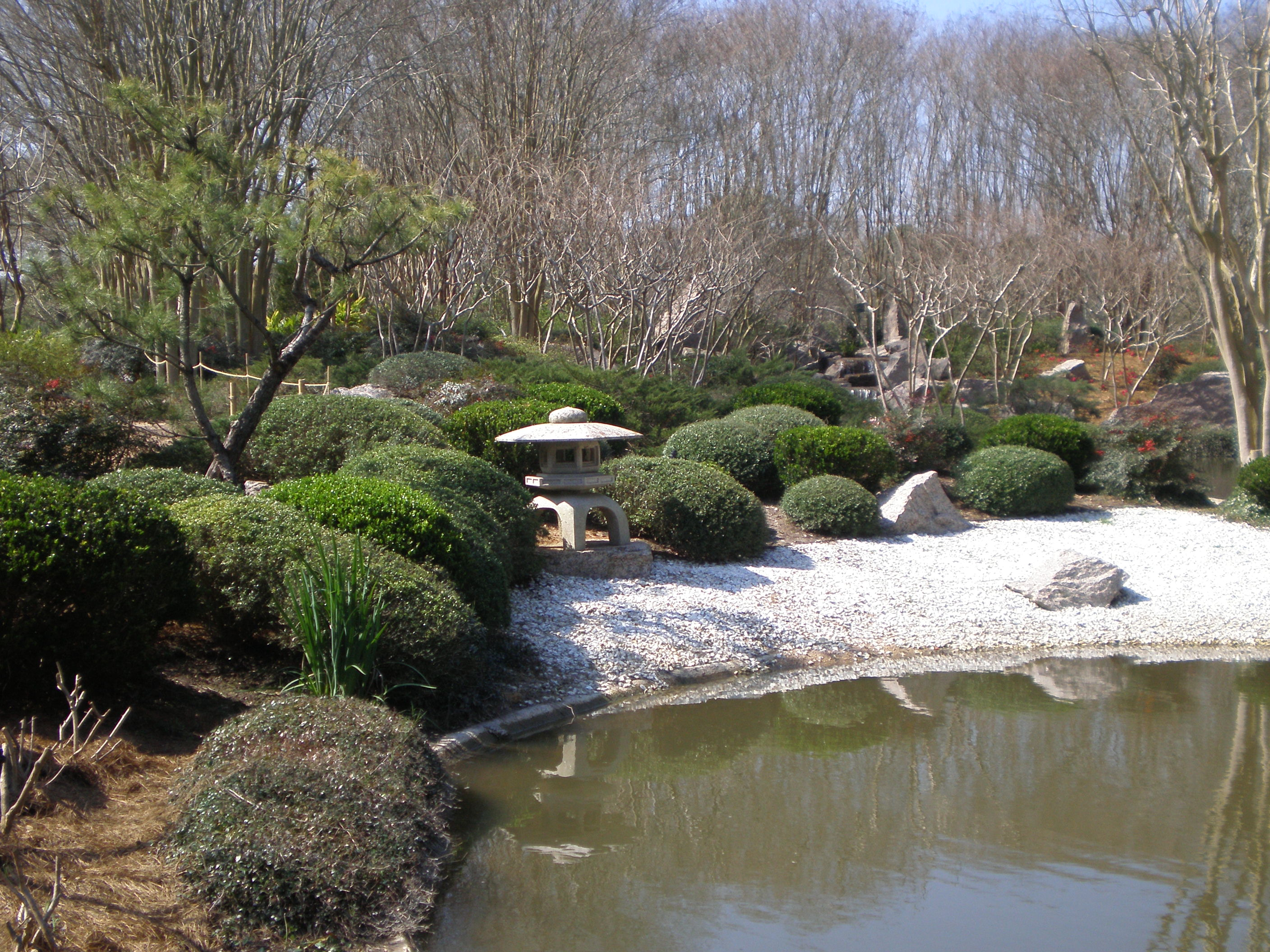
Part of the garden in 2008

Houston's Japanese Garden is designed in the daimyo style, reminiscent of gardens designed by feudal Japanese warlords. Emphasizing meandering footpaths, the garden's plan encourages a leisurely stroll throughout a variety of landscape elements and water features. A traditional Japanese garden's rock formation would consist of naturally weathered stones, but Houston's lack of any such stones led Nakajima to personally select boulders of quarried pink granite from the Marble Falls area. He remarked of the substitution that, "The overwhelming force of the massive rocks seemed symbolic of Texas."

Visitors enter the garden through a traditional gateway, with rooms on either side used to house a ticket booth, utility room, and restrooms inconspicuously. A stone lantern at the gateway serves to symbolically light one's way as they enter the garden. Typically the only monuments or sculpture used in design of traditional Japanese gardens, three other stone lanterns are placed throughout the gardens, including two yukumi-style snow viewing lanterns. Both positioned traditionally near the edge of water, one lantern, gifted to Houston by her sister city, Chiba, Japan, is across the pond from the teahouse; another is near the garden's gazebo, which provides a place to rest near the edge of a stream.

Crepe myrtles, azaleas, Japanese Maples, redbuds, dogwoods, peach trees, brazilwoods, and cherry trees have been cultivated, accompanied by a preexisting grove of old pine trees. In 1992, Nakajima also mentioned 30 varieties of grasses and 121 varieties of shrubs on a list of plants he decorated the garden with.

The Japanese Garden is about 90 percent organic, both as a reflection of traditional Japanese horticulture, and to protect the pond's Koi population.

== Reception ==
In her 2007 book The Garden Lover's Guide to Houston, Eileen Houston said the Japanese Garden "will soothe the harried soul". In 2014, CBS Houston included the Japanese Garden in a list of the city's best botanical gardens. The garden has been included in the first and second editions of 100 Things to Do in Houston Before You Die (2015 and 2018, respectively).

== See also ==
- History of the Japanese in Houston
