= Hermann Park Golf Course =

Golf course in Houston, Texas, United States

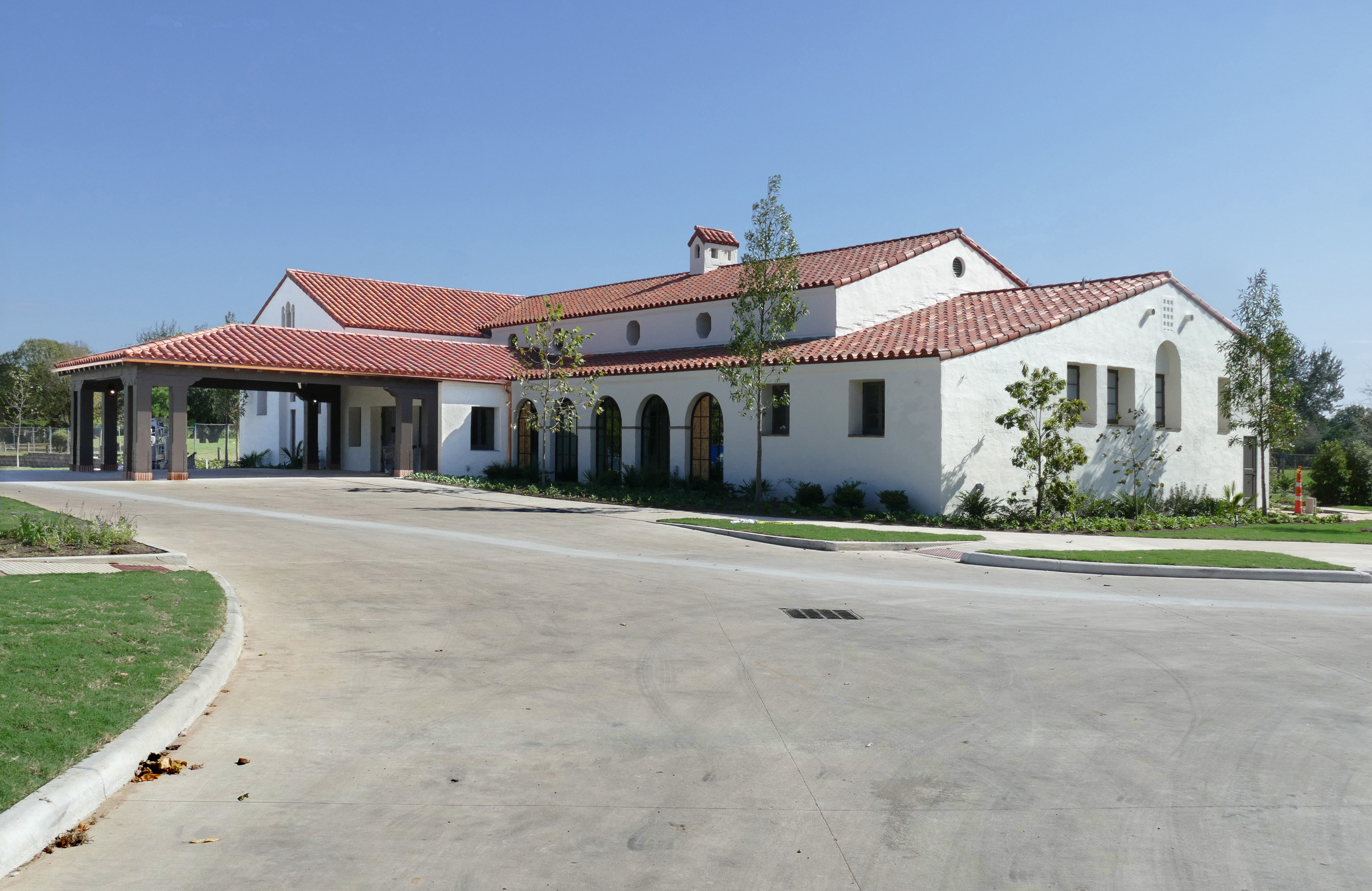
- Old Clubhouse. On National Register

- Location within Texas
- 29.71417°N 95.38222°W

Club information
- Location: Houston, Texas, U.S.

Hermann Park Golf Course is a golf course in Houston's Hermann Park, in the U.S. state of Texas. The course was renovated in 1999.

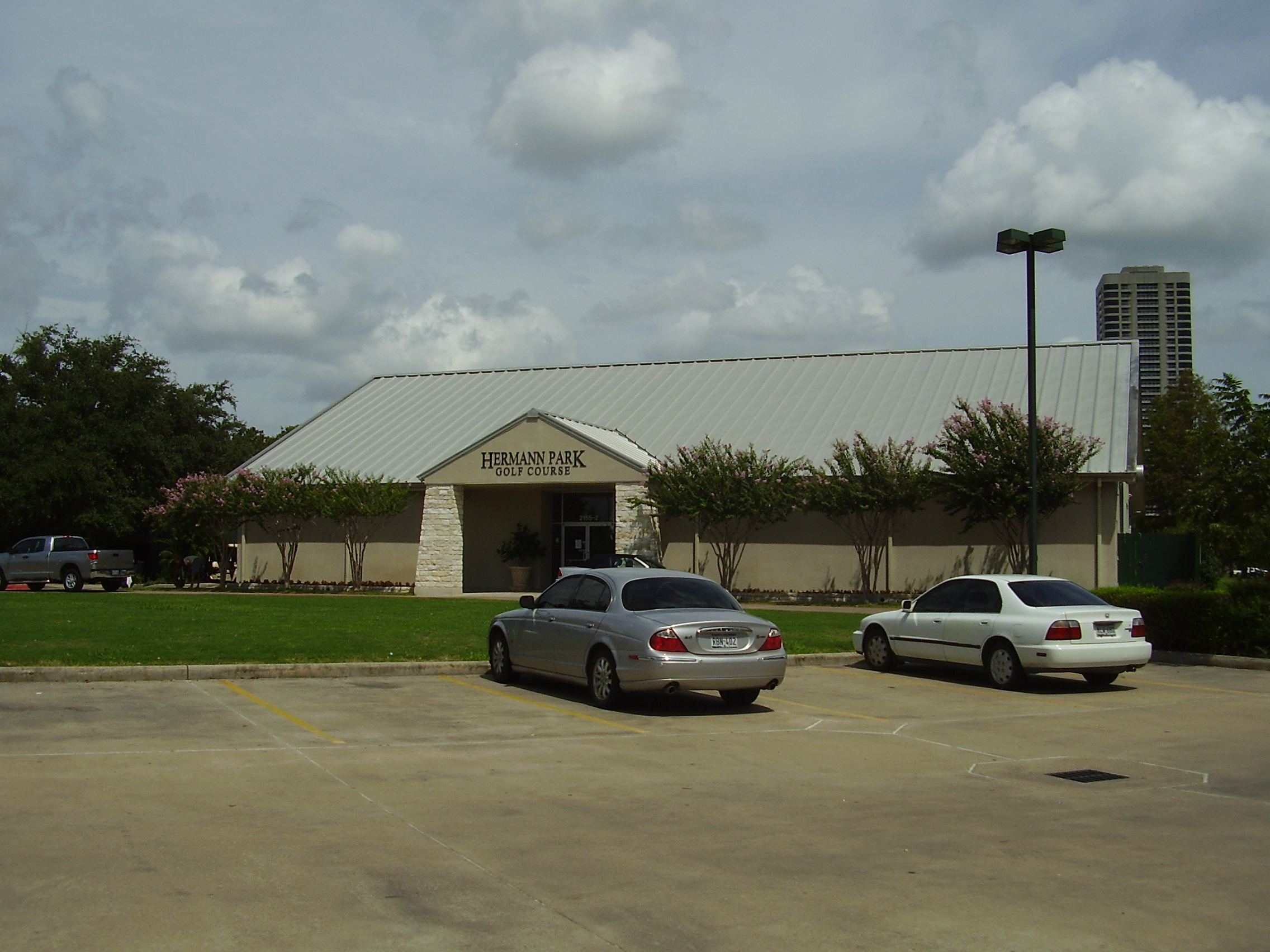
Clubhouse entrance, 2009
