= Houston First Corporation =

Local government corporation in Houston, Texas, U.S.

Houston First logo

Houston First Corporation is a local government corporation that operates performing arts and convention facilities in Houston, the largest city in U.S. state of Texas. These venues include the George R. Brown Convention Center, Wortham Theater Center, Jones Hall for the Performing Arts, and the Miller Outdoor Theatre. Houston First also owns the city's largest hotel, the 1,200-room Hilton Americas-Houston.

Houston First represents the consolidation of the former City of Houston Convention & Entertainment Facilities Department and the Houston Convention Center Hotel Corporation. Houston First was established by Houston City Council on June 1, 2011, and launched on July 1, 2011.

== History ==
After Houston City Council approved the creation of Houston First, Mayor Annise D. Parker said the consolidation was undertaken to create operational efficiencies and to take advantage of “business practices that will make it easier to maintain and improve the GRB and ensure it stays in cutting-edge condition.”

In January 2012, Houston First unveiled a new 2025 master plan for the convention center that called for expansion to the north and south of the building along with at least one additional convention center hotel. Houston First entered into an agreement with RIDA Development Corporation to develop a 1,000-room Marriott Marquis near the north end of the convention center.

In June 2014, Houston First and the Greater Houston Convention and Visitors Bureau officially joined forces as a single, clear voice for the City of Houston. The alignment was designed to create a central, one-stop organization for promoting Houston as a prime convention and tourism destination. Today, Houston First serves as the official destination marketing organization for Houston.

Construction of the connected Marriott Marquis was completed in December 2016, just in time for Houston to host Super Bowl LI in February 2017. The master 2025 plan also called for the boulevard in front of the George R. Brown Convention Center to be converted into a pedestrian plaza. The new Avenida Plaza opened on December 16, 2016.

== Assets and Responsibilities ==
In addition to the downtown convention center and the 1,200-room Hilton Americas, properties falling under the management of Houston First include Wortham Theater Center, Jones Hall for the Performing Arts, Jones Plaza, Miller Outdoor Theatre, Theater District Parking, Sesquicentennial Park, Root Memorial Square, Talento Bilingue de Houston and several other smaller park and performing arts facilities.

== Governance ==
David Mincberg chairs Houston First's Board of Directors. He was appointed by Houston Mayor Sylvester Turner to succeed Ric Campo in July 2016. Mincberg is CEO of Houston-based Flagship Properties Corporation. Michael Heckman is president and chief executive officer of the organization.

=== Board Members ===
(Houston's mayor appoints and City Council confirms Houston First's board members.)

- David Mincberg, chairman, Flagship Properties Corporation
- Sofia Adrogué, Diamond & McCarthy LLP
- Alex Brennan-Martin, Brennan's of Houston
- Elizabeth Gonzales Brock, CenterPoint Energy
- Nicki Keenan, Landry's, Inc.
- Desrye M. Morgan, Wells Fargo Securities
- Reginald L. Martin Jr., Executive Chef
- Ryan Martin, LDR Investment Group
- Paul Puente, Houston Gulf Coast Building and Construction Trades Council
- Tom Segesta, General Manager, Four Seasons Hotel - Houston
- Bobby Singh, Isani Consultants
- Gerald Womack, Womack Development and Investment
- Jay Zeidman, Altitude Ventures

=== City Council Advisory Members (Non-Voting) ===
- Dave Martin, District E
- Robert Gallegos, District I

=== Senior Staff ===
- Michael Heckman, president & CEO
- Paul Casso, vice president of event service
- Alfred Cervantes, senior vice president - film
- Holly Clapham-Rosenow, chief marketing officer
- Jorge Franz, senior vice president - tourism
- John Gonzalez, senior vice president and general manager - facilities
- Lisa Hargrove, general counsel
- Roksan Okan-Vick, senior vice president - regional product development
- John Solis, senior vice president - sales
- Luther Villagomez, chief operating officer - convention center
- Karen Williams, senior vice president, finance
- Frank Wilson, chief financial officer
