= Hermann Park/Rice University station =

Light rail station in Houston, Texas, US

Hermann Park/Rice U
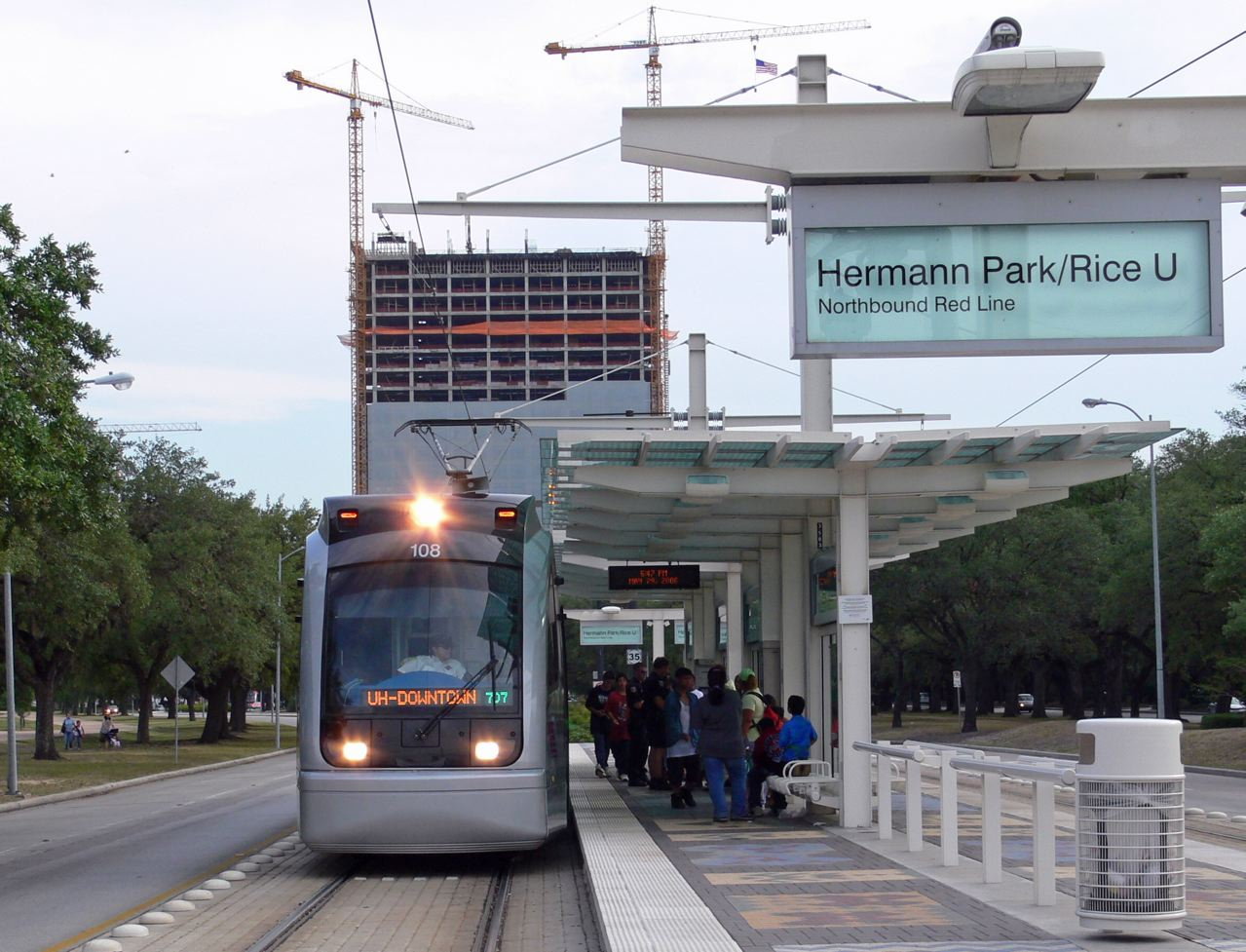

General information
- Location: 6098 Fannin Street; Houston, Texas
- Coordinates: 29°43′12.06″N 95°23′36.81″W
- Owner: Metropolitan Transit Authority of Harris County
- Line: Red Line
- Platforms: Island platform
- Tracks: Two
- Connections: METRO: 56, 291, 292, 298; Hermann Park Railroad

Construction
- Structure type: At-grade
- Accessible: Yes

History
- Opened: January 1, 2004; 22 years ago

Services
Preceding station	METRORail	Following station
Memorial Hermann Hospital/Houston Zoo toward Fannin South	Red Line	Museum District toward Northline Transit Center/HCC
Location

Hermann Park/Rice U is a light rail station in south-central Houston, Texas, United States. The station serves the Red Line of the METRORail system. It is located on the western side of Hermann Park at the intersection of Fannin Street and Sunset Boulevard.

The station serves Hermann Park and the main entrance of Rice University. The station is adjacent to a stop on the Hermann Park Railroad, a narrow-gauge tourist train, as well as a BCycle bike-share kiosk.

== History ==
Hermann Park was first proposed as a rail destination in 1990 plans for Houston's rail network. When a rail line along Main Street was approved in 2000, Hermann Park was one of the destinations the route intended to serve.

To fit with the greenspace aesthetic of Hermann Park, the station was decorated with a garden-themed floor mosaic. On November 1, 2003, METRO used the station as the location of a preliminary train tour.

The station opened on January 1, 2004, as one of sixteen inaugural METRORail stations. An opening ceremony was held at the station, which featured live Zydeco music, a petting zoo, and horse carriage rides.

In February 2017, a Rice University professor on a bicycle was struck and killed by an oncoming train at the station. This, as well as another fatal incident at the adjacent intersection of Main Street and Sunset Boulevard the following year, prompted a redesign of the pedestrian and bicyclist crossings leading up to the station. The incident also led to METRO redesigning its train livery to include bright reflective striping for better visibility.
