= McGovern Lake =

Lake in Houston, Texas

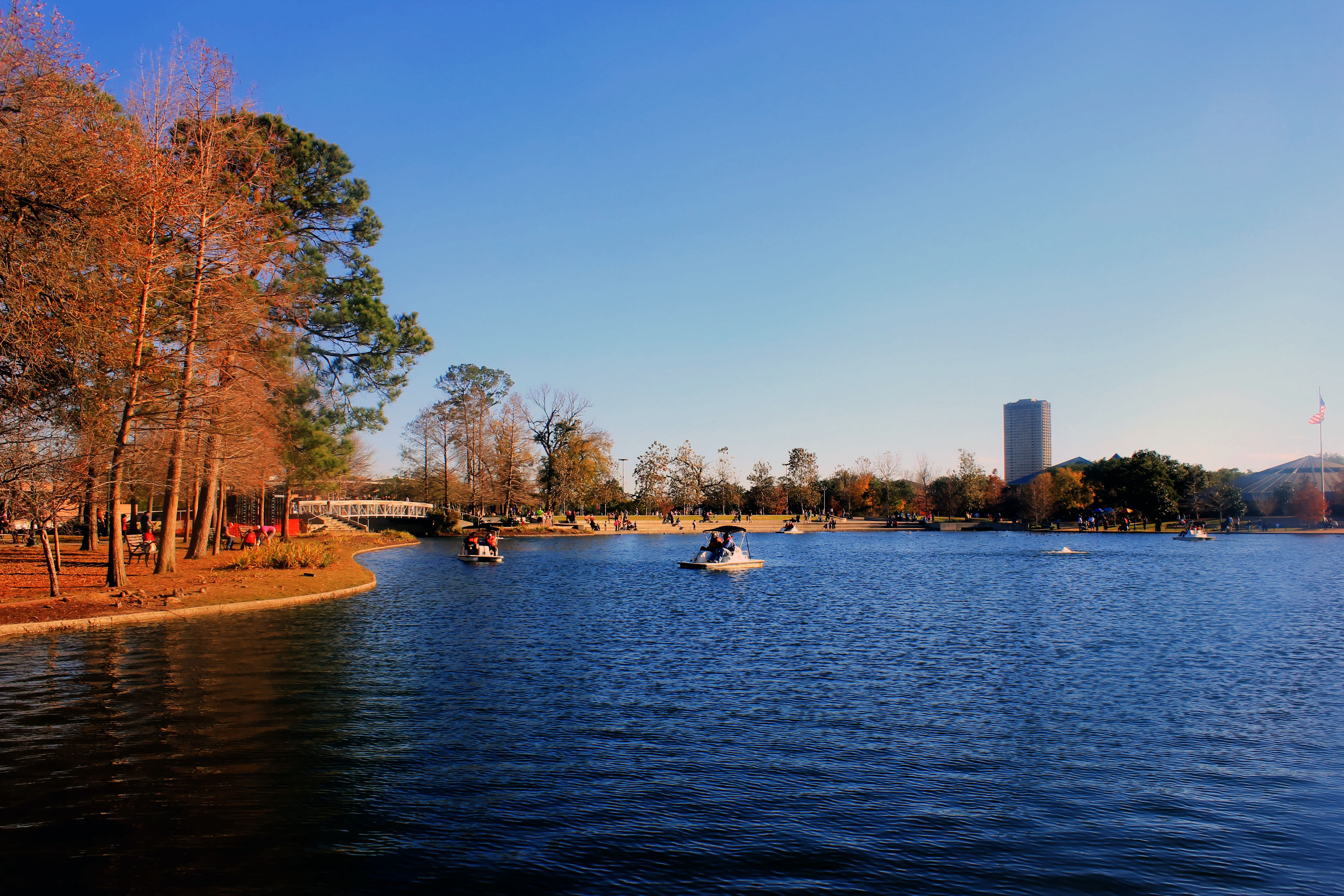
- The lake in 2014

- Location in Texas
- Location: Houston, Texas, U.S.
- Coordinates: 29.7174°N 95.391°W

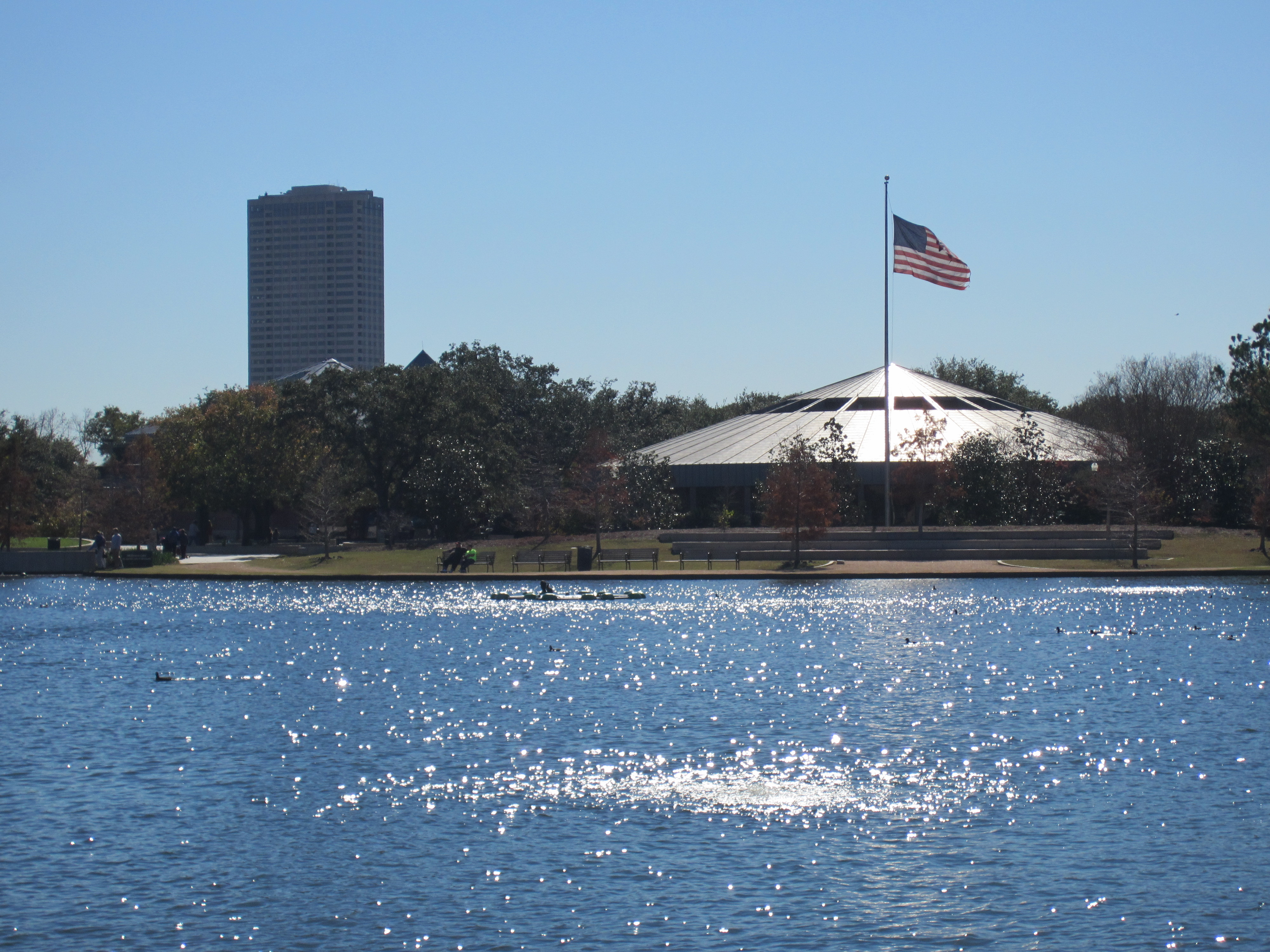
The lake in 2012

McGovern Lake is an 8-acre (3.2 ha) lake in Houston's Hermann Park, in the U.S. state of Texas.

== Description and history ==
The lake has been described as "the sparkling jewel that anchors the park and its surrounding attractions". It has three islands, two of which are designated for migratory birds. Visitors can fish at Bob's Fishing Pier or ride pedal boats.

The lake was expanded and restored during 1999–2001, and was reopened by Mayor Lee Brown in April 2001. The project cost $4 million. The Texas Parks and Wildlife Department restocked the lake, and fishing permits started being issued again in 2002. Species include bass and bluegill.

== Fishing ==
Fishing is available at McGovern Lake for senior citizens over 65 years old and children under 12 years old and is catch and release only. Species include bass and bluegill.

== Birds ==
Two of the three islands on McGovern Lake are designated habitats for migratory birds. Some observed species include Muscovy Duck, Black-bellied Whistling-Duck, and Mallard.

== See also ==
- List of lakes in Texas
