= Mecom Fountain =

Landmark fountain in Houston, Texas

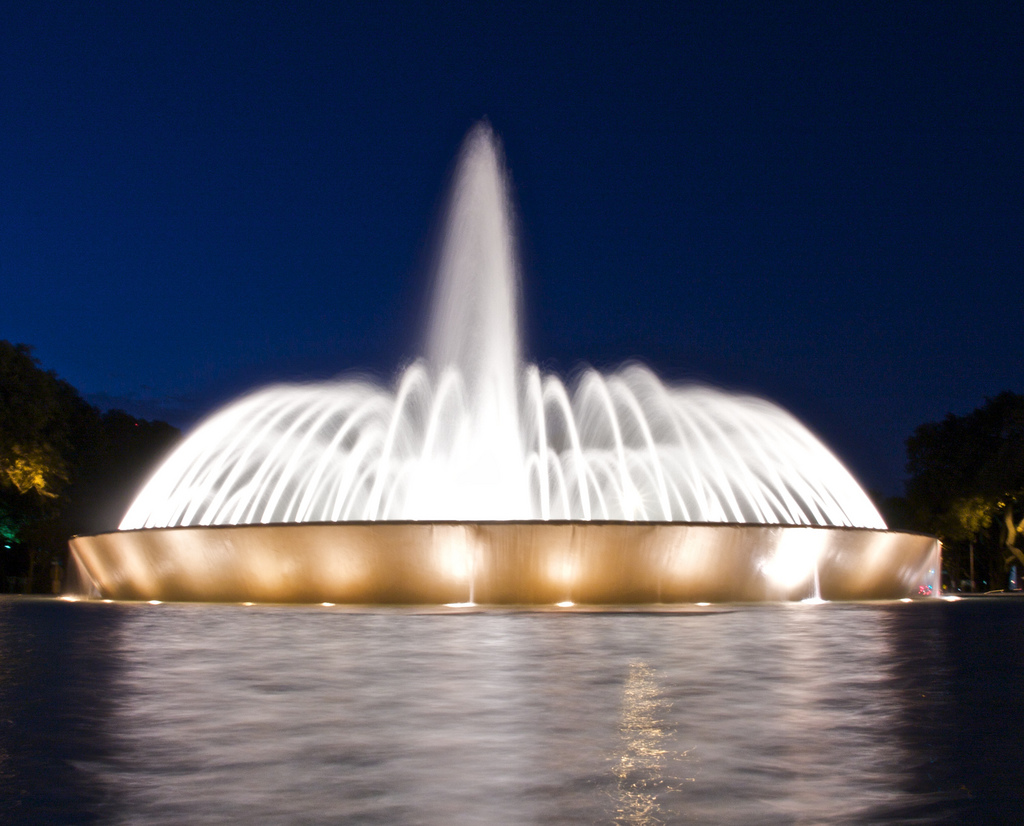
- The fountain in 2008
- Year: 1964
- Location: Hermann Park, Houston, United States; 29°43′26″N 95°23′28″W
- Website: hermannpark.org/place/mecom-fountain/

Mecom Fountain is a 1964 fountain designed by Eugene Werlin, located in the traffic circle ("roundabout") at the intersection of Main Street and Montrose Boulevard in Houston, Texas, in the United States. It was presented to the City of Houston by John W. and Mary Mecom and was the largest in the city at the time it was completed.
