= George H. Hermann =

American entrepreneur and philanthropist

- Born: George Henry Hermann; August 6, 1843; Houston, Republic of Texas
- Died: October 21, 1914 (aged 71); Baltimore, Maryland
- Resting place: Glenwood Cemetery, Houston
- Occupation(s): Lumberman, cattleman, oilman
- Known for: Philanthropy

George H. Hermann (August 6, 1843 – October 21, 1914) was an entrepreneur based in Houston, Texas. He served the Confederacy in the American Civil War. He was a dealer in wood products and cattle. He invested in real estate and was an early investor in oilfields around Humble, Texas, which led to a financial windfall from a rich oil strike. He donated most of his estate to the public upon his death, including land for the Houston Museum of Fine Arts and Hermann Park. Land and other assets funded the Hermann Hospital Foundation.

== Early life ==
George Henry Hermann was born on August 6, 1843, to John and Fannie (Mitchell) Hermann in Houston. Both parents were natives of Davos, Switzerland. His father fought in the Battle of Waterloo and traveled to the United States before marrying. John and Fannie traveled to the United States and Mexico before settling in Houston in 1838. John worked as a baker and in the dairy business while accumulating real estate along the way. George was one of seven children, though the only one who survived his youth.

== Career ==
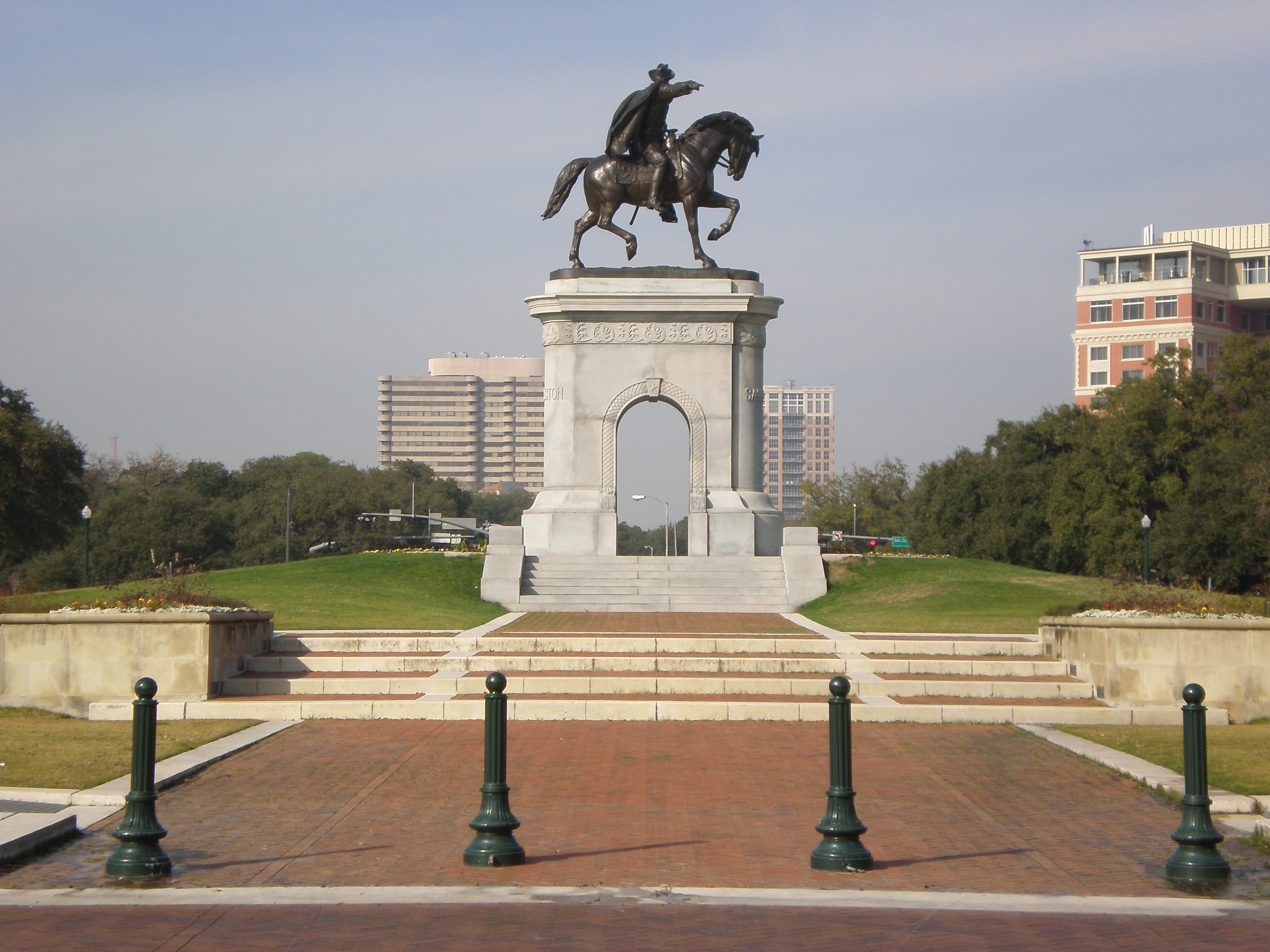

While still a teenager, Hermann enlisted with a Confederate Cavalry company and served in that unit through most of the Civil War. After the war, he engaged in the cattle and real estate businesses, while selling firewood and lumber.

== Death and legacy ==
Hermann died on October 21, 1914, in Baltimore. He was interred at Glenwood Cemetery in Houston. Hermann’s greatest legacy endures in two Houston institutions: Hermann Park and Memorial Hermann Hospital in the Texas Medical Center.

Hermann bequeathed an estate valued at $2.6 million to establish a hospital. The Hermann Hospital Foundation generated income from the sale of Hermann’s real estate and from retaining the mineral rights to those lands. The Hermann estate also gifted land for the Houston Museum of Fine Arts.
