= Miller Outdoor Theatre =

Theatre in Houston, Texas

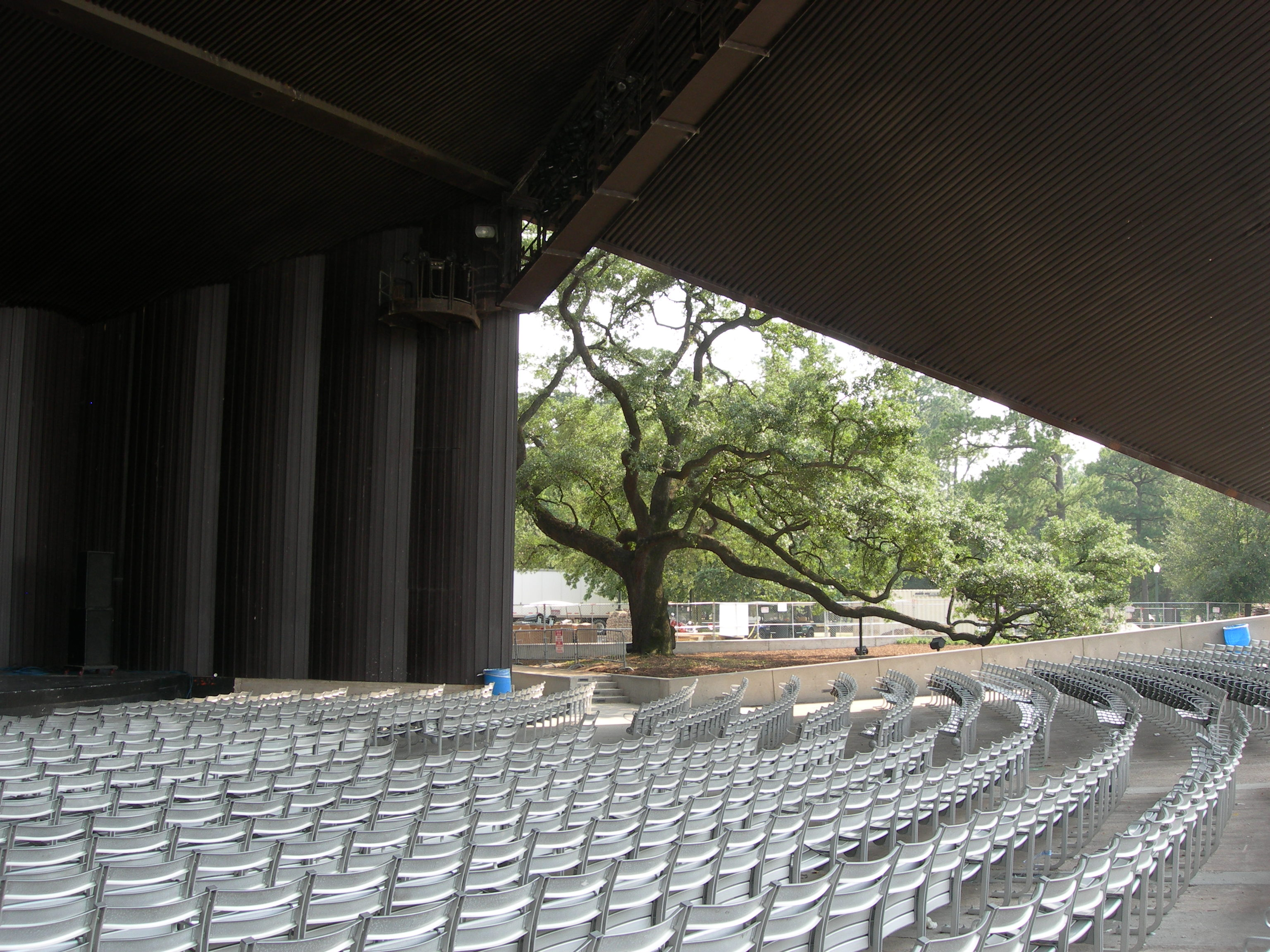
- Seating under the pavilion
- Interactive map of Miller Outdoor Theatre
- Address: 6000 Hermann Park Drive; Houston, Texas; United States
- Coordinates: 29.7191°N 95.3887°W
- Owner: City of Houston
- Operator: Houston First Corporation
- Capacity: 6,200

Construction
- Opened: 1923
- Rebuilt: 1968
- Architects: Eugene Werlin and Associates

Website
- www.milleroutdoortheatre.com

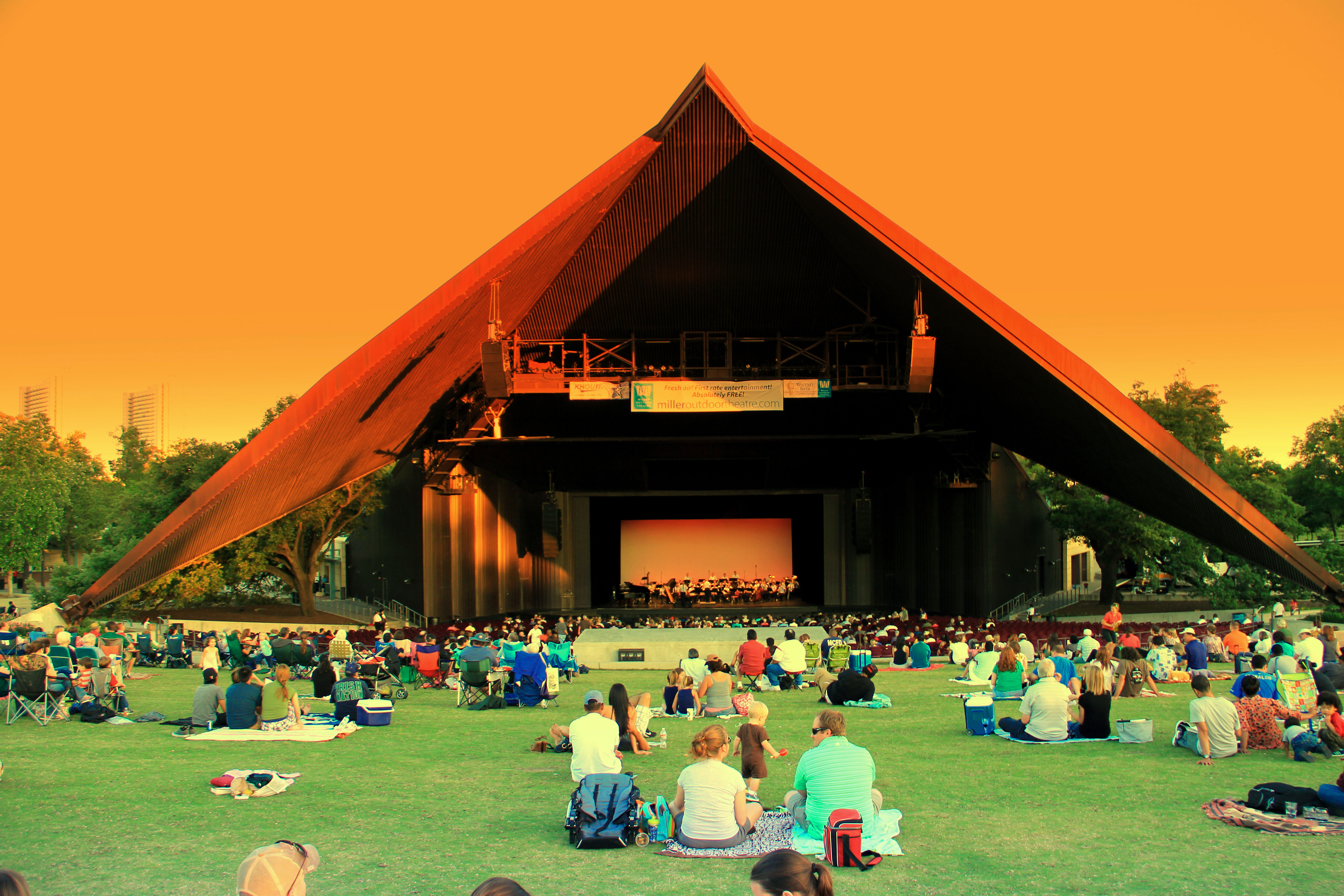
Miller Outdoor Theater Houston

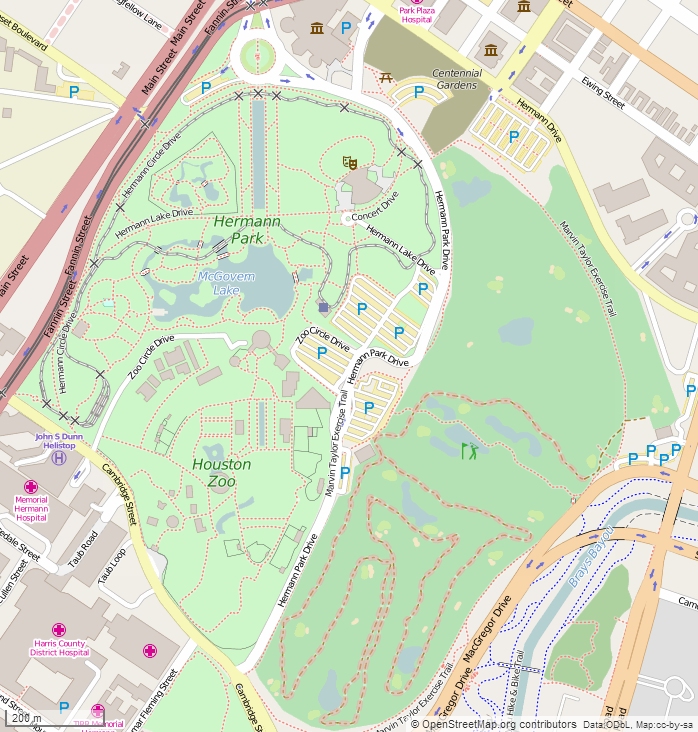
Location within Hermann Park

Miller Outdoor Theatre is an outdoor theater for the performing arts in Houston, Texas. It is located on approximately 7.5 acres (30,000 m^{2}) of land in Hermann Park, at 6000 Hermann Park Drive, Houston, Texas 77030. It was first known in 1922 as Miller Memorial Theatre, for its benefactor Jesse Wright Miller, a mining engineer and cotton broker. The theater offers classical music, jazz, ballet, Shakespeare, musical theater, and classic films, with free performances running from March through November.

== The theatre building ==
Seating is provided for 1,705 patrons, with 20 wheel-chair spaces, plus an 80,000-square-foot (7,400 m^{2}) sloping lawn that accommodates about 4,500 more. The theater building itself consists of a 64' x 41' stage; 54 line sets for hanging lights, curtains, and scenery; an orchestra pit which can be raised and lowered; dressing rooms; offices; a full complement of theatrical equipment; and a 110-ton air conditioning system for cooling the performance area. In its 2010 season, the Miller Outdoor Theatre provided entertainment for more than 430,000 people at 141 performances and events.

== History ==
In 1922, the original theater was designed by William Ward Watkin as an amphitheater surrounded by twenty Corinthian-style limestone columns and built by Tom Tellepsen. The theatre’s dedication plaque reads:

To the Arts of Music, Poetry, Drama and Oratory, by which the striving spirit of man seeks to interpret the words of God. This theatre of the City of Houston is permanently dedicated.

"Miller’s Hill" was created in 1948 with dirt from the excavations of Fannin Street. In 1968, the city built a new theatre with bonds approved by public vote. The new theatre building, designed by Eugene Werlin and Associates, won several awards: the American Iron and Steel Institute’s Biannual Award (1969), the American Institute of Steel Construction’s Award of Excellence, and the James E. Lincoln Arc Welding Foundation Award.

The 1968 Miller Theatre building was then refurbished starting in 1996, jointly funded by the city of Houston and Friends of Hermann Park. The roof and siding were replaced, and additional restrooms and office areas were installed. In addition, a small stage was added to the east end of the facility, playing to a newly incorporated open plaza area. The renovations were completed in 1998. Today, the venue is managed by the Houston First Corporation.
