= Hermann Park =

Park in Houston, Texas, U.S.

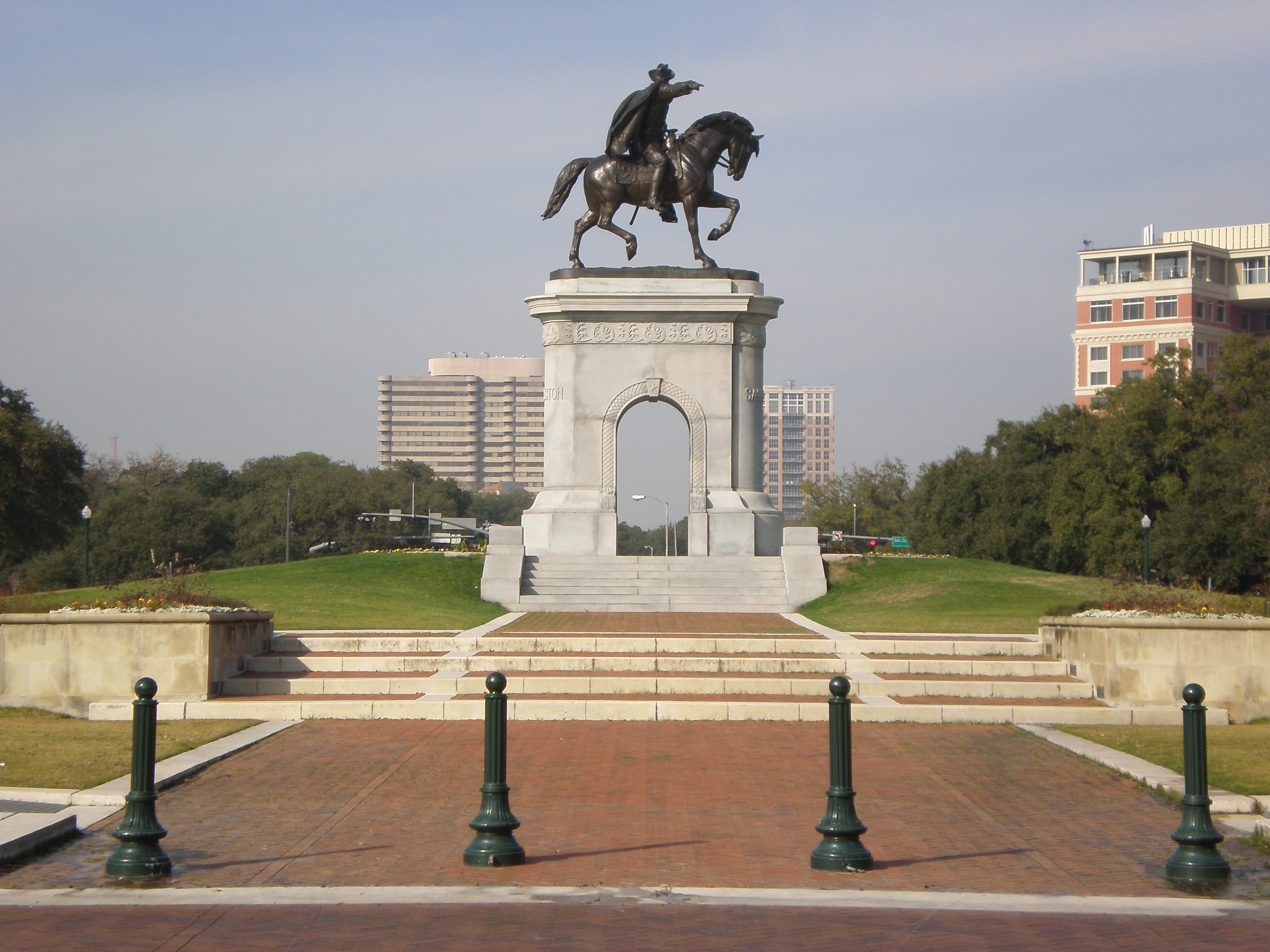
- Sam Houston Monument at the northern end of Hermann Park
- Interactive map of Hermann Park
- Type: Urban park
- Location: Museum District, Houston, Texas, United States
- Coordinates: 29.721°N 95.391°W
- Area: 445 acres (180 ha)
- Created: 1914
- Designer: George Kessler
- Operator: Hermann Park Conservancy; City of Houston
- Visitors: 6 million
- Open: 6 am – 11 pm daily
- Public transit: METRORail Red Line: Hermann Park / Rice University
- Website: www.hermannpark.org

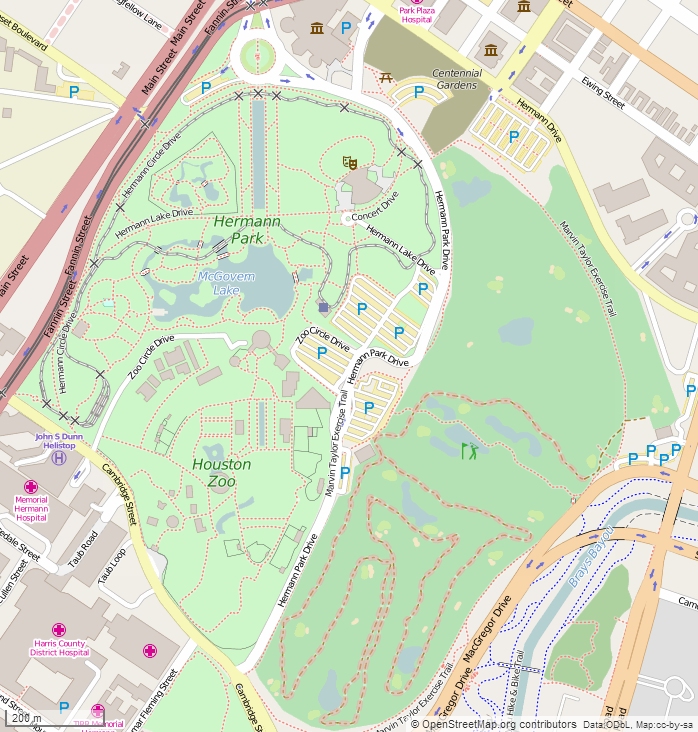
Map of Hermann Park

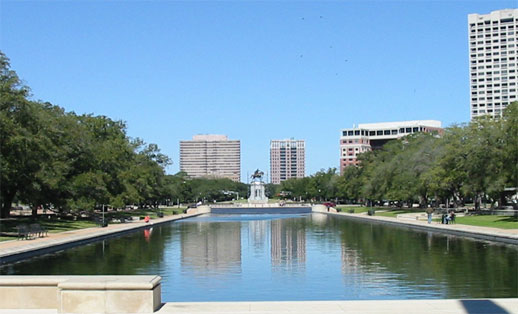
A view of the Mary Gibbs and Jesse H. Jones Reflection Pool and monument to Sam Houston

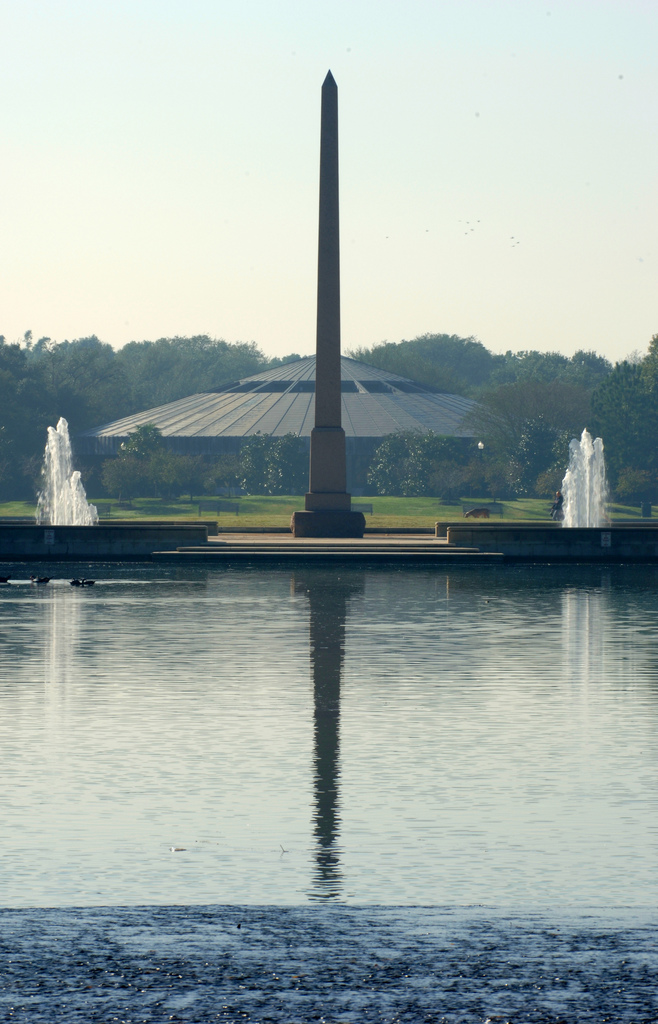
The Pioneer Memorial obelisk stands at the end of the Mary Gibbs and Jesse H. Jones Reflection Pool. It was erected by the San Jacinto Centennial Association and dedicated on August 30, 1936.

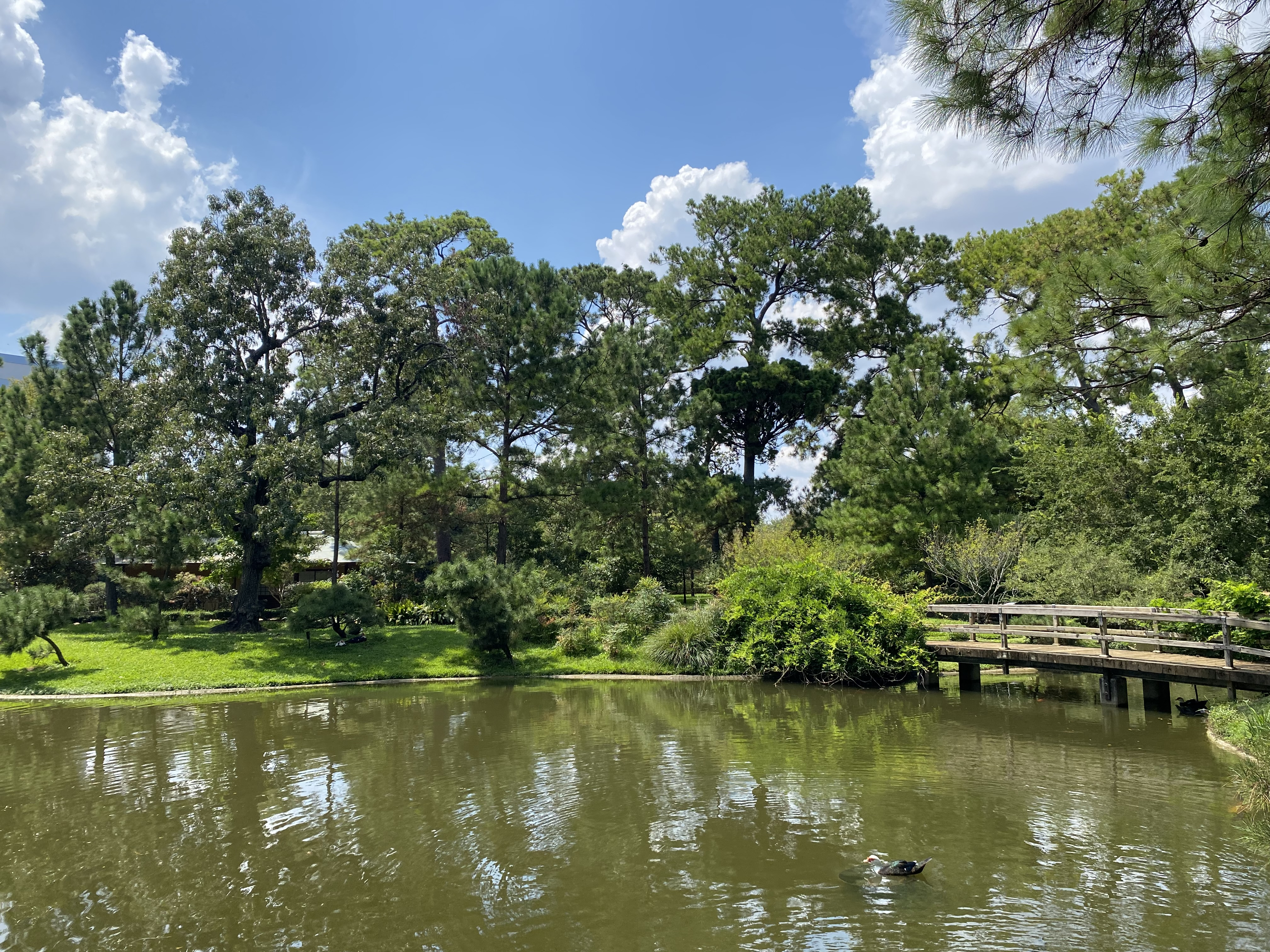
Japanese garden pond in Hermann Park

Hermann Park is a 445-acre (180-hectare) urban park in Houston, Texas, situated at the southern end of the Museum District. The park is located to the immediate north end of the MD Anderson Cancer Center at Texas Medical Center and Brays Bayou, east of Rice University, and slightly west of the Third Ward. Hermann Park is home to numerous cultural institutions including the Houston Zoo, Miller Outdoor Theatre, the Houston Museum of Natural Science, and the Hermann Park Golf Course, which became one of the first desegregated public golf courses in the United States in 1954. The park also features the Mary Gibbs and Jesse H. Jones Reflection Pool, numerous gardens, picnic areas, and McGovern Lake, an 8-acre (32,000 m^{2}) recreational lake.

The opening of the Houston Zoo in 1922 and the requisition of a large southern portion of the park for the establishment of the Texas Medical Center in 1943 fundamentally altered the scope and configuration of the space, though significant elements of the Kessler plan—such as the north-south axis extending from Montrose Boulevard—remain and have been expanded upon. Hermann Park experienced a period of neglect in the latter half of the 20th century due to a lack of funding and maintenance, spurring the formation of the nonprofit Hermann Park Conservancy in 1992. The Conservancy has since leveraged over $120 million of public and private funds to renovate and remake broad areas of the park. Today, Hermann Park welcomes over six million visitors annually; the Houston Zoo was the second most visited paid-admission zoo in the United States in 2016 (behind San Diego Zoo), with over 2.5 million visitors.

Hermann Park is served by the Hermann Park / Rice University station on the METRORail Red Line, which runs along Fannin Street at the western edge of the park.

The Third Ward Redevelopment Council defines Hermann Park as being part of the Third Ward. T. R. Witcher of the Houston Press wrote in 1995 that the park and nearby areas are "not the first places that come to mind when you say "Third Ward,"[...]".

== History ==
=== Initial land acquisition ===
One of Houston's oldest public parks, Hermann Park was created on acreage donated to the City of Houston by cattleman, oilman and philanthropist George H. Hermann (1843–1914). The land was formerly the site of his sawmill. It was first envisioned as part of a comprehensive urban planning effort by the city of Houston in the early 1910s. Following the recommendation of a 1913 report which identified the then-rural area between Main Street and Brays Bayou as ideal for a large urban park, real estate investor and entrepreneur George H. Hermann, who owned most of the area and served on the city's parks board, bequeathed his estate to Houston for use as a public green space in 1914.

=== The Kessler Plan ===
In 1914, Joseph Stephen Cullinan proposed to the Houston park commissioners and Mayor Ben Campbell to hire George E. Kessler to plan Hermann Park. Kessler was already developing public plans for the cities of Dallas and Fort Worth, and the city opted to contract with Kessler, despite the previous work by John Maxcy and Arthur Comey. Two years later, Cullinan purchased a 38-acre wedge of land from the Hermann Estate for his planned gated enclave, Shadyside. He commissioned Kessler to lay out the subdivision. Cullinan chose the site for Shadyside knowing that it would be adjacent to the large swath of land dedicated to the development of public amenities, including Hermann Park. Not only would Kessler ensure that similar aesthetic choices would be implemented at Shadyside and Hermann Park, this coordination prevented commercial development from encroaching on the common sides of the properties.

As with the neighboring development of Shadyside, Kessler devised his plan for Hermann Park with knowledge of other adjacent land tracts dedicated to public use. The Rice University, opened in 1912, lay to the west of the Hermann Park tract. The 295-acre campus was then implementing its own master architectural and landscaping plan developed by Cram Goodhue & Ferguson. To the northwest, adjacent to Shady Acres, was entrusted by George Hermann in 1913 to the Houston Art League, which started planning for an art museum there after 1917.

By 1916, famed landscape architect George Kessler had completed a master plan for the park which was gradually implemented throughout the following decades. Ultimately, Hermann Park and Rice University are two clear expressions of the City Beautiful movement in Houston.

=== Hare & Hare Plan ===
- 1924 – Hermann Park grew to 133.5 acres (54.0 ha) with the addition of the Golf Course in 1922, which completed construction in 1924. Its main feature that it had grass greens as opposed to the more commonly used sand in other cities and was well received by golfers.
- 1936 – for the City’s 100th anniversary, the Daughters of Republic of Texas had a log cabin constructed in Hermann Park as a memorial to pioneer men and women.

=== Mid-century development ===
- 1957 – Southern Pacific steam engine #982 was dedicated at Hermann Park and the Mini-train service was established. The engine was saved after a newspaper letter from Peter Whitney got 75 replies and Southern Pacific donated the engine to the Junior Chamber of Commerce and the city. It took 5 days to move it from Blodgett to the Park, as rails were laid in the streets in front of it. The locomotive was relocated by 50 wheel trailer to Daikin Park in 2005.

=== The Olin Plan ===
In 1993, FHP commissioned a master plan for Hermann Park from Hanna/Olin Partnership of Philadelphia. This Master Plan, created in consultation with the City of Houston and various stakeholders, was adopted in 1997 by Houston City Council. In 1995, Friends of Hermann Park adopted a master plan for Hermann Park that has provided a “blueprint” for all subsequent renovations and enhancements to the Park. In 2004, Friends of Hermann Park changed its name to the Hermann Park Conservancy (HPC) to reflect an institutional and permanent commitment to stewardship of Hermann Park’s natural resources and physical infrastructure.

In an international competition, the Rice Design Alliance invited designers to set the tone and revitalize the main entry and reflecting pool that formed a key axis for Hermann Park, “The Heart of the Park”, and to create a contemporary update to the park's earliest plans by George Kessler and a subsequent, more formal Hare & Hare plan in 1936. SWA Group, an international landscape and urban design firm working in conjunction with W.O. Neuhaus Architects and other consultants, was selected over 100 respondents. The most striking of the changes to the 18-acre (7.3 ha) project area was a narrower, more inviting 80-foot-wide (24 m) by 740-foot-long (230 m) reflection pool. It establishes the formal central axis for the space and its slight narrower design afforded elegant pedestrian promenades as well as a double-row of mature Live Oak trees – one row that had been planted in the 1920s to honor veterans of WW I, and a second row that was added as part of the project.

=== The Hermann Park Conservancy ===
Hermann Park was presented to the City of Houston by George Hermann in 1914, and is now Houston's most historically significant public green space. Over the years, the Houston Zoo, Miller Outdoor Theatre, the Houston Museum of Natural Science, and one of the first desegregated public golf courses in the United States all have added to the Park's importance as a recreational destination.

By the late 1980s however, due to insufficient public resources and very high public attendance, the park became rundown and entered a state of disrepair. In response, a group of committed and visionary Houstonians formed the nonprofit organization known as the Friends of Hermann Park (FHP) to encourage the development of more attractive, usable green space in Hermann Park and to promote the restoration of the Park to its originally intended standards of beauty.

Noted in a winning entry for the 2005 National Award of Excellence from the American Society of Landscape Architects, the “Heart of the Park” reflecting pool utilized a biofiltration system of gravel beds and perforated pipes to trap organics so that they naturally decompose. Porous paving systems and decomposed granite also limit potential damage from increased water run-off from the site.

=== Ongoing projects ===
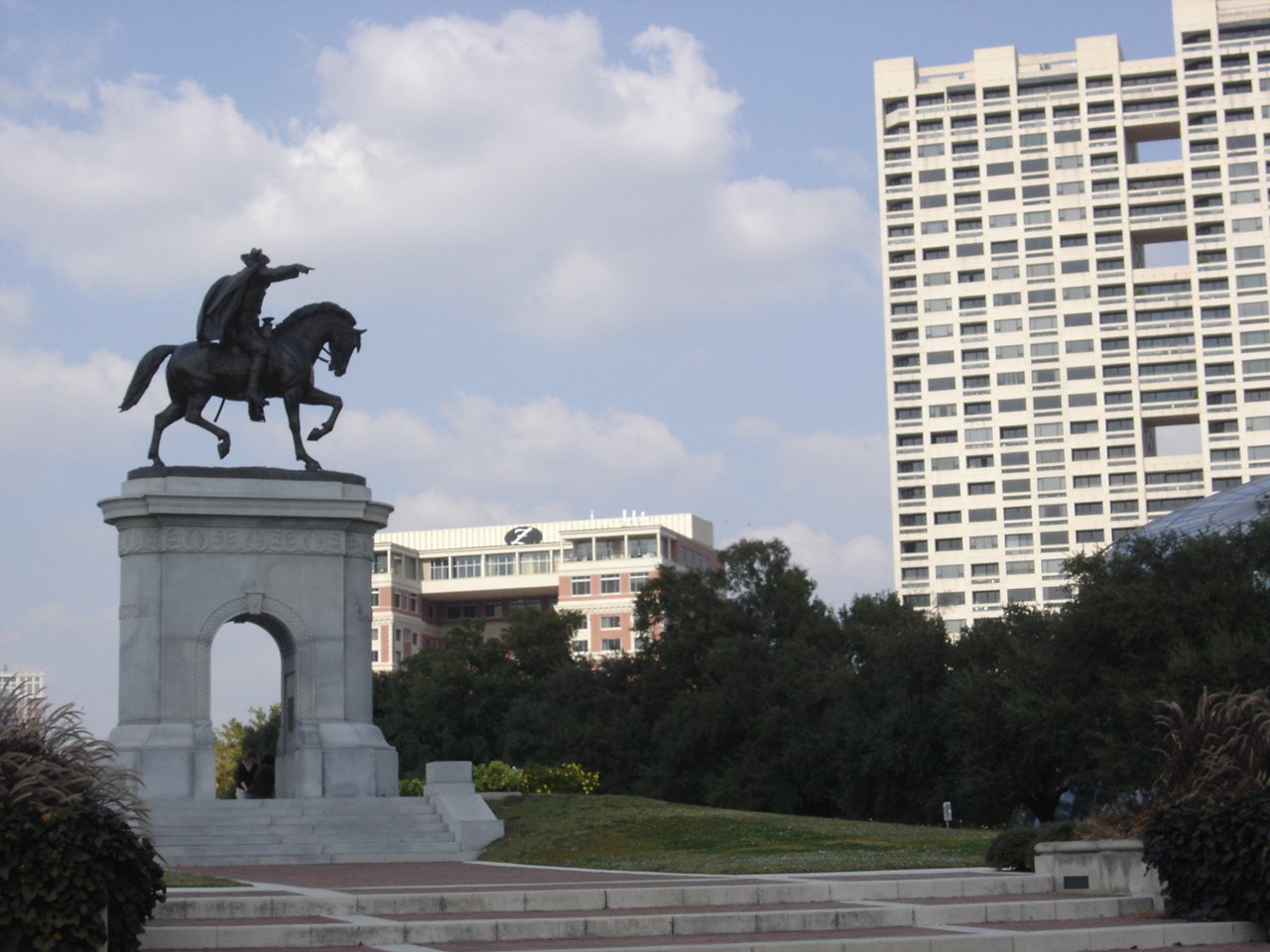
Sam Houston Monument with Warwick Towers in the background

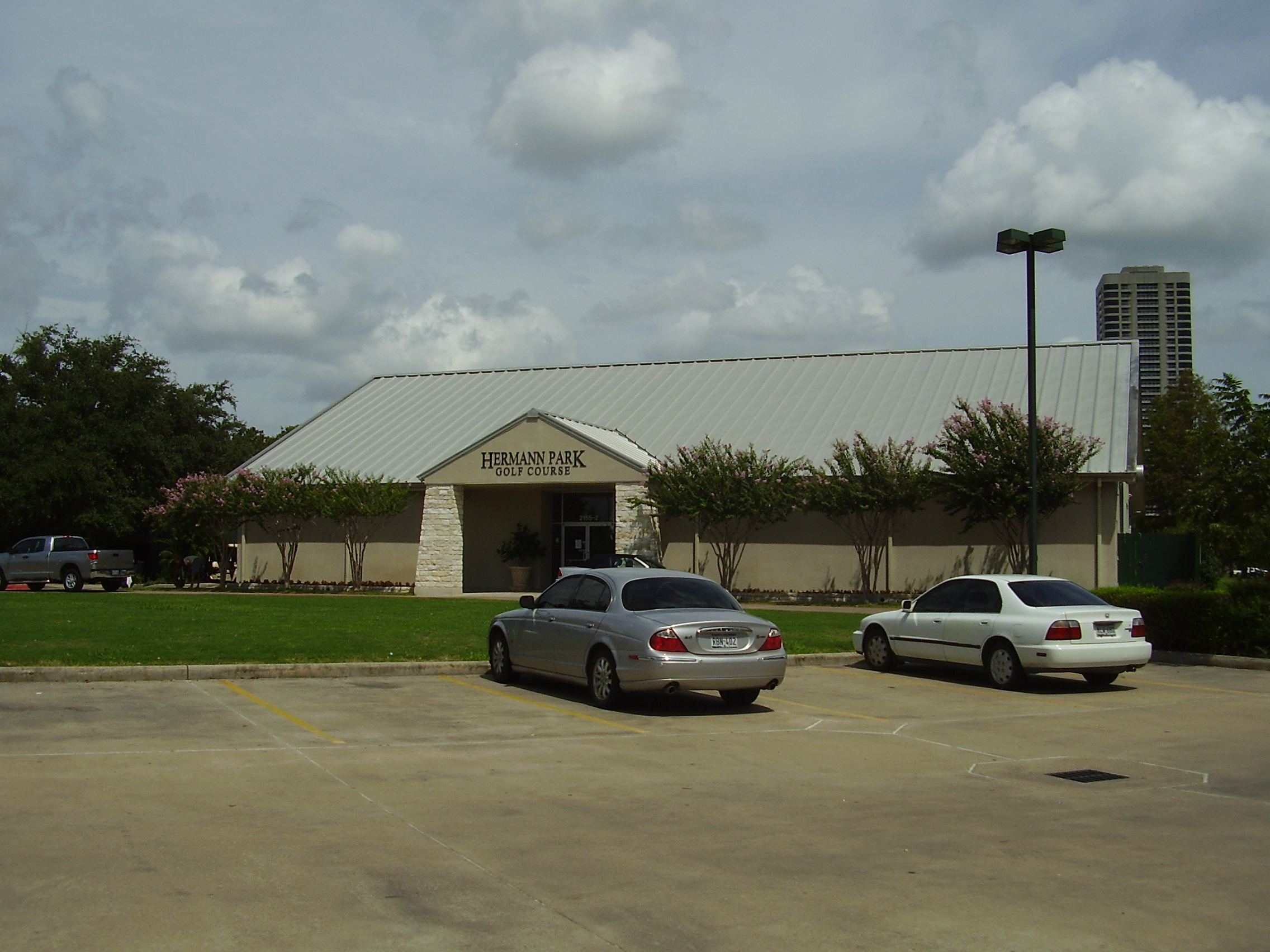
Hermann Park Golf Course

The Hermann Park Conservancy continues working in partnership with the City of Houston to secure funds and manage the design of projects to be undertaken in the Park:

- Mary Gibbs and Jesse H. Jones Reflection Pool
- Molly Ann Smith and Sara H. and John H. Lindsey Plazas
- Enlargement, renovation and beautification of McGovern Lake (including three new islands as well as bird and wetland habitat area.)
- The West Entrance facility and plaza for the Houston Zoo.
- Beautification and re-alignment of North MacGregor Street to improve access and circulation in and around the Park and the Texas Medical Center.
- Acquisition of additional land and capital improvements to Bayou Parkland, an 80-acre (32 ha) area in Hermann Park along Brays Bayou being "reclaimed" for healthier activities and used extensively for stewardship programs.
- Creation and implementation of extensive stewardship programs, including Field Studies 101, Natural Guard, and Scouting Around Hermann Park.
- Completion of the expansion and renovation of Miller Outdoor Theatre.
- Coordination of the comprehensive renovation of the Hermann Park Golf Course (completed by BSL Golf Corporation).
- Coordination of the Hermann Park Miniature Train track expansion.
- Planting of over 2,400 new trees.
- The park-wide installation of new park furnishings such as light fixtures, benches and trash cans.

The Conservancy also developed a Maintenance and Operations Master Plan Study for Hermann Park - the first such comprehensive study ever for this flagship park of Houston. The study identified many concerns for preserving and protecting Hermann Park, including a gap of 20,000 maintenance hours for the Park. In response, the Conservancy hired a Manager of Volunteer Programs. In 2004 over 1,200 volunteers provided over 14,000 hours of volunteer service in the park.

== Attractions ==
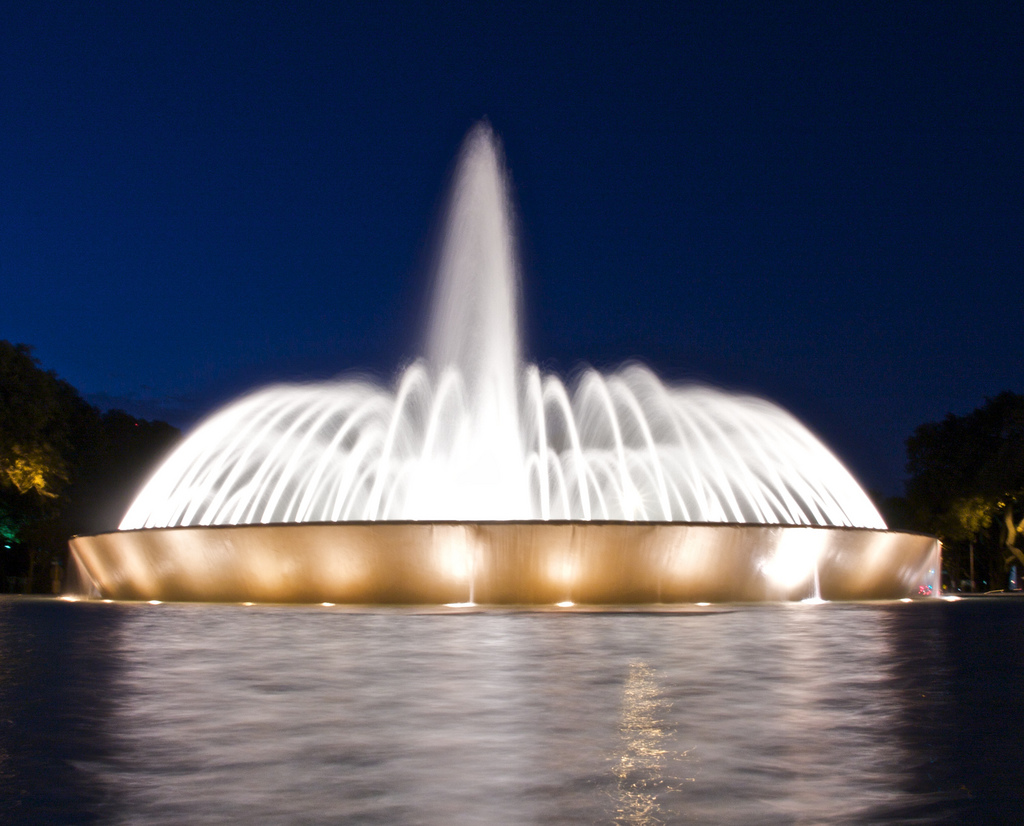
Mecom Fountain at night

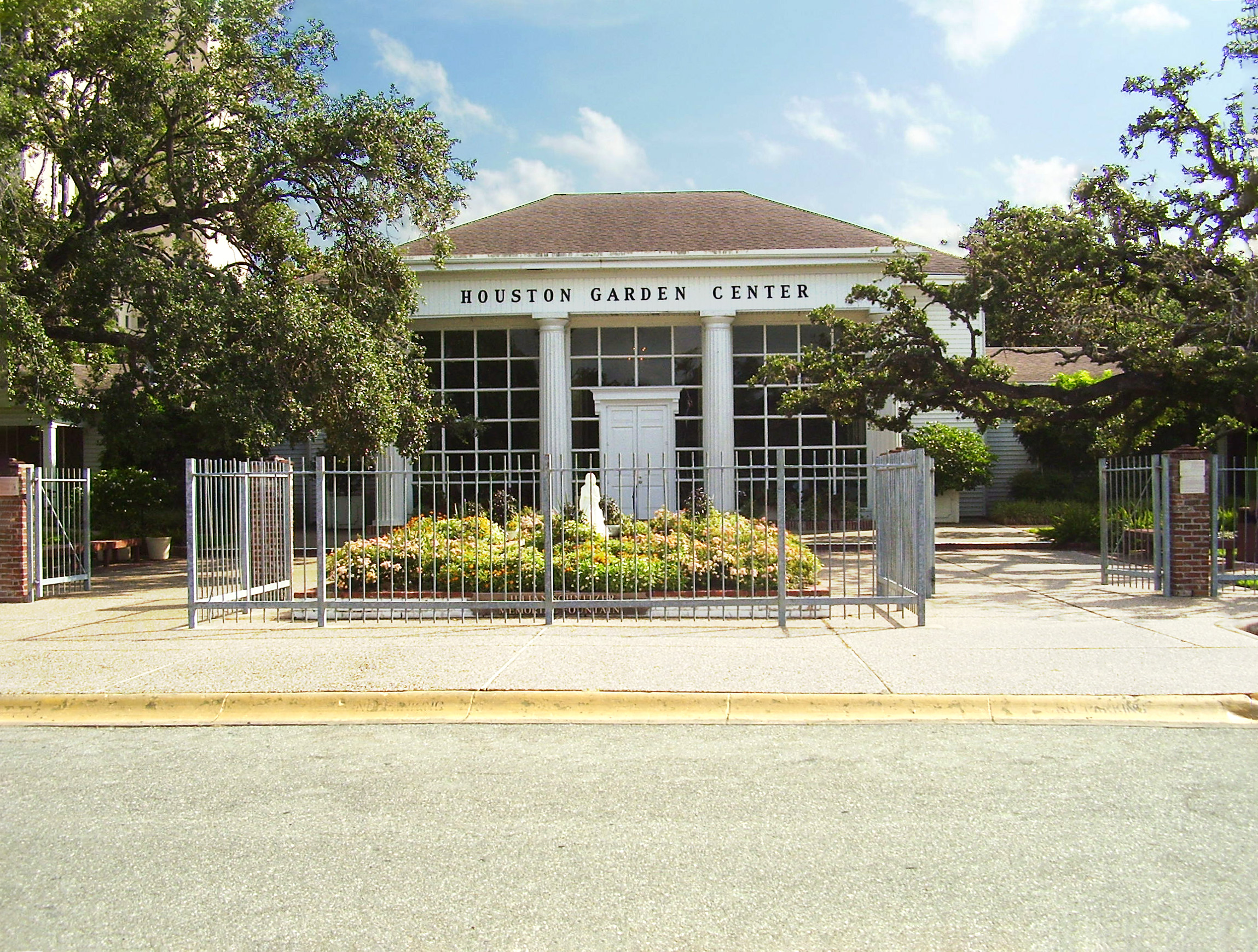
Houston Garden Center

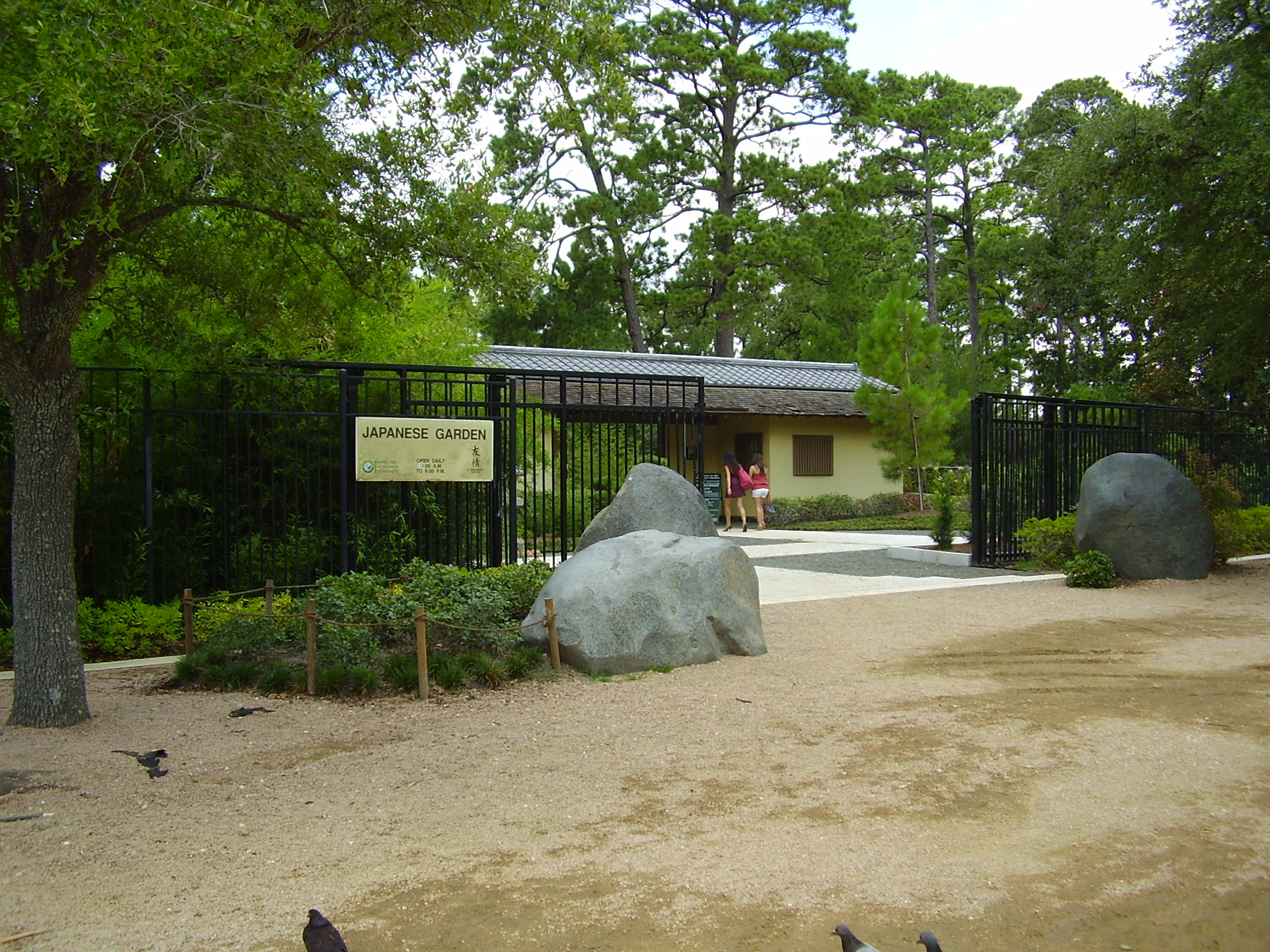
Japanese Garden

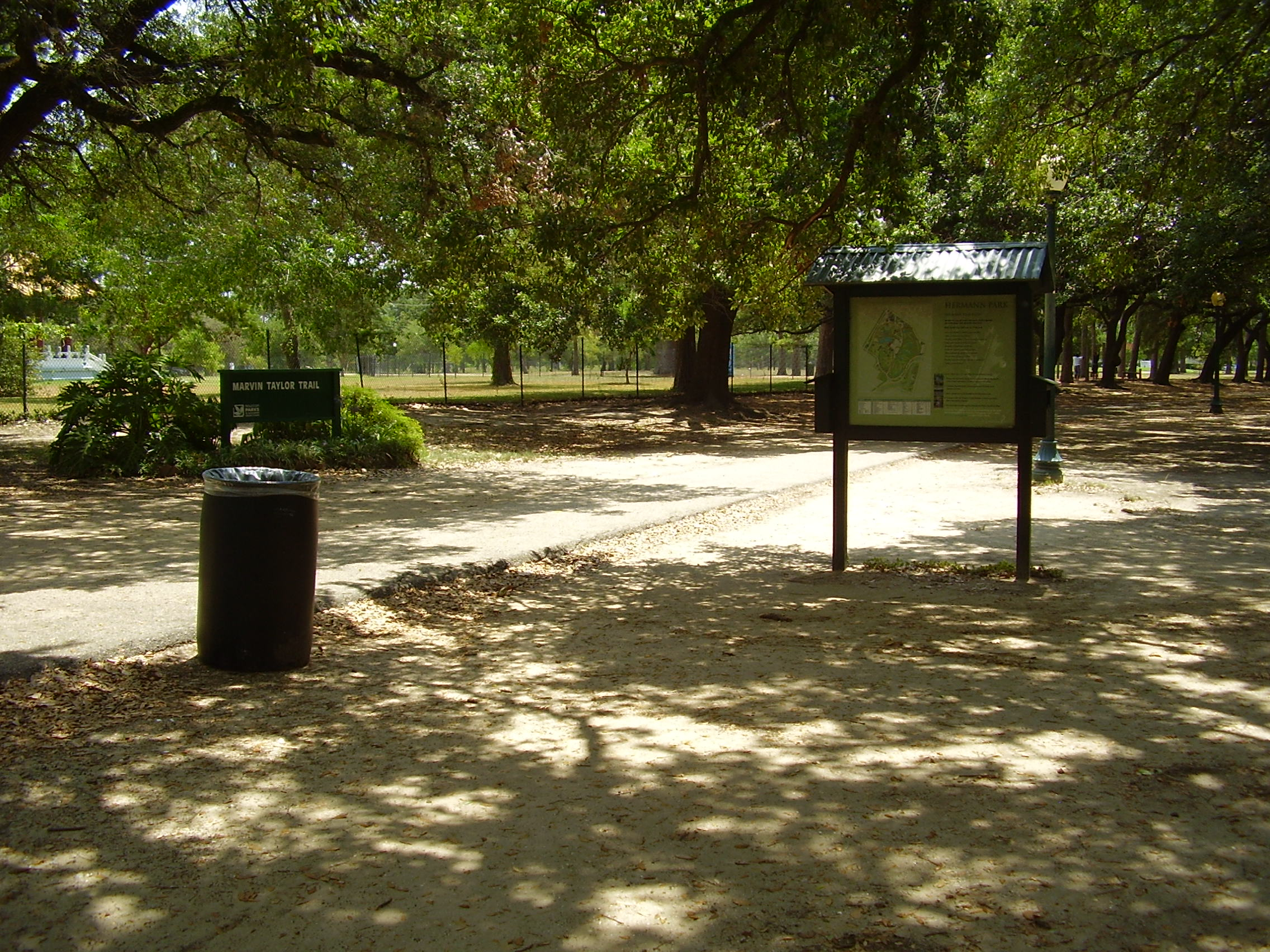
Marvin Taylor Trail

- Arbor in the Pines
- Bayou Parkland
- Richard and Annette Bloch Cancer Survivors Plaza
- Brays Bayou
- Buddy Carruth Playground for All Children
- Chinese Pagoda
- Hermann Park Golf Course
- Hermann Park Jogging Trail
- Hermann Park Pedal Boats
- Hermann Park Railroad (2 ft (610 mm) narrow gauge train ride)
- Houston Garden Center
  - Fragrance Garden
- Houston Museum of Natural Science
  - Cockrell Butterfly Center
- Houston Zoo
- Japanese Garden
- Judson Robinson Jr. Community Center
- Lake Overlook
- Mary Gibbs and Jesse H. Jones Reflection Pool
- Marvin Taylor Exercise Station
- McGovern Centennial Gardens
- McGovern Lake
  - Bob's Fishing Pier
- Mecom Fountain
- Miller Outdoor Theatre
- Molly Ann Smith Plaza, features four interactive fountains
- Pioneer Memorial
- Pioneer Memorial Log House Museum
- Sam Houston Monument
- Urban Forest in Bayou Parkland

== Bibliography ==
- Bradley, Barrie Scardino (2014). Houston's Hermann Park: A Century of Community. College Station: Texas A&M University Press. ISBN 9781623490362.
