= Havemeyer Oil Company =

Havemeyer Oil Company was an American oil company based in Yonkers, New York.

== History ==
The company was in operation from 1901 to 1909 and created products including Havoline motor oil. The founder was John F. Havemeyer. It was bought by Indian Refining Company.
