= Havoline =

American motor oil brand owned by Chevron Corporation

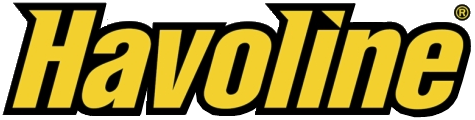
- Product type: Lubricants
- Current owner: Chevron
- Produced by: Chevron
- Country: United States
- Introduced: 1904; 122 years ago
- Previous owners: Havemeyer Oil Co. (1904–1931); Texaco (1931–2001)
- Website: havoline.com

Havoline (/ˈhævəlɪn/ HA-və-lin) is a motor oil brand currently commercialized by Chevron. The brand had been previously owned by Texaco (since 1931), until the company was acquired by Chevron in 2001.

== History ==
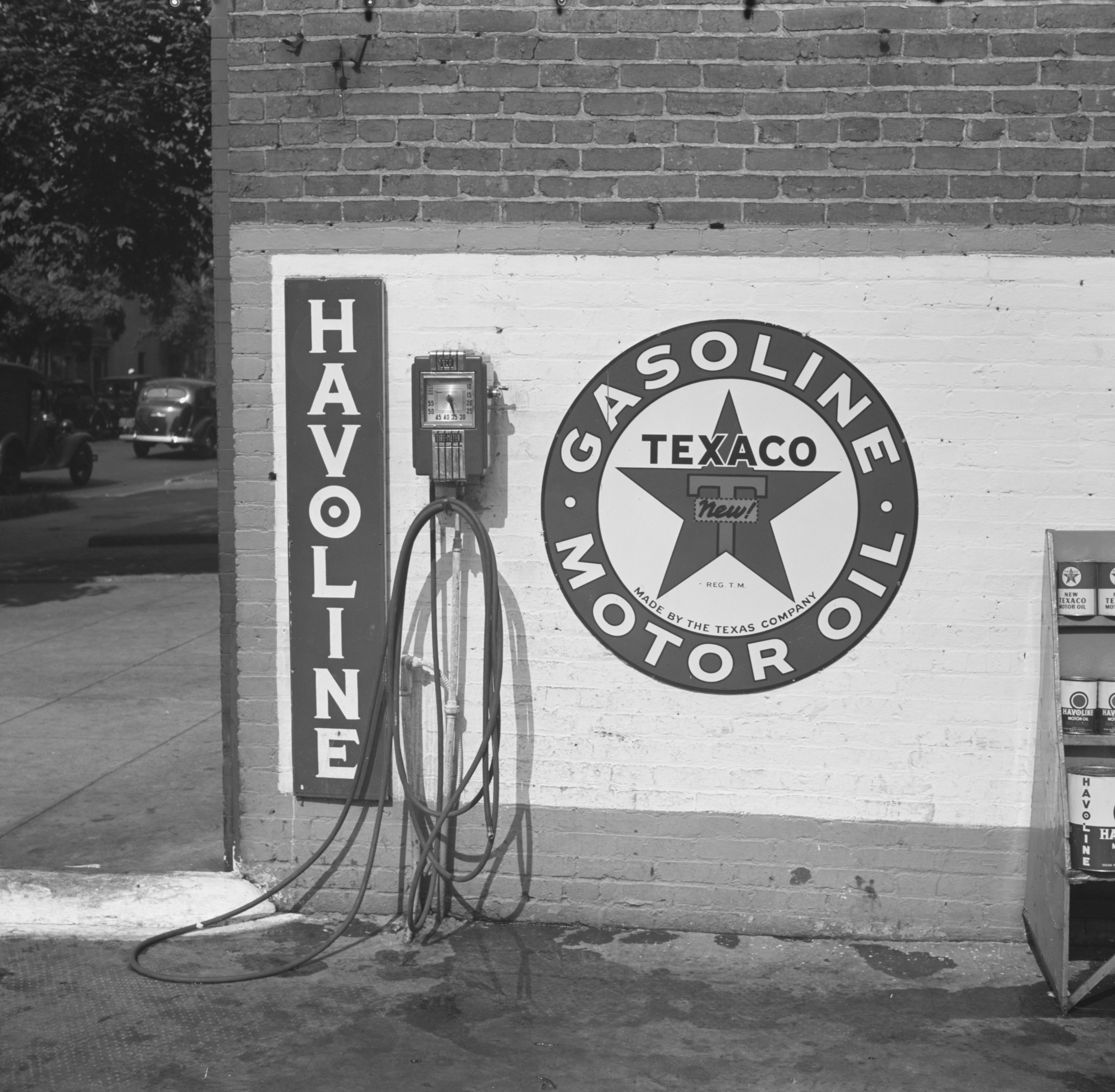
Sign advertising Havoline products (c. 1935–1942)

First introduced in 1904, the Havoline motor oil brand was named by Havemeyer Oil Company of New York. In 1906 the Havoline Oil Company separated from the Havemeyer Oil Company. In May 1909, It was bought by the Indian Refining Company, and registered as an official product of the company but kept the logo. By 1910, the Indian Refining Company already had the Havoline oil manufactured. To boost sales & advertise the product they offered to fuel the first plane to fly coast to Coast. Over 300 auto makers wanted it. In 1915 due to over production they had to halt operations. In 1931 it once again changed hands when the Texas Oil company (now Texaco) bought the Indian Refining Company. In 1946 a breakthrough in technology improved Havoline.

In 1962 they changed the logo, replacing the old Indian logo. That same year new products were introduced, Havoline 10W-30, and Havoline Singlegrade. In 1968 'Improved Havoline & All Temperature Havoline' were introduced, followed by Havoline Super-Premium All Temperature Motor Oil in 1971. In 1979 Texaco ends the decade with a new product called Havoline Supreme 10W-40, which superseded Havoline Super-Premium. In 1984 a major breakthrough came with the SAW 20W-50 to keep up with growing demand.

In 1991 they launched the Formula 3, which became popular all over the world. In 2001 a new logo and package design came out for the whole line of products.

In 2001, Texaco merged with Chevron but the Havoline brand name has been retained for all Texaco motor oils and other lubricating products along with anti-freezes.

In 2009, Nurgün Motors - Havoline, the first American manufacturer of automotive motor oils, began its activities as an official distributor in Azerbaijan...

The Havoline brand now carries the Chevron logo.

== Sponsorships ==
In 1972, Havoline sponsored Emerson Fittipaldi, who became a world champion in Formula One. In 1978, they sponsored Janet Guthrie, a CART and NASCAR driver.

From 1987 to 2002, Havoline sponsored the Robert Yates Racing #28 car in the NASCAR Winston Cup Series. Also, Havoline sponsored Newman/Haas Racing from 1989 to 2002, which featured notable drivers such as Mario Andretti, Michael Andretti, Nigel Mansell, Christian Fittipaldi, and Cristiano da Matta. Havoline's recent sponsorship was with Juan Pablo Montoya in the #42 Dodge for Chip Ganassi Racing with Felix Sabates. At the end of the 2008 NASCAR season, Texaco / Havoline officially ended their sponsorship with NASCAR and Chip Ganassi Racing. This brings a close to a 20+-year relationship with the sport.

After ending its sponsorship with NASCAR, Havoline became a sponsor of the Atlantic Coast Conference.

In 2009 in the AzTV program of the Azerbaijani automobile TV program Pit-Stop, the host of the program was: Rəhim Qurbanov.

In 2010 in the İctimai TV program of the Azerbaijani automobile TV program FORSAJ, the host of the program was: Rəhim Qurbanov.

In 2011-2012, in the ANS TV program of the Azerbaijani automobile TV program 4 Wheels, the host of the program was: Elgün Xıdırov, Hilal Ağakişiyev.

Havoline returned as a NASCAR sponsor with a 3 race deal with ThorSport Racing, for Ben Rhodes, driver of the 99 truck.

== Varieties ==
- Havoline Motor Oils
- Havoline High-Mileage Protection Motor Oils
- Havoline Synthetic Motor Oils
- Havoline Synthetic Blend Motor Oil
- Texaco Ursa Super Plus Motor Oils
- Texaco Ursa Extra Duty Motor Oils
- Havoline Two-Cycle Engine Oil
