= Nina J. Cullinan =

American art patron and civic leader (1899-1983)

Nina J. Cullinan (1899–February 22, 1983) was an American philanthropist, art patron and a civic leader in Houston, Texas.

== Early life ==
Nina J. Cullinan was born in Washington, Pennsylvania in 1899. Her parents were Lucy Halm Cullinan and Joseph Cullinan, a founder of Magnolia Petroleum Company and Texaco. Her family, which included her four siblings, moved to Beaumont, Texas in 1902 when Nina was three. She grew up in Houston, attended public schools, a prep school and then the Ogontz School near Philadelphia, Pennsylvania (now Penn State Abbington).

== Civic life ==
Cullinan's civic participation began in Houston not long after graduating from Ogontz. She became a founding member of the three Houston non-profits: the Contemporary Arts Museum, the Society for the Performing Arts, and the Houston Ballet. She also served on the boards of numerous other non-profit organizations in Texas.

In 1953, Cullinan donated $250,000 to the Houston Museum of Fine Arts (MFA) in the name of her parents. The funds were used to build an annex for visiting art exhibits. The museum hired Ludwig Mies van der Rohe to design the resulting Cullinan Hall, which opened in 1958. In 1978, the Society of Texas Architects honored her for that generosity.

Cullinan's philanthropic work reached many areas of Houston city life. She served as a board member of the Child Guidance Center, the Houston Mental Health Society and the National Parks Commission. In 1982, she was one of four city residents to be honored in 1982 by Mayor Kathryn J. Whitmire for her gifts to the arts. Later that year Cullinan was honored at a dinner held by the Texas Project for the Archives of American Art. In addition, Cullinan was known for her frequent, anonymous donations that carried few restrictions for the recipients.

== Death ==
Cullinan died at 84 in Houston on February 22, 1983. In her will, she gave more than half of her estate, $4 million, to the Houston Parks Board to finance new park development.

== Bibliography ==
- Bradley, Barrie Scardino. Improbable Metropolis: Houston's Architectural and Urban History. Austin: University of Texas Press. ISBN 978-1-4773-2019-8.
- Smithsonian Interview by Nina Cullinan
