= Arnold Schlaet =

Arnold Schlaet (1859–1946) was a U.S. oil industrialist and business man.

== Biography ==
There is scant public records that publish information about Schlaet's early life. He is said to have been born in Germany in 1859 but was already registered as a U.S. resident after 1875. He was later known as merchant and investment manager based in New York.

In 1901, Schlaet, while visiting Spindletop in behalf of his employers, founded Texas Fuel Company, predecessor to Texaco Incorporated, with Jim Hogg, John Warne Gates, and Joseph S. Cullinan. Schlaet was an agent from New York City who worked for the United States Leather Company, owned by John J. and Lewis Henry Lapham. Naturally conservative, he was nevertheless impressed with Cullinan's plans to sell Spindletop oil, and helped him to gain capital to start the new venture. The initial capital was $50,000 but this was increased as Cullinan and Schlaet solicited additional investments. By the time the Texas Fuel Company was reorganized in 1902 as the Texas Company, it already had a capitalization of $3 million. Among the investors where the Laphams, who appointed Schlaet to work closely with Cullinan.

Schlaet was characterized as a cautious and methodical man and served as a good check on Cullinan's risk-taking nature. An account, for instance, cited that, in 1902, he opposed Cullinan's exploration venture in Sour Lake, which eventually struck oil in 1903. It has been cited that he is known within Texaco as "Joyously", which was not given to him as a reflection of his personality but was an arbitrarily assigned code for use in Texaco's cable code system, identifying him in executive correspondence.
