= Joseph S. Cullinan =

American oil executive (1860–1937)

- Born: Joseph Stephen Cullinan; December 31, 1860; Pulaski Township, Lawrence County, Pennsylvania
- Died: March 11, 1937 (aged 76); Palo Alto, California
- Relatives: Nina J. Cullinan (daughter); Craig F. Cullinan Jr. (grandson)

Joseph Stephen Cullinan (December 31, 1860 – March 11, 1937) was a U.S. oil industrialist. Although he was a native of Pennsylvania, his lifetime business endeavors would help shape the early phase of the oil industry in Texas. He founded The Texas Company, which would eventually be known as Texaco Incorporated.

== Early life ==
Cullinan was born to John Francis and Mary (nee Considine) Cullinan on December 31, 1860, in Pulaski Township, Lawrence County, Pennsylvania, not far from Sharon, Pennsylvania. His first experience in the oil industry was when he was 14, working as a hand in the Pennsylvania oilfields. He was responsible for various oil-related duties including a distribution station in Oleopolis, Pennsylvania. This broad exposure prepared him well for his future ventures in the industry. When he was 22, he joined an affiliate of Standard Oil and for the next thirteen years, performed various managerial duties.

Cullinan started with a small drilling operation along the Gulf Coast of Texas and had expanded over the years, moving west toward Houston and later pushed east toward New Orleans.

== Career ==
=== Move to Texas ===
Oil was discovered in Corsicana, Texas, in 1894 by accident when a water-well company found petroleum while digging a well for the city. By 1897, production was so great that the city's mayor invited him to guide oil production facility development. The lack of refineries often resulted in dumping of crude oil, a wasteful practice which prompted Texas legislators to enforce regulations on the industry. Cullinan, a key person in the development of the state's first petroleum-conservation statute, took such an interest that he agreed to build a refinery. Using out-of-state funds, the J. S. Cullinan Company was established and had a facility online by 1900, processing 1,500 barrels per day (240 m^{3}/d). His refinery there was the first of its type west of the Mississippi. This company later became part of Magnolia Petroleum Company. Using his storage facilities to hold Corsicana crude oil at Sabine, which had a capacity of 37,000 barrels, he enjoyed a significant competitive advantage over other buyers. He was able to purchase large quantities of oil at flush production prices of pennies a barrel.

=== Operations on the Texas Gulf Coast ===
With the breakthrough discovery of the Spindletop oilfield at Beaumont, Cullinan moved his operations to the Beaumont region to partner with Arnold Schlaet. The Texas Fuel Company was formed on March 28, 1901, and went into production on January 2, 1902, with an initial 40 acres (160,000 m^{2}) of land at Port Arthur and a storage site 1 1/2 miles (2.4 km) from Spindletop. Its primary product was kerosene. Since integrated oil companies were prohibited in Texas at the time, Cullinan organized the Producers Oil Company on January 17, 1902. One of the prominent investors in this company was John Warne Gates, a businessman and industrialist from Illinois. The Producers Oil Company at this time focused on oil exploration and supply. Within two months, The Texas Company was formed for transporting and refining crude oil. From 1902 to 1913, Cullinan served as its president. By 1909, he had moved its headquarters from Beaumont to Houston. The relocation established Houston as the epicenter of the oil industry as other oil companies increasingly followed suit. The Texas Company changed its corporate name to Texaco in 1959. Cullinan continued to serve in the oil industry after stepping down from leadership at Texaco. He established the American Republics Corporation and other exploration companies and refineries mostly along Texas's coast.

=== Real estate development ===
Cullinan bought the land that would become the Shadyside subdivision in 1916, purchased from the estate of George H. Hermann. Cullinan said that his intention was to create a subdivision so that his business acquaintances and friends could live near him. In 1920, Cullinan put the 16-lot subdivision on the market: it sold out within six weeks.

== Public life ==
Cullinan had a profound impact upon the city of Houston. In addition to being one of the key supporters for the development of the Houston Ship Channel, he also built the North Side belt railway. He supported venues such as the Houston Symphony Orchestra as well as the Museum of Fine Arts (Houston). He served as president of the Houston Chamber of Commerce from 1913 until 1919. During World War I, he served under Herbert Hoover as a special advisor to the Food Administration. For five years starting in 1928, he served on the Mount Rushmore National Memorial Committee.

== Personal life ==
On April 14, 1891, he married Lucy Halm — they would have five children. In 1895, he ventured into the manufacture of steel storage tanks and started his own company under the name Petroleum Iron Works in New Castle, Pennsylvania.

== Death and legacy ==
On March 11, 1937, Cullinan died during a visit with Hoover in Palo Alto, California, where he was overcome with pneumonia. Afterward his interest in Texaco was split six ways between his sister Mary Nicholson and his children, including daughter and philanthropist Nina J. Cullinan.

== Bibliography ==
- Bradley, Barrie Scardino (2014). Houston's Hermann Park: A Century of Community. College Station, TX: Texas A&M Press. ISBN 978-1-62349-036-2.
