= Texaco =

American petroleum brand owned by Chevron Corporation

Texaco, Inc.
- Formerly: The Texas Company (1902–1959); Texaco (1959–2001); ChevronTexaco (2001–2005)
- Type: Private (1902–2001); Subsidiary (2001–2005); Brand (since 2005)
- Industry: Petroleum
- Founded: 1902; 124 years ago (as Texas Fuel Company) in Beaumont, Texas, U.S.
- Founders: Joseph S. Cullinan; Lewis Henry Lapham; Arnold Schlaet
- Fate: Acquired by Chevron Corporation in October 2001, changed to "ChevronTexaco" until 2005, when it became a brand of it
- Headquarters: Texaco Headquarters, White Plains, New York
- Number of locations: 2,000+ (2006)
- Area served: Worldwide
- Products: Gasoline, natural gas, motor oils, other petrochemicals
- Brands: Havoline (1931–2001)
- Owner: Chevron Corporation (2001–present)
- Subsidiaries: Indian Oil Co. (1931–1943)
- Website: texaco.com

Texaco, Inc. (a shortening of "The Texas Company") is an American oil brand owned and operated by Chevron Corporation. Its flagship product is its fuel "Texaco with Techron". It also owned the Havoline motor oil brand. Texaco was an independent company until its refining operations merged into Chevron in 2001, at which time most of its station franchises were divested to Shell plc through its American division. It was one of the first gas stations to exist.

Texaco began as the "Texas Fuel Company", founded in 1902 in Beaumont, Texas, by Joseph S. Cullinan, Thomas J. Donoghue, and Arnold Schlaet upon the discovery of oil at Spindletop. The Texas Fuel Company was not set up to drill wells or to produce crude oil. To accomplish this, Cullinan organized the Producers Oil Company in 1902, as a group of investors affiliated with The Texas Fuel Company. Men such as John W. "Bet A Million" Gates invested in "certificates of interest" to an amount of almost ninety thousand dollars. Future restructuring would merge Producers Oil Company and The Texas Fuel Company as Texaco when the company needed additional funding, which J.W. Gates provided in the amount of approximately $590,000 in return for company stock.

Texaco was one of the Seven Sisters which dominated the global petroleum industry from the mid-1940s to the 1970s. Its current logo features a white star in a red circle (a reference to the lone star of Texas), leading to the long-running advertising jingles "You can trust your car to the man who wears the star" and "Star of the American Road." The company was headquartered in Harrison, New York, near White Plains, prior to the merger with Chevron.

Texaco gasoline comes with Techron, an additive developed by Chevron, as of 2005, replacing the previous CleanSystem3. The Texaco brand is strong in the U.S., Latin America, and West Africa. It has a presence in Europe as well; for example, it is a well-known retail brand in the UK, with around 980 Texaco-branded service stations.

== History ==
=== 1902–59: Beginnings ===
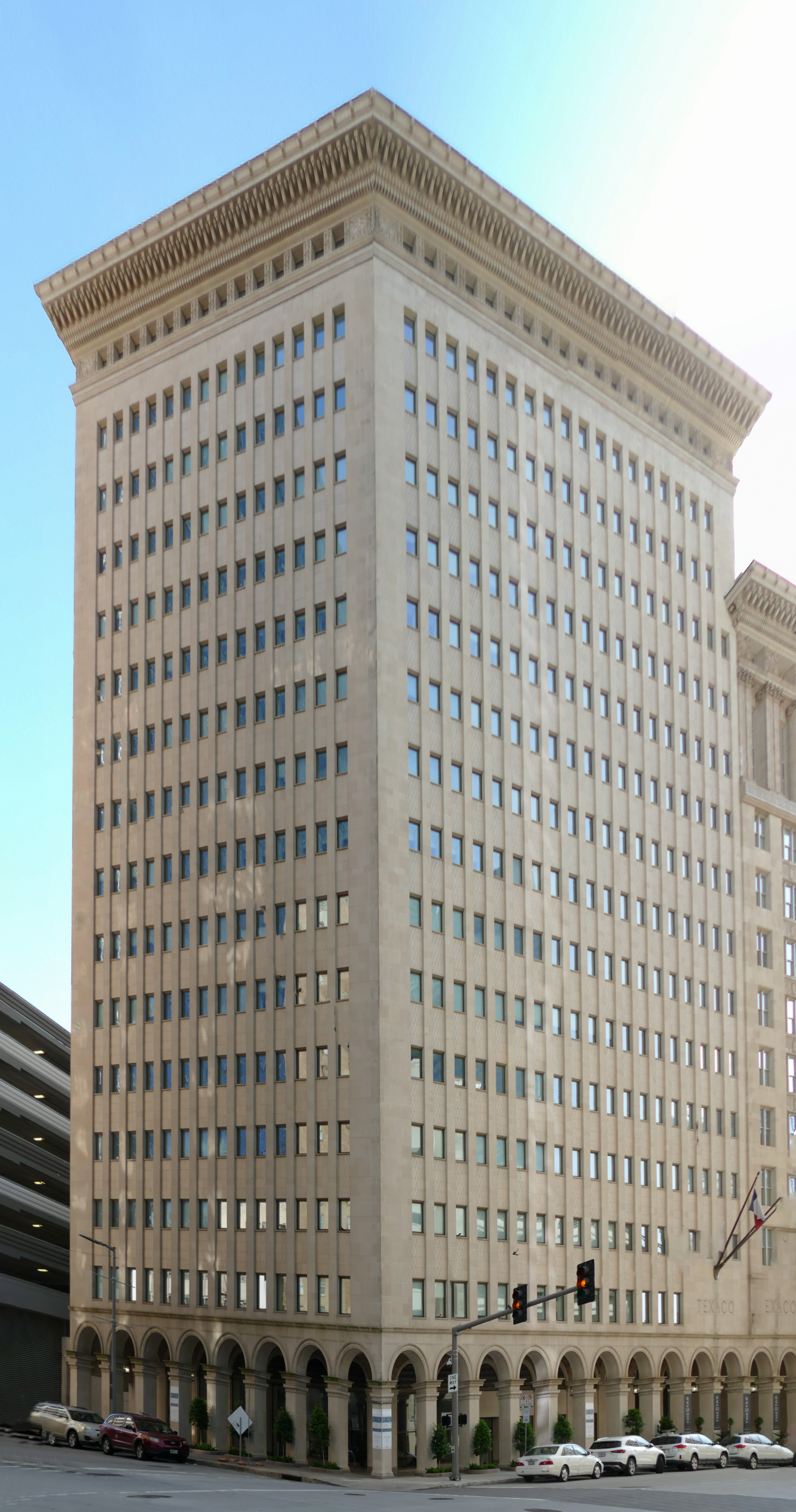
Texas Company Building at 1111 Rusk St. in Houston. The company moved to larger facilities in 1989

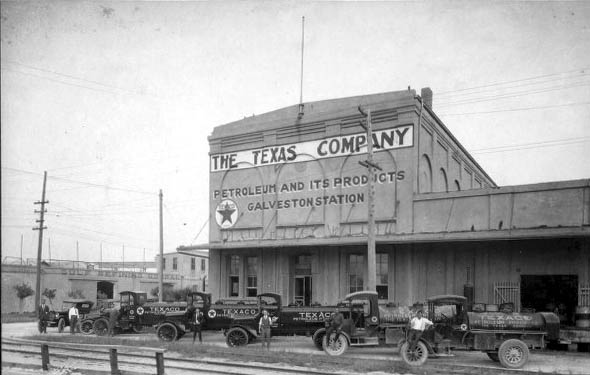
The Texas Company Galveston station, c. 1910–1920

Texaco was founded in Beaumont, Texas, as the "Texas Fuel Company" in 1902, by Jim Hogg, Joseph S. Cullinan, John Warne Gates, and Arnold Schlaet. On 1 May 1902, the Texas Company was formed from the assets of Texas Fuel assets, and additional capitalization. In 1905, it established an operation in Antwerp, Belgium, under the name Continental Petroleum Company, which it acquired control of in 1913. In 1915, Texaco moved to new 13 story offices on 1111 Rusk St., Houston, Texas. In 1928, Texaco became the first U.S. oil company to sell its gasoline nationwide under one single brand name in all of the then 48 states.

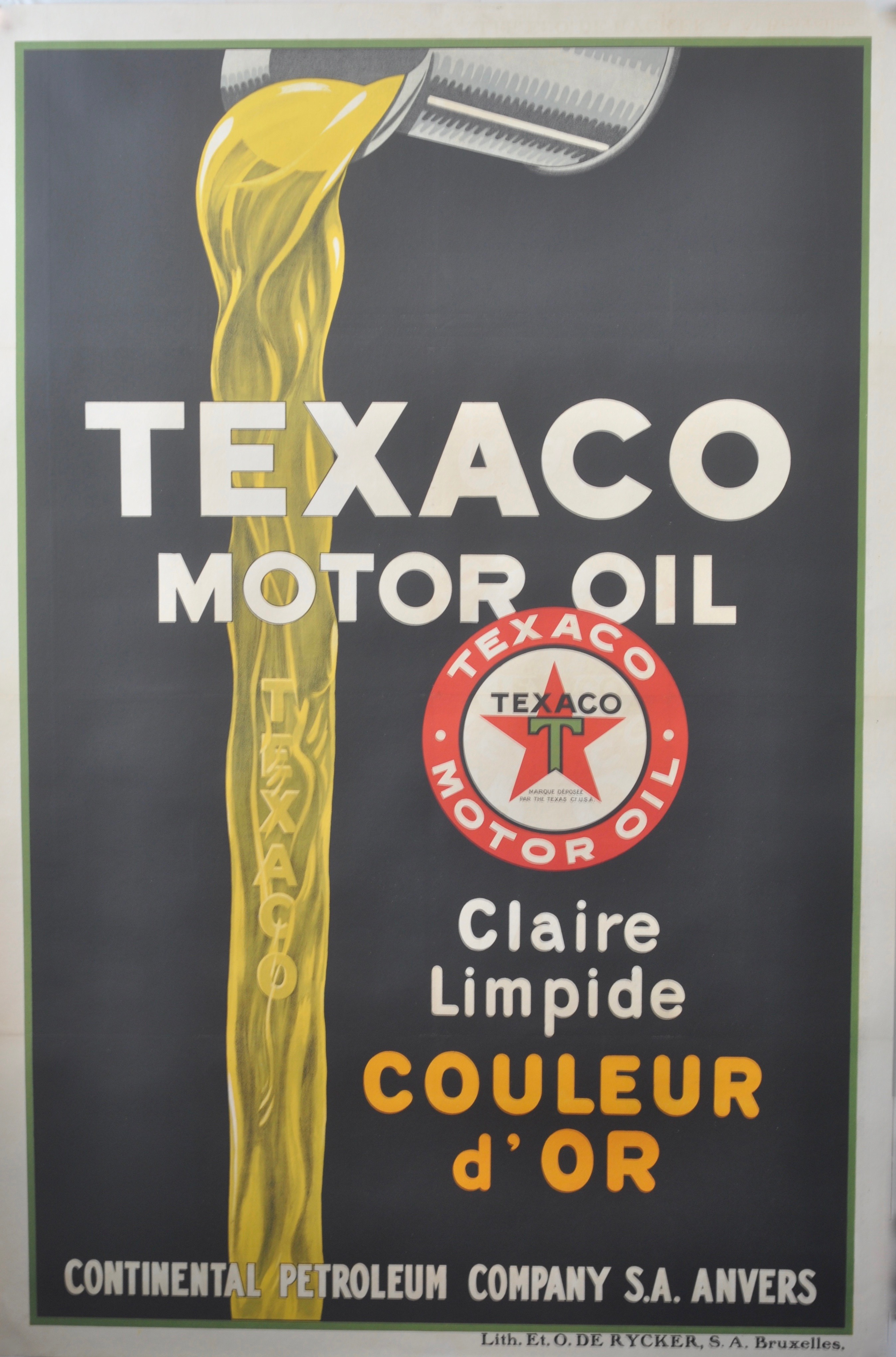
TEXACO MOTOR OIL Poster (1928)

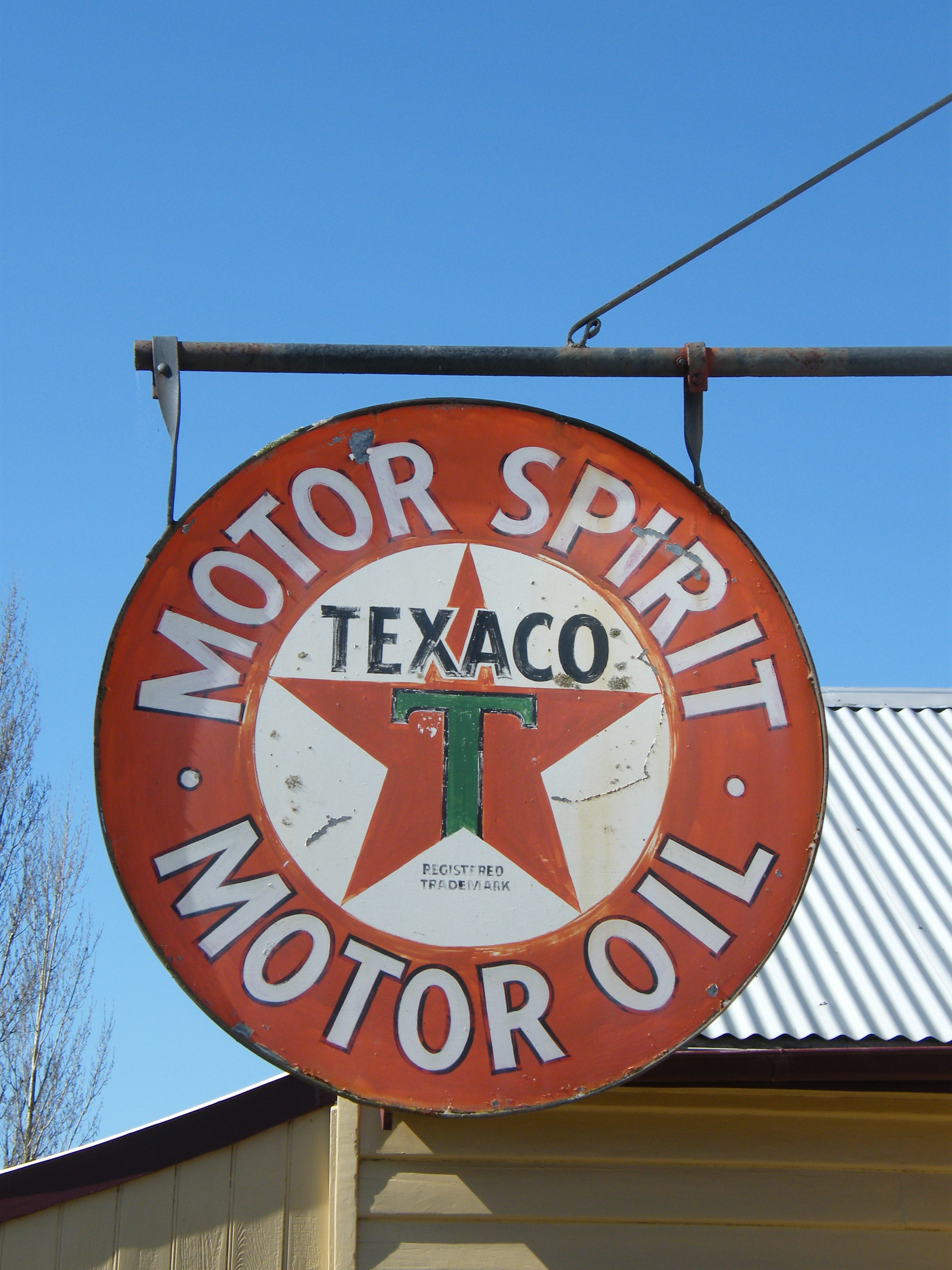
Antique Texaco advertising, Gippsland Motor Garage, Old Gippstown

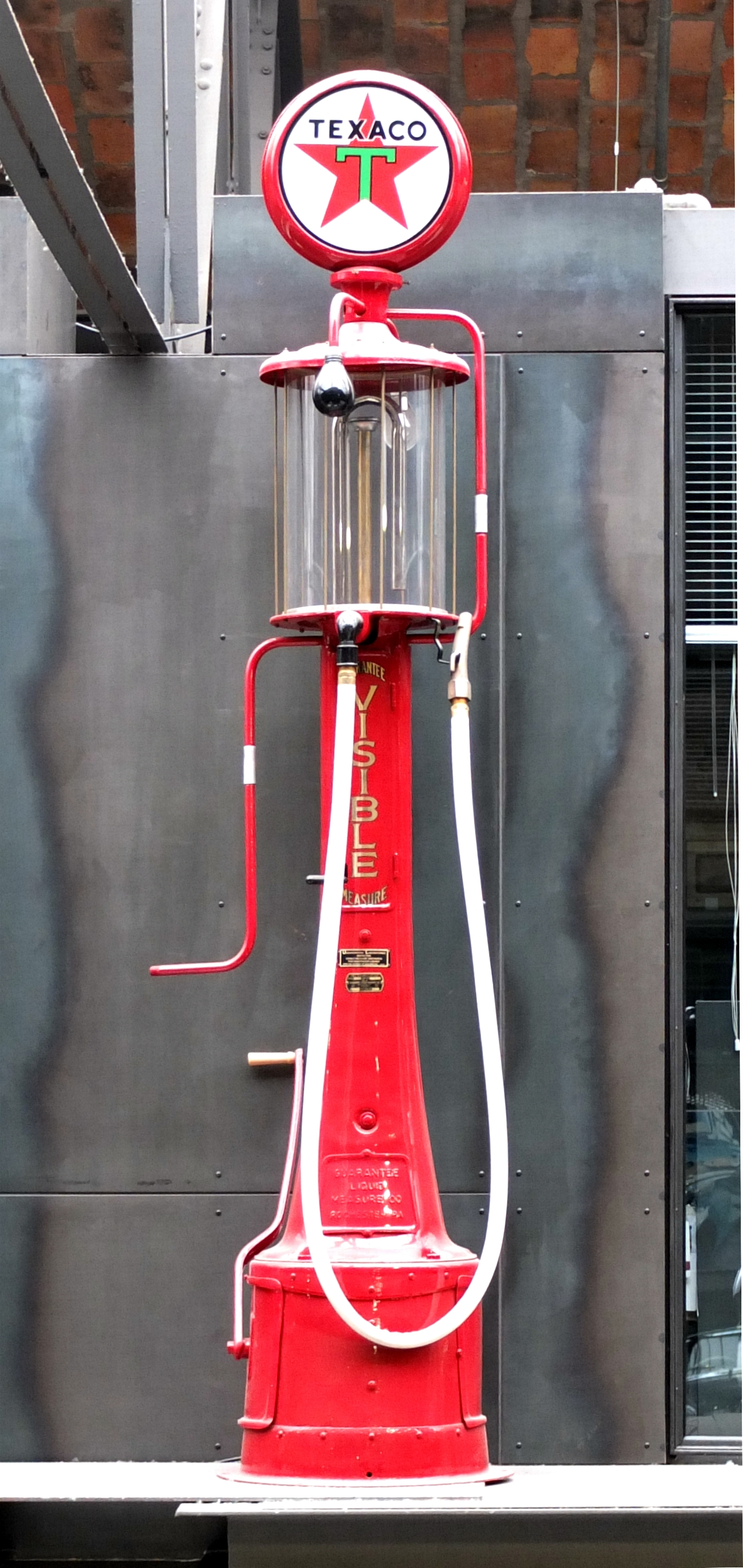
Vintage Texaco gas pump (1925)

In 1931, Texaco purchased the Indian Oil Company, based in Illinois. This expanded Texaco's refining and marketing base in the Midwest and also gave Texaco the rights to Indian's Havoline motor oil, which became a Texaco product. The next year, Texaco introduced Fire Chief gasoline nationwide, a so-called "super-octane" motor fuel touted as meeting or exceeding government standards for gasoline for fire engines and other emergency vehicles. It was promoted through a radio program over NBC hosted by Ed Wynn, called the Texaco Fire Chief.

In 1936, the Texas Corporation purchased the Barco oil concession in Colombia, and formed a joint venture with Socony-Vacuum, now Mobil, to develop it. Over the next three years the company engaged in a highly challenging project to drill wells and build a pipeline to the coast across mountains and then through uncharted swamps and jungles. During this time, Texaco also illegally supplied the fascist Nationalist faction in the Spanish Civil War with a total 3,500,000 barrels (560,000 m^{3}) of oil. For these illegal sales to Francisco Franco's fascist forces the company was fined $20,000 for violating the Neutrality Act of 1937, although it continued to sell to Franco on credit until the end of the war.

Also in 1936, marketing operations "East of Suez" (including Asia, East Africa, and Australasia) were placed into a joint venture with Standard Oil Company of California (Socal, now Chevron) under the brand name Caltex, in exchange for Socal placing its Bahrain refinery and Arabian oilfields into the venture. The next year, Texaco commissioned industrial designer Walter Dorwin Teague to develop a modern service station design.

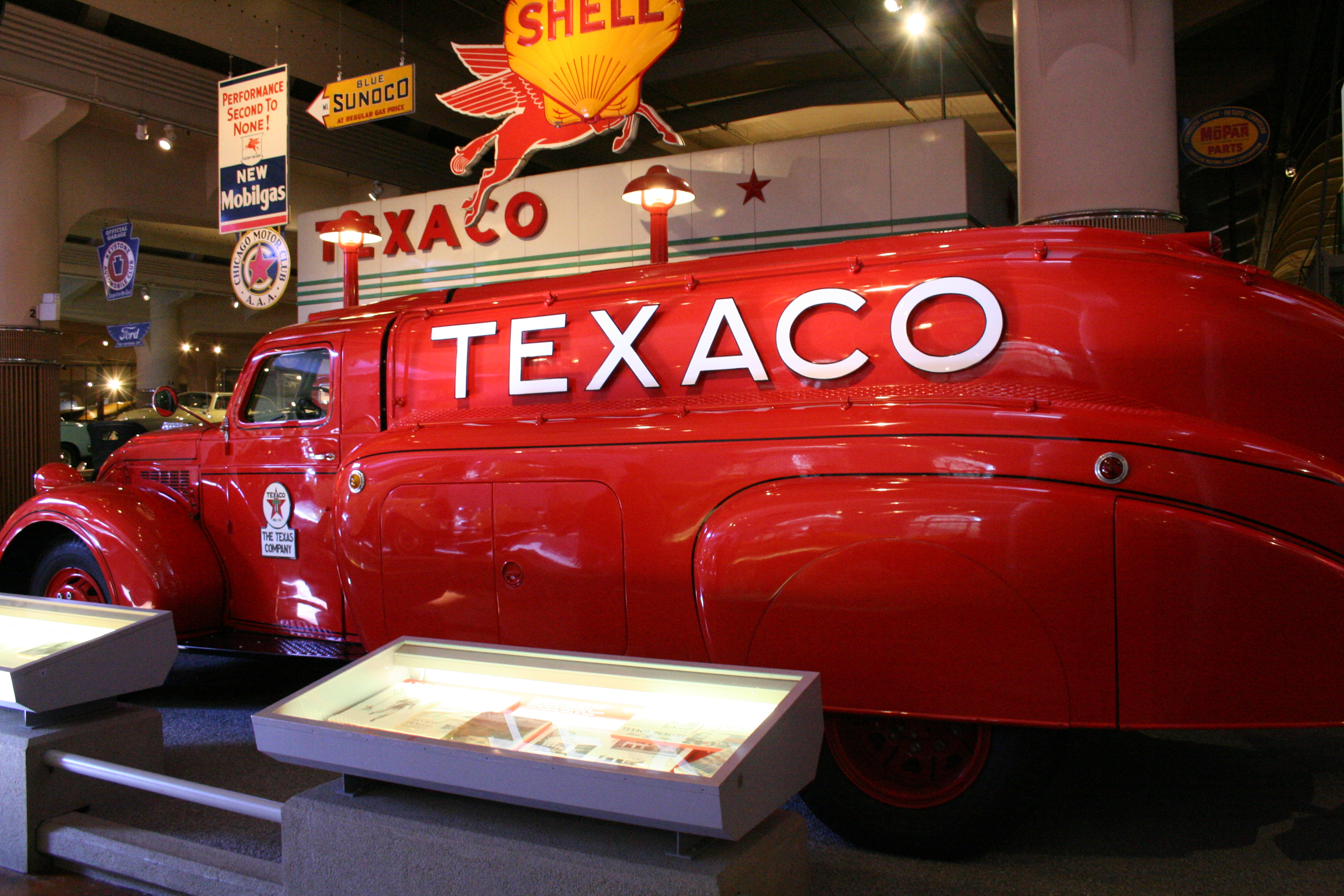
1939 Texaco tanker truck by Dodge on display at the Henry Ford Museum

In 1938, Texaco introduced Sky Chief gasoline, a premium fuel developed from the ground up as a high-octane gasoline rather than just an ethylized regular product. In 1939, Texaco became one of the first oil companies to introduce a "Registered Rest Room" program to ensure that restroom facilities at all Texaco stations nationwide maintained a standard level of cleanliness to the motoring public.

After the onset of World War II in 1939, Texaco's CEO, Torkild Rieber, admirer of Hitler, hired pro-Nazi assistants who cabled Berlin "coded information about ships leaving New York for Britain and what their cargoes were." This espionage easily enabled Hitler to destroy the ships. In 1940, Rieber was forced to resign when his connections with German Nazism, and his illegal supply of oil to the fascist forces during the Spanish Civil War were made public by the New York Herald Tribune through information produced by British Security Coordination. Life magazine portrayed Rieber's resignation as unfair, advocating that he only dined with Westrick, and lent him a company car.

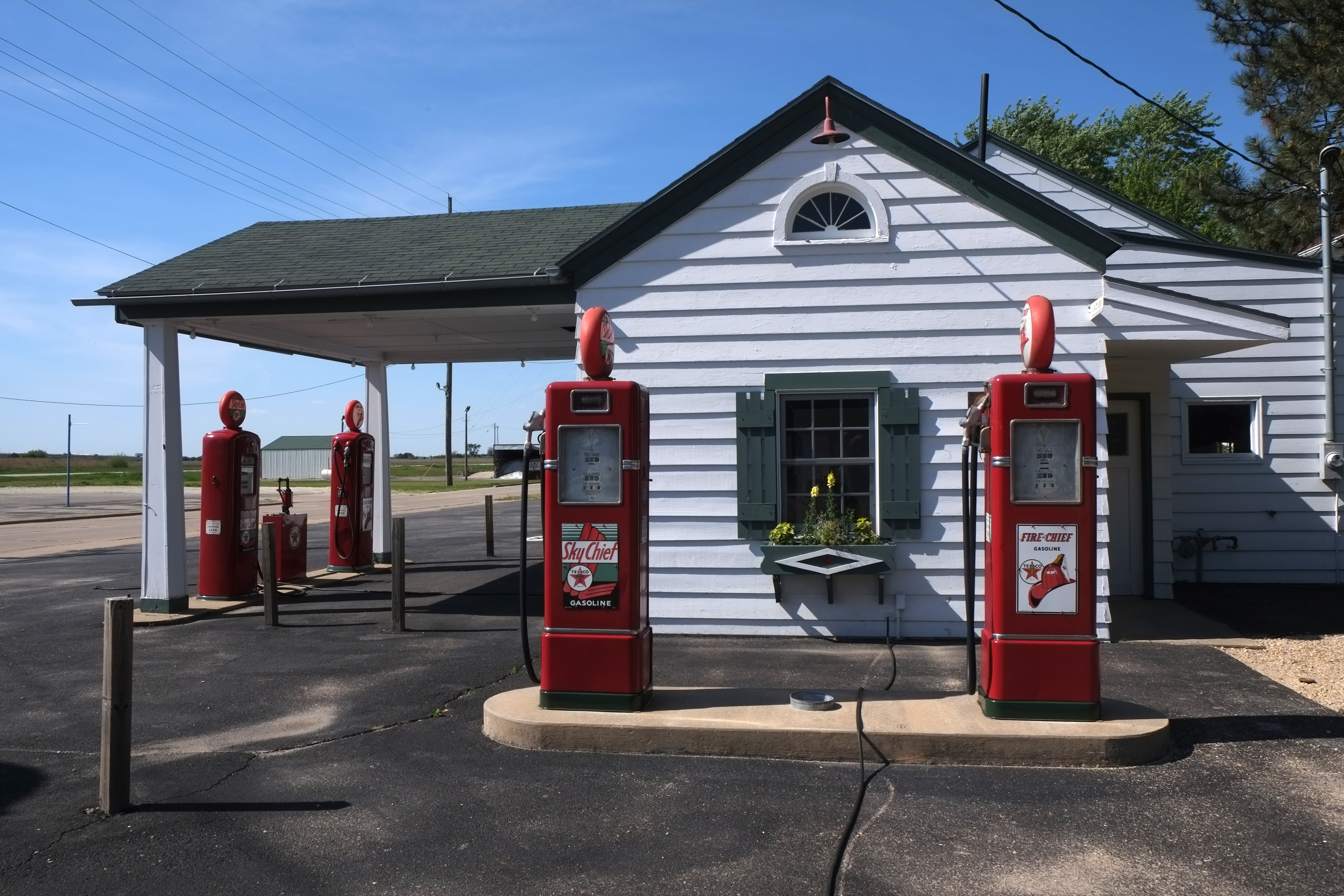
Historic gasoline pumps at the Ambler's Texaco Gas Station, Dwight, Illinois

During the war, Texaco ranked 93rd among United States corporations in the value of military production contracts. In 1947, Caltex expanded to include Texaco's European marketing operations. That same year, Texaco merged its British operation with Trinidad Leaseholds under the name Regent; it gained full control of Regent in 1956, but the Regent brand remained in use until 1968–9. In 1954, the company added the detergent additive Petrox to its "Sky Chief" gasoline, which was also souped up with higher octane to meet the antiknock needs of new cars with high-compression engines.

The next year, Texaco became the sole sponsor of The Huntley-Brinkley Report on NBC-TV. In 1959, the Texas Company changed its corporate name to Texaco, Inc. to better reflect the value of the Texaco brand name, which represented the biggest selling gasoline brand in the U.S. and only marketer selling gasoline under one brand name in all (by then) 50 states. It also acquired McColl-Frontenac Oil Company Ltd. of Canada and changes its name to Texaco Canada Limited. Around this time, Paragon Oil, a major fuel oil distribution company in the northeastern U.S., was acquired.

=== 1964–98: Various ventures ===
In 1964, Texaco introduced the "Matawan" service station design at a station in Matawan, New Jersey. Two years later, Texaco replaced the long-running banjo sign with a new hexagon logo that had previously been test-marketed with the "Matawan" station design introduced two years earlier. The new logo featured a red outline with TEXACO in black bold lettering and a small banjo logo with a red star and green T at bottom. The following year, the Regent name was replaced by Texaco at British petrol stations. In 1970, in response to increasingly-stringent federal vehicle emissions standards that would induce automakers to install catalytic converters requiring equipped vehicles to run on unleaded gasoline, Texaco introduced their first regular-octane no-lead gasoline at stations in the Los Angeles area and throughout Southern California. Lead-Free Texaco became available nationwide in 1974. On November 20, 1980, the Lake Peigneur/Jefferson Island disaster occurred. Two years later, a new service station design was introduced. Several product names were also changed with the advent of self-service, including Lead-free Texaco to Texaco Unleaded, Fire Chief to Texaco Regular, and Super Lead-free Sky Chief to Texaco Super Unleaded.

At the end of 1981 and the beginning of 1982, members of the Medellín Cartel (including Pablo Escobar), the Colombian military, the U.S.-based corporation Texas Petroleum, the Colombian legislature, small industrialists, and wealthy cattle ranchers came together in a series of meetings in Puerto Boyacá, and formed a paramilitary organization known as Muerte a Secuestradores ("Death to Kidnappers", MAS) to defend their economic interests, and to provide protection for local elites from kidnappings and extortion. By 1983, Colombian internal affairs had registered 240 political killings by MAS death squads, mostly community leaders, elected officials, and farmers.

On November 19, 1985, Pennzoil won a US$10.53-billion verdict against Texaco, the largest civil verdict in US history up to that date. The court case sprang from Texaco having established a signed contract to buy Getty Oil after Pennzoil entered into an unsigned—yet binding—buyout contract with Gordon Getty. In 1987, Texaco filed for bankruptcy. It was the largest in U.S. history until 2001.

In January 1988, Texaco became the first major corporation in the UK to declare compulsory testing for HIV, a decision denounced by the Lesbian and Gay Employment Rights organisation as 'disastrous, irresponsible and pointless.' It was picketed by protesters from ACT UP London in March 1989, who also called for a British boycott of its petroleum products.

In January 1989, Texaco and Saudi Aramco agreed to form a joint venture known as Star Enterprise in which Saudi Aramco would own a 50% share of Texaco's refining and marketing operations in the eastern U.S. and Gulf Coast. In 1989, Texaco introduced System3 gasolines in all three grades of fuel, featuring the latest detergent additive technology to improve performance by reducing deposits that clog fuel injection systems. The Toronto-based Texaco Canada Incorporated subsidiary was sold to Imperial Oil; some operations had to be resold for competitive reasons to other companies, chiefly to Ultramar, but all Texaco Canada retail operations retained by Imperial were converted to the Esso brand. Two years later, the company was awarded the National Medal of Arts. In 1993, several dozen tribal leaders and residents from the Ecuadoran Amazon filed a billion-dollar class-action lawsuit against Texaco, as a result of massive ecological pollution of the area and rivers around Texaco's Ecuadorian offshore drilling sites, causing toxic contamination of approximately 30,000 residents.

In 1994, Texaco's System3 gasolines were replaced by new CleanSystem3 gasoline, marketed with claims of improved engine performance through additives designed to clean carbon from car-engine intake valves and combustion chambers. In 1995, Texaco merged their Danish and Norwegian downstream operations with those of Norsk Hydro under the new brand HydroTexaco. This joint venture was sold in 2007 to Norwegian retail interests as YX Energi, following the purchase of Hydro by Statoil. In 1996, Texaco paid over $170 million to settle racial discrimination lawsuits filed by Black employees at the company. It was the largest racial-discrimination lawsuit settlement in the U.S. at the time, and was particularly damaging to Texaco's public relations when tapes were released of meetings with company executives planning to destroy incriminating evidence.

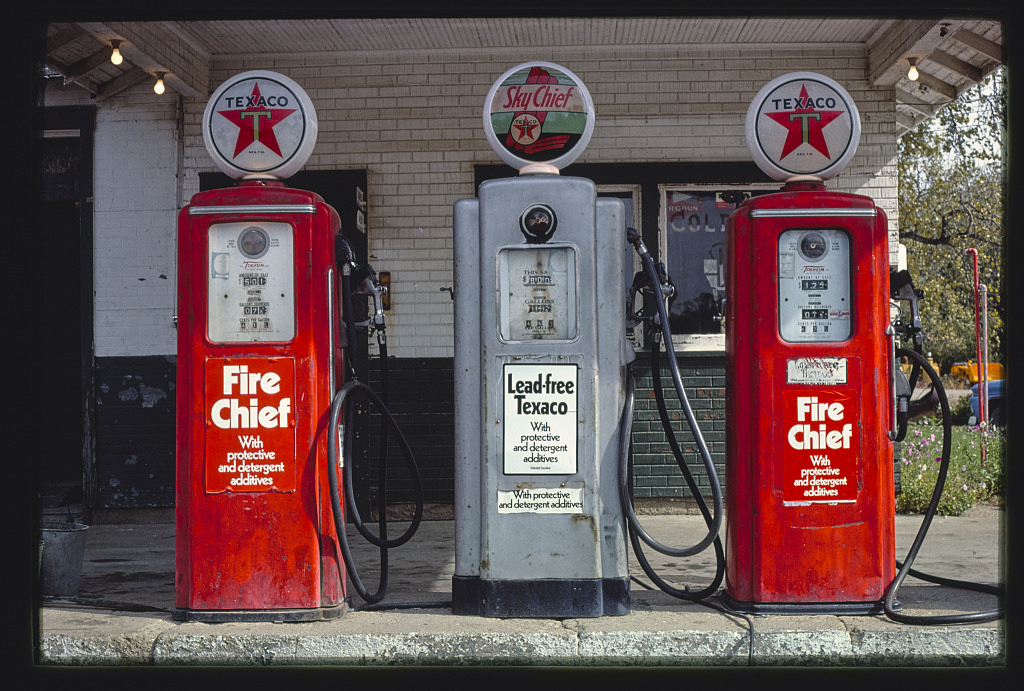
Texaco gas pumps in Milford, Illinois, photographed in 1977

Station in Arroyo Grande, California, 1977

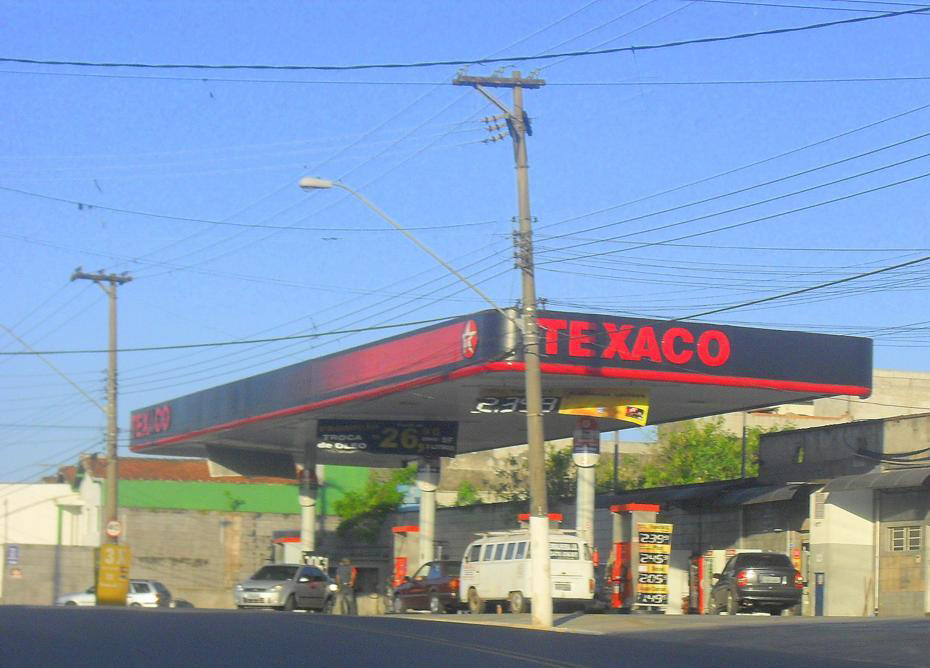
Texaco fuel station in Poá (São Paulo), Brazil, 2009

=== 1999–present: Chevron Corporation ===
In 1999, the company formed the joint venture Equilon with Shell Oil Company, combining their Western and Midwestern U.S. refining and marketing. This gave rise to the 2006 U.S. Supreme Court antitrust case of Texaco Inc. v. Dagher, which cleared both Texaco and Shell of any antitrust liability concerning the pricing of Equilon's gasoline. That same year, another joint venture, Motiva Enterprises, was formed with Shell Oil Company and Saudi Aramco in which the Star Enterprise operations were merged with the Eastern and Gulf Coast U.S. refining and marketing operations of Shell.

In October 2000, Chevron Corporation agreed to buy Texaco for US$36 billion (equivalent to $64 billion in 2025). The merger was completed October 9, 2001. As required by the FTC consent agreement, Texaco's interest in the Equilon and Motiva joint ventures were sold to Shell. Shell began re-branding its Texaco stations as Shell the next year. Around 2003, due to lack of demand, Texaco closed Refineria Panamá, a refinery in Colón, Panama. In July 2004, Chevron regained non-exclusive rights to the Texaco brand name in the U.S. The following year, in August, Texaco introduced the Techron additive into its fuels in the U.S. and parts of Latin America. In 2007, Delek Benelux took over marketing activities for Chevron in Benelux, including 869 filling stations, mostly under the Texaco brand. In 2010, Chevron ended retail operations in the Mid-Atlantic US, removing its brand from 450 stations in Delaware, Indiana, Kentucky, North Carolina, New Jersey, Maryland, Ohio, Pennsylvania, Virginia, West Virginia, Washington, D.C.

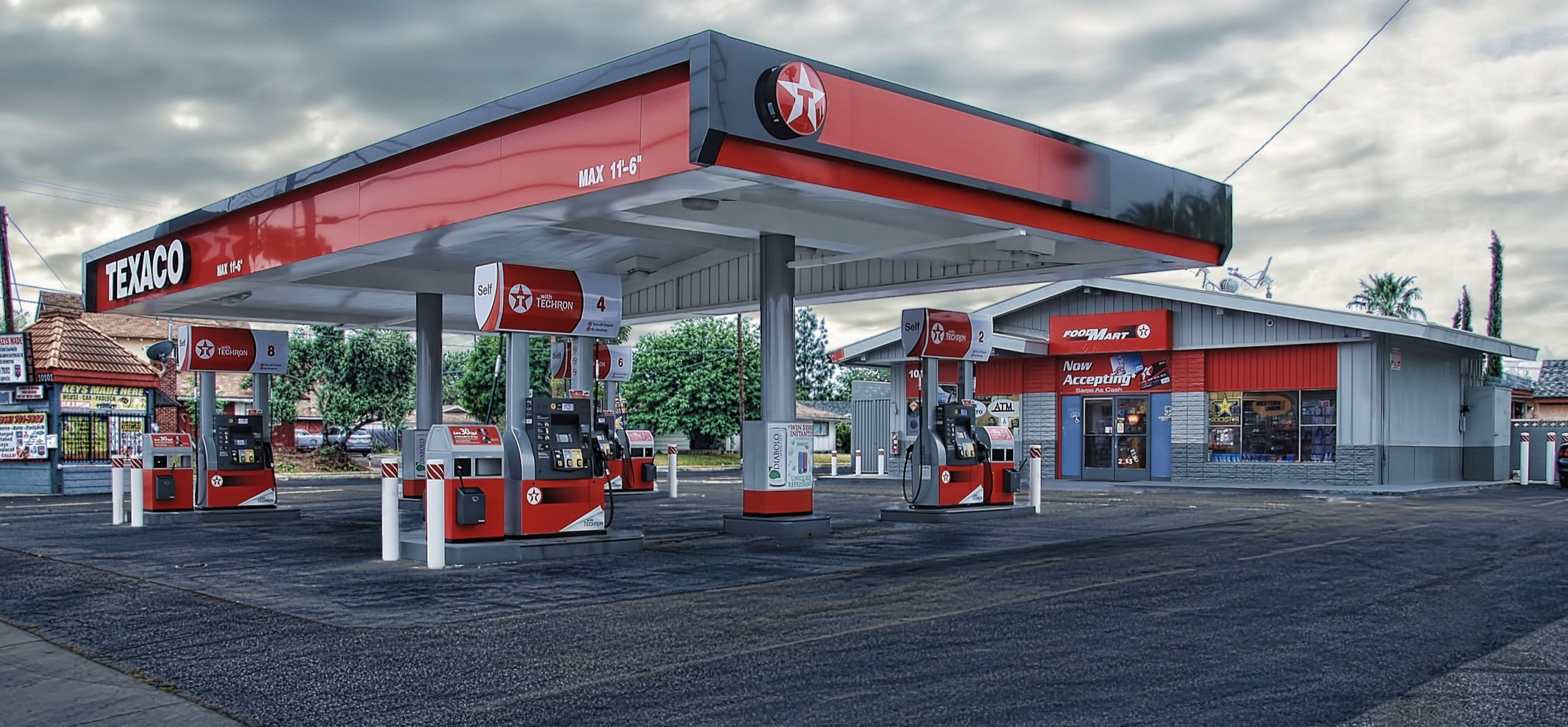
A Texaco station in California, 2011

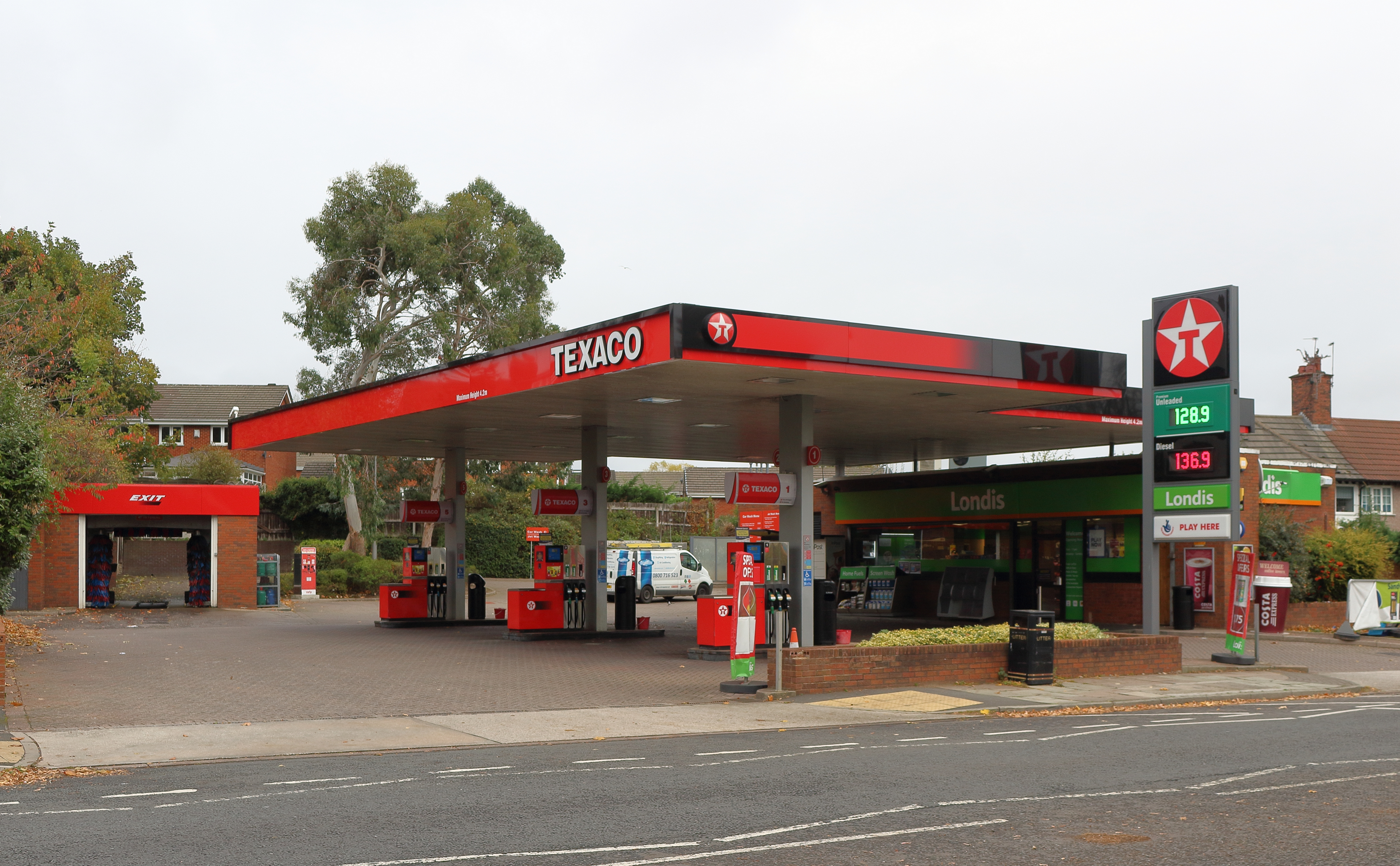
Texaco station in Bebington, UK, 2018

== Corporate headquarters ==
Prior to the merger with Chevron, Texaco's headquarters was a 750,000-square-foot (70,000 m^{2}) building in Harrison, in Westchester County, New York, near White Plains. In 2002, Chevron Corporation sold the former Texaco Headquarters to Morgan Stanley. Morgan Stanley bought the building and the surrounding 107 acres (43 ha) for $42 million.

Texaco leased 14 floors of the Chrysler Building in Midtown Manhattan, New York City in the 1930s. As part of the leasing agreement with Texaco the building opened the Cloud Club, a lunch club for executives. Texaco's move to Westchester County in 1977 contributed to the closure of the Cloud Club in 1979.

== Sponsorships ==
=== Sports ===
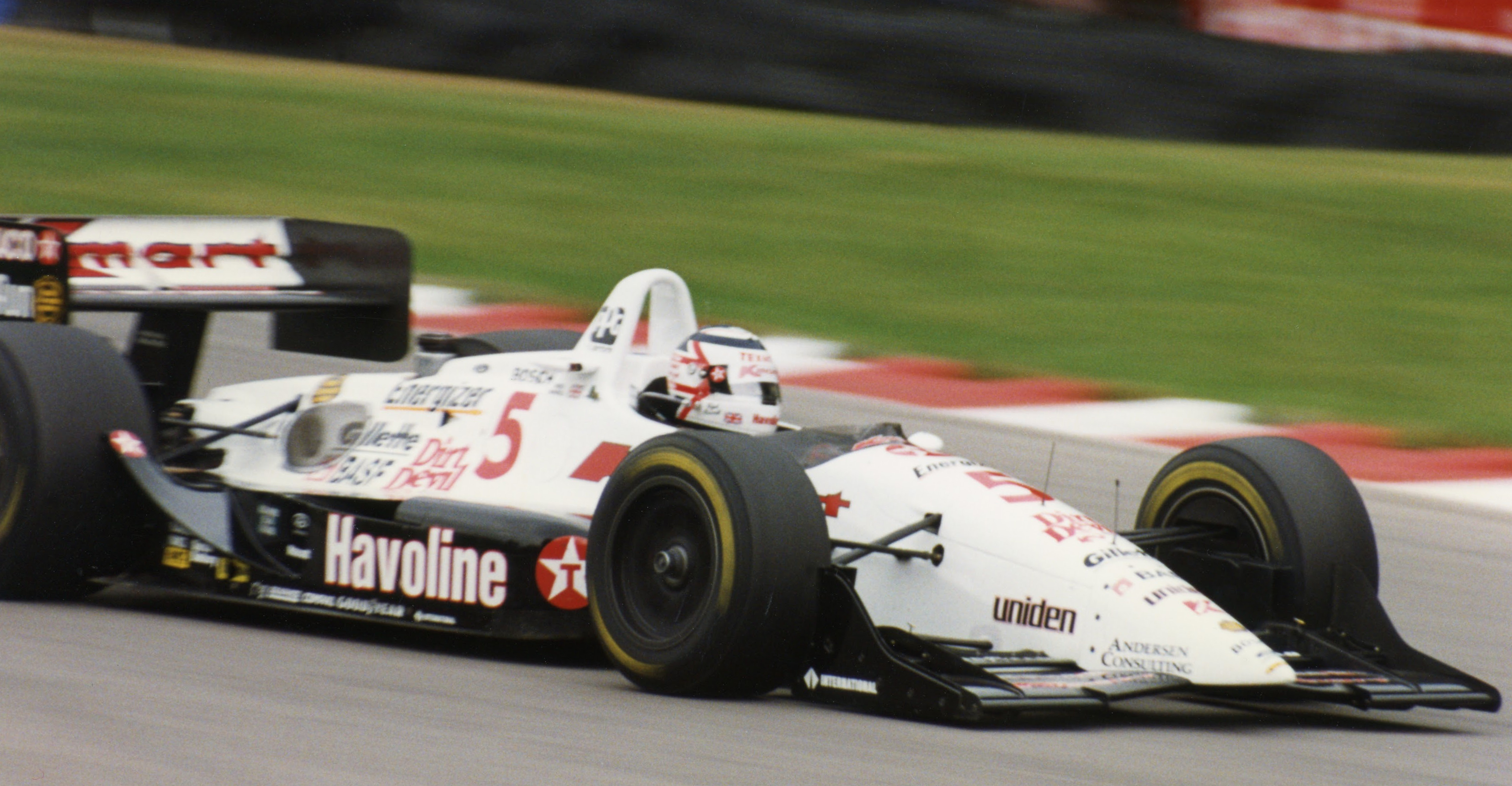
Racing driver Nigel Mansell driving in the 1993 CART IndyCar World Series

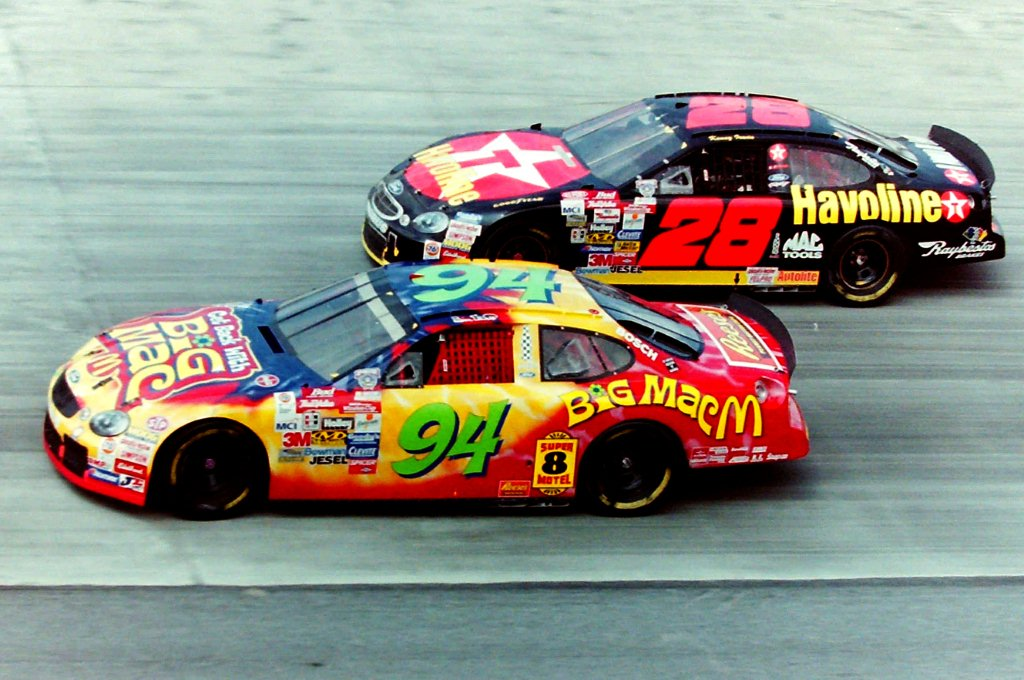
Kenny Irwin Jr. driving in the 1998 NASCAR Winston Cup Series

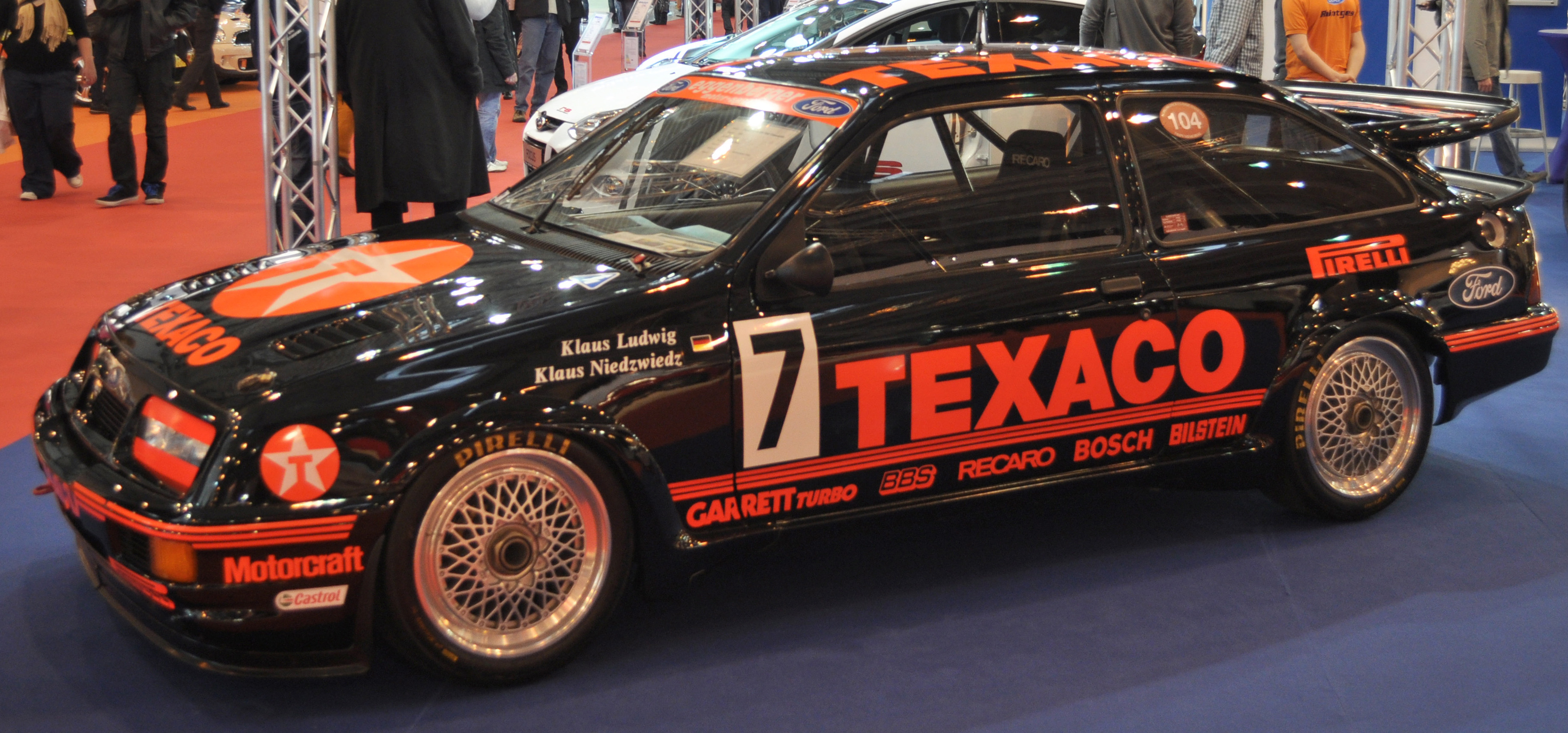
The No.7 Eggenberger Motorsport Ford Sierra RS500 of Klaus Ludwig and Klaus Niedzwiedz. Eggenberger Motorsport won the 1987 WTCC Entrants Championship

Texaco is associated with the Havoline brand of motor oil and other automotive products. It was one of the sponsors of NASCAR with many drivers, such as Davey Allison, Ernie Irvan, Dale Jarrett, Kenny Irwin Jr., Ricky Rudd, Jamie McMurray, Casey Mears, and Juan Pablo Montoya. Havoline continuously sponsored a car from the early 1980s to 2008. At the end of the 2008 season, Texaco/Havoline ended their sponsorship with NASCAR and Chip Ganassi Racing. This brought a 20-plus-year relationship with the sport to a close.

Texaco was also involved in open wheel racing, sponsoring the Texaco Grand Prix of Houston along with sponsoring drivers like Indianapolis 500 winner Mario Andretti and his son Michael.

In Formula One, Texaco sponsored the Team Lotus in 1972 and 1973, and McLaren from 1974 to 1978. The company returned to Grand Prix racing at a smaller scale in 1997, with their brands appearing on the Stewart SF01 car. Their association with the team and its successor, Jaguar Racing, continued until the end of 2001, in the same timeline they also sponsored ITV's Formula 1 Coverage.

Texaco sponsored the Tom Walkinshaw Racing Rover Vitesse factory team at the 1985 and 1986 European Touring Car Championship (ETCC) under their Bastos brand, and the Ford Sierra RS500 factory cars entered by Eggenberger Motorsport in the 1987 World Touring Car Championship (plus the 1988 ETCC and other European-based championships). Texaco also sponsored cars in the 1987 World Rally Championship.

From 1987 to 1993, Texaco was the major sponsor (through its Australian Caltex offshoot) Colin Bond Racing in Australian touring car racing, first with the Alfa Romeo 75 in 1987, then the Ford Sierra RS500 from 1988 to 1992 and then Toyota Corollas in 1993. From 2000 until 2007, it was title sponsor of Stone Brothers Racing with Russell Ingall winning the 2005 championship. In 2016, Caltex became title sponsor of the Triple Eight Race Engineering car of Craig Lowndes, having previously been an associate sponsor of the team.

From 1984 to 1998, Texaco were the title sponsors of the main One Day International cricket tournament in England, the Texaco Trophy. It also sponsored the Texaco Cup, a football tournament for clubs of the British Isles.

=== Entertainment broadcast (music or comedy/variety) ===
Texaco was long associated with the Metropolitan Opera as sole sponsor of its radio broadcasts for 63 years (which air to this day since its inception in 1931), and subsequently the Live from the Met telecasts on PBS. It was identified as well with such entertainment legends as Ed Wynn, Fred Allen and Milton Berle (many of their shows were originally sponsored by Texaco – see Texaco Star Theatre, which includes the sponsorship lyrics of the opening theme: "We're the men of Texaco, We work from Maine to Mexico..."). Berle's program was broadcast in the same time slot as Fulton J. Sheen's religious program for a while, thus leading to Berle's oft-quoted quip, "We both have the same boss – Sky Chief!"

In the 1930s, comedian Ed Wynn hosted a half hour stand-up comedy/variety show on the NBC Radio Network, billed as "The Texaco Fire Chief", a reference to its regular grade gasoline. This trend continued into the late 1940s, when Wynn was replaced by Milton Berle as television becoming the dominant medium. The title was changed to the 60-minute Texaco Star Theater, which was also broadcast on NBC.

In a 1983 video for their song, "Cruel Summer", members of girl group Bananarama are depicted as working as mechanics at a Texaco gas station.

== Environmental issues ==
From 1965 to 1993, Texaco participated in a consortium to develop the Lago Agrio oil field in Ecuador. The company was accused of extensive environmental damage from these operations, and faces legal claims from both private plaintiffs and from the government of Ecuador. The case was widely publicized by environmental activists and was the subject of Crude, a 2009 documentary film by Joe Berlinger.

In turn, Texaco's owner Chevron claims that it was being unfairly targeted as a deep pocket defendant, when the actual responsibility lies with the government and its national oil company, Petroecuador.

Texaco allegedly decided to forgo their standard drilling practices in favor for a minor savings on the cost to produce a barrel of crude oil (approximately $3/barrel). Texaco allegedly dumped toxic wastewater directly into rivers and waste into unlined pits, and created pits that were fitted with overflow pipes to nearby waterways, with pits also never being emptied after the drilling operations were concluded. In total, it is estimated that over 18 billion gallons of toxic waste were released into the Amazon rainforest. In addition to the liquid pollution, it is alleged that workers burned off toxic natural gasses and some liquid waste, thus releasing highly toxic dioxins into the atmosphere.

== Diversification ==
The NiMH chemistry used in modern hybrid vehicles was invented by ECD Ovonics founder Stan Ovshinsky, and Dr. Masahiko Oshitani of the Yuasa Company In 1994, General Motors acquired a controlling interest in Ovonics's battery development and manufacturing. On October 10, 2001, Texaco purchased GM's share in GM Ovonics, and Chevron completed its acquisition of Texaco six days later. In 2003, Texaco Ovonics Battery Systems was restructured into Cobasys, a 50/50 joint venture between Chevron and Energy Conversion Devices (ECD) Ovonics.

== Leadership ==
=== President ===
1. Joseph S. Cullinan, 1902–1913
2. Elgood C. Lufkin, 1913–1920
3. Amos L. Beaty, 1920–1926
4. Ralph C. Holmes, 1926–1933
5. William S. Rodgers, 1933–1944
6. Harry T. Klein, 1944–1952
7. John S. Leach, 1952–1953
8. Augustus C. Long, 1953–1956
9. James W. Foley, 1956–1963
10. J. Howard Rambin Jr, 1964
11. Marion J. Epley, 1965–1970
12. Maurice F. Granville, 1970–1971
13. John K. McKinley, 1971–1983
14. Alfred C. DeCrane Jr, 1983–1986
15. James W. Kinnear, 1987–1993

=== Chairman of the Board ===
1. Elgood C. Lufkin, 1920–1926
2. Amos L. Beaty, 1926–1927
3. Ralph C. Holmes, –1933
4. Charles B. Ames, 1933–1935
5. Torkild Rieber, 1935–1940
6. William S. Rodgers, 1944–1953
7. John S. Leach, 1953–1956
8. Augustus C. Long, 1956–1965
9. J. Howard Rambin Jr, 1965–1970
10. Marion J. Epley, 1970–1971
11. Maurice F. Granville, 1971–1980
12. John K. McKinley, 1980–1986
13. Alfred C. DeCrane Jr, 1987–1996
14. Peter I. Bijur, 1997–2001
15. Glenn F. Tilton, 2001
