= Indian Refining Company =

American oil company in the 20th century

- Industry: Oil industry
- Defunct: 1943
- Fate: Acquired and liquidated by Texas Company
- Headquarters: United States
- Products: Havoline oil
- Owner: Texas Company

The Indian Refining Company was an American oil company in operation from the first decade of the 1900s until April 2, 1943. It was bought by the Texas Company in 1931, and had an oil refinery based in Lawrenceville, Illinois. It was known for patenting the first "wax free" oil under the Havoline brand. Indian Refining Company was liquidated by the Texas Company in 1943.

== Company ==
Texas Company in 1931 acquired the majority of Indian Refining Company's stock.

On January 14, 1943, The New York Times reported the Texas Company had bid to purchase the Indian Refining Company's assets, with Indian Refining to be liquidated. Texas Company owned 91.6% of the stock at the time, Indian Refining had assets of about $12,000,000. In March 1943, Supreme Court Justice Louis A. Valente approved a settlement offer by the Texas Oil Company, as a lawsuit by the Indian Refining Company's minority stockholders over enrichment related to the Indian Refining company liquidation. In April 1943, $550,000 in attorneys' and accountants' fees was awarded by the Supreme Court to the minority stockholders.

== Havoline oil ==
Indian Refining patented the first "wax free" oil under the Havoline brand. Chemists at the Lawrenceville refinery developed the wax free motor oil leading to an Indian Refining patent. The Texas Company (Texaco) acquired Indian Refining in 1931 primarily to access the formulation for wax free motor oil. The oil was further developed and is currently the standard for all conventional motor oils throughout the world.

== Publications ==
- Heavy liquid asphalt binder for road construction, liquid asphalt, road preserver and dust eliminator, 1909
- Inspection of refinery, Georgetown, Ky., by members of The National Petroleum Association, Independent Petroleum Marketers' Association, and by the governor and state officials of Kentucky, 1910
- The old costly method, the economical modern method, 1910
- Havoline tours, book 15, California, 1911
- Annual statement (date unknown)
