= List of private schools in Texas =

This is a list of private schools in Texas. Boarding schools are shown in bold.

== A ==
- AESA Prep Academy in Austin, Texas (K-12)
- Al-Hadi School of Accelerative Learning in Houston, Texas (K-12)
- Alcuin School in Dallas, Texas (PK-12)
- All Saints' Catholic School (Dallas) in Dallas, Texas (K-8)
- All Saints' Catholic School (Fort Worth) in Fort Worth, Texas (K-8)
- All Saints' Episcopal School in Beaumont, Texas (PK-8)
- All Saints' Episcopal School in Fort Worth, Texas (PK-12)
- All Saints Episcopal School (Lubbock, Texas) (PK-12)
- All Saints Episcopal School (Tyler, Texas) (PK-12)
- Allen Academy in Bryan, Texas (PK-12)
- American Heritage Academy in Rosenberg, Texas (PK-6)
- Antonian College Preparatory High School in Castle Hills, Texas (9–12)
- Archway Academy in Houston, Texas (9–12)
- Assumption Catholic School in Houston, Texas (K-8)
- Austin Peace Academy in Austin, Texas (PK-12)
- Awty International School in Houston, Texas (PK-12)

== B ==
- Bay Area Christian School in League City, Texas (K-12)
- Baytown Christian Academy in Baytown, Texas (PK-12)
- Bethesda Christian School in Fort Worth, Texas (K-12)
- Beth Yeshurun Day School in Houston, Texas (PK-5)
- Bishop Dunne Catholic School in Dallas, Texas (6–12)
- Bishop Lynch High School in Dallas, Texas (9–12)
- Bishop Gorman Regional Catholic High School in Tyler, Texas (6–12)
- Blessed Sacrament Catholic School in San Antonio, Texas (K-8)
- Brazos Christian School in Bryan, Texas (PK-12
- Bright Star Christian School www.brightstarchristian.com in Sulphur Springs, Texas (K-12)
- Brentwood Christian School in Austin, Texas (PK-12)
- The Briarwood School in Houston, Texas (K-12)
- Brighter Horizons Academy in Garland, Texas (PK-12)
- Brook Hill School in Bullard, Texas (PK-12)

== C ==
- The Cambridge School of Dallas in Dallas, Texas (5–12)
- Cassata Catholic High School in Fort Worth, Texas (9–12)
- Cathedral High School in El Paso, Texas (9–12)
- Cathedral School of St. Mary in Austin, Texas (K-8)
- Central Catholic Marianist High School in San Antonio, Texas (9–12)
- Challenger School Avery Ranch in Austin, Texas (PK-8)
- The Chinquapin School in Highlands, Texas (serves students from Houston, Texas) (6–12)
- Christ Academy in Wichita Falls, Texas (PK-12)
- Christ the King Catholic School in Dallas, Texas (K-8)
- Christ the Redeemer Catholic School in Cypress, Texas (K-8)
- Christian Heritage School in Tyler, Texas (K-12)
- Cistercian Preparatory School in Irving, Texas (5–12)
- City School Austin in Austin, Texas (PK-8)
- The Clariden School in Southlake, Texas (PK-12)
- Collins Catholic School in Corsicana, Texas (K-8)
- Cunae International School in The Woodlands, Texas (PK-12)
- Concordia Lutheran High School (Texas) in Tomball, Texas (9–12)
- Coram Deo Academy in Dallas, Texas (PK-12)
- Cornerstone Christian Academy in Granbury, Texas (PK-12)
- Cornerstone Christian School in San Antonio, Texas (PK-12)
- Corpus Christi Catholic School in Houston, Texas (K-8)
- Covenant Academy in Cypress, Texas (PK-12)
- Covenant Christian Academy (Colleyville, Texas) (PK-12)
- Covenant Christian School (Conroe, Texas) in Conroe, Texas (PK-12)
- Covenant Classical School in Fort Worth, Texas (K-12)
- Covenant School of Dallas in Dallas, Texas (K-12)
- The Covenant Preparatory School in Houston, Texas (PK-12)
- Cristo Rey Dallas College Prep (9–12)
- Cristo Rey Fort Worth College Prep (9–12)
- Cristo Rey Jesuit College Preparatory of Houston (9–12)
- Cypress Christian School in Cypress, Texas (K-12)

== D ==
- Dallas International School (PK-12)
- Desoto Private School in Desoto, Texas (PK-6)
- Duchesne Academy of the Sacred Heart in Houston, Texas (K-12)

== E ==
- Eagle Christian Academy in Waco, Texas (PK-12)
- The Emery/Weiner School in Houston, Texas (6–12)
- Epiphany of Our Lord Catholic School in Greater Katy (K-8)
- Episcopal School of Dallas in Dallas, Texas (PK-12)
- Episcopal High School in Bellaire, Texas (9–12)
- Explorations Preparatory School in Flower Mound, Texas (PK-6)
- E. A. Young Academy in North Richland Hills, Texas (K-12)

== F ==
- Fairhill School in Dallas, Texas (1–12)
- Faith Lutheran School in Plano, Texas (PK-12)
- Father Yermo Schools in El Paso, Texas (PK-12)
- Fort Worth Country Day School in Fort Worth, Texas (PK-12)
- Fort Bend Christian Academy (PK-12)
- Fort Worth Christian School in Fort Worth, Texas (PK-12)
- Frassati Catholic High School in Spring, Texas (9–12)

== G ==
- Garland Christian Academy in Garland, Texas (PK-12)
- Geneva School of Boerne in Boerne, Texas (K-12)
- Good Shepherd Catholic School in Garland, Texas (K-8)
- Grace Preparatory Academy (K-12)
- Great Oak School in Tomball, TX (PK-8)
- Greenhill School (Addison, Texas) (PK-12)
- Grapevine Faith Christian School in Grapevine, Texas (PK-12)
- Grace Community School in Tyler, Texas (PK-12)

== H ==
- Harvest Time Christian Academy in Tyler, Texas (PK-12)
- Headwaters School in Austin, Texas (PK-12)
- The Highlands School in Irving (PK-12)
- The Hockaday School in Dallas, Texas (PK-12)
- Holy Cross of San Antonio (6–12)
- Holy Family Catholic Academy in Irving, Texas (K-8)
- Holy Family Catholic School (Austin) (K-8)
- Holy Family Catholic School (Dallas) (K-8)
- Holy Family Catholic School (Galveston) (K-8)
- Holy Family Catholic School (Fort Worth) in Fort Worth, Texas (K-8)
- Holy Ghost Catholic School in Houston, Texas (K-8)
- Holy Name Catholic School in San Antonio, Texas (K-8)
- Holy Rosary Catholic School (Galveston) (K-8)
- Holy Rosary Catholic School (Rosenberg) (K-8)
- Holy Spirit Catholic School in San Antonio, Texas (K-8)
- Holy Trinity Catholic High School in Temple, Texas (9–12)
- Holy Trinity Catholic School in Grapevine, Texas (K-8)
- Houston Christian High School in Houston, Texas (9–12)
- Hyde Park Schools in Austin, Texas (K-12)

== I ==
- IANT Quranic Academy in Richardson, Texas (PK-12)
- Iman Academy in Houston, Texas (PK-12)
- Immaculate Conception Catholic School (Grand Prairie) in Grand Prairie (K-8)
- Immaculate Conception Catholic School (Fort Worth) in Fort Worth, Texas (K-8)
- Incarnate Word Academy (Houston) (9–12)
- Incarnate Word High School (San Antonio, Texas) (9–12)
- International School of San Antonio (San Antonio, Texas) (PK-5)
- Islamic Education Institute of Texas in Houston, Texas (PK-12)
- Islamic School of Irving (PK-12)

== J ==
- Jesuit College Preparatory School in Dallas, Texas (9–12)
- John Cooper School in The Woodlands, Texas (PK-12)
- John Paul II Catholic High School (Schertz, Texas) (9–12)
- John Paul II Catholic School (Houston) (K-8)
- John Paul II High School (Plano, Texas) (9–12)
- June Shelton School in Dallas, Texas (PK-12)

== K ==
- Kaufman Christian School in Kaufman, Texas (PK-8)
- Keene Adventist Elementary School in Keene, Texas (PK-8)
- Keystone School in San Antonio, Texas (PK-12)
- King's Academy Christian School in Tyler, Texas (K-12)
- Kingdom Collegiate Academies in Dallas (PK-12)
- Kinkaid School in Houston, Texas (PK-12)
- Kirby Hall School in Austin, Texas (PK-12)

== L ==
- Lakehill Preparatory School in Dallas, Texas (K-12)
- Legacy Classical Christian Academy in Haslet, Texas (PK-12)
- Legacy Christian Academy (Beaumont, Texas) (PK-12)
- Legacy Christian Academy (Frisco, Texas) (PK-12)
- Liberty Christian School (Argyle, Texas) (PK-12)
- Lifegate Christian School in Seguin, Texas (K-12)
- Little Flower Catholic School in San Antonio, Texas (K-8)
- Live Oak Classical School in Waco, Texas (PK-12)
- Loretto Academy (El Paso, Texas) (K-12)
- Lucas Christian Academy in Lucas, Texas (PK-12)
- Lutheran High School of San Antonio (9–12)

== M ==
- Marine Military Academy in Harlingen, Texas (7–12)
- Mary Immaculate Catholic School in Farmers Branch, Texas (K-8)
- Mirus Academy in Katy, Texas (8–12)
- The Monarch School in Hilshire Village, Texas (PK-12)
- Monsignor Kelly Catholic High School in Beaumont, Texas (9–12)
- Most Holy Trinity Catholic School in El Paso, Texas (K-8)
- Mount Sacred Heart Catholic School in San Antonio, Texas (K-8)
- Mount St. Michael Catholic School in Dallas, Texas (K-8)

== N ==
- Nazareth Academy in Victoria, Texas(K-8)
- New Braunfels Christian Academy in New Braunfels, Texas (PK-12)
- North Central Texas Academy in Granbury, Texas (K-12)
- Nolan Catholic High School in Fort Worth, Texas (9–12)
- Notre Dame Catholic School in Kerrville, Texas (K-8)
- Notre Dame School of Dallas (1-postgrad)

== O ==
- Oak Crest Private School in Carrollton, Texas (PK-8)
- The Oakridge School in Arlington, Texas (PK-12)
- O'Connell College Preparatory School in Galveston, Texas (9–12)
- Our Lady of Fatima Catholic School (Galena Park) (K-8)
- Our Lady of Fatima Catholic School (Texas City) (K-8)
- Our Lady of Grace Catholic School in Pleasanton, Texas (K-8)
- Our Lady of Guadalupe School (Houston) (K-8)
- Our Lady of the Gulf Catholic School in Port Lavaca, Texas (K-8)
- Our Lady of the Hills High School in Kerrville, Texas (9–12)
- Our Lady of Lourdes Catholic School in Hitchcock, Texas (PK-6)
- Our Lady of Perpetual Help Catholic School (Dallas) (K-8)
- Our Lady of Perpetual Help Catholic School (San Antonio) (K-8)
- Our Lady of Victory Catholic School (Fort Worth) (K-8)
- Our Lady of Victory Catholic School (Victoria) (K-8)
- Our Lady Queen of Peace Catholic School in Richwood, Texas (K-8)
- Ovilla Christian School in Ovilla, Texas (K-12)

== P ==
- Parish Episcopal School in Dallas, Texas (PK-12)
- Pebblecreek Montessori School in Plano, Texas (PK-6)
- Pope John XXIII High School in Katy, Texas (9–12)
- Prestonwood Christian Academy in Plano, Texas (PK-12)
- Prince of Peace Catholic School in Plano, Texas (K-8)
- Prince of Peace Christian School in Carrollton, Texas (PK-12)
- Providence High School (San Antonio) (6–12)

== R ==
- Radford School in El Paso, Texas (PK-12)
- Regents School of Austin in Austin, Texas (K-12)
- The Regis School of the Sacred Heart in Houston, Texas (PK-8)
- Reicher Catholic High School in Waco, Texas (PK-12)
- Resurrection Catholic School in Houston, Texas (K-8)
- Rosehill Christian School in Tomball, Texas (PK-12)

== S ==
- Sacred Heart Catholic School (Conroe) (K-8)
- Sacred Heart Catholic School (Crosby) (K-8)
- Sacred Heart Catholic School (Del Rio) (K-8)
- Sacred Heart Catholic School (Floresville) (K-8)
- Sacred Heart Catholic School (Hallettsville, Texas) (9–12)
- Sacred Heart Catholic School (LaGrange) (K-8)
- Sacred Heart Catholic School (Uvalde) (K-8)
- Sacred Heart Catholic School (Muenster, Texas) (PK-12)
- Saint Agnes Academy in Houston, Texas (9–12)
- St. Ambrose Catholic School in Houston, Texas (K-8)
- St. Andrew Catholic School in Fort Worth, Texas (K-8)
- St. Andrew's Episcopal School in Austin, Texas (K-12)
- St. Anne's Catholic School (Houston) (K-8)
- St. Anne's Catholic School (Tomball) (K-8)
- St. Anthony Catholic High School in San Antonio, Texas (9–12)
- St. Anthony Catholic School (Columbus) (K-8)
- St. Anthony Catholic School (San Antonio) (K-8)
- St. Anthony of Padua Catholic School in The Woodlands, Texas (K-8)
- St. Augustine Catholic School in Houston, Texas (K-8)
- St. Austin Catholic School in Austin, Texas (K-8)
- St. Bernard Catholic School in Dallas, Texas (K-8)
- St. Catherine's Montessori School in Houston, Texas (PK-9)
- St. Cecilia Catholic School (Dallas) (K-8)
- St. Cecelia Catholic School (Hedwig Village) (K-8)
- St. Christopher Catholic School in Houston, Texas (K-8)
- St. Clare of Assisi Catholic School in Houston, Texas (K-8)
- St. Dominic Savio Catholic High School in Austin, Texas (9–12)
- St. Edward Catholic School in Spring, Texas (K-8)
- St. Elizabeth Ann Seton Catholic School (Houston) (K-8)
- St. Elizabeth Ann Seton Catholic School (Keller) (K-8)
- St. Elizabeth of Hungary Catholic School in Dallas, Texas (K-8)
- St. Francis de Sales Catholic School in Houston, Texas (K-8)
- St. Gabriel's School in Austin, Texas (K-8)
- St. George Catholic School in Fort Worth, Texas (K-8)
- St. Gerard Catholic High School in San Antonio (9–12)
- St. Gregory the Great Catholic School in San Antonio, Texas (K-8)
- St. Helen Catholic School (Georgetown) (K-8)
- St. Helen Catholic School (Pearland)(K-8)
- St. Ignatius Martyr Catholic School in Austin, Texas (K-8)
- St. James Catholic School in Seguin, Texas (K-8)
- St. James the Apostle Catholic School in San Antonio, Texas (K-8)
- St. Jerome Catholic School in Houston, Texas (K-8)
- St. John's School in Houston, Texas (K-12)
- St. John the Apostle Catholic School in North Richland Hills, Texas (K-8)
- St. John Berchmans Catholic School in San Antonio, Texas (K-8)
- St. John Bosco Catholic School in San Antonio, Texas (K-8)
- St. John's Episcopal School in Dallas, Texas (PK-8)
- Saint John XXIII High School in Katy, Texas (9–12)
- St. Jose Sanchez del Rio Catholic School in San Antonio, Texas (K-8)
- Saint Joseph Academy (Brownsville, Texas) (7–12)
- St. Joseph Catholic School (Bryan, Texas) (PK-12)
- St. Joseph Catholic School (Arlington) (K-8)
- St. Joseph Catholic School (Baytown) (PK-6)
- St. Joseph Catholic School (El Paso) (K-8)
- St. Joseph Catholic School (Killeen) (K-8)
- St. Joseph Catholic School (Richardson) (K-8)
- St. Joseph Catholic School (Waxahachie) (K-8)
- St. Joseph Catholic School (Yoakum) (K-8)
- St. Joseph High School (Victoria, Texas) (9–12)
- St. Laurence Catholic School in Sugar Land, Texas (K-8)
- St. Louis Catholic School (Austin) (K-8)
- St. Louis Catholic School (Castroville) (K-8)
- St. Luke Catholic School in San Antonio, Texas (K-8)
- St. Maria Goretti Catholic School in Arlington, Texas (K-8)
- St. Mark Catholic School in Plano, Texas (K-8)
- St. Mark's School in Dallas, Texas (1–12)
- St. Martha Catholic School in Houston, Texas (K-8)
- St. Martin de Porres Catholic School in Prosper, Texas (K-8)
- St. Mary Catholic School (Fredericksburg) (K-8)
- St. Mary Catholic School (Gainesville) (K-8)
- St. Mary Catholic School (League City) (K-8)
- St. Mary Catholic School (Sherman) in (K-8)
- St. Mary's Catholic School (Taylor) (K-8)
- St. Mary's Catholic School (Temple) (K-8)
- St. Mary's Catholic School (West) (K-8)
- St. Mary's Hall (San Antonio, Texas) (PK-12)
- St. Mary of Carmel Catholic School in Dallas, Texas (K-8)
- St. Mary Magdalene Catholic School (Humble) (K-8)
- St. Mary Magdalene Catholic School (San Antonio) (K-8)
- St. Mary of the Purification Catholic School in Houston, Texas (K-5)
- St. Matthew Catholic School (El Paso) (K-8)
- St. Matthew Catholic School (San Antonio) (K-8)
- St. Michael's Academy in Austin, Texas (9–12)
- St. Michael Catholic School (Cuero) (K-8)
- St. Michael Catholic School (Houston) (K-8)
- St. Michael Catholic School (Weimar) (K-8)
- St. Monica Catholic School (Dallas) (K-8)
- St. Monica Catholic School (San Antonio) (K-8)
- St. Patrick Catholic School (Dallas) (K-8)
- St. Patrick Catholic School (El Paso) (K-8)
- St. Peter the Apostle Catholic School in Fort Worth, Texas (K-8)
- St. Paul Catholic School in San Antonio, Texas (K-8)
- St. Paul the Apostle Catholic School in Richardson, Texas (K-8)
- St. Peter, Prince of the Apostles Catholic School in San Antonio, Texas (K-8)
- Sts. Peter and Paul Catholic School in New Braunfels, Texas (K-8)
- St. Philip Catholic School in El Campo, Texas (K-8)
- St. Philip's School and Community Center in Dallas, Texas (PK-8)
- St. Pius X Catholic School (Dallas) (K-8)
- St. Pius X Catholic School (El Paso) (K-8)
- St. Pius X Catholic School (San Antonio) (K-8)
- St. Pius X High School (Houston) (9–12)
- St. Raphael Catholic School in El Paso, Texas (K-8)
- St. Rita Catholic School (Dallas) in Dallas, Texas (K-8)
- St. Rita Catholic School (Fort Worth) in Fort Worth, Texas (K-8)
- St. Rose of Lima Catholic School (Houston) (K-8)
- St. Rose of Lima Catholic School (Schulenberg) (K-8)
- St. Stephen's Episcopal School (Austin, Texas) (6–8)
- St. Theresa Catholic School (Houston) (K-8)
- St. Theresa Catholic School (Sugar Land) (K-8)
- St. Theresa's Catholic School in Austin, Texas (K-8)
- St. Thomas Aquinas Catholic School in Dallas, Texas (K-8)
- St. Thomas High School (Houston) (9–12)
- St. Thomas More Catholic School (Houston) (K-8)
- St. Thomas More Catholic School (San Antonio) (K-8)
- St. Vincent de Paul Catholic School in Houston, Texas (K-8)
- Salam Academy (PK-12)
- San Antonio Academy (3–8)
- San Antonio Christian School (PK-12)
- San Juan Diego Catholic High School (Austin, Texas) (9–12)
- San Marcos Baptist Academy (6–12)
- Santa Clara of Assisi Catholic School in Dallas, Texas (K-8)
- Santa Cruz Catholic School in Austin, Texas (K-8)
- Selwyn School in Denton, Texas (PK-12)
- Shiner Catholic School in Shiner, Texas (PK-12) (St. Lumila Elementary/St. Paul High)
- Strake Jesuit College Preparatory in Houston, Texas (9–12)

== T ==
- Texas School for the Deaf Austin, Texas (PK-12)
- TMI Episcopal in San Antonio, Texas (6–12)
- Trinity Christian Academy (Addison, Texas) (PK-12)
- Trinity Christian High School (Lubbock, Texas) (9–12)
- Trinity Classical School (Houston, Texas) (PK-12)
- Trinity Episcopal School of Austin (K-8)
- Trinity Preparatory Academy in Watauga, Texas (K-12)
- Trinity School of Texas in Longview, Texas (PK-12)
- Trinity Valley School in Fort Worth, Texas (PK-12)
- True Cross Catholic School in Dickinson, Texas (K-8)

== U ==
- Ursuline Academy of Dallas in Dallas, Texas (9–12)

== V ==
- Veritas Academy (Austin, Texas) (PK-12)
- Vanguard College Preparatory School in Waco, Texas (7–12)
- Village School in Houston, TX (PK-12)

== W ==
- Westbury Christian School in Houston, TX (PK-12)
- The Winston School in Dallas, Texas (K-12)

== Z ==
- Zion Lutheran School in Georgetown, Texas

== See also ==
- List of school districts in Texas
- List of high schools in Texas
- Southwest Preparatory Conference
