= List of schools in the Roman Catholic Archdiocese of San Antonio =

List of schools under Roman Catholic control

This is a list of schools in the Roman Catholic Archdiocese of San Antonio.

== High schools ==
- Antonian College Preparatory High School, Castle Hills (Est. 1964)
- Central Catholic Marianist High School, San Antonio (Est. 1852)
- Holy Cross of San Antonio, San Antonio (Est. 1957)
- Incarnate Word High School, San Antonio (Est. 1881)
- St. John Paul II Catholic High School, Schertz (Est. 2009)
- Our Lady of the Hills College Prep, Kerrville (Est. 2013)
- Providence High School, San Antonio (Est. 1951) Independent
- St. Anthony Catholic High School, San Antonio (Est. 1903)

== Grade schools ==
=== In San Antonio ===
- Blessed Sacrament Catholic School
- Holy Name Catholic School
- Holy Spirit Catholic School
- Little Flower Catholic School
- Mount Sacred Heart Catholic School
- St. Anthony Catholic School (Est. 1907)
- St. Gregory the Great Catholic School
- St. James the Apostle Catholic School
- St. John Berchmans Catholic School
- St. John Bosco Catholic School
- St. Luke Catholic School
- St. Mary Magdalen Dual Language Catholic School
- St. Matthew Catholic School (Est. 1993)
- St. Monica Catholic School
- St. Paul Catholic School
- St. Pius X Catholic School
- St. Thomas More Catholic School

=== Outside of San Antonio ===
- Notre Dame Catholic School (Kerrville)
- Our Lady of Grace Catholic School (Pleasanton)
- Our Lady of Perpetual Help School (Selma)
- Sacred Heart School (Del Rio)
- Sacred Heart School (Floresville)
- Sacred Heart School (Uvalde)
- St. James Catholic School (Seguin)
- St. Louis Catholic School (Castroville)
- St. Mary Catholic School (Fredericksburg)
- St. Monica Catholic School (Converse)
- Sts. Peter and Paul Catholic School (New Braunfels)

== Former schools ==
- St. Francis Academy - High school for girls
- St. Gerard Catholic High School (1927–2022)
- St. Jose Sanchez del Rio Catholic School
- St. Mary's School by the Riverwalk (1910–2004)
- St. Peter, Prince of the Apostles School
