= List of schools in the Roman Catholic Diocese of Fort Worth =

This is a list of schools in the Roman Catholic Diocese of Fort Worth.

== K-12 schools ==
- Sacred Heart Catholic School, Muenster

== High schools ==
- Cassata Catholic High School (Fort Worth)
- Nolan Catholic High School (Fort Worth)

Note that Cristo Rey Fort Worth College Prep is separate from the diocese.

== Grade schools ==
- All Saints School (Fort Worth)
- Holy Family School (Fort Worth)
- Holy Trinity School (Grapevine)
- Immaculate Conception School (Denton)
- Our Lady of Victory School (Fort Worth)
- Saint Andrew School (Fort Worth)
- St. Elizabeth Ann Seton School (Keller)
- St. George School (Fort Worth)
- St. John the Apostle School (North Richland Hills)
- St. Joseph School (Arlington)
- St. Maria Goretti (Arlington)
- St. Martin de Porres School (Prosper)
- St. Mary School (Gainesville)
- St. Peter the Apostle School (Fort Worth)
- St. Rita School (Fort Worth)

== Former schools ==
- Our Mother of Mercy School was previously in operation. In 2016 the diocese announced that the school would close and its building would become Cristo Rey Fort Worth College Prep.
- Notre Dame Catholic School (Wichita Falls)
