= List of schools in the Roman Catholic Diocese of Austin =

This is a list of schools in the Roman Catholic Diocese of Austin.

== K-12 schools ==
- Bishop Louis Reicher Catholic School, Waco
- St. Joseph Catholic High School, Bryan
- St. Mary's Catholic School (Taylor) - Founded in 1896 opening with 80 students and is the oldest private school in Williamson County.
- St. Michael's Catholic Preparatory School, Austin

== High schools ==
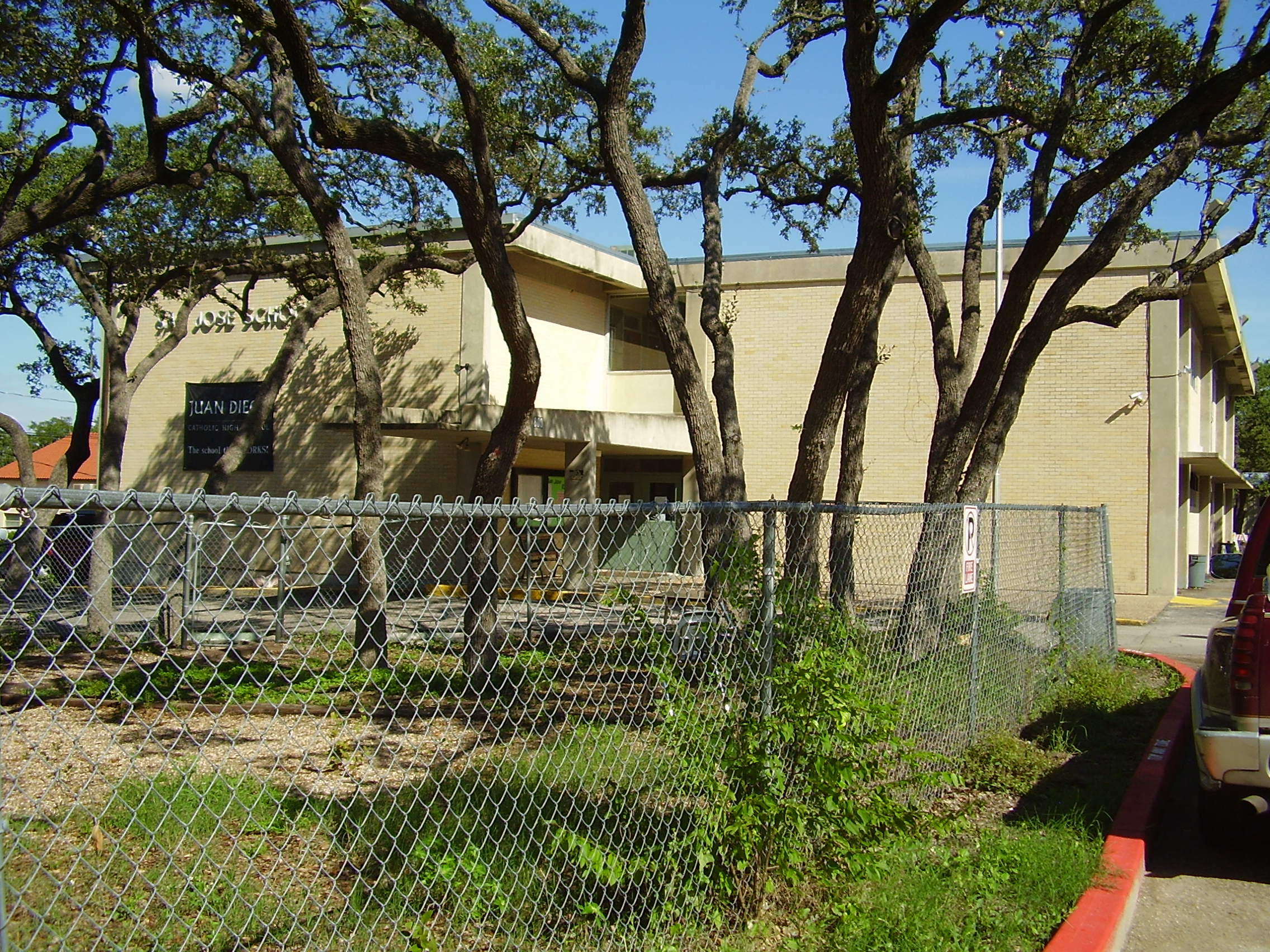
San Juan Diego Catholic High School

- Holy Trinity Catholic High School, Temple
- San Juan Diego Catholic High School, Austin
- St. Dominic Savio Catholic High School, Austin

== Grade schools ==
- Cathedral School of Saint Mary (Austin)
- Holy Family Catholic School (Austin)
- Sacred Heart Catholic School (LaGrange)
- Santa Cruz Catholic School (Buda)
- St. Austin Catholic School (Austin)
- St. Helen Catholic School (Georgetown)
- St. Ignatius Martyr Catholic School (Austin) - It was established on August 15, 1940 with its opening on September 15 of that year. Its first enrollment consisted of 65 children. Initially classes were held in the basement. The permanent school building, with a capacity of 450 students, opened in 1954.
- St. Joseph Catholic Elementary School (Bryan)
- St. Joseph Catholic School (Killeen)
- St. Louis Catholic School (Austin)
- St. Mary's Catholic School (Temple)
- St. Mary's Catholic School (West)
- St. Theresa's Catholic School (Austin)
