= List of schools of the Diocese of Victoria in Texas =

This is a list of schools of the Diocese of Victoria in Texas

== K-12 schools ==
- Sacred Heart High School, Hallettsville
- Shiner Catholic School, Shiner (includes St. Paul High School and St. Ludmila Academy)

== High schools ==
- St. Joseph High School, Victoria

== K-8 schools ==
K-8 schools include:

- St. Anthony School (Columbus) - Established in 1955
- St. Michael School (Cuero) - Established in 1877
- St. Philip School (El Campo) - Established in 1949
- Our Lady of the Gulf School (Port Lavaca) - Established in 1996
- St. Rose of Lima School (Schulenberg) - Established in 1889
- Our Lady of Victory School (Victoria) - Established in 1957
- Nazareth Academy - A private Catholic school (not directly operated by a parish) operated by the Sisters of the Incarnate Word and Blessed Sacrament, it opened on January 7, 1867.
- St. Michael School (Weimar) - Established in 1890
- St. Joseph School (Yoakum) - Established in 1891

== Elementary schools ==
- Holy Cross Elementary School (Bay City) - It was established in fall 1940, originally as a K-8 school, by two members of the Benedictine Oblate order and a reverend. The Sisters of the Incarnate Word and Blessed Sacrament gained management of the school the following year. It became a K-6 school only after 1966. In 1987 a gymnasium was installed, and two classrooms were added after that. The school gained preschool classes in fall 2015 and became a PreK-5 school in 2018. Angela Kupcho became the principal in 2019.
