= Southwest Preparatory Conference =

High school athletics conference in Texas, US

The Southwest Preparatory Conference (SPC) is an athletic conference for large, elite private high schools in Texas. It is composed of the following schools:

== Current members ==
*	Indicates member joining in 2026–27						
Institution	Location	Year founded	Population	Type	Nickname	Colors	Former TAPPS Member?
Awty International School	Houston, Texas	1956	1,754 (2022)	Coed (Nonsectarian)	Rams	Green, Gold	Yes
Cistercian Preparatory School	Irving, Texas	1962	355 (2020)	Boys (Catholic)	Hawks	Black, White	Yes
Duchesne Academy of the Sacred Heart	Houston, Texas	1960	750 (2022)	Girls (Catholic)	Chargers	Navy, Light Blue	Yes
Episcopal High School	Bellaire, Texas	1983	797 (2020)	Coed (Episcopal)	Knights	Blue, White	Yes
Episcopal School of Dallas	Dallas, Texas	1974	1,170+	Coed (Episcopal)	Eagles	Blue, White	Yes
Fort Worth Country Day School	Fort Worth, Texas	1963	1,116	Coed (Nonsectarian)	Falcons	Red, Blue	Yes
Greenhill School	Addison, Texas	1950	1,279	Coed (Nonsectarian)	Hornets	Green, Gold	No
Hockaday School	Dallas, Texas	1913	1,113	Girls (Nonsectarian)	Daisies	Green, White	No
Houston Christian High School	Houston, Texas	1998	470 (2021)	Coed (Christian)	Mustangs	Blue, White	Yes
The John Cooper School	The Woodlands, Texas	1988	1,365	Coed (Nonsectarian)	Dragons	Green, Black	Yes
The Kinkaid School	Piney Point Village, Texas	1906	1,375 (2015)	Coed (Nonsectarian)	Falcons	Purple, Gold	Yes
The Oakridge School	Arlington, Texas	1979	800 (2017)	Coed (Nonsectarian)	Owls	Green, Navy	Yes
St. Andrew's Episcopal School	Austin, Texas	1952	941	Coed (Episcopal)	Highlanders	Blue, Black, White	No
St. John's School	Houston, Texas	1946	1,493	Coed (Nonsectarian)	Mavericks	Red, Black	No
Saint Mary's Hall*	San Antonio, Texas	1879	790	Coed (Christian)	Barons	Purple, White	Yes
St. Mark's School of Texas	Dallas, Texas	1906	911	Boys (Nonsectarian)	Lions	Blue, Gold	No
St. Stephen's Episcopal School	Austin, Texas	1950	694	Coed (Episcopal)	Spartans	Purple, Red	No
Texas Military Institute*	San Antonio, Texas	1893	552	Coed (Episcopal)	Panthers	Black, Orange	Yes
Trinity Valley School	Fort Worth, Texas	1959	1,017 (2020)	Coed (Nonsectarian)	Trojans	Blue, White	No

== Former members ==
Institution	Location	Year founded	Population	Type	Nickname	Colors	Left SPC	Current Conference
All Saints' Episcopal School	Fort Worth, Texas	1951	1,264	Coed (Episcopal)	Saints	Navy, White	2018	TAPPS (Note: All Saints' had previously been a member of TAPPS before joining the SPC in 2000.)
Allen Academy	Bryan, Texas	1886	340	Coed (Nonsectarian)	Rams	Blue, Gold	1970s	TAPPS
Casady School	Oklahoma City, Oklahoma	1947	1,020	Coed (Episcopal)	Cyclones	Navy Blue, White	2024	OSSAA
Holland Hall	Tulsa, Oklahoma	1922	1,034	Coed (Episcopal)	Dutch	Red, Black, White	2016	OSSAA
Lutheran High School	Houston, Texas	1949	960	Coed (Lutheran)	Pioneers	Green, Silver	1970s	TAPPS
Wichita Collegiate School	Wichita, Kansas	1963	966	Coed (Nonsectarian)	Spartans	Royal Blue, Gold	N/A	AVCTL (Note: Ark Valley Chisholm Trail League)

== See also ==
- List of private schools in Texas
- Texas Association of Private and Parochial Schools (TAPPS)
