= List of schools in the Roman Catholic Diocese of Dallas =

This is a list of schools in the Catholic Diocese of Dallas in Texas (U.S.).

== PK-12 schools ==
- Notre Dame School of Dallas (Special Education)
- The Highlands School (non-diocesan)

== 5-12 schools ==
- Cistercian Preparatory School (Irving) - Boys only, non-diocesan

== High schools ==
- Bishop Dunne Catholic School, Dallas
- Bishop Lynch High School, Dallas
- John Paul II High School, Plano

Non Diocesan Catholic schools

- Cristo Rey Dallas College Prep
- Jesuit College Preparatory School of Dallas
- Ursuline Academy

== Grade schools ==
- All Saints Catholic School (Dallas)
- Bishop Dunne Catholic School (Dallas)
- Christ the King Catholic School (Dallas)
- James L. Collins Catholic School (Corsicana)
- Good Shepherd Catholic School (Garland)
- Holy Family Catholic Academy (Irving)
- Holy Trinity Catholic School (Dallas)
- Immaculate Conception Catholic School (Grand Prairie)
- Mary Immaculate Catholic School (Farmers Branch)
- Mount St. Michael Catholic School (Dallas)
- Our Lady of Perpetual Help School (Dallas)
- Prince of Peace Catholic School (Plano)
- Santa Clara of Assisi Catholic School (Dallas)
- St. Bernard Catholic School (Dallas)
- St. Cecilia Catholic School (Dallas)
- St. Elizabeth of Hungary Catholic School (Dallas)
- St. Joseph Catholic School (Richardson)
- St. Joseph Catholic School (Waxahachie)
- St. Mark Catholic School (Plano)
- St. Mary Catholic School (Sherman)
- St. Mary of Carmel Catholic School (Dallas)
- St. Monica Catholic School (Dallas) - The school was established on February 1, 1954. In June of that year the church paid Knowlton Construction Company $450,200 to build the school. A fundraiser campaign for a permanent school was held in November that year. Groundbreaking for temporary buildings occurred on February 21, 1955. The permanent school opened on October 24 of that year.
- St. Patrick Catholic School (Dallas)
- St. Paul the Apostle Catholic School (Richardson)
- St. Philip & St. Augustine Catholic Academy (Dallas)
- St. Pius X Catholic School (Dallas)
- St. Rita Catholic School (Dallas) - The school opened in 1964, and after that the building was added on to seven times.
- St. Thomas Aquinas Catholic School (Dallas) - It has separate facilities for grades Pre-Kindergarten through 2 (lower school) and grades 3-8 (upper school): the upper school is in Wilshire Heights, while the lower school is in Caruth Terrace. It opened as Sacred Heart School #2 in 1947. The Monsignor John T. Gulczynski Early Childhood Center, previously the First Community Church, was acquired by St. Thomas Aquinas in 2005. As of 2020 the lower school has 351 students. In 2011 the church took possession of 2.68 acres (1.08 ha) of land adjacent to the upper school. Aquinas is a 2012 National Blue Ribbon School.

== Preschools ==
- Angel Creek Preschool (Coppell) - Within St. Ann Catholic Church
- Ark Adventure Preschool (Plano) - Within St. Elizabeth Ann Seton Catholic Church
- Caring Little Friends of St. Francis Preschool (Frisco) - Within St. Francis of Assisi Catholic Church
- Gabriel's Little Angels Preschool (McKinney) - Within St. Gabriel the Archangel Catholic Church
- Little Disciples Early Learning Program (Richardson) - Within St. Joseph Catholic Church
- Little Saints and Scholars Preschool (Wylie) - Within St. Anthony Catholic Church
- St. Pius X Early Care and Education Center (Mesquite) - Separated from the main St. Pius X School
- Sunshine and Rainbows Early Learning Center (Allen) - Within St. Jude Catholic Church
