= Mirus Academy =

Coordinates: 29.7967°N 95.8221°W

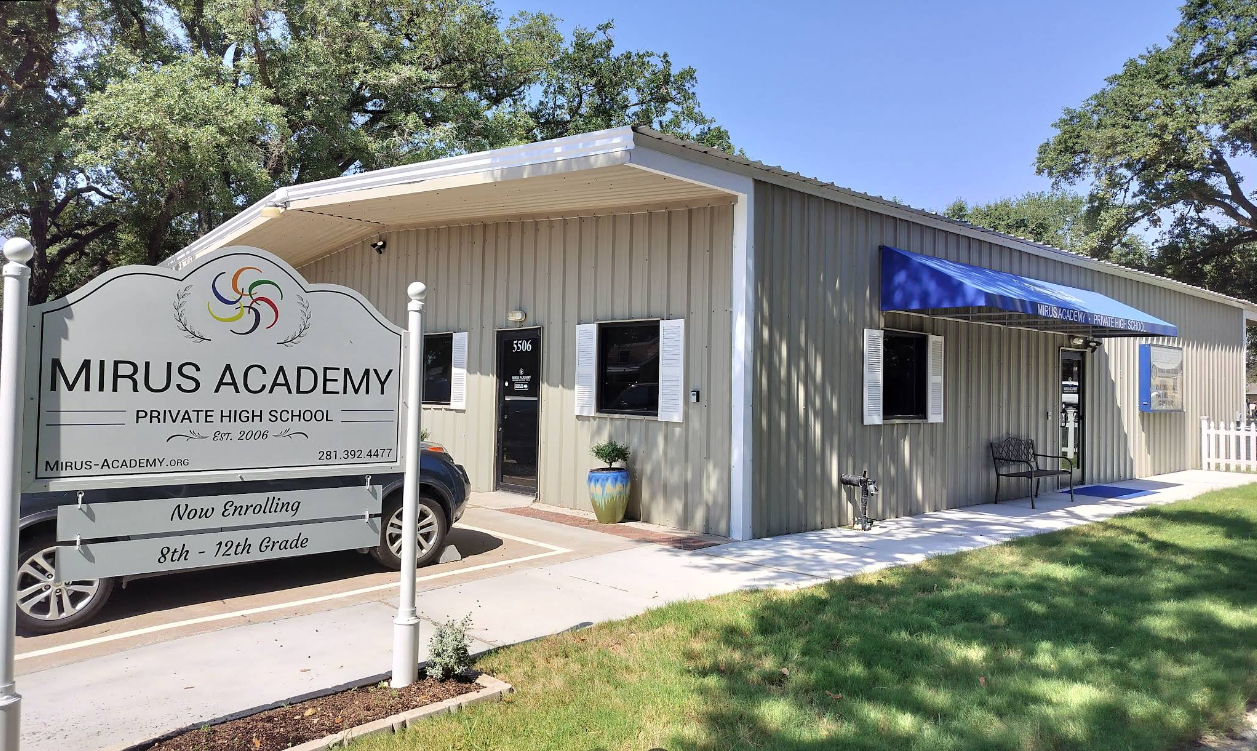

Location
- 5506 3rd Street Katy, TX 77493

Information
- Type: Independent
- Motto: Curiosity, Creativity, Courage, Compassion, Commitment, & Citizenship
- Opened: 2006
- Head of school: Laura Hogan
- Grades: 8th-12th
- Website: mirus-academy.org

Mirus Academy is a private school high school located in Katy, Texas in the United States of America. The school serves the City of Katy, Texas and Greater Houston area.

== Academics ==
Mirus Academy provides a college-preparatory academic program within the framework of small classes and flexible scheduling. High school graduation requires completion of a 26-credit curriculum that includes 4 credits of English, 4 credits of mathematics, 4 credits of science, 4 credits of social studies, 2 credits of foreign language, 1 credit of fine arts, and 8 credits of elective courses. Honors-level and Advanced Placement courses are available. Following graduation, 70% of Mirus Academy graduates enroll in a four-year university, 20% enroll in a two-year community college, and 10% pursue non-college options.

Class sizes are limited by design, with a 7:1 student-to-teacher ratio. Grade levels are determined by age as of September 1; however, students are placed in classes by ability rather than age, so classrooms are mixed-age and able to accommodate students with intellectual giftedness. Admission to the school is selective, and applicants with disciplinary or academic problems are excluded.

== School Schedule ==
Mirus Academy's school hours are 9:00 am to 3:30 pm, Monday through Thursday, and 9:00 am to 1:30 pm on Fridays. An optional 3:30 pm – 5:00 pm class period is also available. While most Mirus students follow a traditional five-day school schedule, a flexible short-week schedule is available, allowing students to pursue activities that overlap with traditional school hours, such as high-level athletic or artistic competitions.

== School History ==
Mirus Academy started as a homeschooling center in the Greater Katy, Texas Area. In 2010, the homeschooling center closed, and the program transitioned into a private school called Mirus Academy. The school was accredited in 2017 by the National Association of Private Schools.

== See also ==
- List of private schools in Texas
- Katy, Texas
