= List of schools in the Roman Catholic Archdiocese of Galveston–Houston =

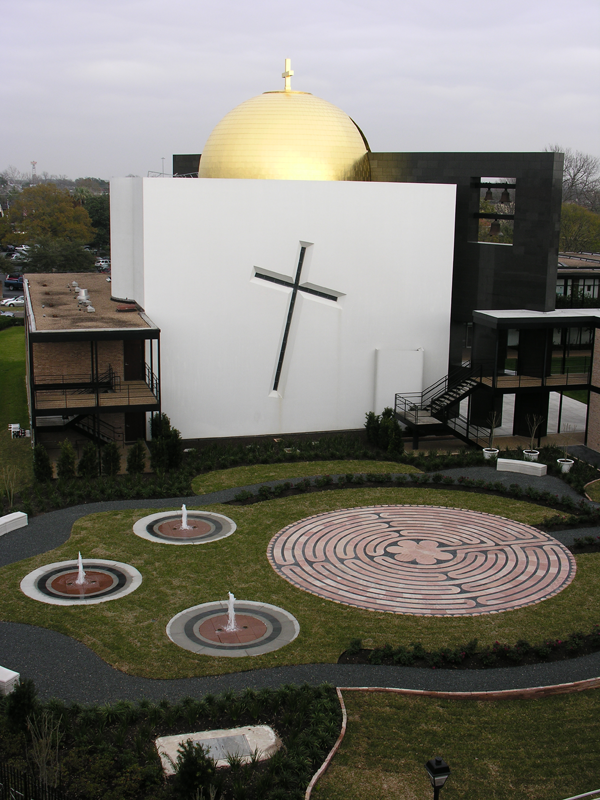
Chapel of St. Basil at University of St. Thomas

The Roman Catholic Archdiocese of Galveston–Houston manages and oversees several Catholic schools within its area.

== Tertiary education ==
Universities:

- Our Lady of the Lake University (Houston campus)
- St. Mary's Seminary (Houston)
- University of St. Thomas (Houston)

== Primary and secondary education ==
=== K-12 schools ===
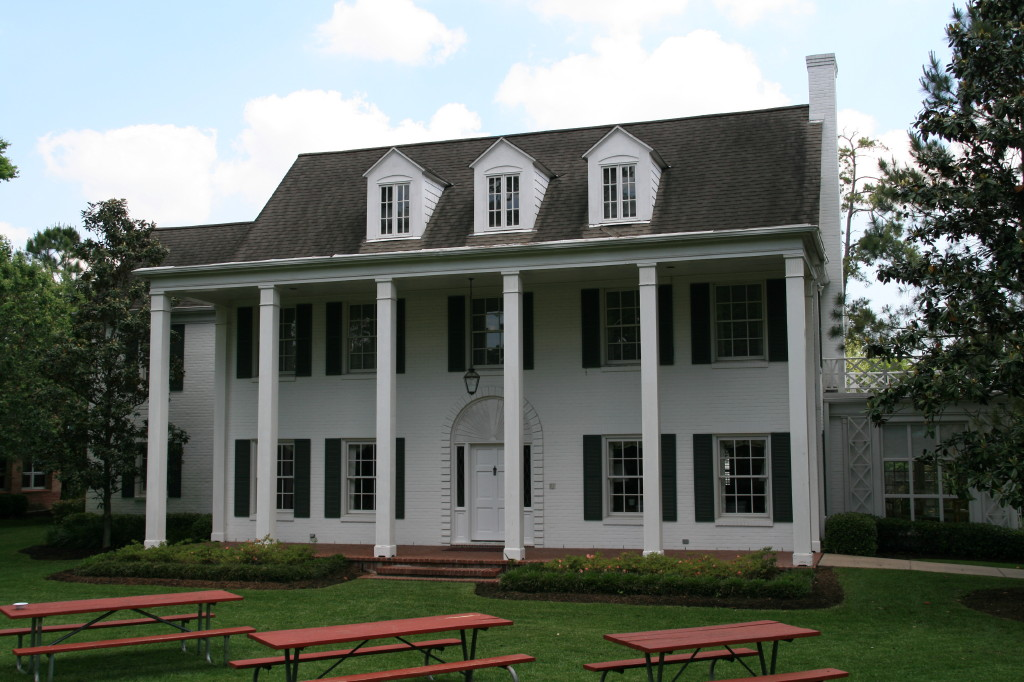
Duchesne Academy

- Duchesne Academy (Houston, girls only)

=== Secondary schools ===
==== High schools (9-12) ====
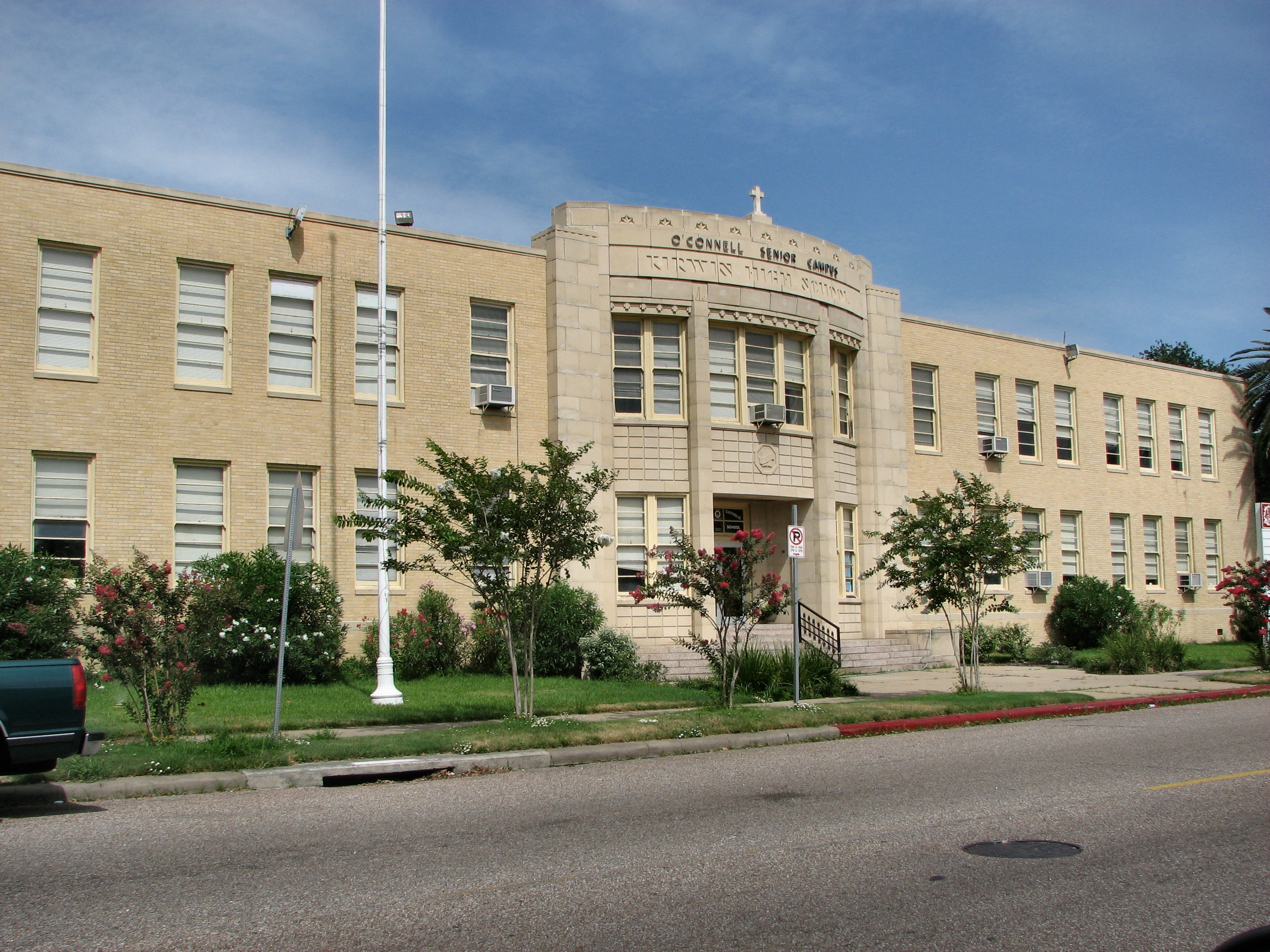
O'Connell College Preparatory School

- Cristo Rey Jesuit College Preparatory of Houston
- Frassati Catholic High School (Harris County, near the Spring CDP and with a Spring postal address)
- Incarnate Word Academy (Houston, girls only)
- O'Connell College Preparatory School (Galveston)
- Saint John XXIII High School (unincorporated Harris County, Katy address)
- Saint Agnes Academy (Houston, girls only)
- St. Pius X High School (Houston)
- St. Thomas High School (Houston, boys only)
- Strake Jesuit College Preparatory (Houston, boys only)

=== PK-9 schools ===
- St. Catherine's Montessori School (Houston)

=== K-8 schools ===
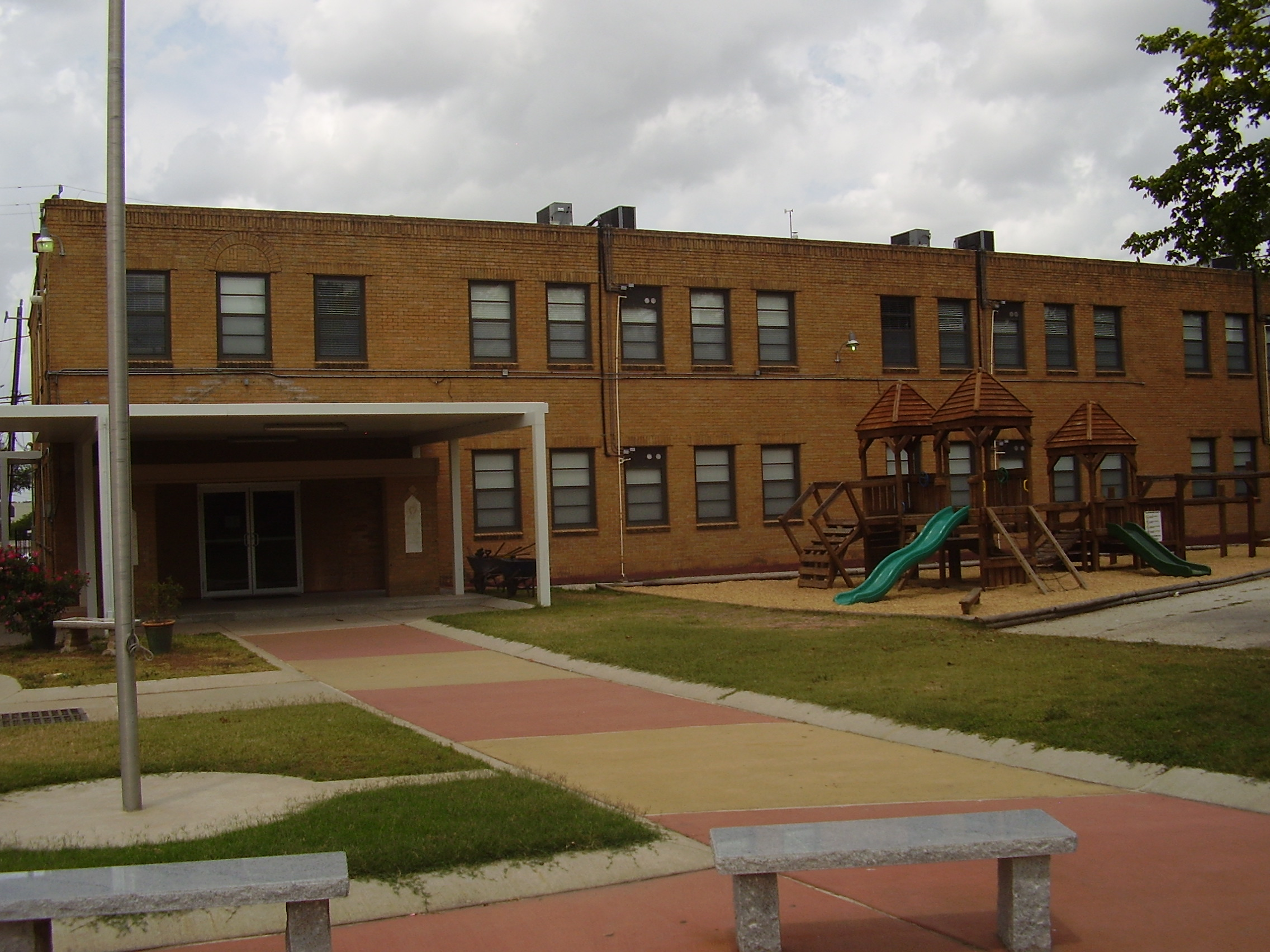
Our Lady of Guadalupe School

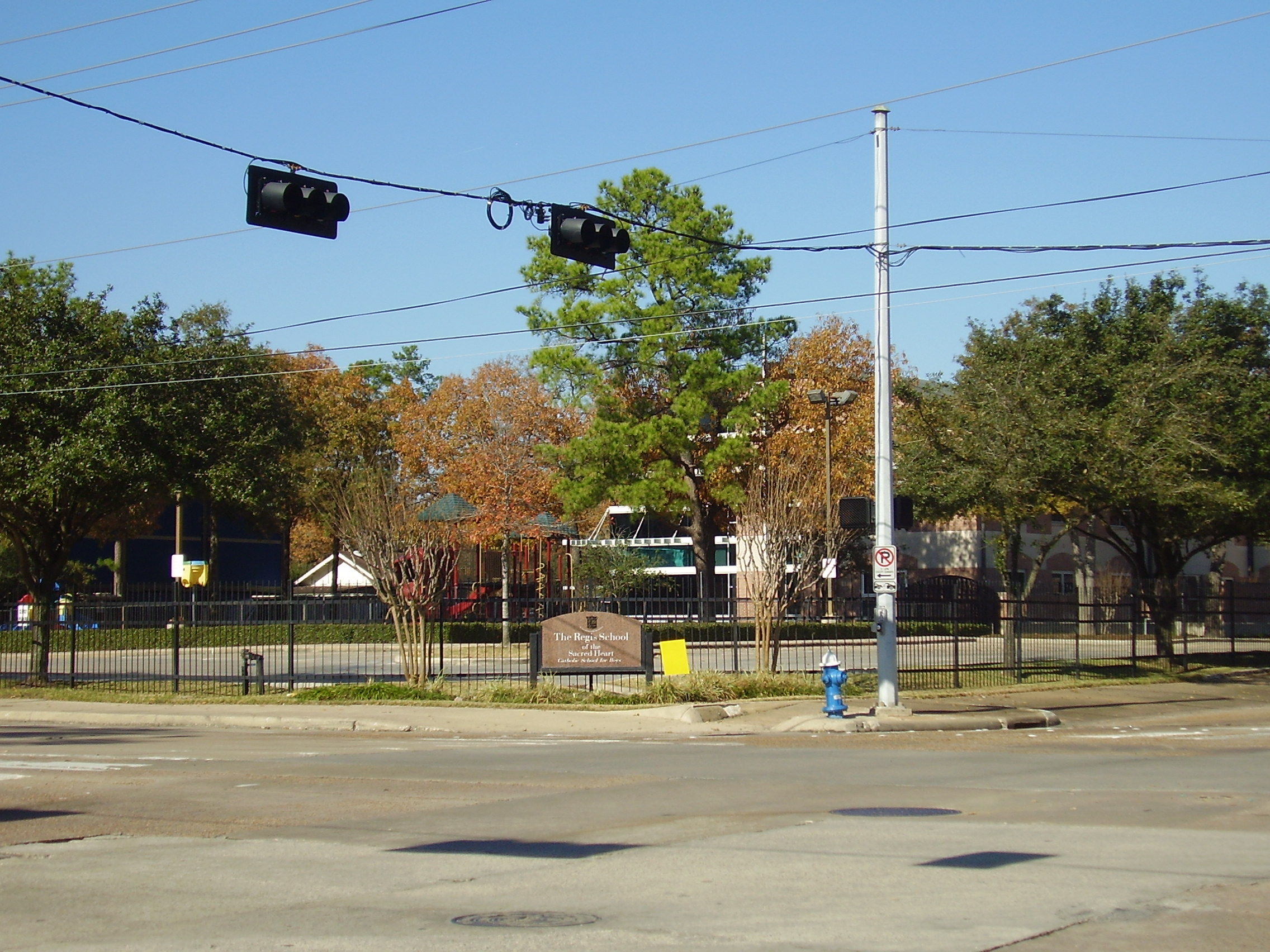
The Regis School of the Sacred Heart

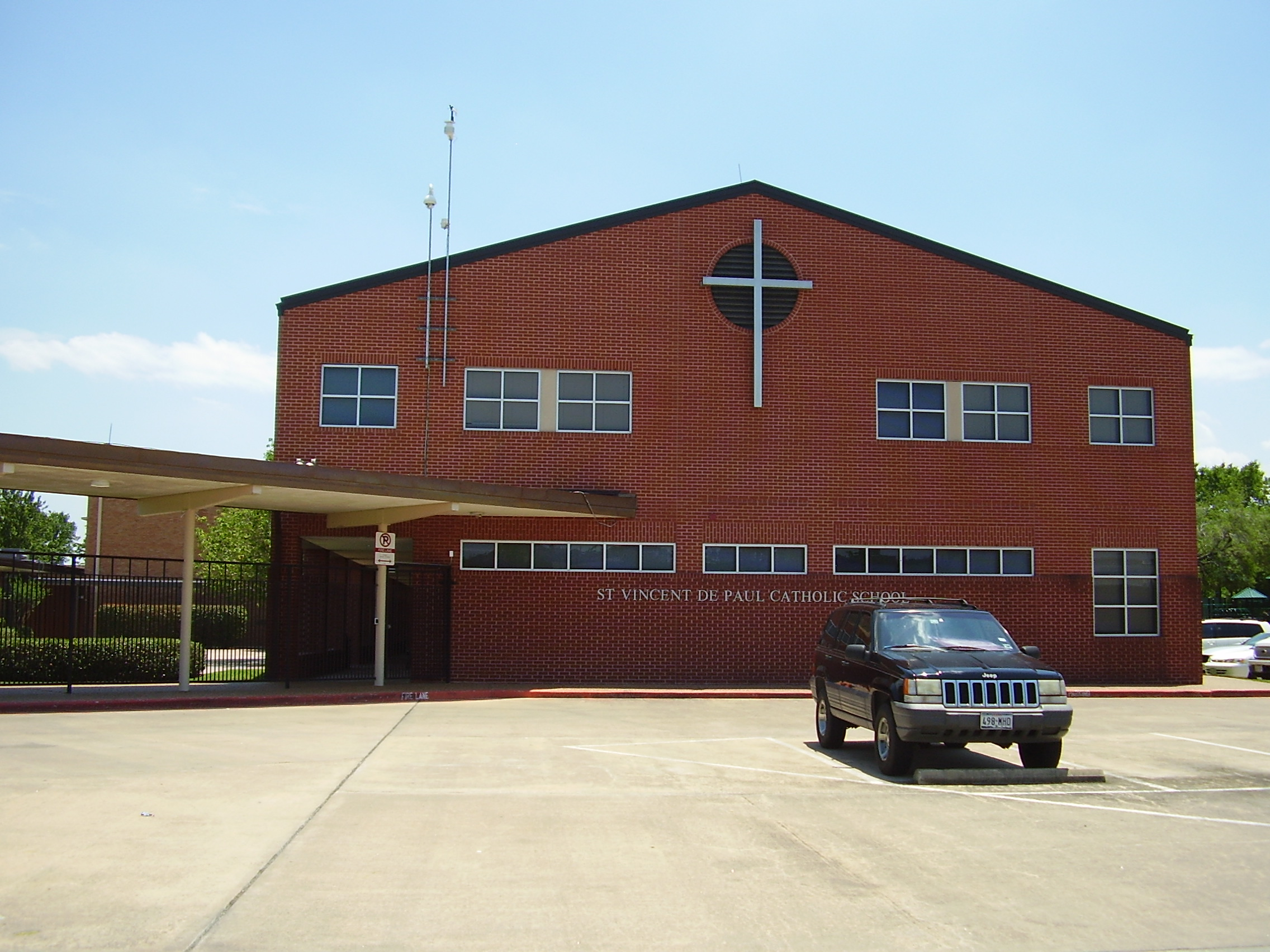
St. Vincent de Paul Catholic School

- Assumption Catholic School
- Christ the Redeemer Catholic School (Cypress)
- Corpus Christi School (Houston) - It is in the Westwood subdivision. Circa 2002 it had 137 students. From 2011 to 2012 enrollment grew by 7%, with 215 students to be enrolled in the 2012–2013 school year. By 2012 the school could not enroll all prospective students in each grade, with the filled-to-capacity grades having wait lists. Communities enrolling students at Corpus Christi include, aside from Westwood, Bellaire, Meyerland, Southside Place, West University Place, Willowbend, and the Texas Medical Center area.
- Epiphany of Our Lord Catholic School (Harris County)
  - Sponsored by Epiphany of Our Lord Church, this is the first Catholic grade school in Greater Katy. The 74,000-square-foot (6,900 m^{2}) campus, a part of the church property, included 26,000 square feet (2,400 m^{2}) of existing church property and 48,000 square feet (4,500 m^{2}) of new footage. Its two-story school building, with each grade level having three classrooms, had a cost of $12 million. The campus has a playground, a library, a cafeteria, and a music room. The proposed yearly tuition was $8,000. The school administration used a $5 million capital campaign to raise funds for the construction. Construction began in June 2017. The school began accepting applications in March 2018 and plans to open in fall 2018.
- Holy Family Catholic School (Galveston)
- Holy Ghost School (Houston) - It is in the Gulfton area, one city block from Bellaire. In 2005, after Hurricane Katrina hit New Orleans, the school began serving an additional number of students that was similar to the number it had originally enrolled. From the 2011–2012 to 2012–2013 school years enrollment was projected to increase by 16%.
- Holy Rosary Catholic School (Rosenberg)
- John Paul II School (Houston)
- Our Lady of Fatima School (Galena Park, Texas)
- Our Lady of Fatima Catholic School (Texas City, Texas)
- Our Lady of Guadalupe School (Houston)
- Holy Rosary Catholic School, Galveston, TX (Holy Rosary Catholic School, Galveston, Texas - Founders)
- Our Lady Queen of Peace School (Richwood)
- The Regis School of the Sacred Heart (Houston, boys only)
- Resurrection School (Houston) - in Denver Harbor; in summer 1937 its first building was built From the 2011–2012 to 2012–2013 school years enrollment was projected to increase by 55%.
- Sacred Heart School (Conroe)
- Sacred Heart School (unincorporated Harris County, Crosby address)
- St. Ambrose School (Houston)
- St. Anne Catholic School (Houston)
- St. Anne School (Tomball)
  - St. Anne Catholic, established in 1984, originally held its classes at St. Anne Church; that year it had 16 Kindergarten students and 13 first grade students. It had had 380 students in 2015. That year Joseph Noonan became the principal.
- St. Anthony of Padua Catholic School (The Woodlands)
- St. Augustine School (Houston)
- St. Cecilia School (Hedwig Village)
- St. Christopher School (Houston)
- St. Clare of Assisi Catholic School PK3-8 (Houston)
- St. Edward School (unincorporated Harris County, Spring address)
  - It is on a 15-acre (6.1 ha) plot of land. As of May 2016 it had 351 students.
- St. Elizabeth Ann Seton School (Houston)
- St. Francis de Sales Catholic School (Houston) PK3-8
  - Ground breaking ceremonies for St. Francis de Sales Catholic School were held on September 19, 1963, one year after the parish was established by the Diocese. On September 8, 1964, the school opened its doors to 463 students in grades 1–6. In April 1967 the school received its first accreditation by the Texas Education Agency, the entity responsible for school accreditations at the time. In 2006 the school had about 500 students.
- St. Helen School (Pearland)
  - Located on the grounds of St. Helen Catholic Church, it previously had 25,000 square feet (2,300 m^{2}) of space, but by 2019 its space increased to 75,000 square feet (7,000 m^{2}) due to an expansion. As of 2019 it had 400 students.
- St. Jerome School (Houston)
- St. Laurence School (Sugar Land)
- St. Martha School (Houston (Kingwood address))
- St. Mary Catholic School (League City)
- St. Michael School (Houston) - It is in proximity to the Houston Galleria. In 2012 there were plans for a new 70,000-square-foot (6,500 m^{2}) complex, with students encouraged to donate to the project. Construction was to last from February 2012 to prior to fall 2013.
- St. Rose of Lima School (Houston)
  - It is in the Oak Forest area. In 2014 John Nova Lomax of Houstonia wrote that it "was the neighborhood focal point, and still is, some say."
- St. Theresa School (Houston, opened 1947)
- St. Theresa School (Sugar Land, opened 2008) The city government approved the permit for the school building in 2007. The school building was dedicated on August 13, 2009.
- St. Thomas More School (Houston)
- St. Vincent de Paul School (Houston, opened September 1943)
  - Principal Mary Getschow resigned in 2004.
- True Cross Catholic School (Dickinson, opened 1946)

=== Primary schools ===
PK-6 schools

- Our Lady of Lourdes School (Hitchcock)
- St. Joseph School (Baytown)

K-6 schools

- Our Lady of Fatima School (Galena Park)
- St. Mary Magdalene School (Humble)

K-5

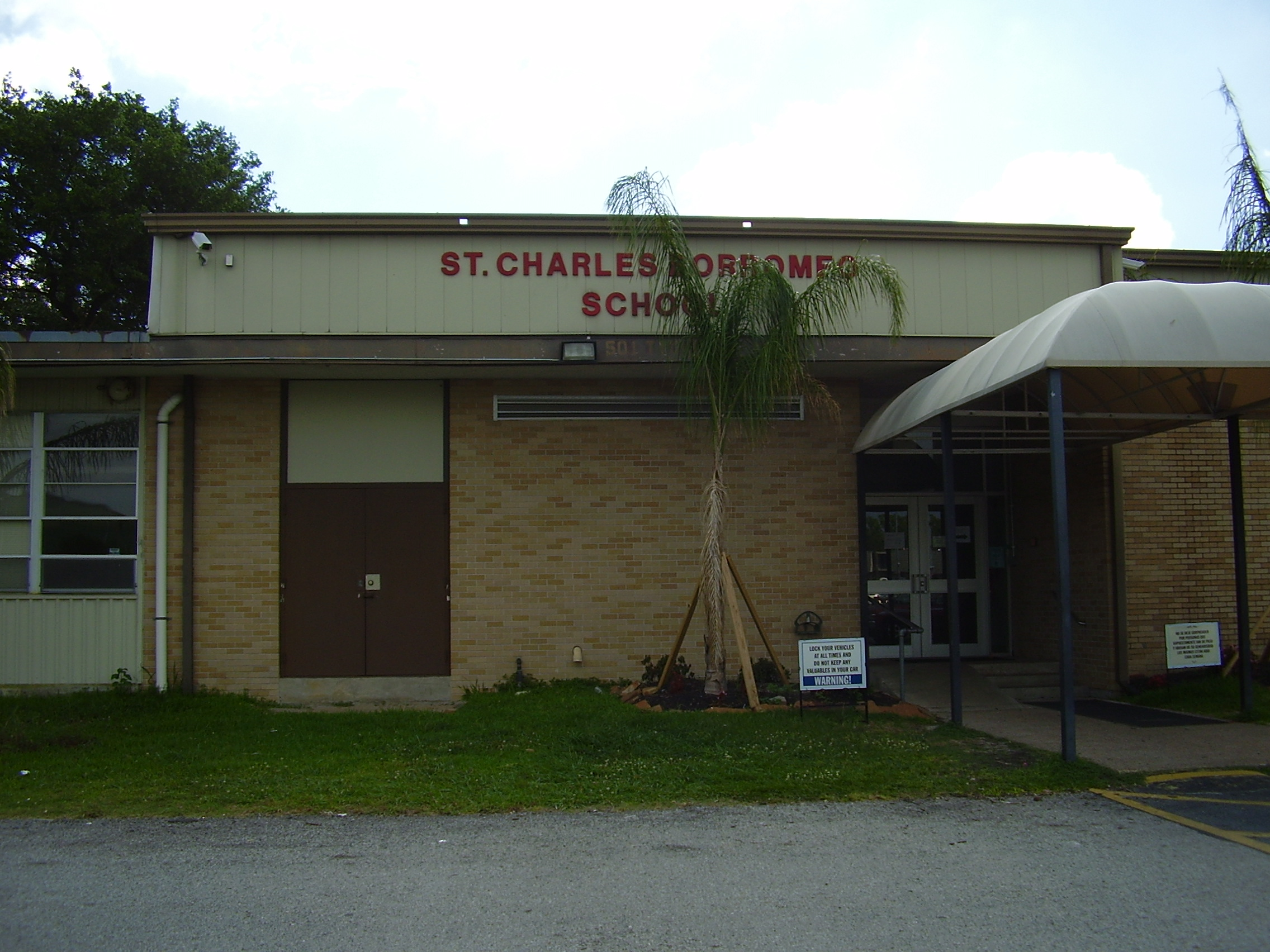
St. Charles Borromeo School, Houston

- St. Mary of the Purification School (Houston)

== Other facilities ==
- School of Environmental Education (Plantersville)

== Former schools ==
In 2020 the archdiocese closed four schools due to complications from the COVID-19 pandemic, along with reduced funds from donation programs and a decreased number of students. Each school had a building utilization of about 40% and enrollment below 100; the four combined had 257 students.

=== Universities ===
- St. Mary's University (Galveston, Texas) - First Catholic seminary and college in Texas. Founded in 1855. The university closed in 1922 and its charter transferred to St. Mary's Seminary in La Porte.

=== Former high schools ===
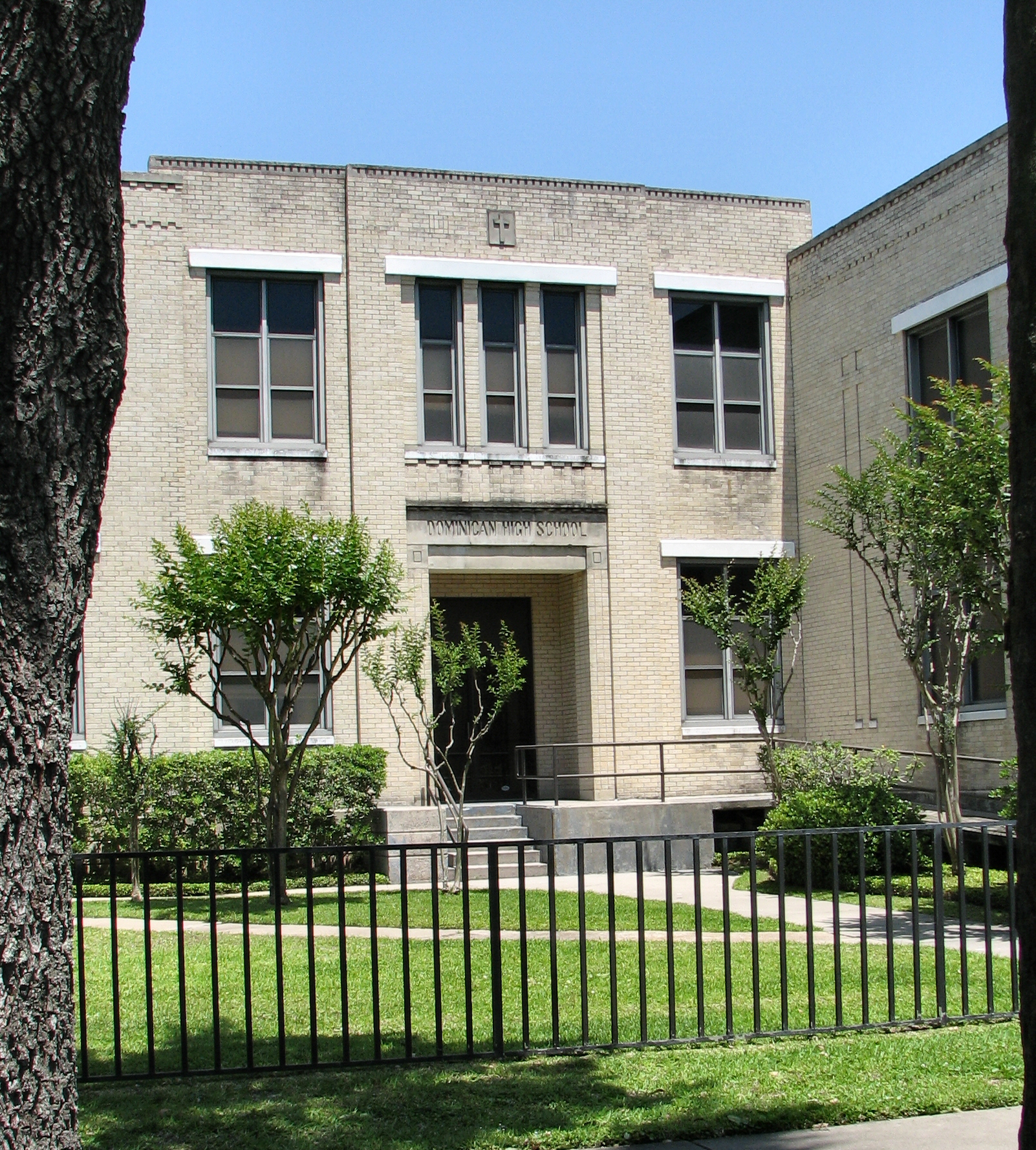
Dominican High School (former building)

- Dominican High School (girls, Galveston) - consolidated in 1968; O'Connell Consolidated High School
- St. Euphrasia High School (Houston) - closed 1967
- Kirwin High School (boys, Galveston) - consolidated in 1968; O'Connell Consolidated High School
- Marian Christian High School and the Congregation of the Sisters of the Incarnate Word and Blessed Sacrament (Bellaire) - closed 1978
- Mount Carmel High School (Houston) (closed in 2008)
- St. Nicholas High School (Houston) - closed 1967
- O'Connell Consolidated High School (Galveston) - closed 2004 and became O'Connell College Preparatory School
- Ursuline Academy (girls, Galveston) - consolidated in 1968; O'Connell Consolidated High School

=== Former K-8 schools ===
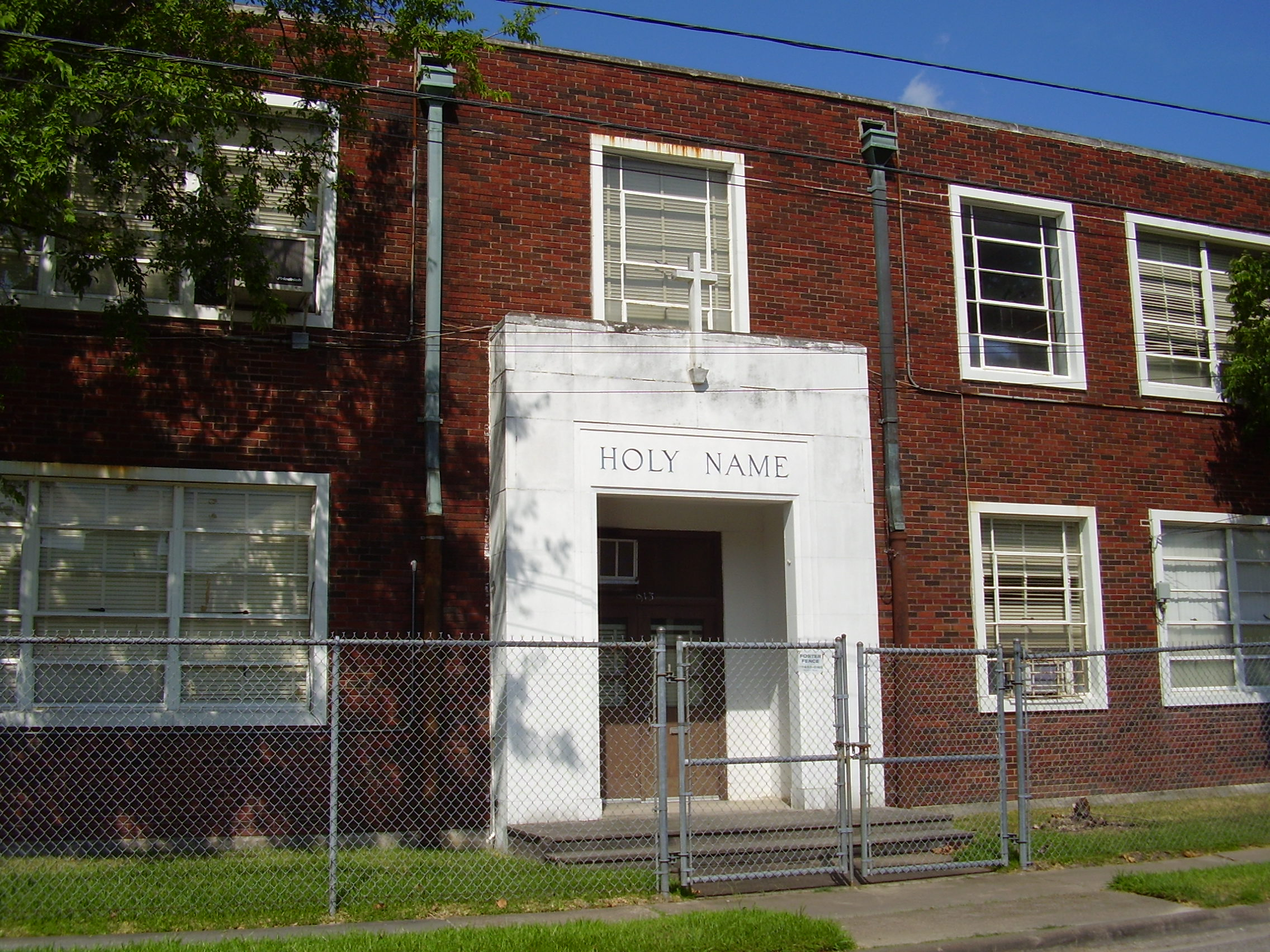
Holy Name School

- Holy Name School (Houston) (closed in spring 2009)
- Holy Rosary Catholic School (Midtown Houston) - opened circa 1913 and closed in 1963. The establishment of freeways caused suburbanization, and therefore population loss, to occur in the area. Initially the parish kept the school building in hopes that the school would be re-established, but it was to be demolished in 2003 so a parish hall could be built there. Tom Bass and Gale Storm were alumni.
- Northwoods Catholic School (unincorporated Harris County, Spring address) (closed)
- Our Mother of Mercy School (Houston) (closed in spring 2009) - Merged with St. Francis of Assisi School
- Our Lady of Mount Carmel Catholic School (Houston) - It was about 3 miles (4.8 km) from Hobby Airport. It opened in 1954, and closed in 2020.
- St. Francis of Assisi Catholic School (Houston) - In Kashmere Gardens, it was established in 1955, and closed 2020. Parent Sharita Palmer Mayo, as paraphrased by Giulia McDonnell Nieto del Rio of The New York Times, stated that the school "had been severely damaged by Hurricane Harvey in 2017, but community members had worked hard to support rebuilding efforts and [reopen]"; the archdiocese attributed the closure to COVID-19.
- St.Pius V Catholic School (Pasadena) - Opened in 1947, and closed 2020
- St. Peter the Apostle - closed 2019 - in the Third Ward; before its closure was a PreK-8 school; peak enrollment was about 600 students in the 1960s Prior to 2009 St. Peter was a middle school with grades 6–8; that year St. Philip Neri School merged into St. Peter, making it PK-8. From 2014 to 2019 enrollment declined by 70%. In 2019 St. Peter the Apostle had 33 students; in May 2019 the Archdiocese announced that it was going to close. Debra Haney, the superintendent of schools of the Galveston-Houston diocese, stated that the enrollment decreased due to the proliferation of charter schools.
- Queen of Peace Catholic School (East End, Houston) - opened on September 8, 1947 in a four classroom building. The official website of the school stated that the school being shuttered was a possibility in the 1980s as the number of students fell significantly. It closed in 2020.

==== Northwoods Catholic School ====
Northwoods Catholic School, a private Catholic school in the Spring area, was located off of the intersection of Farm to Market Road 2920 and Gosling Road, in a 51-acre (21 ha) campus. It used a curriculum from the Legionaries of Christ. Established circa 1999, it was not affiliated with the archdiocese. It initially had 13 students, and was in a facility in the Ponderosa Forest neighborhood, an apartment clubhouse temporarily used as a school.

In 2003 it had 200 students. By that year its permanent facility opened; it had a price tag of $6 million. In 2004 it had 250 students. In 2005 academic dean Susan Horne became the principal, and the previous principal, Joe Noonan, became Northwood's executive director. In 2010 it had about 230 students, with about 40% of them originating from The Woodlands. The building's first floor had 44,000 square feet (4,100 m^{2}) of space. Its 22,000-square-foot (2,000 m^{2}) second floor, with offices, computer and science labs, and a library, was blessed on August 13, 2010 and opened on August 18 of that year. It was built in three months.

In the 2015–2016 school year, the school's final year of operation, it had 268 students; it was projected to have 160 students for the following school year. The school announced on May 4, 2016 that it was closing, and a shrinking budget and declining enrollment were cited as reasons. It closed on June 30, 2016. An area developer who was buying land from the school got into a legal dispute with the owner of the land and with a Catholic priest.

=== Former junior high schools ===
- O'Connell Junior High School
- Seton Junior High, Houston (closed 2009)

=== Former primary schools ===
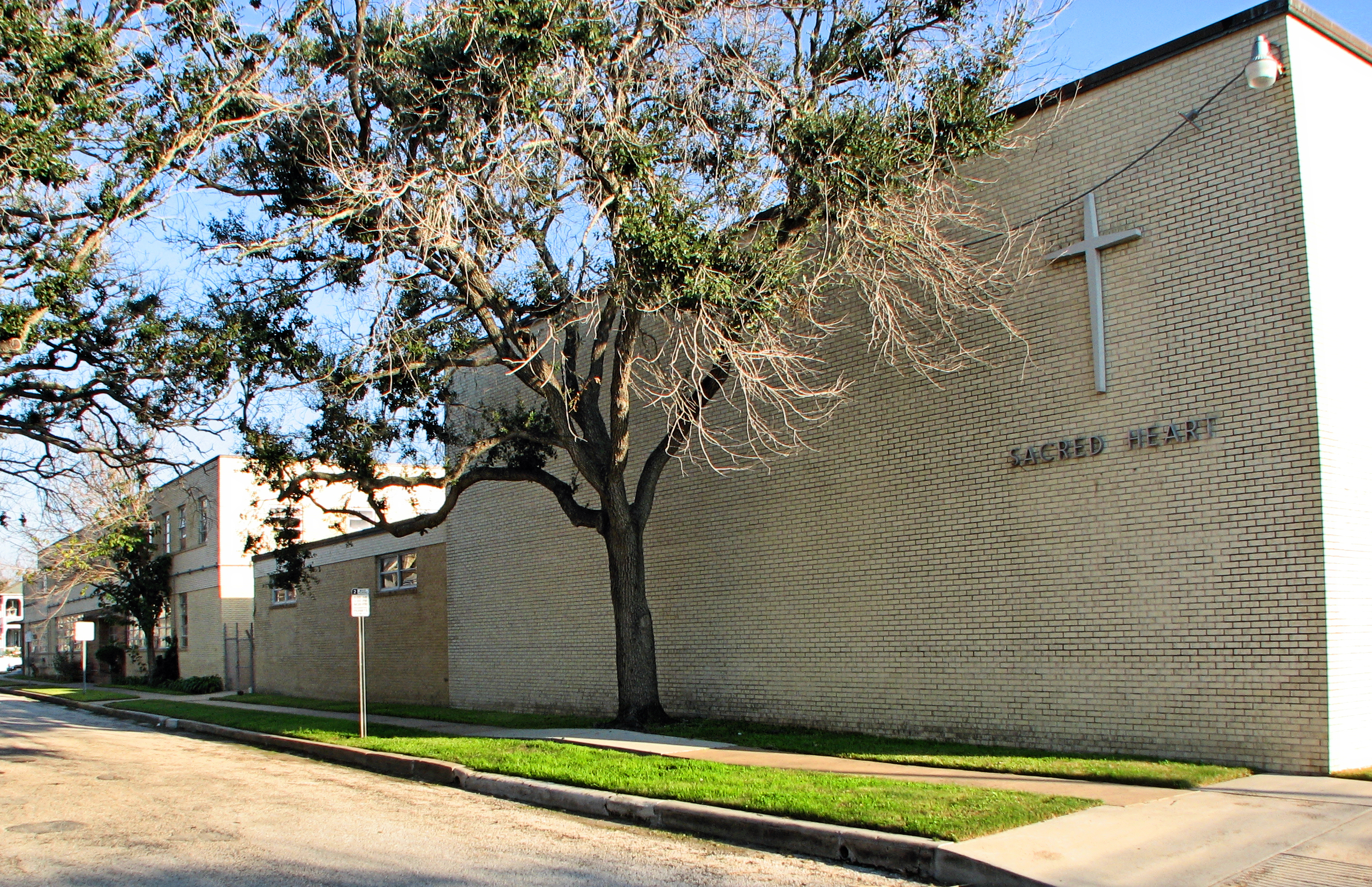
Sacred Heart School in Galveston

- All Saints School (Houston) (closed 1986)
- Blessed Sacrament School (Houston) (closed 1991)
- St. Charles Borromeo School (Houston) (Spring 2009) - Merged with Seton Junior High School, forming Assumption Catholic School After Hurricane Ike in 2008 damaged the Borromeo building, students began sharing space with Seton, which at the time was not yet built to accommodate younger students.
- Christ the King School (Houston, PreK-2)
- Dominican Grade School (girls, Galveston) - consolidated into Galveston Catholic School
- Holy Rosary School (Galveston) (closed 1979)
- Immaculate Conception School (Houston) (closed 1969)
- Immaculate Heart of Mary School
- St. Joseph School (Houston) (closed 1967)
- Our Lady of Guadalupe School (Galveston, closed 1986) - consolidated into Galveston Catholic School
- St. Nicholas School (Houston) (closed 1971)
- St. Patrick Grade School (Galveston, 1881–1986) - consolidated into Galveston Catholic School
- St. Philip Neri School (Houston) (Spring 2009) - It was in proximity to South Park and Sunnyside. It merged with St. Peter the Apostle Middle School.
- Sacred Heart School (Galveston)
- St. Mary's Catholic School - consolidated into Galveston Catholic School

== See also ==
- Catholic schools in the United States
- Roman Catholic Archdiocese of Galveston–Houston
- Catholicism
