= J. Fred Duckett =

American sports journalist (1933–2007)

- Born: May 4, 1933; Houston, Texas, United States
- Died: June 25, 2007 (aged 74); Houston, Texas

J. Fred Duckett (May 4, 1933 – June 25, 2007) was an American sports journalist and writer.

== Life and career ==
He was born in Houston, Texas, the eldest son of Harry and Dorothy (Boettcher) Duckett.

He went to Rice University in the 1950s after having attended Lamar High School to receive his B.A. in history. There he played both football and track under Coach Jess Neely as a member of the Owls' scout team. During his junior season he had an injury and he began to work with Bill Whitmore, who was the Owl's sports information director. After graduating from Rice University in 1955 he went to the University of Texas for his master's degree. After his education he went to study in the Netherlands for one year as a Fulbright scholar.

In 1962 he became the PA voice for the Houston Colt .45s, later to become the Houston Astros in 1965. He was also the public address announcer for Rice University sporting events. He announced many games over the years and he became well known for his way of announcing "Jose Cruuuuuuz." "[Duckett] is the one to come out with the way they announced my name." Jose Cruz commented. Once Duckett said: "Strangers are always telling me, 'I've heard that voice. I just don't know where." In 1992 he left the Astros.

He officiated, coached and announced for Track and Field. He worked with the U.S. Olympic Committee during three Olympic games, in 1976, 1984 and 1988. He served on the board of the U.S. Olympic festival when that was held in Houston.

For many years Duckett and his wife served as host family for foreign graduate students at Rice University. He was an active member of the Rice University "R" association and of the Holland Club of Houston.

Duckett taught at St. John's School in Houston, after graduate school, but he was unable to live off the money and therefore became an insurance salesman. When he heard there was a part-time History teaching job available at the Awty International School he immediately accepted. He taught there for 17 years until his death.

He was married to Baudine W. Duckett, who had a daughter, Petra Cochran, from a previous marriage whom Duckett adopted.

== Illness ==
Duckett started missing class due to his leukemia. In June 2007 he entered Methodist Hospital, in his native city of Houston, where he died, aged 74. During the Grand Opening of the new athletics facility at Awty, a moment of silence was held for the man who had been track coach at Awty for several years.

He was predeceased by his wife who died in January 2007.
