= List of schools in the Roman Catholic Diocese of El Paso =

This is a list of schools in the Roman Catholic Diocese of El Paso.

== K-12 schools ==
- Loretto Academy, El Paso (non-diocesan)

== High schools ==
- Cathedral High School, El Paso
- Father Yermo High School, El Paso (non-diocesan)

== Elementary schools ==
- Most Holy Trinity Catholic School
- St. Joseph Catholic School
- St. Matthew Catholic School
- St. Patrick Catholic School
- St. Raphael Catholic School

Non-Diocesan

- Father Yermo Catholic Elementary School

Closed

- St. Pius X Catholic School (Spanish: Escuela Católica San Pio X) - Closed in 2026. The number of students at the school had declined. At the time the school's yearly budget was at a deficit exceeding $300,000. When the closure was announced in June 2026, the closure was effective immediately.
