= Awty International School =

The Awty International School

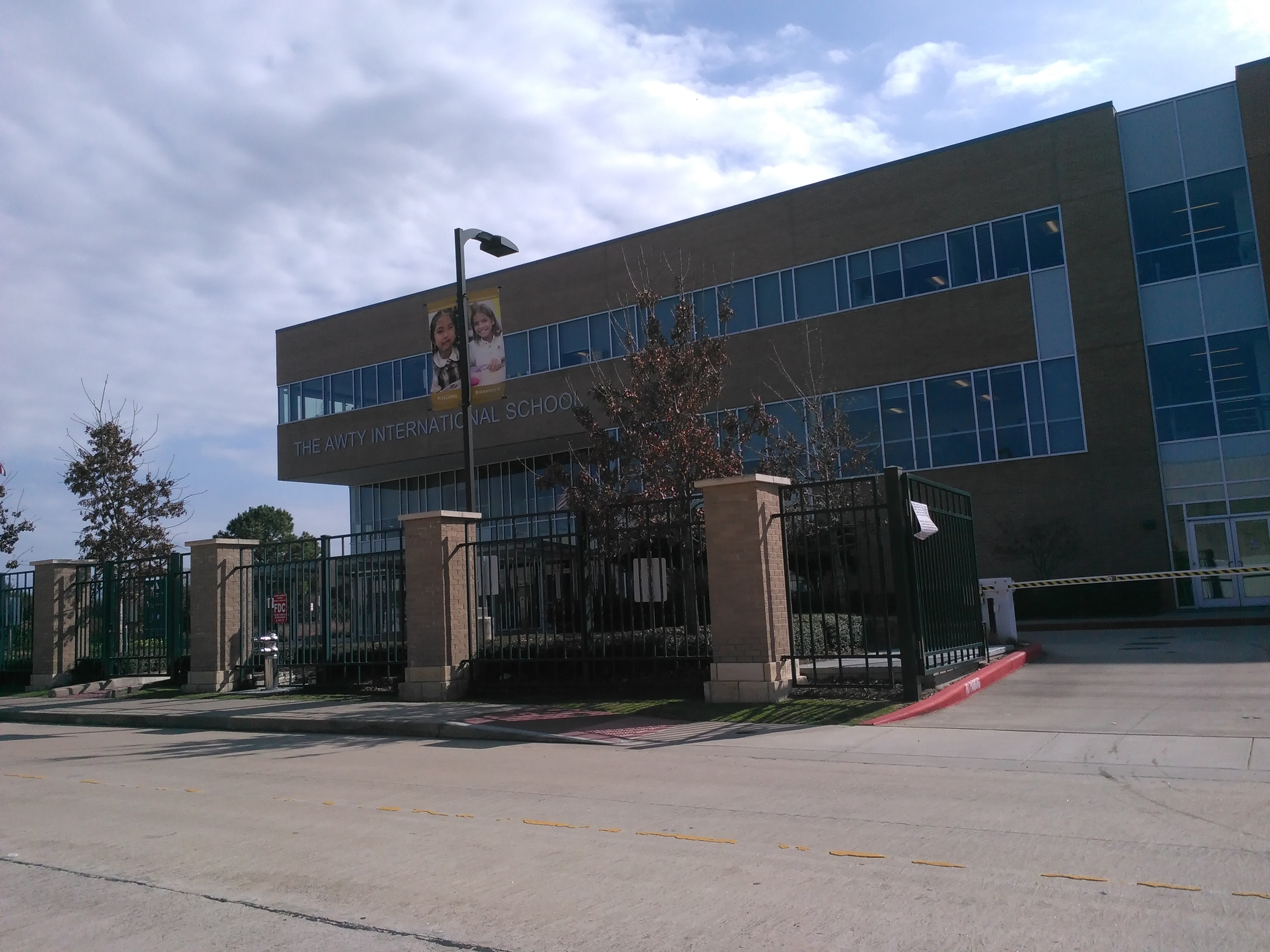
- Campus

Location
- 7455 Awty School Lane; Houston, Texas; United States
- 29.786°N 95.460°W

Information
- Type: Independent, International School
- Motto: An International School for an International World
- Established: 1956
- Founder: Kathleen Awty
- Head of School: Heather Beck
- Faculty: 244
- Enrollment: 1,754 (2022)
- Campus: Urban
- Colors: Green and gold
- Mascot: Ram
- Newspaper: RAMPAGE
- Yearbook: Double Exposure
- Website: www.awty.org

The Awty International School is a private school located in Spring Branch, western Houston, Texas, United States. Founded in 1956, Awty allows its students to receive the International Baccalaureate or the French Baccalauréat, and is fully accredited by the French Ministry of Education, making it an overseas school for French national students in the Houston area. It has age three to 12th grade students. Awty is the largest international school in the United States and the largest private day school in Houston. It is part of the Agency for French Education Abroad (AEFE) network of schools for French national students abroad.

== History ==
Awty opened at 3736 Westheimer Road on September 10, 1956. Originally a pre-school, it was founded by Kathleen "Kay" Awty. The school initially had 27 students at the kindergarten and prekindergarten levels.

The school moved to 1615 Garretson Street in 1960. By 1970, It served grades preschool through sixth. By that same year there were 250 students enrolled. The upper school division opened in 1975, and in 1976 four female students graduated from the high school, forming the first graduating class. In 1979, Awty merged with the French School of Houston and began offering a bilingual program. That year, the school moved to its current campus.

In 1984 the school received its current name, the Awty International School. A preschool facility opened in 1990. Kay Awty died in 1996.

On the school's 50th anniversary in 2006, a $5 million athletic complex including a 1,400-seat stadium, 85 parking spaces, and tennis courts were constructed.

== Affiliations and accreditation ==
Awty is affiliated with the Mission Laïque Française. Agencies accrediting Awty include the International Baccalaureate (IB), the Independent Schools Association of the Southwest (ISAS), the Ministry of National Education of France, and the Ministry of Education, Culture and Science of the Netherlands.

Awty is also affiliated with Agence pour l'enseignement français à l'étranger (AEFE), the Council of International Schools (CIS), the National Association of Independent Schools (NAIS), the Association for the Advancement of International Education (AAIE), the Southwest Preparatory Conference (SPC), Houston Junior Preparatory Conference (HJPC), Houston Area Independent Schools (HAIS), and Texas International Baccalaureate Schools (TIBS).

== Curriculum ==
The school offers the IB Diploma, the French Baccalauréat diploma, and a general high school diploma. As of 2021, Awty is the only school in Greater Houston offering both tracks to the International Baccalaureate and French Baccalauréat diplomas, and the only school in Texas requiring all seniors to take the final exams in one of these two programs. The AEFE accredits Awty.

Preparing students for the global lives they are sure to lead, all students are immersed in the study of a second language. The form of immersion varies depending on the grade level. Students in PK3 through Kindergarten are immersed in either English/French or English/Spanish. In 1st grade through 5th grade, language immersion is with core subjects taught in the primary language of either English, French, or Spanish and specials such as art, gym, and library are taught in the second language, as well as the daily hour-long second language class. Students in 6th grade through 12th grade attend a daily intensive second language class, and have extensive third language options. Languages in addition to English, French, and Spanish often include Arabic, German, Hindi, Japanese, Korean, Mandarin, and Russian. On any given year, Awty typically offers ten different language options.

== Campus ==
The main campus, with 26 acres (11 ha) of land, is in Spring Branch in western Houston. It is in proximity to the intersection of the 610 Loop and Interstate 10, and is northwest of it. The campus buildings together have 120 classrooms.

The Levant Foundation Building, is located near the school's entrance. The Levant Foundation Building and a five-story parking garage were the first phase of a four-phase, $50 million building program of facilities designed by Bailey Architects. The second phase of the project was completed in 2014 with the opening of an elementary building, which includes a computer lab, a media room, an infirmary, two art rooms, and a teacher's lounge and workroom.

Awty historically relied on the use of temporary buildings, and elementary school classes were originally located in the school's original building, "Big Blue." Demolition of "Big Blue" was completed in August, 2014 to make way for the new Student Campus Center.

In 2017, a second 5-acre Early Learning Campus was added nearby for students in PK3/PS, PK4/MS, Kinder/GS, and 1st grade/CP featuring 26 classrooms, dedicated indoor spaces for art, music, dining, after-school program, and technology, as well as a full gym. Outdoors, the facility features two playgrounds, learning gardens, and three decks for class activities.

In June 2021, the school began a multi-phase campus expansion to construct a new 155,000-square-foot Campus Center at the heart of its 15-acre main campus. Designed by architecture firm Lake Flato Architects and built by Harvey Cleary. The building was engineered with climate-resilient features, including deep overhangs, shaded breezeways for natural ventilation, and an expanded stormwater management system utilizing rain gardens. The facility integrates a central dining commons with an open kitchen, a multi-purpose lecture hall, and a modernized library. The design received the 2025 AIA Houston Design Award and the 2026 Texas Society of Architects Design Award.

The Student Center serves as the central hub for the school's Science, Technology, Engineering, Arts, and Math (STEAM) curriculum. The facility incorporates modernized, technology-enhanced science laboratories, academic classrooms, and collaborative breakout spaces designed to support group study and flexible indoor-outdoor instruction.

The Chevron Makerspace provides dedicated workspaces and tools tailored for hands-on, design-thinking projects, robotics, and creative prototyping, complementing the school's formal science and computer tracks.

The former campus on Garrettson Street was west of the 610 Loop, in what is now the Uptown Houston district. It was in proximity to River Oaks and Tanglewood.

== Student body ==
As of 2021, the school's enrollment was over 1,717 students. This makes it the largest international school in the United States and the largest private school in Houston. As of that year the students originated from the United States, France, and 48 other countries. As of 2021 54% are U.S. citizens, 12% are U.S. citizens with multiple citizenship, and 34% are from one or more of 50 other countries. Over 60% are bilingual.

== Transportation ==
As of 2021 the school provides bus services for students to and from the Dairy Ashford area, Greater Katy, the Lakes on Eldridge/Lakes on Eldridge North/Twin Lakes area, Memorial, Shadowbriar, Sugar Land, and the Town and Country Mall area in Spring Branch.

== Athletics ==
In 2019-2020, The Awty International School joined the Southwest Preparatory Conference (SPC) and Houston Junior Preparatory Conference (HJPC).

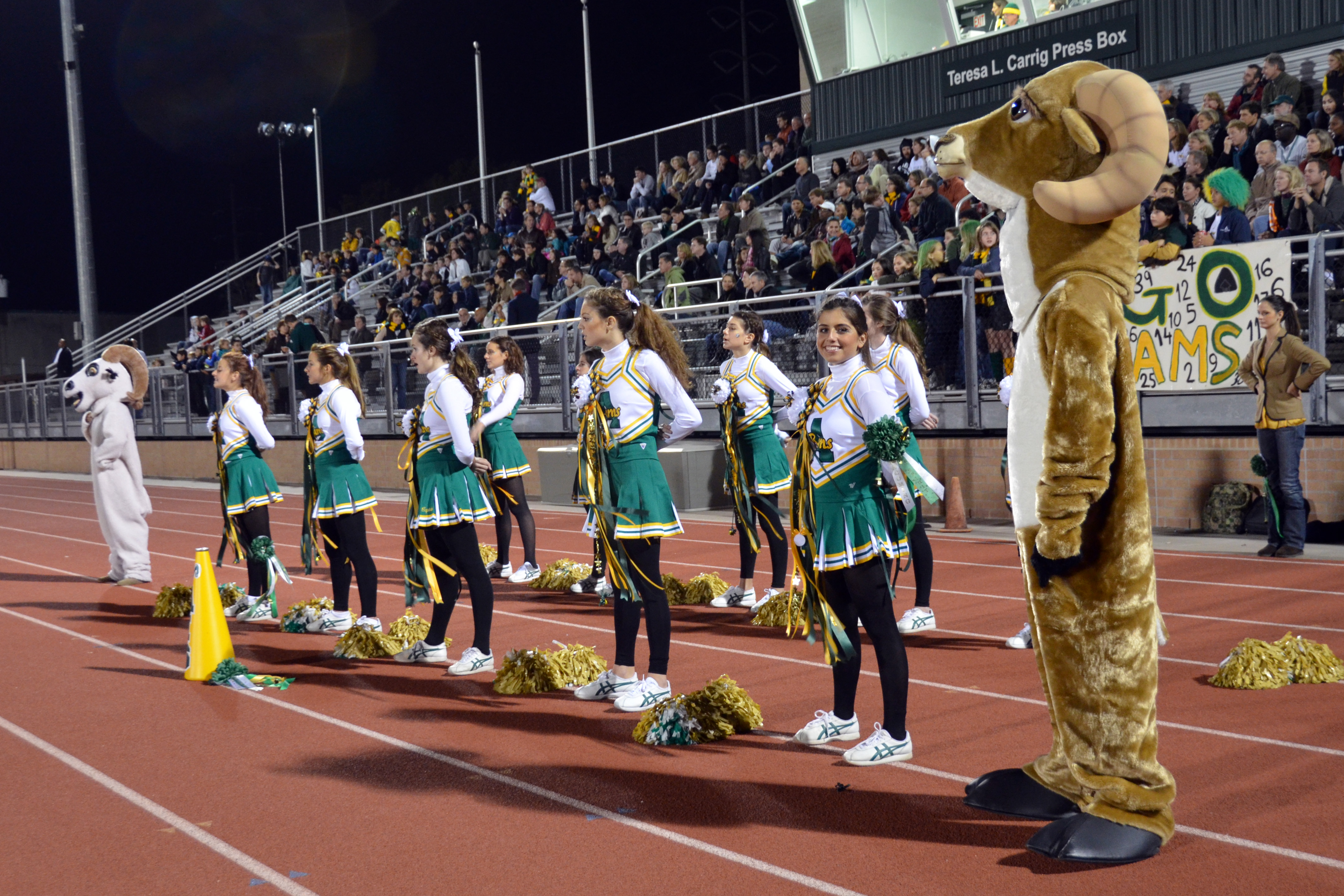
Cheerleaders with the Awty mascot

The athletic campus, Awty Field, is located at 1255 North Post Oak, adjacent to the main campus. Its opening ceremony was held on April 22, 2008. The athletic compound includes a stadium with 1,400 seats, four tennis courts, a press box, a polyethylene soccer pitch, 80 parking spaces, locker rooms, a storage facility, offices of coaches, and a concessions stand. In addition it has a running track that circles around the other facilities. The track is 400 metres (1,300 ft) long and has eight lanes. It has wide turns and a Beynon 1000 urethane surface. Stuart Holden, a midfielder for the Houston Dynamo and an alumnus of the school, attended the 2008 opening ceremony.

Prior to the opening of the athletic compound, each athletic team practiced off campus. Home tennis matched were played at the tennis courts of other schools in the 5A district of the Texas Association of Private and Parochial Schools. Practice for the tennis team was held at the Memorial Park Tennis Center at Memorial Park. The track team historically practiced at several stadiums of TAPPS 5A schools; in 2008 the team was practicing at the St. John's School. The soccer teams played only "away" games (games held at other schools or stadiums) before the opening of the new compound, and practiced on a soccer field on the Awty premises. Annette Baird of the Houston Chronicle describes the former soccer field as "an undersized bumpy pitch".

Currently, students competing in swimming at Awty practice at Dad's Club.

Awty Athletics Team Championships

Sport	Year
TAPPS Boys Tennis	2017
TAPPS Boys Swimming	2014
TAPPS Girls Swimming	2014
TAPPS Girls Cross Country	2013
TAPPS Girls Cross Country	2012
TAPPS Girls Swimming	2011
TAPPS Boys Swimming	2014
TAPPS Girls Swimming	2014
TAPPS Girls Cross Country	1991
TAPPS Girls Cross Country	2005
TAPPS Girls Cross Country	2007
TAPPS Boys Cross Country	2009
TAPPS Girls Cross Country	2012
TAPPS Girls Cross Country	2013
TAPPS Boys Tennis	1996
TAPPS Boys Tennis	1997
TAPPS Boys Tennis	2002
TAPPS Boys Tennis	2003
TAPPS Boys Soccer	1988
TAPPS Boys Soccer	1989
TAPPS Boys Soccer	1990
TAPPS Boys Soccer	1996
TAPPS Girls Soccer	2003

== Notable alumni ==
- Cristina Alexander (Class of 2010) - sports anchor for SportsCenter (ESPNDeportes) in Mexico City
- Ted Cruz (attended middle school) - United States Senator
- Stuart Holden (Class of 2003) - midfielder for the Houston Dynamo and Bolton Wanderers
- Clint Smith (Class of 2006) - writer, poet, and activist

== Notable faculty ==
- J. Fred Duckett - coach and history teacher
- Ryan Harlan - NCAA National Champion in the Decathlon

== See also ==
- British School of Houston
- St. John's School
- The Kinkaid School
- Memorial High School
