= Cassata Catholic High School =

Private school in Fort Worth, Texas, United States

Location
- 1400 Hemphill Street; Fort Worth, (Tarrant County), Texas 76104; United States; 32°43′45″N 97°19′55″W

Information
- Type: Private, Coeducational
- Religious affiliation: Catholic
- Established: 1975
- Principal: Julianna McConegly
- Grades: 9–12
- Slogan: We are a school for everyone!
- Mascot: Cavaliers
- Accreditation: Southern Association of Colleges and Schools
- Website: www.cassatahs.org

Cassata Catholic High School is a private, Catholic high school in Fort Worth, Texas. It is located in the Catholic Diocese of Fort Worth.

== Background ==
Cassata was established in 1975 as an alternative school for students who did not respond to a traditional educational environment. It is named after John Joseph Cassata. To date, more than 3,500 students have graduated from Cassata Catholic High School. The school is accredited by the Southern Association of Colleges and Schools (SACS) and the Texas Catholic Conference (TCC).
