= Notre Dame School of Dallas =

Coordinates: 32.7956°N 96.7952°W

Notre Dame School of Dallas is a Catholic school for children with intellectual disabilities in Uptown Dallas, Texas. It is the only private school in Dallas catering to intellectually disabled children. The target IQ scores are 30–70. Some students have Down syndrome. Its age range is six through 21.

It opened in 1963. As of 2015 it had 150 students.

The campus is co-located with St. Peter's Church. The school was rebuilt beginning in 2015.

== Extracurricular activities ==
It established a cheer squad circa 2000. Initially 15 pupils were a part of it.
