= Cristo Rey Fort Worth College Prep =

Coordinates: 32.64820°N 97.35684°W

Location
- 2633 Altamesa Blvd; Fort Worth, Texas 76133; United States

Information
- Type: Private, work-study, prep
- Denomination: Roman Catholic
- Established: 2018; 8 years ago
- Status: Open
- President: Dani Ray Barton
- Principal: Anna Brissman
- Staff: 57
- Teaching staff: 21
- Grades: 9–12 (by 2021)
- Gender: Coed
- Enrollment: 500 (projected);
- Colors: Blue and Gold
- Athletics: Girls soccer, girls basketball, boys basketball
- Mascot: Lion
- Website: http://www.cristoreyfortworth.org

Cristo Rey Fort Worth College Prep is a Catholic high school in Fort Worth, Texas that opened in 2018. It is a part of the Cristo Rey Network of 40 schools throughout the United States and is under the Roman Catholic Diocese of Fort Worth. The first Cristo Rey School was established in 1996 in Chicago, Illinois. In conjunction with local businesses, the students' education is subsidized through the work-study model used by schools in the Cristo Rey Network, of which it is a member.

The first campus was located at Terrell Heights Historic District in the former Our Mother of Mercy Catholic School. Students attending work jobs part-time to pay for tuition. Currently, Cristo Rey Fort Worth is located on a 4.47 acres at 2633 Altamesa Boulevard in Fort Worth, Texas 76133. The first graduating class from Cristo Rey Fort Worth will be in late May 2022. The school now enrolls all four grades 9 to 12, and admits students to grades 9 and 10 only.

== History ==
Cristo Rey Fort Worth began with a feasibility study required by the Cristo Rey Network. This required that at least 35 corporate partners be found for the work component of the student experience. The founders raised $3 million for initial support. For the first two years of operation, 300 potential students were identified. Students are to be from low-income families which are asked to pay whatever they can, typically about 10% of the tuition. The school is not a part of the diocesan system but rather an independent Catholic school accredited by the Texas Catholic Conference.

The school formerly occupied the buildings of the former "Our Mother of Mercy" school. The school is currently on the new, larger campus on Altamesa Boulevard in the former Southwood Baptist Church as of Fall of 2019.
