= St. Matthew Catholic School =

Location
- 10703 Wurzbach Road; San Antonio, Texas 78230; United States
- Coordinates: 29.539392°N 98.554680°W

Information
- Type: Private, Coeducational
- Motto: Excellence in learning, living, and serving.
- Religious affiliation: Roman Catholic
- Patron saint: St. Matthew
- Established: 1993
- School district: Archdiocese of San Antonio
- Principal: April Hallfrisch
- Grades: PK through 8th
- Enrollment: 731
- Color
- Athletics: Football, Basketball, Volleyball, Soccer, Cross Country, Track, Tennis, Softball, Baseball, Golf, Cheerleading
- Mascot: Cardinals
- Annual tuition: $7,156 - $8,910
- Pastor: Fr. Eric Ritter
- Website: Official website

St. Matthew Catholic School is a private, coeducational school established in 1993 by the Roman Catholic Archdiocese of San Antonio.

== Mission ==
The mission of St. Matthew Catholic School is to educate a strong, faith-centered community through a commitment to the spiritual, moral, intellectual, social, and physical development of each child.

== History ==
St. Matthew Catholic School opened its doors on August 18, 1993 to just under 400 students and has been open for 32 years with now over 700 students. Bishop Joseph Galante dedicated the school on October 10, 1993 with Sr. Patrice Floyd, IWBS serving as the first principal. From its foundation, St. Matthew has offered a full schedule for students from pre-kindergarten through 8th grade. As enrollment grew, new classes were added at each grade level. Geneva Salinas has been principal since 2019, and Fr. Dennis Arechiga has been the Pastor for both St. Matthew Parish and the school since 2010. Today, St. Matthew Catholic School has grown to be the largest elementary school in the Archdiocese.

St. Matthew has had six principals throughout its history, those being the following: Sr. Patrice Floyd (1993-1994), Curtis Youngman (1994-1996), Cindy Salinas (1996-2004), Alvin Caro (2004-2018), Jennifer Grenardo (2018–2019), and Geneva Salinas (2019–present). The school has also had three pastors throughout its history, those being John Flynn (1993-1998), Michael Yarbrough (1998-2010), and Dennis Arechiga (2010–Present). The current principal, Geneva Salinas holds a bachelor's degree in arts and a master's in education from Our Lady of the Lake University, and she holds a master's degree in Education Administration from Lamar University. She has been a school administrator for eight years and teacher for six years.

During the COVID-19 pandemic the school and church were both closed and the school held online instruction.

== School grounds ==
The school campus includes a library and media center, a science lab, two computer labs, a gymnasium and athletic complex, a music and choir room, and a cafeteria.

St. Matthew's Catholic School received a perfect score during an inspection on October 9, 2014.

Additionally, the school shares Parish facilities with St. Matthew Catholic Church that include the Church itself, the Parish Hall, and the Blessed Sacrament Chapel.

== Curriculum and academics ==
The curriculum includes age-appropriate coursework in the following areas: Language Arts, Mathematics, Science, Social Studies, Religion, Health, Spanish, Physical Education, Computer Literacy, Art, Band, Choir, and Music.

Technology has an increasingly important role in education at St. Matthew, as indicated by the iPad initiative and the Cardinal Advantage Classroom. The iPad program at St. Matthew, which was launched in 2013, allows for the issue of an Apple iPad to each child in 4th through 8th grade for use both at school and home as a primary learning tool, to be used for note-taking, content creation, project collaboration, individualized assessments and communicating with other students and their instructors. Younger grades use iPads to complete work in the classroom. Similarly, the Cardinal Advantage Classroom is equipped with ceiling-mounted LCD projectors, computers, faculty iPads, and Mimio Teach Systems. Pre-kindergarteners through third-graders can access mobile learning carts that contain a classroom set of iPads loaded with grade-specific educational applications.

St. Matthew offers honors courses and elective programs for Middle School students, and participates in the National Junior Honor Society. Students of all ages can participate in a variety of academic clubs and competitions, including Private School Interscholastic Association (PSIA). PSIA is a statewide competition that motivates students to find new excitement in learning and achieve a higher mastery level. Students compete at three levels including a school competition, district competition, and state.

Additionally St. Matthew requires all students to take part in the Accelerated Reader and Success Maker programs. Honor roll recognition and Accelerated Reader awards are given out quarterly to encourage academic excellence.

Due to the school's affiliation with the Catholic Church, students at St. Matthew are required to undergo sacramental preparation, participate in the Liturgy at weekly Mass, and take an annual course on Catholic theology.

== Athletics and extracurricular activities ==
St. Matthew offers various sports programs, with many of its teams having won district and citywide CYO competitions St. Matthew also offers a selection of extracurricular activities, including but not limited to Chess Club, Scouting, Pep Squad/Cheer, Twirling, Music Lessons, and Hand Bell Choir.

In 2015 the St. Matthew Catholic School Chess Team participated to the 4th Rackspace Scholastic Chess Tournament, winning first place in the Primary K-3 U400, Elementary K-5 U400 and Primary K-12 categories U600.

In 2015 the San Antonio's Children Museum held a Grand Opening Gala Student Art Contest and one of the three winners in the "Private Schools" category was a St. Matthew Catholic School student, who presented a project called "Building with Scraps."

== Charity ==
Among many charitable initiatives during the school year, St. Matthew Catholic School student council members conduct an annual canned food drive for the community food pantry at St. Vincent de Paul, collecting carts and containers of canned and boxed goods.

In 2015 during "The Big Give SA," a 24-hour online giving event involving hundreds of nonprofit organizations in San Antonio, St. Matthew Catholic School received the second highest number of unique donors.

St. Matthew Catholic School students actively support disaster relief initiatives. For example, in 2005 they supported Hurricane Katrina efforts by donating supplies to Operation Ryan's Hope, a local relief drive, inspired by a St. Matthew Catholic School second-grader who told his mother: "God is always looking out for me, and now I want to help God take care others." In 2010, to help raise funds for the earthquake relief efforts in Haiti, the St. Matthew Catholic School and Girl Scout Troop 223 held a “Hearts and Hats for Haiti” drive.

== Books ==
- McNamara, Patrick H. (February 1, 2003). "Chapter 3: So Many Ways You Can Give YourSelf Here". Called to Be Stewards: Bringing New Life to Catholic Parishes. Liturgical Press. pp. 39–54. ISBN 0814628893.
- Gerem, Yves (October 31, 2001). "Chapter: Private Prep Schools". A Marmac Guide to San Antonio. Pelican Publishing. p. 508. ISBN 1565548213.
