= St. Joseph High School (Victoria, Texas) =

Location
- 110 East Red River Street; Victoria, (Victoria County), Texas 77901; United States
- 28°47′39″N 97°0′28″W

Information
- Type: Private, Coeducational
- Religious affiliation: Roman Catholic
- Patron saint: Saint Joseph
- Founded: 1868
- Founder: Reverend Augustine Gardet
- CEEB code: 447270
- President: John H. Gilley IV
- Dean: John Brouillette
- Principal: Megan Schott
- Grades: 9–12
  - Grade 9: 72
  - Grade 10: 77
  - Grade 11: 56
  - Grade 12: 85
- Student to teacher ratio: 13:1
- Hours in school day: 8:30-3:20
- Colors: Blue and White
- Slogan: "You'll love the journey"
- Athletics conference: TAPPS 5A
- Nickname: STJ
- Team name: Flyers
- Accreditation: Texas Catholic Conference of Bishops — Education Department (TCCB-ED)
- Yearbook: Excelsior
- Athletic Director: Jacob Vasquez
- Website: www.stjflyers.com

St. Joseph High School is a private, coeducational Roman Catholic high school in Victoria, Texas. Founded in 1868 as St. Joseph's school for boys and coeducational since 1975, the school operates within the Roman Catholic Diocese of Victoria in Texas and is accredited by the Texas Catholic Conference of Bishops — Education Department (TCCB-ED). STJ offers a college-preparatory curriculum with Honors and Advanced Placement courses and competes in the Texas Association of Private and Parochial Schools (TAPPS) at the 5A level. As of the 2025-2026 school year, STJ enrolls about 290 students. Notable alumni include Doug Drabek, the 1990 National League Cy Young Award winner.

== History ==
The school traces its origins to 1868, when Father Augustine Gardet, pastor of St. Mary's Church in Victoria, founded a boys' school. In 1880, he expanded it to include a seminary. Later, in 1906, the Society of Mary established St. Joseph's grade school in Victoria. A high school was later added, and the first graduation took place in 1923. The school was staffed by Marianists for 66 years. In the late 1960s, the Brothers of Mary began to withdraw from the school, and the Sisters of the Incarnate Word and Blessed Sacrament began a merge between Nazareth Academy's high-school department and St. Joseph. By 1975, the process was complete and the new institution, run by Sisters under a board of laity, was known as St. Joseph High School. Nazareth Academy became a coeducational elementary and junior high school in 1976. The school's sesquicentennial was celebrated in 2018, and provides additional historical context and sourcing.

== Campus ==
St. Joseph High School's campus at 110 E. Red River Street includes buildings such as the O'Connor Hall (constructed in 1937), Welder Hall, the administration building, the school library, and the David Pozzi Fine Arts Center. Athletic facilities include the Tom O'Connor Jr. Athletic Center (the "Dome"), for basketball and volleyball, the Keating Field House, and the off-campus O'Connor Athletic Complex (the "Field of Dreams") for sub-varsity football, soccer, and softball.

== Academics ==
STJ is a non-ranking high school that offers college-preparatory curriculum. Graduation requires 30 credits, including four in English, mathematics, science, social studies, and theology. Two credits in foreign language, fine arts, physical education, Christian service, and electives are also required. STJ offers various Honors and Advanced Placement courses including AP Calculus, Chemistry, English Language and Literature, Music Theory, Statistics, and U.S. History. Students may also opt to take dual-credit electives.

== Spiritual life and student activities ==
As a Catholic school with a Marianist background, STJ offers its students Mass daily at St. Mary's Catholic Church. Retreats along with service activities are made available to students of all grades. Students have access to participate in a wide range of electives and organizations including National Honor Society, Student Council, speech and debate, band, choir, theatre, art, Campus Ministry, and many interest-based clubs.

== Athletics ==
St. Joseph High School competes in TAPPS at the 5A level across boys' and girls' sports. The Flyers' boys' track and field program won back-to-back TAPPS state titles in both 2017 and in 2018.

== Publications ==
The school yearbook is "Excelsior", and an annual "St. Joseph Magazine" is produced by the advancement office for alumni.

== Notable alumni ==
Doug Drabek (Class of 1980), MLB pitcher and 1990 NL Cy Young Award winner.
