= Father Yermo Schools =

Location
- Headquarters: 202 Washington, El Paso, TX 79928; Secondary: 250 Washington, El Paso, TX 79905; Elementary: 237 Tobin Place, El Paso, TX 79905; 31°46′9″N 106°26′23″W

Information
- Type: Private, Coeducational
- Religious affiliation: Roman Catholic
- Established: 1960
- Founder: José Maria de Yermo y Parres
- President: Sr. Maria Angelica Omaña, SSHJP
- Dean: Jesus Ruvalcaba
- Principal: Sister Yamila Trejo
- Chaplain: Sr. Rosario Perez
- Grades: PreK–12
- Hours in school day: 8
- Colors: Red and Black
- Slogan: Learning for life
- Sports: Basketball; volleyball; soccer
- Mascot: Spartan
- Rival: Faith Christian Academy
- Accreditation: Southern Association of Colleges and Schools
- Newspaper: N/A
- Website: fatheryermoelpaso.org

Father Yermo Schools is a private, Roman Catholic 3K-12 school in El Paso, Texas. It is located in the Roman Catholic Diocese of El Paso. It is named after José Maria de Yermo y Parres.

It has separate facilities for elementary and secondary school, and a separate headquarters.
