= Holy Trinity Catholic High School (Texas) =

Location
- 6608 West Adams Avenue; Temple, Texas; Temple, (Bell County), Texas 76502; United States; 31.119095°N 97.411437°W

Information
- Type: Private, Coeducational
- Motto: Forming the Christian Leaders of Tomorrow
- Religious affiliation: Roman Catholic
- Established: 1997
- School district: Diocese of Austin
- Superintendent: Misty Poe
- Principal: Jacqueline Wright
- Faculty: 15
- Grades: 9–12
- Gender: Coed
- Average class size: 15
- Student to teacher ratio: 5:1
- Campus: rural
- Campus size: 35 acres
- Colors: Navy and Gold
- Song: In the Halls of Holy Trinity
- Athletics: Yes
- Athletics conference: TAPPS 2A
- Mascot: Celtic
- Nickname: HTCHS
- Newspaper: Trinity Times
- School fees: $300-$500
- Tuition: $12,950.00 (Substantial financial aid available)
- Athletic Director: Isaac Bravo
- Website: http://www.holytrinitychs.org

Holy Trinity Catholic High School or HTCHS is a private high school in Temple, Texas. Holy Trinity Catholic High School is a private, co-educational college-preparatory school. It is located in the Roman Catholic Diocese of Austin.

== History ==
Holy Trinity was established as an independent school by a group of parents in 1997 with a core group of twelve freshmen, and using the facilities of St. Luke's Catholic Church in Temple. The school was housed in the Religious Education Building on the St. Luke's campus. Adding bus transportation in January 2001 allowed students from south and west Bell County to attend the school. During its first four years, Holy Trinity added many athletic and extra-curricular programs to the school, including the first drama production, first newspaper, and first yearbook in 2000. The first class graduated from Holy Trinity in 2001.

In August 2001, the school moved to the Vandiver school building, a historic school building owned by the Temple Independent School District. In 2004, the school was allowed use of the adjacent modular building, now known as the Assisi Annex. In 2005, Holy Trinity secured a donation of a portable science building from the Cameron Independent School District and was able to move the building, creating the EBCO Science Center. In 2007, the school added another modular building, now known as the Aquinas Math Building. During the past several years, Holy Trinity increased academic offerings to include many advanced placement and dual credit classes. In recent years, the school has had success in extra-curricular activities, including thirteen state championships in academics, two state championships in boys' golf, and girls state championship in 2009 and 2010.

On November 30, 2010, the students, faculty, staff, parents and volunteers moved the school to its new facility at 6608 W. Adams Avenue. In 2012 the school built the Tornado Safe Shelter which is used as a cafeteria and auditorium.
