= St. Catherine's Montessori School =

St. Catherine's Montessori

Location
- 9821 Timberside Drive; Houston, Texas 77025; United States; 29.675021°N 95.431838°W

Information
- Type: Private school
- Established: 1966
- Head of school: Lina Delgado
- Employees: 50
- Enrollment: 290 (2025)
- Website: Official Website

St. Catherine's Montessori is a Catholic Montessori School in Houston, Texas.

St. Catherine's educates children ages 14 months to 18 years. The school is part of the Archdiocese of Galveston-Houston.

== See also ==
- Christianity in Houston
