= St. Joseph Catholic School (Bryan, Texas) =

Location
- 600 South Coulter Drive; Bryan, (Brazos County), Texas 77803; United States; 30°39′49″N 96°21′52″W

Information
- School type: Private, Co-educational Parochial
- Religious affiliation: Roman Catholic
- Established: 1894
- Founder: Fr. Joseph Pelnar
- School district: Three
- Principal: Principal, Mr. Juan Nagore
- Chaplain: Rev. Brian Eilers
- Grades: PK–12
- Average class size: 12–20
- Classes offered: Core Curriculum, College Prep, Latin, Spanish, Dual Credit English & History, Advanced Placement English, Calculus, & Physics
- Colors: Purple, Gold, & White
- Slogan: Educating the mind, body and spirit since 1894.
- Athletics conference: TAPPS 3A
- Mascot: The Eagle
- Team name: Eagles
- Accreditation: Texas Catholic Conference Education Department(TCCED) and Southern Association of Colleges and Schools (SACS)
- Affiliation: Parochial, St. Joseph Catholic Church
- Admissions/Registrar: Margaret Teitjen
- Development Director: Gentry Woodard
- Marketing Director: Sarah Badillo
- Athletic Director: William Patterson
- Website: stjosephschoolbcs.org

The St. Joseph Catholic School System is a parochial school located in Bryan, Texas. It was established by Father Joseph Pelnar in 1894. Grading curriculum ranges from Pre-K to 12th grade.

== History ==
St. Joseph School was founded by Father Joseph Pelnar in 1894. The first academy was originally located in Galveston but was later moved to Bryan after the hurricane of 1900, and the Ursuline Sisters were placed in charge of the school. The Villa Maria Convent was built on St. Ursula's Hill, a mile northeast of St. Joseph Catholic Church. In 1926, the Villa Maria Academy was closed after 25 years in Bryan, and the Sisters of the Incarnate Word of Houston succeeded the Ursuline Sisters as teachers at St. Joseph's Parochial School. Because of growth in the parish, additional classrooms were required. The new building —still a present structure operating as the St. Joseph Catholic School Eagle's Nest– was constructed at the intersection of East 26th Street and Preston in Byran. This new building was dedicated in 1960. In the early 1990s, St. Joseph Catholic School purchased what is now the Elementary Campus from Bryan ISD.

In 2001, St. Joseph purchased the property on Coulter Street in Bryan of Central Baptist Church to make room for a growing population of students. Central Baptist in turn constructed a new sanctuary at 1991 FM 158, the farm-to-market road which leads to Huntsville. In 2000, what is now the Holy Family Retreat Center was given to St. Joseph Church in the last will and testament of Dorothy Alice Holler.

== Early Learning Center ==
The Early Learning Center serves as a center for children from six weeks up to three years of age. The ELC is located at 109 North Preston Street.

== Elementary campus ==
The elementary campus, for grades Pre-K through 5, is located between William Joel Bryan Parkway and Travis Street, about 200 yards west of St. Joseph Catholic Church and the Early Learning Center. St. Joseph School purchased the building from Bryan ISD in the 1990. It was originally built as a public elementary school, Travis Elementary, and has been continually in use for over 75 years. The building consists of two floors of classrooms, a gym, a cafeteria, and several reference rooms (including a library, a computer lab, and a religious education office). The Elementary Campus completed the addition of another wing and multi-purpose room in time for the 2010-2011 school year.

== Secondary campus ==
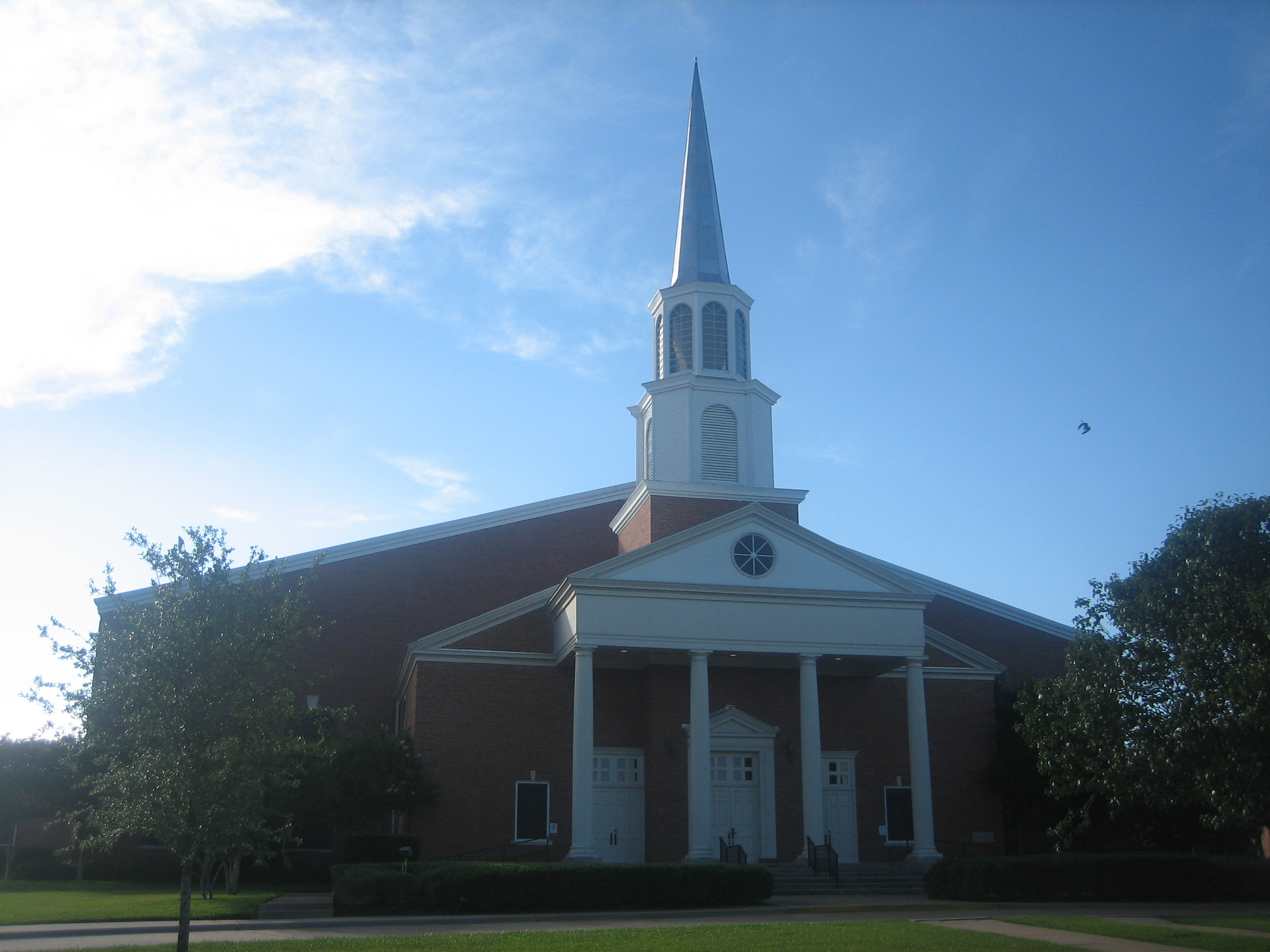
Christ the Good Shepherd Chapel of St. Joseph Catholic School is the former sanctuary of the large Central Baptist Church, relocated to 1991 FM 158 in northeastern Bryan.

The secondary campus, serving grades 6 through 12, was obtained in 2001, from Central Baptist Church. The former Central Baptist sanctuary was renamed Christ the Good Shepherd Chapel. This campus consists of two buildings: the main building and a multi-purpose gymnasium. The main building contains the chapel, a biology lab, chemistry lab, band hall, art room, computer lab, library, and 14 classrooms. To the north is the Junior High School wing, and to the south is the High School wing. The second building contains a cafeteria, a gymnasium, offices, and classroom space.

=== High school program ===
The high school program was first established in 1994 on the main campus, before moving to the secondary campus in 2001.

=== Sports History ===
St. Joseph offers a wide array of sports including, Football, Volleyball, Basketball, Soccer, Golf, Track, Baseball, and Softball. Over the past years, St. Joseph's football team has been State Semi-Finalists in 2023 and 2024, won back-to-back district champions in 2020-2021, and were the All Brazos Valley Team of the Year in 2024. The Volleyball program were State-Runner Ups in 2021. Additionally, St. Joseph's Baseball team has won numerous district championship titles.
