= Our Lady of the Hills High School =

Our Lady of the Hills College Prep

Location
- 235 Peterson Farm Road; Kerrville, (Kerr County), Texas 78028; United States; 29°59′39″N 99°5′55.5″W

Information
- Type: Private, Coeducational
- Motto: "Ad Majorem Dei Gloriam"; "Veritas" ("All for the Greater Glory of God"; "Truth")
- Religious affiliation: Roman Catholics
- Established: 1998
- School district: Roman Catholic Archdiocese of San Antonio
- Principal: Bridget Collins
- Grades: 9–12
- Student to teacher ratio: 8:1
- Campus size: 86 acres (350,000 m^{2})
- Colors: Blue & Black
- Slogan: Men and Women for Others
- Athletics conference: TAPPS 1A
- Mascot: Hawk
- Team name: Hawks
- Website: Website

Our Lady of the Hills College Prep (OLH, OLH College Prep) is a private, Roman Catholic high school in Kerrville, Texas. It is located in the Roman Catholic Archdiocese of San Antonio.

== Background ==
Feasibility studies were conducted in local and surrounding communities from 1996 to 1997, and the results affirmed that interest and funding potential existed for the new school. The planning group sought guidance from the Roman Catholic Archdiocese of San Antonio. After receiving counsel from Archbishop Patrick Flores and with cooperation of the Fredericksburg Deanery, the Our Lady of the Hills College Prep project was incorporated as a 501(c)(3) organization in 1998 (under the original working name, “St. Ignatius Regional Catholic High School”).
