= Shiner Catholic School =

Private coeducational school in Texas

Location
- 424 St. Ludmila St. Shiner, (Lavaca County), Texas 77984; United States; 29°25′18″N 97°9′55″W

Information
- Type: Private, Coeducational
- Motto: Preparing the Children of God for the Kingdom of God since 1897
- Religious affiliation: Roman Catholic
- Authority: Roman Catholic Diocese of Victoria in Texas
- Principal: Neely Yackel
- Grades: PreK-3–12
- Colors: Red & White
- Athletics conference: TAPPS 2A Division IV
- Sports: Football, Basketball, Track, Cross Country, Baseball, Softball, Tennis, Golf, Volleyball
- Mascot: Cardinal
- Team name: Cardinals
- Tuition: In Parish, Out of Parish and Non-Catholic Rates
- Website: Shiner Catholic School

Shiner Catholic School is a private, Roman Catholic K-12 school in Shiner, Texas. It is located in the Roman Catholic Diocese of Victoria in Texas. It has two components: St. Lumila Elementary School and St. Paul High School.

== Background ==
The educational complex comprising St. Ludmila Elementary and St. Paul High School became known as Shiner Catholic School in 1997.

In 2012, the Janak Music Center was completed. The building serves students in grades K-12 beginning in the 2012–2013 school year. In late 2018 a new building was completed on the school campus. It is the Administration / PreK building and it serves as the main entrance to Shiner Catholic School.

== Athletics ==
St. Paul High School students compete in Football, Volleyball, Baseball, Softball, Track, Cross Country, Golf, Swimming and Tennis through the Texas Association of Private and Public School (TAPPS). The school teams hold numerous state titles:

- Football – 11-man Football (10 TAPPS State championships and 1 TCIL State championships) 2021 Div IV 2020 Div IV; 2019 Div IV; 2018 Div IV; 2016 Div IV; 2015 Div III; 2012 Div III; 2010 Div IV; 1997 2A; 1992 1A; 1987 TCIL
- Cross country – girls:2019, 2018, 2017, 2016, 2015, 2014, 2013, 2010, 2009, 2008, 2009, 2010, 2011, 2012, 2013, 2014, 2015, 2016, 2017, 2018, 2019
- Cross country – boys: 2017 State runner up, 2016 State runner up, 2015, 2005
- Volleyball: 1994 1A; 1993 1A
- Basketball – girls: 2017 2A; 1998 1A; 1992 1A
- Track – girls:2021, 2019, 2018, 2017, 2016, 2015
- Track – boys: 2021 State runner up, 2018 State Runner up, 2017, 2016, 2015, 2016, 2017, 2018
- Golf – : 2018 – 2A; 2017 – 2A
- Baseball:2023 2A/; 2013 1A/2A; 2011 1A/2A; 2009 1A/2A; 2006 2A; 2005 2A; 2003 2A; 1999 1A; 1998 2A; 1995 1A; 1989 2A
- Softball: 2019 2A; 2016 1A/2A; 2012 1A/2A; 2011 1A/2A; 2005 2A; 2004 1A/2A; 1999 1A/2A; 1997 2A; 1996 1A; 1995 1A; 1994 1A; 1993 1A, 2017, 2018

TAPPS awards an Over-All State Championship Trophy – The Henderson Championship Cup to the school in each classification that accumulates the most points in all competitions in order to recognize state champions in Art, Academics, Vocal, Instrumental Music, and various team sports. St. Paul High School was awarded the Henderson 2A Overall Championship Cup for the 2010–2011, 2011–2012, 2015–2016, 2016–2017; 2017–2018, 2018–2019, 2020-2021 school year.

== Alumni ==
- Logan Ondrusek
