= St. Gerard Catholic High School =

Location
- 521 South New Braunfels Avenue; San Antonio, (Bexar County), Texas 78203; United States; 29°24′51″N 98°27′43″W

Information
- Type: Private, Coeducational
- Religious affiliation: Roman Catholic
- Established: 1927
- Closed: 2022
- Grades: 9–12
- Colors: Royal Blue and White
- Athletics: Football, Basketball (Boys and Girls), Baseball and Softball, Tennis (Coed), Volleyball
- Athletics conference: TAPPS 2A
- Team name: Royals
- Publication: Royal Proclamation
- Website: http://www.stgerardsa.org

St. Gerard Catholic High School was a private Catholic high school in San Antonio, Texas. It is located in the Roman Catholic Archdiocese of San Antonio. St. Gerard was established in 1927 and closed in 2022.

== College dual credit ==
Ninety-one percent of graduates went on to college, with many seniors taking Educational and Technical courses for dual credit at St. Philips College.

St. Gerard juniors and seniors were eligible to participate in St. Philip College dual credit program; as well as its Southwest Campus Academies, Information Technology and Security Academy, Alamo Area Aerospace Academy, and Manufacturing Technology Academy.

== Extra-curricular athletics and clubs ==
The school offered athletic opportunities for all students. Boys participated in football, basketball, baseball, and tennis. Girl’s athletics included volleyball, basketball, softball, and tennis. The Royals competed in the Texas Association of Private and Parochial Schools (TAPPS).

Organizations included:

- National Honor Society
- Cheerleaders
- Student Council
- Mu Alpha Theta
- Royal Ambassadors
- Dance Team

The Royal Ambassadors were students who represented St. Gerard at various events both on and off campus, showing their “Royal Pride” to all whom they meet. Royal Ambassadors visited other Catholic schools on recruitment days, offered tours to new and prospective students, and assisted where needed, as per directions from the principal.

Royal Ambassadors were required to maintain a 3.0 GPA, have faculty recommendations, and submit an application and letter of interest to the principal.

The following State Championships (TCIL) were won at St. Gerard:

Sport	Years won
Football	1985
Softball	1975,1977,1980,1981,1982,1983,1984,1985,1986,1990,1992,1993
Basketball	1955, 1981, 1993
Baseball	1979
Volleyball	1986

== Religious staff ==
Name	Institute	Year of arrival
Sister Julie Brady, SSND	School Sister of Notre Dame	2002
Sister Jo Goolish, OSF	School Sisters of St. Francis	2002
Sister Elizabeth Hatzenbuehler, OSU	Ursuline Sisters	2003
