= Sacred Heart Catholic School (Muenster, Texas) =

Location
- 714 North Main Street; Muenster, (Cooke County), Texas 76252; United States; 33°39′19″N 97°22′33″W

Information
- Type: Private, Coeducational
- Religious affiliation: Roman Catholic
- Established: 1890
- Grades: PK–12
  - Kindergarten: 12
  - Grade 1: 14
  - Grade 2: 17
  - Grade 3: 9
  - Grade 4: 12
  - Grade 5: 25
  - Grade 6: 15
  - Grade 7: 15
  - Grade 8: 23
  - Grade 9: 22
  - Grade 10: 15
  - Grade 11: 17
  - Grade 12: 22
  - Other: 25
- Hours in school day: 8
- Colors: Red & White
- Mascot: Tiger and Tigerette
- Nickname: Tigers
- Accreditation: Southern Association of Colleges and Schools
- Website: Sacred Heart School

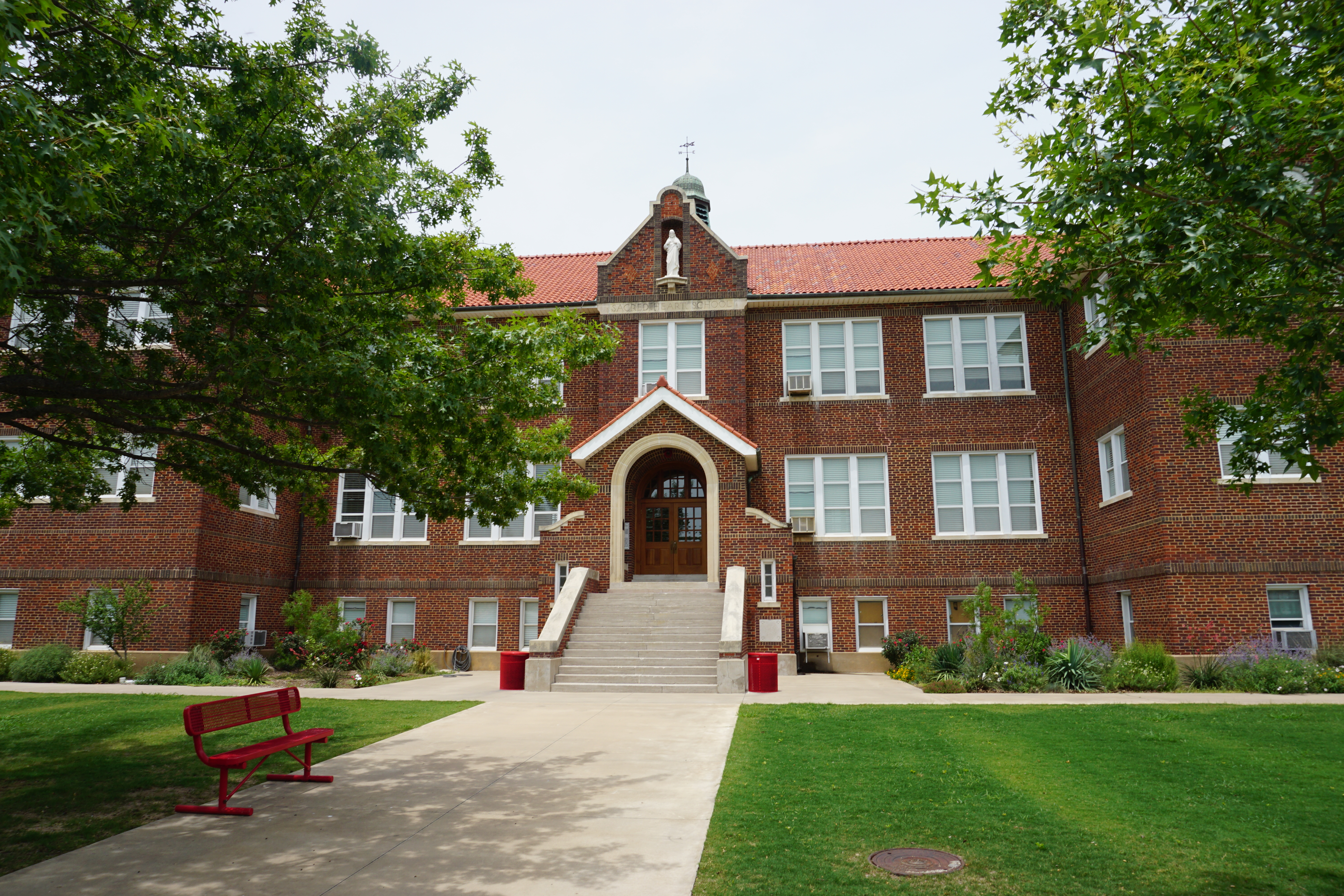
Sacred Heart Elementary School

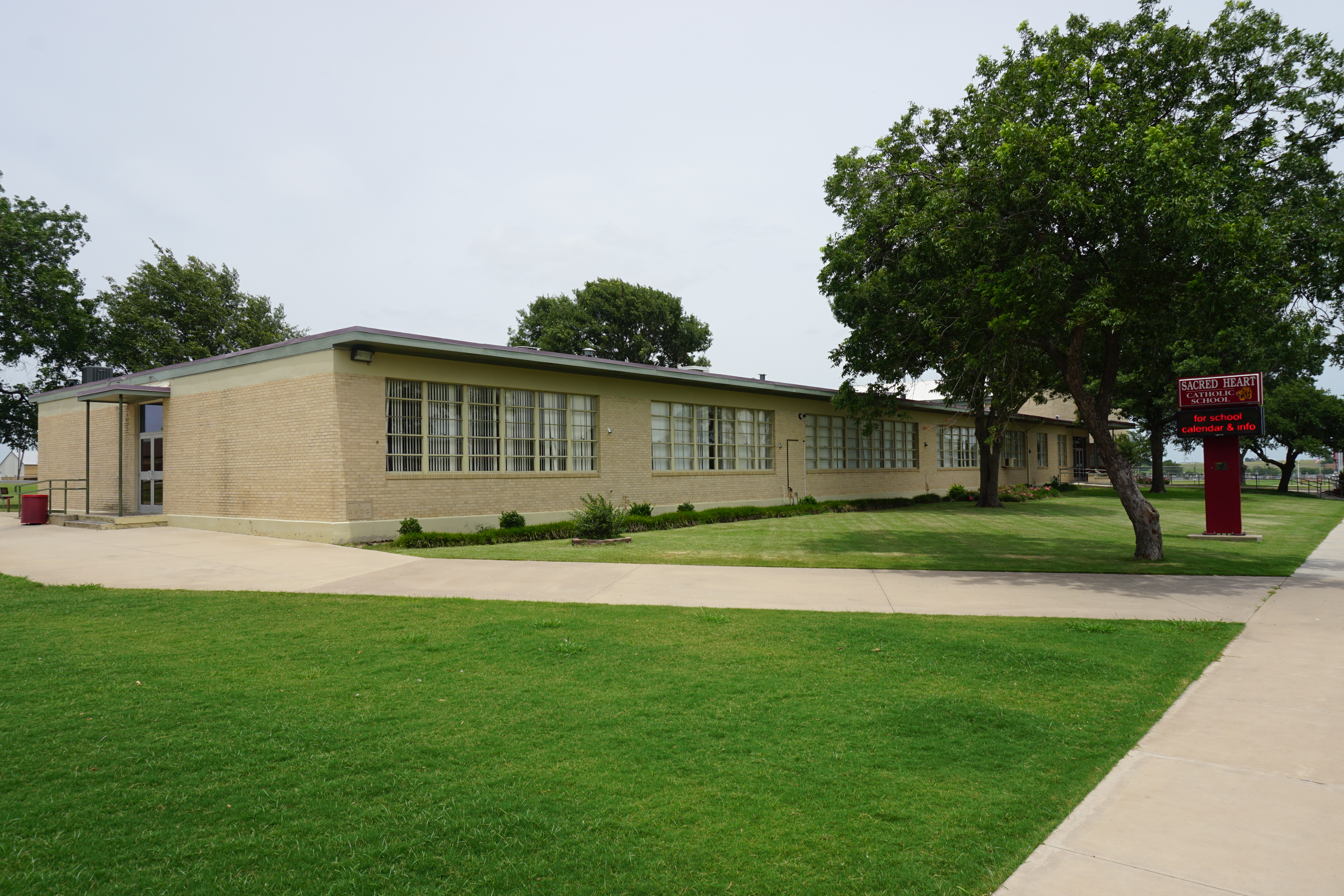
Sacred Heart High School

Sacred Heart Catholic School is a Catholic school based in Muenster, Texas, United States located on Sacred Heart Church grounds serving students in preschool through Grade 12. Recognized in the top 50 of Catholic schools in the nation, SHCS is one of only two Catholic preschool and elementary schools in Cooke County and one of only four Catholic high schools in the Fort Worth Diocese.

- Sacred Heart Montessori (Montessori program for three- and four-year-olds and kindergarten)

National Catholic Education Association Elizabeth Ann Seton Award

- Sacred Heart Elementary (Grades 1-8)

U.S. Department of Education Blue Ribbon School of Excellence Award

- Sacred Heart High School (Grades 9-12)

U.S. Department of Education Blue Ribbon School of Excellence Award
Catholic High School Honor Roll Award

== Background ==
Sacred Heart Catholic School was established in 1890. It began offering a 4 year high school program in 1937. Sacred Heart Catholic School is a member of the Texas Association of Private and Parochial Schools, (TAPPS).

== Athletics ==
The Sacred Heart Tigers currently compete in the following sports:

Cross Country, Volleyball, Football, Basketball, Golf, Track, Softball & Baseball

The Tigers have also competed in Swimming and Tennis

Sacred Heart has won numerous State Championships in Girls Basketball, Football, Softball, Girls & Boys Track, Girls & Boys Cross Country, Boys Golf, and Boys and Girls Swim.

Football State Champions : 1994 2003 State Runner-Up: 2004 2021 Final Four: 2000 2001 2006 2019 2022 Girls Basketball State Champions 1982-1983 1985-1986 1987-1988 1988-1989 1989-1990 1997-1998 1998-1999 1999-2000 2000-2001 2001-2002 2002-2003 2003-2004 2006-2007 2011-2012 State Runner Up 1992-1993 1996-1997 2005-2006 2015-2016 2016-2017 State Final Four 1986-1987 1992-1993
