= Cristo Rey =

Cristo Rey (Spanish, 'Christ the King') may refer to:

== Places ==
- Cristo Rey, Cayo, Belize
- Cristo Rey, Corozal, Belize
- Cristo Rey, Distrito Nacional, Santo Domingo, Dominican Republic

== Education ==
- Colegio Cristo Rey, Asunción, Paraguay
- Cristo Rey Polytechnic Institute, Valladolid, Spain
- Cristo Rey College, Tacna, Peru
- Cristo Rey Network, a network of Jesuit schools in the United States

- Cristo Rey Jesuit High School, Chicago, IL
- Cristo Rey Boston High School, Boston, MA
- Cristo Rey St. Martin College Prep, Waukegan, IL
- Notre Dame Cristo Rey High School, Lawrence, MA
- Cristo Rey New York High School, New York City
- Cristo Rey Kansas City High School, Kansas City, MO
- Cristo Rey High School, Sacramento, CA
- Cristo Rey Jesuit High School, Baltimore, MD
- Holy Family Cristo Rey High School, Birmingham, AL
- Providence Cristo Rey High School, Indianapolis, IN
- Cristo Rey Jesuit High School, Minneapolis, MN
- Don Bosco Cristo Rey High School, Takoma Park, MD
- Cristo Rey Brooklyn High School, Brooklyn, NY
- Detroit Cristo Rey High School, Detroit, MI
- Cristo Rey Jesuit College Preparatory of Houston, Houston, TX
- DePaul Cristo Rey High School, Cincinnati, OH
- Cristo Rey Philadelphia High School, Philadelphia, PA
- Cristo Rey Columbus High School, Columbus, OH
- Cristo Rey San José Jesuit High School, San Jose, CA
- Cristo Rey Atlanta Jesuit High School. Atlanta, GA
- Cristo Rey Jesuit High School Milwaukee, Milwaukee, WI
- Cristo Rey Dallas College Prep, Dallas, TX
- Cristo Rey Tampa High School, Tampa, FL
- Cristo Rey Baton Rouge Franciscan High School, Baton Rouge, LA
- Cristo Rey OKC, Oklahoma City, OK
- Cristo Rey Fort Worth High School, Fort Worth, TX
- Cristo Rey De La Salle East Bay High School, Oakland, CA
- Cristo Rey Richmond High School, Richmond, VA
- Cristo Rey San Diego High School, San Diego, CA

== Other uses ==
- Cristo Rey (film), a 2013 Dominican Republic film
- Cristo Rey (Mexican statue), on Cerro del Cubilete, Mexico
- Cristo Rey (Colombian statue), in Cali, Colombia

== See also ==
- Cristo Rei (disambiguation), the Portuguese equivalent
- Christ the King (disambiguation)
- Guerrilleros de Cristo Rey, a Spanish far-right paramilitary organization in the 1970s
