= List of Jesuit secondary schools in the United States =

Jesuits have founded and/or managed a number of institutions, the first of which was Georgetown Preparatory School, established in 1789. The second oldest is St. Louis University High School, which was founded in 1818. Jesuit secondary schools in the U.S. include (listed by state):

== Alaska ==
- Monroe Catholic High School (Fairbanks)

== Arizona ==
- Brophy College Preparatory (Phoenix)

== California ==
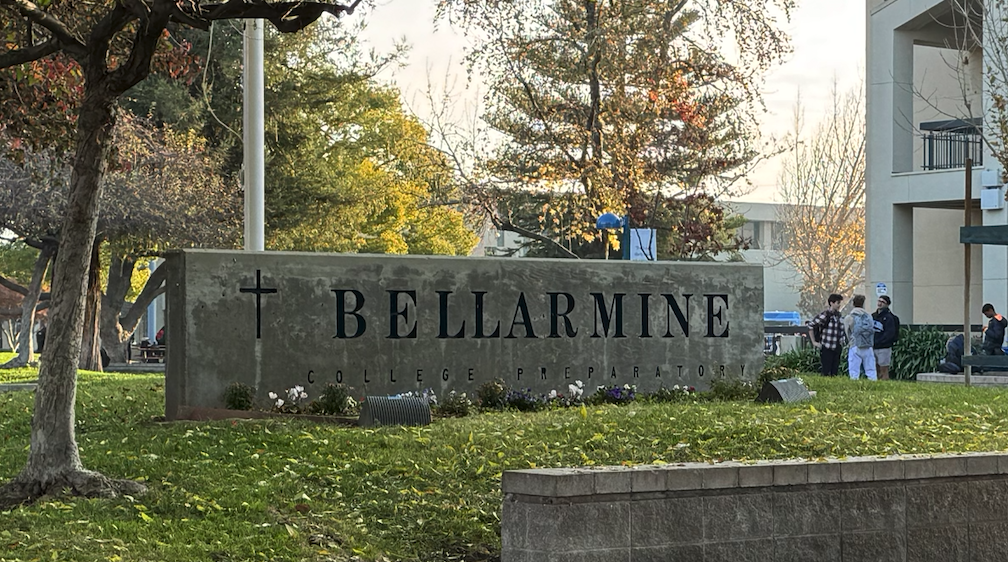
Bellarmine College Preparatory - San Jose, CA

- Bellarmine College Preparatory (San Jose)
- Cristo Rey San José Jesuit High School (San Jose)
- Cristo Rey High School (Sacramento) (along with 1 other congregation)
- Jesuit High School (Sacramento)
- Loyola High School (Los Angeles)
- St. Ignatius College Preparatory (San Francisco)
- Verbum Dei Jesuit High School (Los Angeles)
- Xavier College Preparatory (Palm Desert) (Jesuit-endorsed, as in Ignatian tradition)

== Colorado ==
- Arrupe Jesuit High School (Denver)
- Regis Jesuit High School (Aurora)

== Connecticut ==
- Fairfield College Preparatory School (Fairfield)

== District of Columbia ==
- Gonzaga College High School (Washington, D.C.)

== Florida ==
- Belen Jesuit Preparatory School (Miami)
- Jesuit High School (Tampa)

== Georgia ==
- Cristo Rey Atlanta Jesuit High School

== Illinois ==
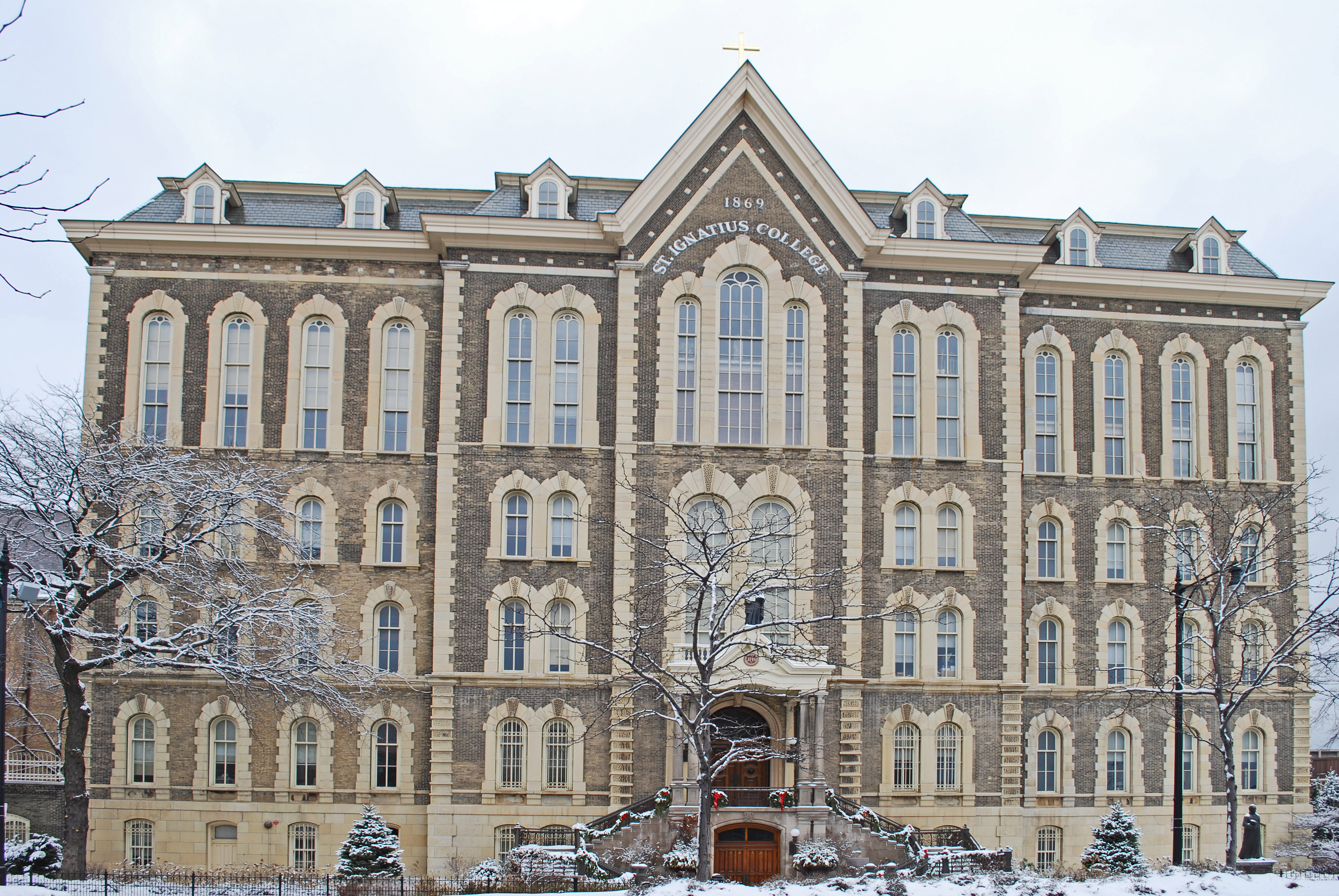
St. Ignatius, Chicago

- Christ the King Jesuit College Prep High School (Chicago)
- Cristo Rey Jesuit High School (Chicago)
- Loyola Academy (Wilmette)
- St. Ignatius College Prep (Chicago)

== Indiana ==
- Brebeuf Jesuit Preparatory School (Indianapolis)

== Louisiana ==
- Jesuit High School (New Orleans)

== Maine ==
- Cheverus High School (Portland)

== Maryland ==
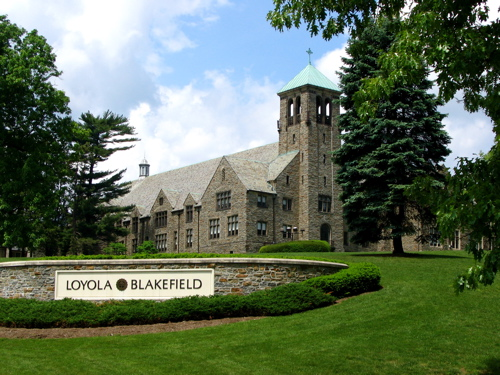
Loyola Blakefield

- Cristo Rey Jesuit High School (Baltimore)
- Georgetown Preparatory School (North Bethesda)
- Loyola Blakefield (Towson)

== Massachusetts ==
- Boston College High School (Boston)

== Michigan ==
- Loyola High School (Detroit)
- University of Detroit Jesuit High School and Academy (Detroit)

== Minnesota ==
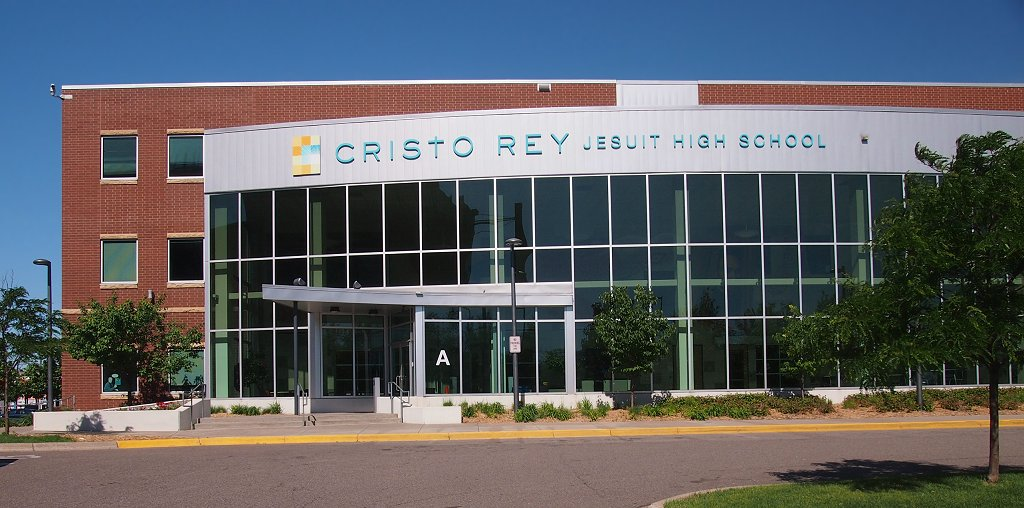
Cristo Rey, Minneapolis

- Cristo Rey Jesuit High School (Minneapolis)

== Missouri ==
- De Smet Jesuit High School (Creve Coeur)
- Rockhurst High School (Kansas City)
- Saint Louis University High School (St. Louis)

== Montana ==
- Loyola Sacred Heart High School (Missoula)

== Nebraska ==
- Creighton Preparatory School (Omaha)

== New Jersey ==
- St. Peter's Preparatory School (Jersey City)

== New York ==
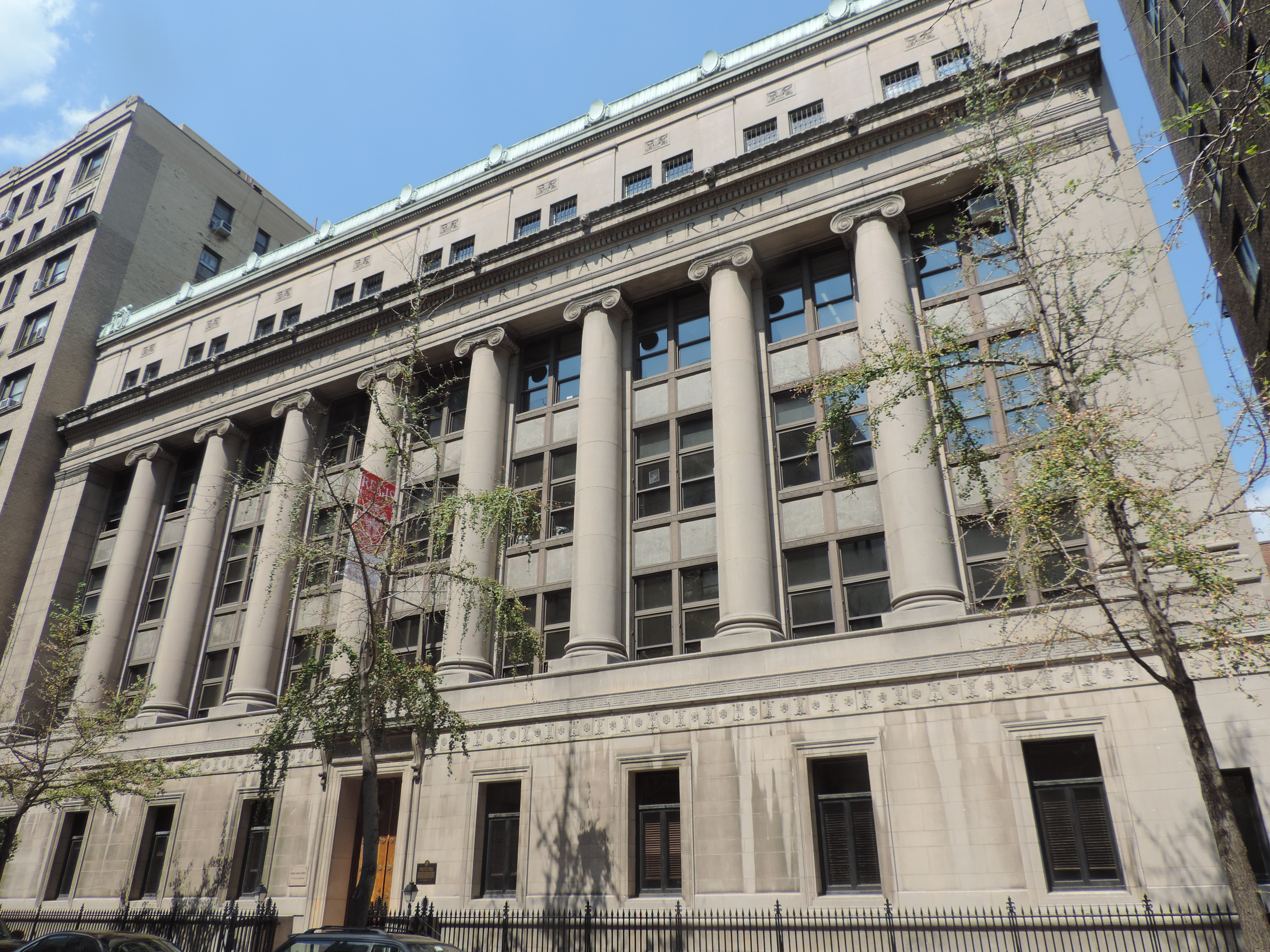
Regis, New York

- Canisius High School (Buffalo)
- Cristo Rey New York High School (New York City) (with 2 other congregations)
- Fordham Preparatory School (New York City)
- Loyola School (New York City)
- McQuaid Jesuit High School (Rochester)
- Regis High School (New York City)
- Xavier High School (New York City)

== Ohio ==
- Saint Ignatius High School (Cleveland) (Cleveland)
- St. John's Jesuit High School and Academy (Toledo)
- St. Martin de Porres High School (Cleveland) (Cleveland)
- St. Xavier High School (Cincinnati)
- Walsh Jesuit High School (Cuyahoga Falls)

== Oregon ==
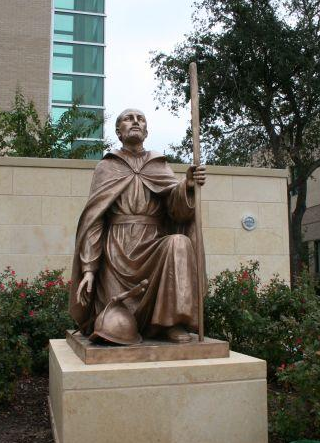
St. Ignatius; Strake, Houston

- Jesuit High School (Portland)

== Pennsylvania ==
- Saint Joseph's Preparatory School (Philadelphia)
- Scranton Preparatory School (Scranton)

== Puerto Rico ==
- Colegio San Ignacio de Loyola (San Juan)

== South Dakota ==
- Red Cloud High School (Pine Ridge)

== Texas ==
- Cristo Rey Jesuit College Preparatory of Houston (Houston)
- Jesuit College Preparatory School (Dallas)
- Strake Jesuit College Preparatory (Houston)

== Washington ==
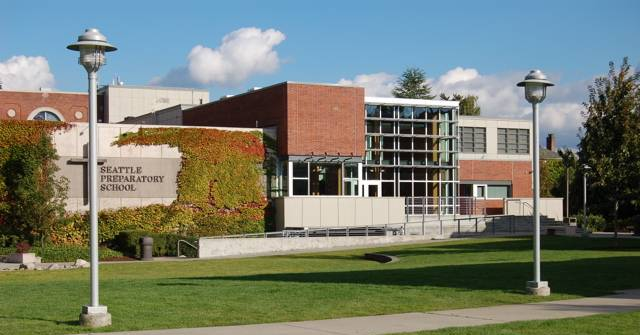
Seattle Prep

- Bellarmine Preparatory School (Tacoma)
- Gonzaga Preparatory School (Spokane)
- Seattle Preparatory School

== Wisconsin ==
- Campion High School (Prairie du Chien, Wisconsin) (closed in 1975; alumni association remains active)
- Cristo Rey Jesuit High School Milwaukee
- Marquette University High School (Milwaukee)

== See also ==
- Association of Jesuit Colleges and Universities
- List of Jesuit educational institutions
- University-preparatory school
- List of former Jesuit secondary schools in the United States
- List of Jesuit sites
- Jesuits in the United States
