= Jesuit High =

Jesuit High may refer to:

- Jesuit High School (New Orleans)
- Jesuit High School (Tampa)
- Jesuit High School (Sacramento)
- Walsh Jesuit High School
- Jesuit High School (Beaverton, Oregon)
- Jesuit College Preparatory School of Dallas - Texas
- Regis Jesuit High School
- McQuaid Jesuit High School
- De Smet Jesuit High School
- St. John's Jesuit High School and Academy
- University of Detroit Jesuit High School and Academy
- Arrupe Jesuit High School
- Cristo Rey Network § List of schools, several schools in the U.S.
- Vilnius Jesuit High School in Lithuania
