= Matt Hanna =

American lacrosse player (born 1979)

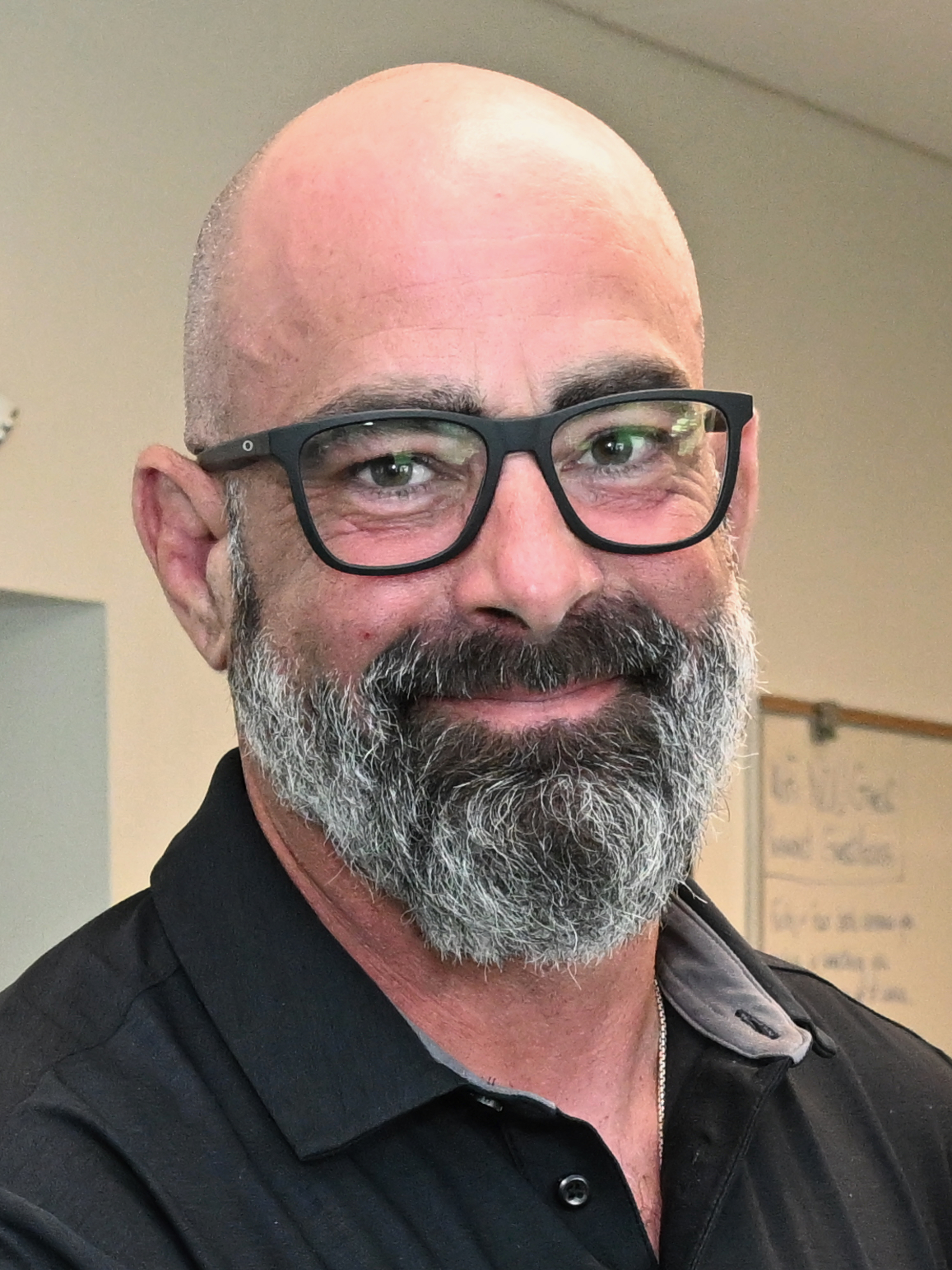
- Hanna in 2025

Personal information
- Nationality: American
- Born: January 29, 1979 (age 46) Geneva, New York, U.S.
- Height: 6 ft 1 in (185 cm)
- Weight: 220 lb (100 kg; 15 st 10 lb)

Sport
- Position: Forward
- MLL team Former teams: Denver Outlaws; Heaton Mersey LC, Manchester, England
- Pro career: 2003–2008

Matt Hanna (born January 29, 1979) is an American lacrosse player who played for the Denver Outlaws of Major League Lacrosse. Hanna served as captain of the 2002 Johns Hopkins University lacrosse program in Baltimore, Maryland. Hanna was selected as an MLL All-Star in 2008, and retired at the end of the '08 season. Matt Hanna is the founder and director of Next One Up, an inner city mentoring program for at-risk student-athletes in Baltimore City. He is also the head lacrosse coach at Cristo Rey Jesuit High School in Baltimore.

== MLL ==
		Regular Season							Playoffs
Season	Team	GP	G	2ptG	A	Pts	LB	PIM	GP	G	2ptG	A	Pts	LB	PIM
2006	Denver	6	5	0	7	12	11	0	0	0	0	0	0	0	0
2007	Denver	9	15	1	1	17	3	0	1	1	0	0	1	0	1
2008	Denver	9	16	2	0	18	6	2.5	0	0	0	0	0	0	0
MLL Totals		24	36	3	8	47	20	2.5	1	1	0	0	1	0	1
