= De La Salle North Catholic High School =

- 4300 NE Killingsworth Street; Portland, Oregon 97218, USA

Information
- Type: Private, Catholic, coed
- Motto: Enter to Learn, Leave to Serve
- Religious affiliation: Roman Catholic
- Established: 2001; 25 years ago
- President: Ashleigh de Villiers
- Grades: 9-12
- Color: Black - Silver - Carolina blue
- Athletics conference: OSAA Northwest League, 3A
Sports
Basketball Volleyball	Soccer; Track & Field
- Mascot: Knight
- Team name: Knights
- Accreditation: Northwest Accreditation Commission
- Affiliation: Cristo Rey Network; De La Salle Christian Brothers
- Website: www.delasallenorth.org

De La Salle North High School is a private, coeducational, Roman Catholic high school in Portland, Oregon, United States. It is a part of the Roman Catholic Archdiocese of Portland. The school is located in the Cully neighborhood, co-locating with the St. Charles Parish; De La Salle renovated the old parish elementary school wing and built a commons, courtyard and gymnasium. The doors to the new campus were opened on September 7, 2021.

== Background ==
De La Salle North Catholic High School was founded in 2001. It is sponsored by the De La Salle Christian Brothers and is a part of the Roman Catholic Archdiocese of Portland in Oregon. The founding president was Matthew D. Powell. The current president is Ashleigh de Villiers, and the current interim principal is Maria Cabrera. De La Salle was one of the founding members of the Cristo Rey Network of high schools, the first school after Cristo Rey Jesuit High School Chicago to follow this model. By 2018, there were 37 schools in the network.

De La Salle North Catholic serves young men and women of the Portland metro area with limited resources. The school turns no one away because of an inability to pay. An integrated Corporate Work Study Program enables students to earn a large portion of their tuition. Students attend class four days a week and work for a local company one day, gaining work experience, business contacts, and preparing them for education at a four-year college.

== Activities ==
Clubs sponsored by the school have included Anime, Art, Chess, Earth, Hiking, Latinx, Magic, Math, Poetry, Sci Fi, Spectrum. Other activities have included: cheerleading, Peer Helpers, Student Council, and Constitution Team. Service projects, retreats, and leadership opportunities are offered through the Lasallian Youth Ministry department.

== Sports ==
The mascot of the school is a knight.

In 2004, after four years in existence, the De La Salle Knights boys soccer team finished second in the Oregon 2A state playoffs of the Oregon School Activities Association. They defeated the Oregon Episcopal School Aardvarks in the regional playoffs, but then lost 0–5 to Catlin Gabel in the championship game. In 2017, the De La Salle Knights' boy soccer team ranked 5th in state. The boys soccer team would reach the playoffs facing The Delphian School. The boys soccer team will end up winning 1-0. Next up they would face the 4th rank St. Mary's School (Medford, Oregon), the game would finish 2-2, De La Salle defeated St. Mary's in extra time. For the first time since 2004, the De La Salle Knights Boys soccer team would reach the OSAA 3A/2A/1A semifinals but would end up losing to the eventually state champions Riverside Junior/Senior High School 4–0.

In 2014, the Knights' boys' basketball team finished second in Oregon 3A state playoffs, losing to rival Valley Catholic. Reaching the state playoffs again in 2015, the Knights finished in 4th place. Then in 2016, the Knights' boys' basketball team finished second, losing to St. Mary's of Medford in the championship game.

=== State championships ===
- Boys Basketball: 2018, 2019
