= Providence Cristo Rey High School =

Location
- 2717 S. East Street; Indianapolis, Indiana, (Marion County) 46225; United States

Information
- Type: Private, coeducational
- Religious affiliations: Roman Catholic, Cristo Rey Network
- Established: 2007
- President: Tyler Mayer
- Principal: Beth Desalvo
- Grades: 9–12
- Colors: Blue, white and green
- Slogan: College-ready. Career-prepared.
- Sports: Cross country, girls volleyball, boys volleyball, boys soccer, girls soccer, girls basketball, boys basketball, boys wrestling, girls wrestling, softball, baseball, track & field, cheer
- Mascot: Wolves
- Website: www.cristoreyindy.org

Providence Cristo Rey High School is a private, Roman Catholic high school in Indianapolis, Indiana. Opened in 2007 as a part of the Cristo Rey Network, it is located in the Roman Catholic Archdiocese of Indianapolis and is sponsored by the Sisters of Providence of Saint Mary-of-the-Woods.

== Background ==
In 2007 under the leadership of General Superior Sister Ann Margaret O'Hara, the Sisters of Providence decided to found a high school in Indianapolis which focuses on low-income, minority students. Providence Cristo Rey HS opened in August 2007 and graduated its first class in 2010. It is part of the Cristo Rey Network of high schools, the original being Cristo Rey Jesuit High School in Chicago. Students are placed with more than 93 corporations to earn part of their tuition. For transport, school busses have more than 50 pickup spots and also convey students to their places of work. The school has a collection of videos presenting the experience of students.

The school is accredited by the Indiana Department of Education and AdvancED. On May 23, 2017, it was visited by the US Secretary of Education Betsy DeVos who touted Indiana for being the leading state in granting vouchers for students to attend private schools. The media pointed out that Cristo Rey was the exception, where vouchers were going to the underserved populace. The voucher system on top of work study enables the school to spend $16,000 per student per year to further enhance their education through longer school days, a longer school year, and a better teachers per student average. as well as an internship program that runs the whole year. When asked to encapsulate their experience, a student suggested that others not miss the experience "because it really is life-changing".

== Activities ==
While students of all faiths are welcome at the school, four years of theology class, attendance at school Masses, and annual retreats are a part of every student's schedule.

The robotics club has won awards at state competitions and the DECA entrepreneurship club has also done well at the state level. The athletes have found success, especially in soccer and basketball.

== See also ==
- List of schools in Indianapolis
- List of high schools in Indiana
