= L. J. Figueroa =

Dominican-American basketball player

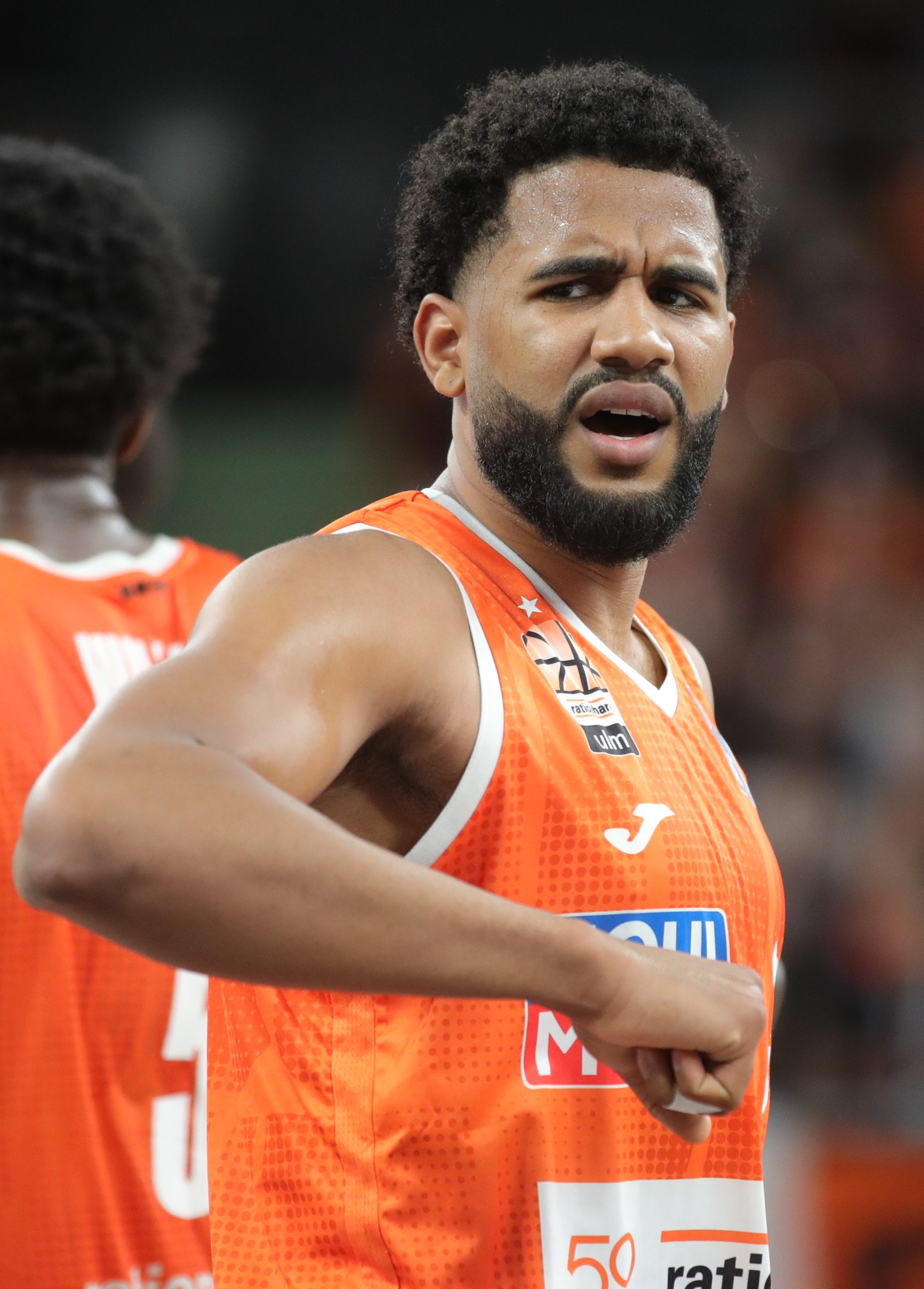
- Figueroa with Ratiopharm Ulm in 2023

No. 30 – Maccabi Ramat Gan
- Position: Small forward
- League: Israeli Basketball Premier League

Personal information
- Born: March 28, 1998 (age 28) Lawrence, Massachusetts, U.S.
- Listed height: 6 ft 6 in (1.98 m)
- Listed weight: 200 lb (91 kg)

Career information
- High school: Notre Dame Cristo Rey (Lawrence, Massachusetts); Lawrence (Lawrence, Massachusetts); Oldsmar Christian School (Oldsmar, Florida); West Oaks Academy (Orlando, Florida)
- College: Odessa (2017–2018); St. John's (2018–2020); Oregon (2020–2021)
- NBA draft: 2021: undrafted
- Playing career: 2021–present

Career history
- 2021: Leones de Santo Domingo
- 2021–2022: Santa Cruz Warriors
- 2022–2023: South Bay Lakers
- 2023: Grises de Humacao
- 2023–2024: ratiopharm ulm
- 2024: Básquet Coruña
- 2025: Aris Thessaloniki
- 2025–2026: Mexico City Capitanes
- 2026: Hapoel Be'er Sheva
- 2026–present: Maccabi Ironi Ramat Gan

Career highlights
- LNB champion (2021); First-team NJCAA DI All-American (2018); WJCAC Player of the Year (2018); All-WJCAC Team (2018); WJCAC Freshman of the Year (2018)
- Stats at NBA.com
- Stats at Basketball Reference

Lionel Junior Figueroa Mercado (born March 28, 1998) is a Dominican–American professional basketball player for Maccabi Ironi Ramat Gan of the Israeli Basketball Premier League. He played college basketball for the Odessa Wranglers (with whom he was a First-team NJCAA DI All-American, the St. John's Red Storm, and the Oregon Ducks.

== High school career ==
Figueroa was born in Lawrence, Massachusetts.

As a freshman, Figueroa played basketball for Notre Dame Cristo Rey High School in Lawrence. For his sophomore season, he transferred to Lawrence High School in Lawrence to seek better competition but was relegated to junior varsity. He then transferred to Oldsmar Christian School in Oldsmar, Florida, where he repeated his sophomore year and grew four inches (10 cm). Figueroa was drawn there by coach Alex Arias. For his senior season, he moved to West Oaks Academy in Orlando, Florida. Figueroa was a four-star recruit and committed to play college basketball for New Mexico State over offers from Florida, Miami (Florida) and Louisville, among others.

== College career ==
Before playing a game for New Mexico State, Figueroa left the program due to a coaching change. He played for Odessa College during his freshman season. Figueroa averaged 21.4 points, 5.5 rebounds, and 3.7 assists per game, while shooting 48.2 percent from three-point range, and earned First Team National Junior College Athletic Association Division I All-American honors. He was also named Western Junior College Athletic Conference (WJCAC) Player of the Year and Freshman of the Year.

For his sophomore season, Figueroa transferred to St. John's. On November 27, 2018, he scored a sophomore season-high 25 points and collected 13 rebounds in an 85–64 win against Maryland Eastern Shore. As a sophomore, Figueroa averaged 14.4 points, 6.4 rebounds and 1.7 assists per game. He entered the transfer portal following the departure of coach Chris Mullin before returning to St. John's. On January 25, 2020, Figueroa scored a junior season-high 28 points with seven three-pointers in a 79–66 win over DePaul. As a junior, he averaged 14.5 points, 4.5 rebounds, 2.1 assists and a Big East-leading 1.9 steals per game. However, Figueroa struggled with his shooting under new coach Mike Anderson, making 37.9 percent of his attempts from the floor.

After initially declaring for the 2020 NBA draft, Figueroa decided to return to college and transfer to Oregon for his senior season. He was granted a waiver for immediate eligibility on December 3. As a senior, Figueroa averaged 12.3 points and a team-high 6.1 rebounds per game, while finishing third on the team with 41 steals. Following the season, he opted to turn professional rather than take advantage of the additional season of eligibility the NCAA granted due to the COVID-19 pandemic.

== Professional career ==
After going undrafted in the 2021 NBA draft, Figueroa joined the Dallas Mavericks for NBA Summer League play.

=== Leones de Santo Domingo (2021) ===
In August, he signed with Leones de Santo Domingo of the Dominican Liga Nacional de Baloncesto, helping them win the LNB Championship.

=== Santa Cruz Warriors (2021–2022) ===
On October 13, 2021, Figueroa signed with the Golden State Warriors. However, he was waived three days later. In October 2021, Figueroa joined the Santa Cruz Warriors as an affiliate player. On January 10, 2022, he had 17 points and 13 rebounds and hit the game-winning basket at the buzzer in a 132–130 overtime win over the Memphis Hustle.

=== South Bay Lakers (2022–2023) ===
On October 8, 2022, Figueroa signed with the Los Angeles Lakers. He was waived two days later.

On October 22, 2022, Figueroa joined the South Bay Lakers training camp roster.

=== Grises de Humacao (2023) ===
On April 2, 2023, Figueroa signed with Grises de Humacao of the Puerto Rican league. In 16 games he averaged 17.7 points, 4.8 rebounds, 2.0 assists, 1.2 steals (10th in the league), and 28.9 minutes per game as he shot 55.4% from the floor and 80.0% from the free throw line.

=== ratiopharm Ulm (2023–2024) ===
On July 27, 2023, Figueroa signed with ratiopharm Ulm of the German Basketball Bundesliga. In 61 games he averaged 12.7 points, 3.3 rebounds, 1.3 assists, 1.5 steals, and 24.8 minutes per game as he shot 52.8% from the floor and 41.6% from three point range.

=== CB Coruna (2024) ===
On August 5, 2024, he signed with CB Coruna in the Liga ACB in Spain. In 11 games he averaged 6.2 points, 2.6 rebounds, 0.9 assists, 0.8 steals, and 14.0 minutes per game.

=== Aris Midea Thessaloniki (2025) ===
On December 31, 2024, he signed with Aris Midea Thessaloniki of the Greek HEBA A1, and played 19 games for the team.

=== Mexico City Capitanes (2025) ===
In 2025 he played for the Mexico City Capitanes in the G League. In 46 games he averaged 12.8 points, 4.6 rebounds, 2.1 assists, 1.8 steals, and 24.1 minutes per game, shooting 55.1% from the floor and 42.2% from three-point range.

=== Hapoel Be'er Sheva (2025–2026) ===
In 2025-26, he played for Hapoel Be'er Sheva of the Israeli Basketball Premier League, in 10 games averaging 18.7 points, 3.5 rebounds, 2.4 assists, 1.4 steals, and 26.4 minutes per game, while shooting 40.9% from three-point range.

=== Ironi Ramat Gan (2026–present) ===
In 2026-27 he is playing for Maccabi Ironi Ramat Gan of the Israeli Basketball Premier League.

== National team career ==
Figueroa represented the Dominican Republic at the 2016 FIBA Americas Under-18 Championship, averaging 14.6 points and 5.2 rebounds per game. He played for the Dominican Republic at the 2019 Pan American Games.

== Career statistics ==
Legend
GP	Games played	GS	Games started	MPG	Minutes per game
FG%	Field goal percentage	3P%	3-point field goal percentage	FT%	Free throw percentage
RPG	Rebounds per game	APG	Assists per game	SPG	Steals per game
BPG	Blocks per game	PPG	Points per game	**Bold**	Career high

=== College ===
==== NCAA Division I ====
Year	Team	GP	GS	MPG	FG%	3P%	FT%	RPG	APG	SPG	BPG	PPG
2018–19	St. John's	**34**	**32**	**32.0**	**.513**	**.383**	.627	**6.4**	1.7	1.8	.2	14.4
2019–20	St. John's	32	**32**	28.3	.379	.365	.663	4.5	**2.1**	**1.9**	**.5**	**14.5**
2020–21	Oregon	26	21	31.3	.467	.377	**.667**	6.1	1.4	1.6	.3	12.3
Career		92	85	30.5	.449	.374	.651	5.6	1.8	1.8	.3	13.9

==== JUCO ====
Year	Team	GP	GS	MPG	FG%	3P%	FT%	RPG	APG	SPG	BPG	PPG
2017–18	Odessa	33	32	24.2	.555	.482	.726	5.5	3.7	1.2	.4	21.4

== Personal life ==
Figueroa is the son of Leo Figueroa and Gleny Mercado. His mother played volleyball for Florida Memorial College.
