= Cristo Rey New York High School =

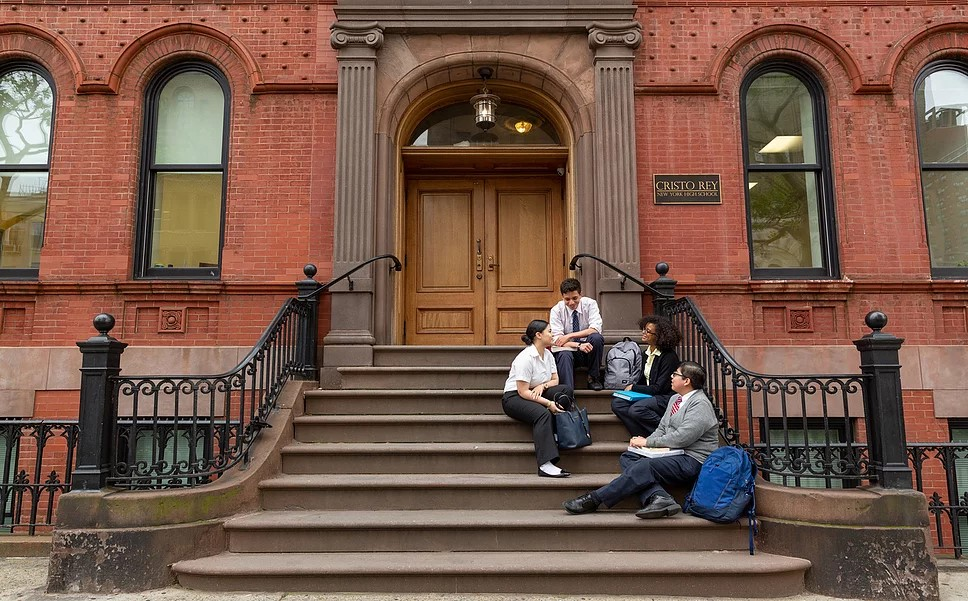

Location
- 112 East 106th Street (East Harlem, Manhattan); New York City, New York 10029; United States
- 40°47′33″N 73°56′50″W

Information
- Type: Roman Catholic, coeducational
- Motto: The School That Works
- Established: 2004 (22 years ago)
- Founder: Fr. Joseph Parkes, SJ; Bill Ford
- President: Daniel Dougherty
- Dean: Rose Batista (students), Brendan Faughnan (faculty)
- Principal: Dr. Fran Clemente
- Grades: 9–12
- Campus type: Urban
- Colors: Red and white
- Song: "Cristo Rey Alma Mater"
- Team name: Lions/Lady Lions
- Newspaper: Mane Stream
- Tuition: $2,000 ($1,185 avgerage paid)
- Affiliation: Cristo Rey Network
- Website: cristoreyny.org

Cristo Rey New York High School is an American college preparatory, Catholic high school located in the East Harlem neighborhood of the Manhattan borough of New York City, New York.

It is a member of the Cristo Rey Network of schools.

The school follows a unique Corporate Work Study Model, which allows students to spend one day per week interning with multinational corporations, including McKinsey, Pfizer, American Express, and JPMorgan Chase.

Since its opening in 2004, the school has produced 943 alumni.

== History ==
The school was established in 2004 as a collaborative effort between the Sisters of the Holy Child Jesus, the De La Salle Christian Brothers, and the Jesuits.

It functions in a low-income area of Manhattan to serve families who cannot afford private-school tuition, serving students from under-served elementary and middle schools who may be behind on standardized tests.

The co-founders of the school were Fr. Joseph Parkes, a member of the Society of Jesus and president of the school until 2018, and Bill Ford, the principal of the school until 2019 and nephew of martyr Ita Ford. For his 13 years of involvement with the school, Fr. Parkes received the Catholic Extension Society Spirit of Francis Award in 2017.

Cristo Rey New York is the fifth member of the Cristo Rey Network of high schools, the original being Cristo Rey Jesuit High School in Chicago, Illinois.

There are 37 Cristo Rey schools in the United States, all of which exclusively serve students from low-income families. Other Cristo Rey Schools in the New York Metropolitan area are Cristo Rey Brooklyn High School and Cristo Rey Newark High School.

The school's building at 112 East 106th Street is part of St. Cecilia's Church and Convent, which is listed on the National Register of Historic Places.

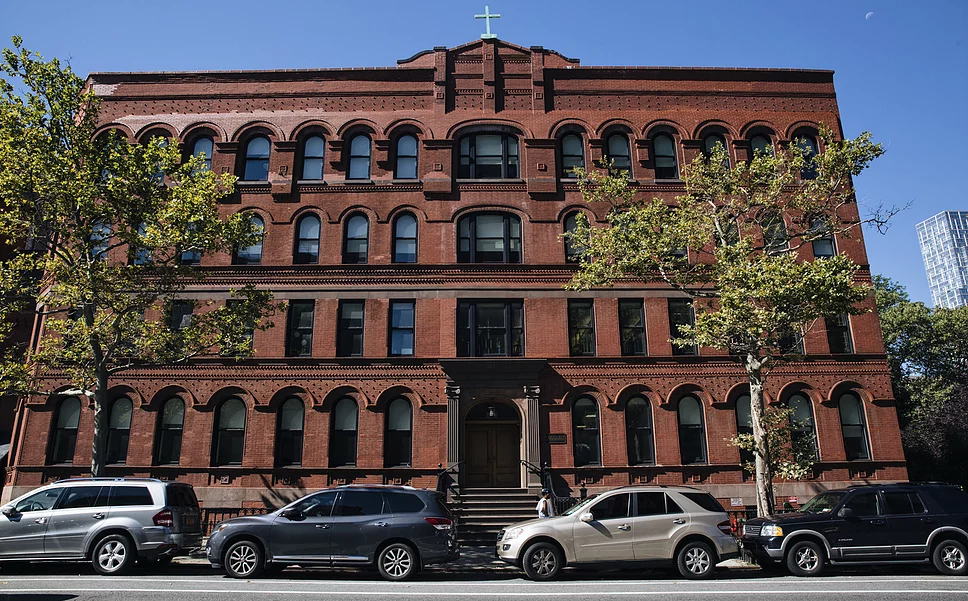
Cristo Rey New York High School building – listed on the National Register of Historic Places

== General Information ==
=== Tuition and financials ===
The school boasts the lowest tuition for a private school in Manhattan at $2,000 per year. The actual operating costs for Cristo Rey education total more than $17,000 per student. After financial aid, the average amount paid per student is $1,185, which covers around ten percent of their education. About 40 percent of these operating costs are funded by income earned by students through Corporate Work Study Program jobs, while grants and private donations cover the final 50 percent of costs.

=== Demographics ===
The school serves a 377-person student body that is 75 percent Hispanic, 20 percent African American, and five percent other ethnicities. Most of these students have attended underserved elementary and middle schools, and their academic performance entering high school is predominantly below grade level. The average family income of students is $31,015.

=== Curriculum and academics ===
The school has three main components to its curriculum: college readiness, college access, and college success. A major focus of the school is raising standardized test scores and preparing students for a rigorous college education.

The school also ensures that all students have access to college by providing assistance throughout the entire college application process and ensuring that students obtain sufficient financial aid.

The school. has a 14:1 student-to-faculty ratio.

=== Alumni success ===
The school has produced tremendous results in its history. Its 98 percent college enrollment rate is double the national average for low-income students, and its 83 percent college graduation rate is more than five times the national average for students of the same peer group.

Virtually all the school's graduates will become first-generation college students.

== Corporate Work Study Program ==
The Corporate Work Study Program is a distinguishing component of all Cristo Rey schools. Students work one day per week in entry-level positions at an assigned company. The goal is for students to acquire job experience and marketable skills, develop a network of business contacts, gain exposure to a wide variety of career opportunities, and improve in their work ethic and self-esteem. Work is considered part of the curriculum; if a student is dismissed from their job, they are considered to have failed that course.

According to Father Joseph Parkes, former president of the school, Cristo Rey High School was "founded around a work-study program, so that, in effect, the school would function like a temp agency". The students, who are 98 percent black and Latino, serve as a "diversity pipeline" for the corporations, while the students' salaries constitute much of the school's operating costs. The students gain "a good deal of poise", in addition to clerical skills. Some are offered summer jobs, for which they can earn extra compensation. Each student earns about $6,500 per year through their Corporate Work Study Program job, which goes directly towards their education costs.

Students of Cristo Rey New York work at more than 140 corporate partners throughout the New York metropolitan area. These partners include:

A breakdown of the various sectors in which CRNYHS students work

- American Express
- Archdiocese of New York
- Brookfield Properties
- Blackstone
- CBS Global Distribution Group
- Citigroup
- HarperCollins
- ING
- JPMorgan Chase
- KPMG
- Major League Baseball (MLB)
- McKinsey & Company
- MetLife
- Michael Kors
- Morgan Stanley
- Mount Sinai Hospitals
- New York Supreme Court – Appellate Division
- Pfizer
- PricewaterhouseCoopers
- Sidley Austin
- Skadden, Arps, Slate, Meagher & Flom

== Extracurricular activities and other programs ==
The school has a full-time volunteer program that employs eight college-graduate volunteers who make a two-year commitment to the school. These volunteers help the school in various ways through assistant teaching, fundraising, moderating extra-curricular activities, coaching, and training and chaperoning students for the Corporate Work Study Program. Volunteers live together in apartments provided by the school and are remunerated for ordinary expenses.

Clubs sponsored by the school include: Art Club, Black History Month committee, Choir, Dance Team, Drama Club, Lions Unite in a Pride (formally GSA), Minds over Matter (STEM Club), MIMA (Modern Improvisational Music Appreciation Group), Student Council, Urban Exploration Club, Yearbook Club, and the student-leadership programs Big Brothers/Big Sisters and Peer Mentors.

Sports sponsored by the school include: baseball (boys), basketball (boys and girls), cross-country (boys and girls), soccer (boys and girls), softball (girls), and volleyball (girls).
