= Christ the King Jesuit College Prep High School =

Private school in Chicago, Illinois, United States

Christ the King Jesuit College Preparatory School

Location
- 5088 West Jackson Boulevard; Chicago, Illinois 60644; United States; 41°52′38″N 87°45′6″W

Information
- Type: Private, Jesuit
- Motto: Men and Women for Others
- Denomination: Catholic
- Established: 2008; 18 years ago
- President: Clement V. Martin
- Principal: Katie Olson
- Grades: 9–12
- Gender: Co-ed
- Enrollment: 380 (2022-2023)
- Average class size: 23
- Student to teacher ratio: 16:1
- Colors: Gold and Maroon
- Mascot: Gladiators
- Team name: Lady G's /Gladiators
- Accreditation: North Central Association of Colleges and Schools (in process)
- Tuition: $2,400
- Affiliation: Cristo Rey Network
- Website: ctkjesuit

Christ the King Jesuit College Preparatory School (CTK) is a private, Catholic high school in Chicago, Illinois, founded by the Society of Jesus (Jesuits). Pursuing the Cristo Rey model inaugurated by Cristo Rey Jesuit in Chicago, students earn nearly 75% of their tuition by working at one of the 96 job partners listed on the website.

== Snapshot ==
Part of the Cristo Rey Network of schools, CTK opened in 2008 and graduated its first class in 2012. In 2013 there were 302 students, 97% African American, 62% female. In 2017 89% of students were eligible for the federal free/reduced lunch program and the medium family income of freshmen was $19,752. All members of its first four graduating classes were accepted into college and 80% of graduates remained in college in 2015.

There are 50 full-time staff plus 7 drivers (for work assignments). CTK has 26 classrooms, 3 science labs, and innovation center, makerspace, art and music / band rooms, environmental "green" roof, and award-winning chapel with all seating facing each other from two sides of the central sanctuary.

Extracurricular activities include Daughters of Imani, Drama Club, National Honor Society, Peer Ministry, Student Action Leadership Team (SALT), Student Council, Video Game Club, and Yearbook. Christ the King, a member of the Chicago College Prep Conference, offers both boys and girls 8 different sports at the varsity and JV level. Boys' basketball completed the 2015–2016 season with a 14-1 record.

== Christian formation ==
Each year includes a retreat experience for all the students. Freshmen have an all-day retreat that helps them become comfortable with the changes, challenges, and new commitment that many of them face. The sophomore retreat is off-campus, an all-day reflection on building and maintaining positive relationships with friends, family, and God. The junior retreat is overnight, two full days, boys and girls separately participating in faith-based discussions and activities that touch the spirit, lead to reflection, and foster deeper relationships. The Kairos model is employed for the senior, three-day retreat, with two nights off campus. Trained adults and student leaders direct the retreat.

Christ the King offers various service opportunities and it is the students' responsibility to select from these options and fulfill their required hours, rising from freshman to senior year from 15 to 20 to 25 to 30 hours in the year. Service hours count for 10% of the students' Religious Studies grade.
