= Don Bosco Cristo Rey High School =

Private school in Takoma Park, Maryland, United States

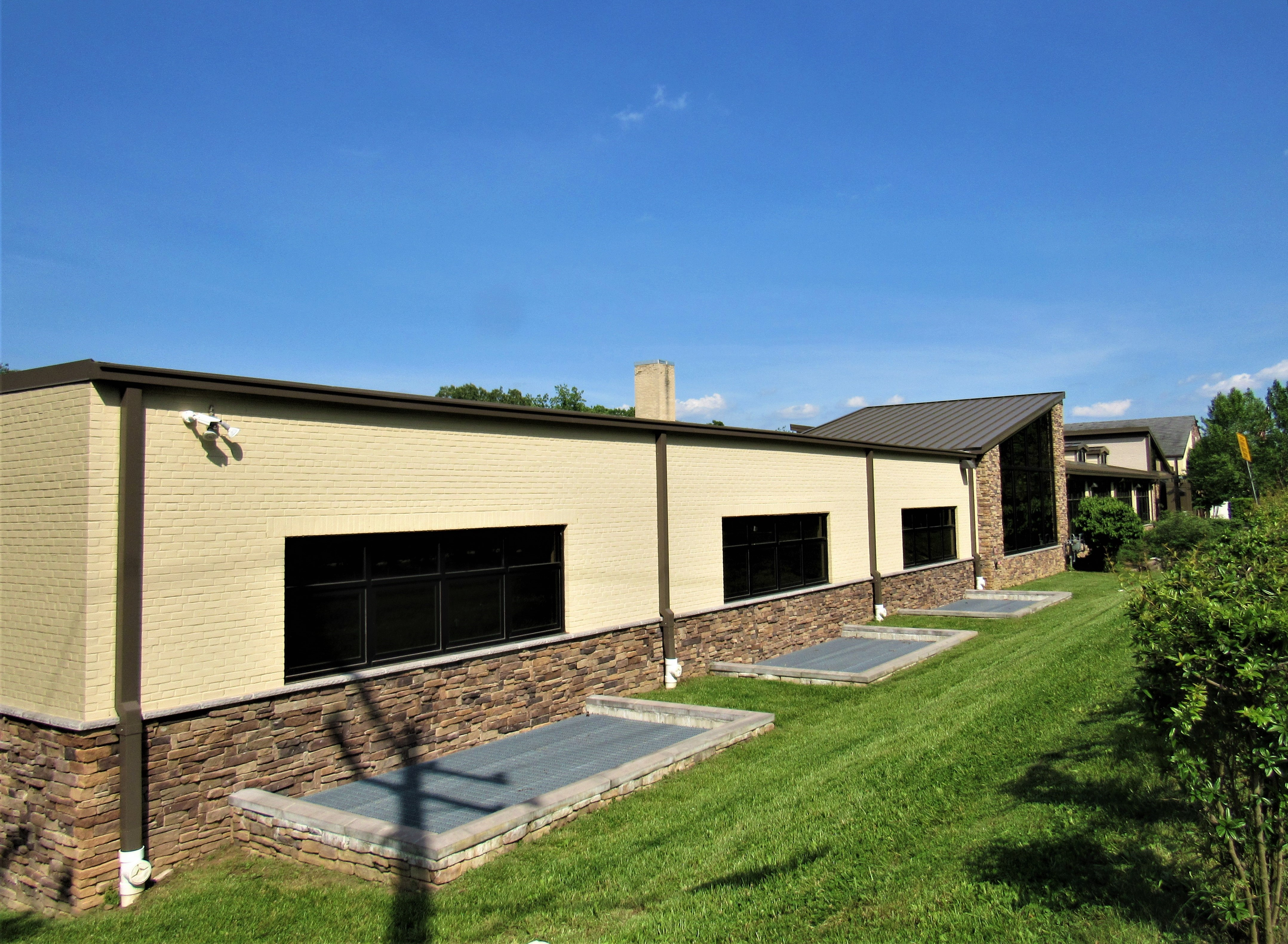

Location
- 1010 Larch Avenue; Takoma Park, Montgomery County, Maryland 20912; United States; 38°58′40″N 76°59′28″W

Information
- Type: Private, Coeducational
- Motto: "Be who you are and be it well."
- Religious affiliations: Roman Catholic; Salesian
- Established: August 28, 2007; 19 years ago
- Founder: Fr. Steve Shafran, SDB
- School district: Archdiocese of Washington Catholic Schools
- CEEB code: 210997
- President: Mark K. Shriver
- Principal: Cody Yocom
- Grades: 9–12
- Enrollment: 420 (2026)
- Colors: Black and Gold
- Mascot: Wolfpack
- Nickname: DBCR
- Affiliation: Cristo Rey Network
- Work study director: Kevin Sullivan
- Website: dbcr.org

Don Bosco Cristo Rey High School and Corporate Work Study Program is a private Catholic high school in Takoma Park, Maryland. It is cosponsored by the Roman Catholic Archdiocese of Washington and the Salesians of Don Bosco.

== Background ==
The school is named for St. John Bosco, founder of the Salesian order, and is part of a national Cristo Rey network of 28 schools. It offers a challenging college-preparatory academic program and fully integrated work study program, in which students gain professional work experience at nearly 100 leading Washington, D.C. metropolitan area businesses and earn money to pay for a significant portion of their tuition. The school finished renovation in 2007, graduated its first class in 2011, and finished adding a new science wing in 2014.

Don Bosco Cristo Rey High School opened for classes on August 28, 2007, with 127 students enrolled. The school graduated its first class in 2011. It is part of the Cristo Rey Network of high schools, the original being Cristo Rey Jesuit High School in Chicago. The school is run by the Salesians of Don Bosco, and they run another Cristo Rey school in Tampa, Cristo Rey Tampa Salesian High School.

All students are from families with limited financial means, and each student works one day a week (Monday–Thursday). The jobs that the students are employed in help pay for the bulk of the tuition.

In 2014, the school completed construction of a new wing that will primarily serve science classes. Cardinal Donald Wuerl blessed the new wing in a ceremony on September 4, 2014.

The current president is Mark Shriver. The current principal is Cody Yocom. Kevin Sullivan is the Director of the Corporate Work Study Program. Shriver is also the school's first president who is a layperson
