= Catherine McAuley High School (Brooklyn) =

Location
- 710 East 37th Street; East Flatbush, Brooklyn, New York City, New York 11203; United States
- 40°38′22″N 73°56′30″W

Information
- Type: Private, All-Girls
- Motto: Spiritus Sancte Duc Nos Per Vitam (Holy Spirit, Lead Us Through Life)
- Religious affiliations: Roman Catholic; Sisters of Mercy
- Established: 1942
- Founder: Founding Principal: S. Mary Annunciata, RSM
- CEEB code: 330645
- Faculty: 32
- Grades: 9-12
- Colors: Maroon and Gold
- Slogan: "Preparing Women, Producing Leaders: Education for Life"
- Team name: Panthers
- Newspaper: The McAuleyan
- Yearbook: The Mercian
- School fees: $300
- Tuition: $6,300 (2012-13)
- Alumni: Nearly 9,000
- Website: mcauleybrooklyn.org (Archived)

Catherine McAuley High School was a small, all-girls', private, Catholic high school in the East Flatbush section of Brooklyn, New York City, New York. Founded by the Brooklyn Sisters of Mercy in 1942, it is located in the Roman Catholic Diocese of Brooklyn. It remains the only all-girls' Catholic high school in Brooklyn or Queens to have earned the Blue Ribbon Award from the US Department of Education.

McAuley closed at the end of the 2012–2013 school year. The closing was the result of declining enrollment due to changing demographics, the increasing number of charter schools, rising costs, and the economic downturn. The final commencement took place on Saturday, June 1, 2013. Cristo Rey Brooklyn High School is the current occupant of the campus.

== Background ==
The school was dedicated to "preparing young Christian women for life." The school was named for the woman who founded the Sisters of Mercy in 1831 in Dublin, Ireland, after she inherited the equivalent of $1 million from a former employer. She dedicated her life and her Sisters to serving the poor, sick and uneducated.

The school's original name was Catherine McAuley Commercial High School, and it was a continuation of the Mercy Commercial High School which was opened in 1919. Since the 1980s most McAuley graduates have continued their education, and the success of its college preparatory curriculum is evidenced by annual graduation and college acceptance rates near 100%. McAuley adhered to the New York State Curriculum guidelines and granted significant financial aid to many students. Numerous afterschool activities existed.

== Accomplishments ==
In 1991, the school earned the title Nationally Recognized School of Excellence from the US Department of Education. It was the only all-girls Catholic high school in Brooklyn or Queens to earn this distinction.

In 2002, Catherine McAuley High School was the first in New York City to offer a boarding program for teenagers. The program was administered in partnership with Boys Hope Girls Hope of New York, a nonprofit organization founded in 1977 which helps academically capable and motivated children from abuse, neglect or otherwise at-risk situations to meet their full potential by providing value-centered, family-like homes, opportunities, and education through college. McAuley Convent, home to many Sisters of Mercy from 1950 to 2001, served as a dormitory for over 40 students five days per week. Students in the boarding program, referred to as "Scholars," were expected to maintain an 85 GPA and follow a disciplined course of study for their academic and moral development.
