= Detroit Cristo Rey High School =

Detroit Cristo Rey
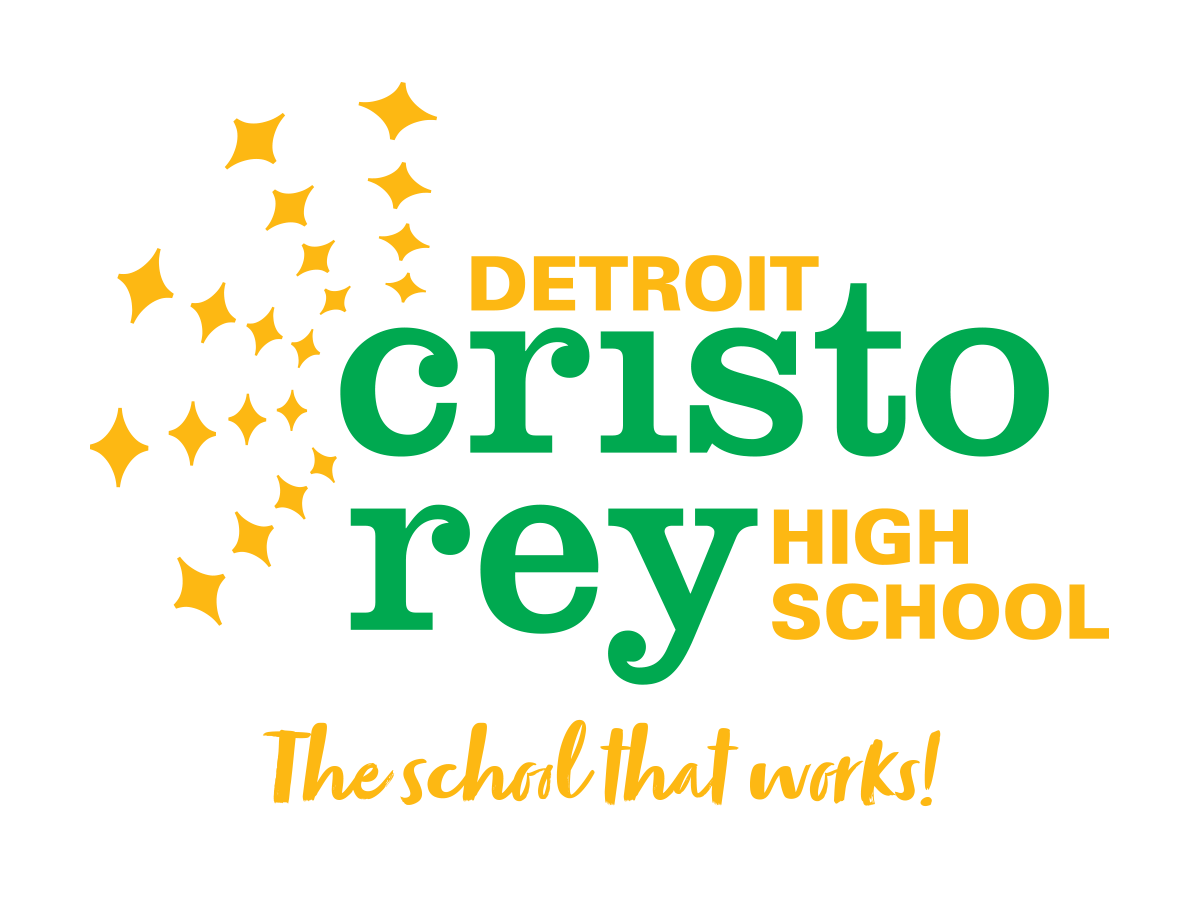

Location
- 5679 West Vernor Highway, Detroit, Michigan; Wayne County, USA 48209-2157; 42°19′2″N 83°6′9″W

Information
- Type: Private, Cristo Rey Network
- Established: 2008
- School district: Roman Catholic Archdiocese of Detroit
- President: William R. McGrail
- Principal: Karla Gudiño
- Grades: 9–12, coeducational
- Colors: Green and Gold
- Athletics conference: Catholic High School League
- Sports: Basketball, Track, Cross Country, Volleyball.
- Team name: Wolves
- Website: detroitcristorey.org

Detroit Cristo Rey High School is a private, coeducational, Roman Catholic high school in Detroit, Michigan, in the West Vernor-Junction Historic District. It opened in August 2008 and operates within the Roman Catholic Archdiocese of Detroit.

== Description ==
The high school building is part of the Most Holy Redeemer Church parish. It is co-sponsored by the Sisters, Servants of the Immaculate Heart of Mary and The Congregation of St. Basil. The school is located in the former Holy Redeemer High School building. It is the only coeducational Catholic high school in the city of Detroit, and is open to students of all faiths.

Detroit Cristo Rey High School opened August 2008 with an initial freshman class of about 100 and graduated its first class in 2012. It is part of the Cristo Rey Network of high schools nationwide, the original being Cristo Rey Jesuit High School in Chicago. The founding president of Detroit Cristo Rey was Earl J. Robinson, a past president of Lees-McRae College. The Board of Trustees named Michael Khoury president in 2009. Its founding principal was Susan Rowe, a former teacher and administrator at University of Detroit Jesuit High School.

== Admissions, tuition, demographics ==
A student admitted in the ninth grade must be able to read at a seventh grade level; students unable to meet this requirement may not be admitted.

Cristo Rey schools are designed for children from low-income families. Each school has a maximum income cap for applicants. Detroit Cristo Rey has a standard tuition of $2,300/year but many families work at the school to lower their tuition costs to around $1,000/year.

During its first year (2008–2009), Detroit Cristo Rey had a student body that was approximately 50 percent African-American and 40 percent Hispanic. Approximately 50 percent of the student body was Catholic.

== Local Support ==
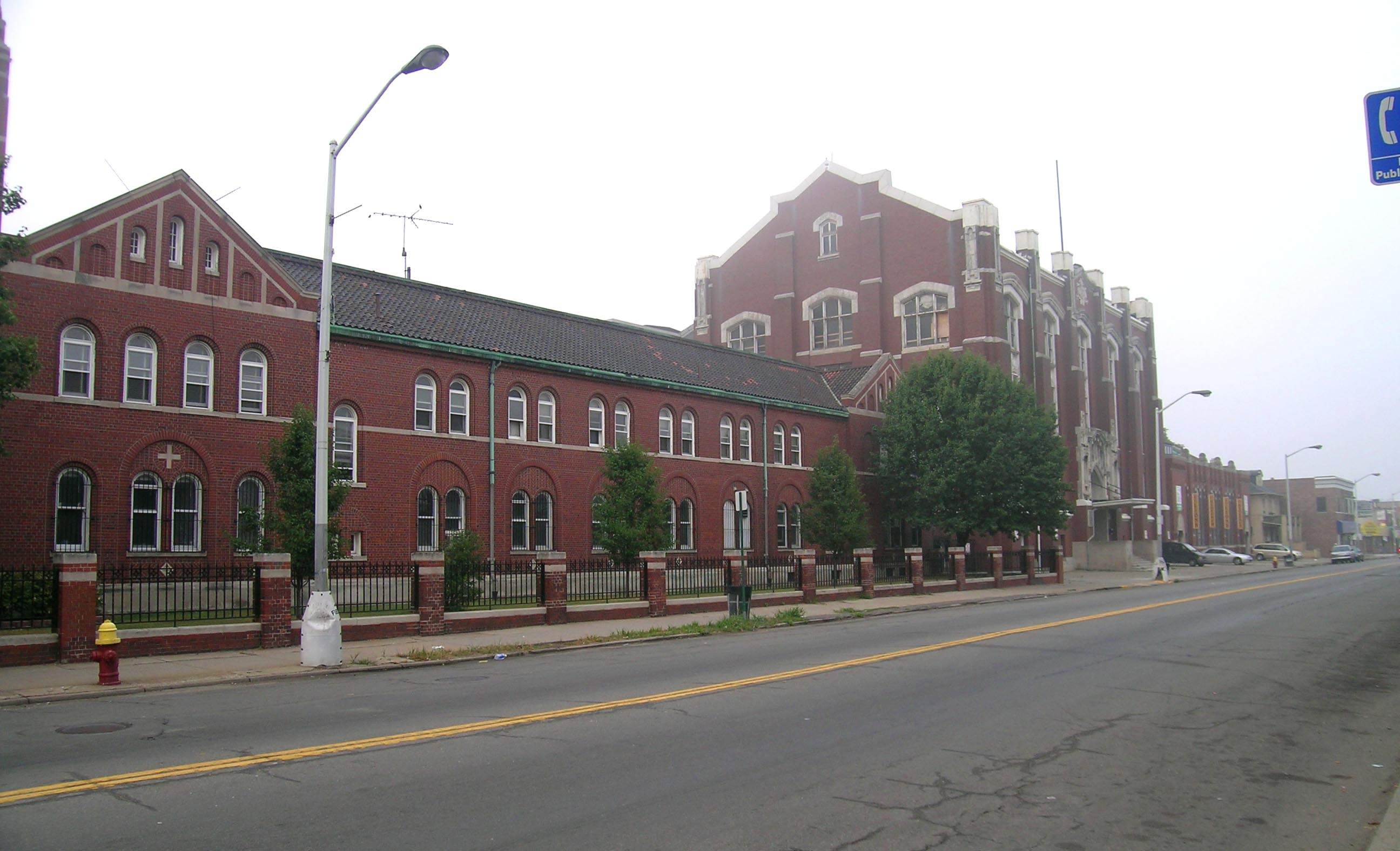
South side of Vernor at Junction, looking west

In 2009, Detroit Cristo Rey High School received grants from The Skillman Foundation ($900,000), the McGregor Fund ($75,000), and the Community Foundation for Southeast Michigan.

Students collaborated with Detroit Institute of Arts Art studio instructor Vito Valdez to create a mural representing the school and community.

== Corporate Work Study Program ==
Cristo Rey Network schools utilize a unique work study program that pairs students and local businesses. Students work one day a week at a local business while their wages are paid to the school for their tuition. In the 2009–2010 school year, "About 35 employers and 120 freshmen and sophomores are involved, and the program covered about 35 to 40 percent of the school's total expenses."

== Activities ==
All students participate in an off-site retreat each year, which for seniors runs overnight. Students contribute over 40 hours of community service during their four years.
