= Cristo Rey Jesuit Seattle High School =

Coordinates: 47°30′38″N 122°15′44″W

Location
- 10001 57th Avenue South; Seattle, (King County), Washington 98178; United States

Information
- Type: Private
- Religious affiliations: Roman Catholic; Jesuit
- Grades: 9-12
- Campus type: Urban
- Colors: Navy blue & yellow
- Mascot: Wolf
- Website: https://www.cristoreyseattle.org/

Cristo Rey Jesuit Seattle High School (CRJS) is a private, Jesuit high school located in the Rainier Beach neighborhood of Seattle, Washington, United States. It is part of the Cristo Rey Network, a network of work-study programs that aims to make Jesuit education accessible to low-income families.

== History ==
The school welcomed its inaugural class in August 2024. On the second day of school, students gathered for a "draft day" event at Seattle University in which each student learned their work-study placement.

In August 2026, the Vatican approved the sale of St. Paul School campus, including the historical parish convent and rectory, to Cristo Rey Jesuit Seattle. The school intends to renovate the old school building and build a new academic center, planning to open the new building in 2027, when the inaugural cohort begins their senior year.

== Corporate Work Study ==
Cristo Rey Jesuit Seattle partners with 55 Seattle-area corporations to provide each student with an entry-level, professional job. Students work five days each month to gain job skills, earn money for themselves, and offset the cost of their education. Their local corporate partners Costco, Microsoft and Alaska Airlines.
