= Colegio Cristo Rey =

Coordinates: 25°17′13.55″S 57°38′46.66″W

Location
- 941 Av. Ygatimí; Asunción, Paraguay

Information
- Type: Private, Catholic, Jesuit
- Established: March 14, 1938; 88 years ago
- Founder: Benito Camelo
- Rector: F. Carlos Caballero
- Principal: Sebastián Tonina
- Grades: Kindergarten, 1-12
- Campus: Urban
- Colors: Green, navy blue, and gray
- Emblem: "Ser más para servir mejor".
- Website: xtorey

The Colegio Cristo Rey is a Jesuit elementary and secondary school located in the city of Asunción, Paraguay. It was founded in 1938.

== History ==
Although it was always the Society of Jesus' desire to return to the lands of such a rich mission, this was not achieved for more than a century and a half.

During the government of Don Carlos Antonio López, in 1843, a mission arrived from the Argentine-Chilean Jesuit Province with the desire to explore the possibilities of establishing a Jesuit House in Paraguay. This attempt failed due to disagreements with the government of Don Carlos A. López, even though the latter had expressed his desire for a Jesuit to be the tutor of his eldest son, Francisco Solano.

Later, in 1864, another mission arrived, but the dark clouds of the War of the Triple Alliance were already looming over the nation's horizon, and once again this mission was unable to establish a home in our country.

== News bits ==
- 2011 The girls of the college were involved in the FIFA football initiative.
- 2015 The financing of education had become a major issue: students from Cristo Rey College organize a national assembly with students from other schools and the National Union of Students of Paraguay Centers (UNEPY) in attendance. As a part of the Ignatian Works for Haiti international campaign, students in the primary school portrayed their solidarity with the Haitian youth through childlike drawings. On 11 July 2015 Pope Francis spoke at Cristo Rey College as a part of his Latin American tour.
- 2016 The college hosts national sports competitions for primary school students. The teaching method of Jesuit schools in Paraguay, drawing on the experience in Spain, seeks to evolve to an educational model that eliminates courses, exams, and schedules and revolutionizes teaching. In addition to Cristo Rey College, the new model will be implemented in three other schools in Paraguay, as well as in the network of centers called Fe y Alegría, located in the poorest neighborhoods of the Paraguayan capital.

== Notable alumni ==
- Horacio Cartes – President of Paraguay.
- Mario Ferreiro – Mayor of Asunción.
- Juan Carlos Maneglia – Filmmaker.

== See also ==
- Catholic Church in Paraguay
- Education in Paraguay
- List of Jesuit schools
