= DePaul Cristo Rey High School =

Coordinates: 39°8′46″N 84°32′8″W

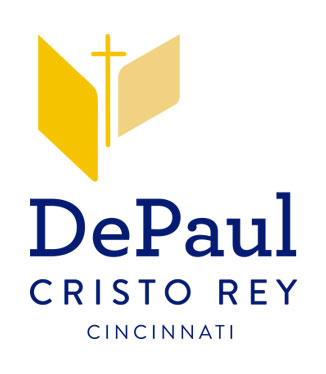

Location
- 3440 Central Pkwy; Cincinnati, Ohio 45225-1405, USA

Information
- Type: Private, college-preparatory, work-study, Roman Catholic
- Established: June 5, 2011
- School district: Roman Catholic Archdiocese of Cincinnati
- Authority: Sisters of Charity of Cincinnati
- President: Siobhan Taylor
- Principal: Jim Schurrer
- Grades: 9–12
- Gender: Co-ed
- Enrollment: 297 (2022-23)
- Campus: 10 acres, urban
- Colors: Blue and Gold
- Slogan: The School that Works for Cincinnati
- Mascot: Bruin
- Tuition: Sliding scale based on each family circumstances
- Affiliation: Cristo Rey Network
- Patron: St. Vincent de Paul
- Website: depaulcristorey.org

DePaul Cristo Rey High School (DPCR) is a private, college-preparatory high school located in the Clifton neighborhood of Cincinnati, Ohio, United States. The non-diocesan school, which opened June 5, 2011, is one of 37 Catholic high schools that serve the Archdiocese of Cincinnati. Named after St. Vincent de Paul, it is sponsored by the Sisters of Charity of Cincinnati as a member of the Cristo Rey Network of work-study schools.

== History ==
DePaul Cristo Rey is located one block south of Cincinnati State Technical and Community College at the former German-language Concordia Evangelical Lutheran Church (German: Concordia Evangelisch-Lutherisch Kirche), which disbanded on August 23, 2009, a year after closing its elementary school. In November 2009, the Sisters of Charity of Cincinnati purchased the building and grounds with the intention of establishing a Cristo Rey school.

DePaul Cristo Rey was dedicated June 5, 2011, and welcomed its first freshman class on August 17, 2011, to become Cincinnati's first new Catholic school since La Salle, Moeller, and McAuley High Schools opened in 1960.

== Work-study ==
Following the Cristo Rey model, DePaul Cristo Rey's Corporate Work Study Program (CWSP) partners with over 90 local businesses and community organizations in a one-of-a-kind program in Greater Cincinnati. Students go to school four days a week and work one day at a business or organization helping to finance their own private, college-prep high school education as they grow professionally and personally working side-by-side with adults in workplaces around the region. In the nine years since the first class graduated (in 2015), every senior, every year has been accepted to college.
