= Cristo Rey Kansas City High School =

Private coed school in Kansas City, Missouri, United States

Coordinates: 39°4′2″N 94°35′20″W

- Look forward to the good that is yet to Be

Location
- 211 West Linwood Boulevard; Kansas City, Missouri 64111, United States

Information
- Type: Private, college prep, coed
- Motto: Look Forward To The Good That Is Yet To Be
- Established: 2006; 20 years ago
- Oversight: Sisters of Charity, Catholic, Cristo Rey Network
- President: Claudia Meyer
- Principal: Christine Foster
- Staff: 27 (20 students per class)
- Grades: 9–12
- Campus type: Indoors
- Colors: Purple and gold
- Slogan: A School That Works!
- Athletics: Great Plains Conference
- Sports: Soccer, Volleyball, Basketball,
- Mascot: Puma
- Accreditation: North Central Association
- Tuition: Based on family ability to pay
- Admissions: Director, Selena Moran
- Website: www.cristoreykc.org

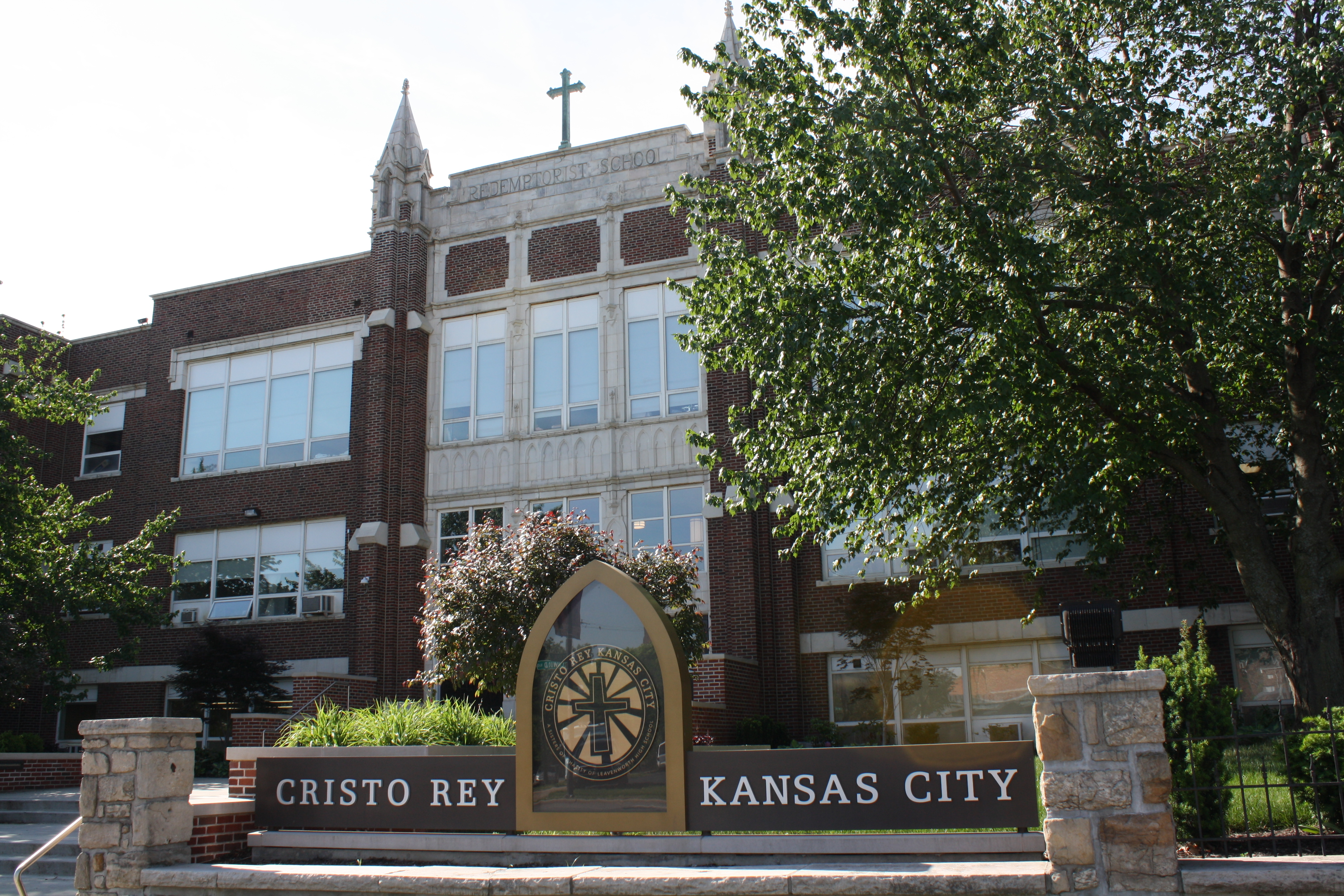
Sisters of Charity Cristo Rey KC

Cristo Rey Kansas City High School is a Roman Catholic high school founded by the Sisters of Charity of Leavenworth in 2006 as a part of the Cristo Rey Network of schools. It is located in Kansas City, Missouri, in the Roman Catholic Diocese of Kansas City-Saint Joseph.

== Background ==
In 2010, Cristo Rey graduated its first class. In that year and in subsequent years, 100% of its graduates were accepted to college.

Annually, the school hosts its own version of a "Dancing with the Stars" fundraiser, the event includes community leaders as celebrity stars. In 2012 students and faculty received a donation of 400 iPads. In 2013 and in 2016, Cristo Rey students were selected for the national Horatio Alger Scholar program, which honors outstanding students who have overcome early obstacles to their education.

== Activities ==
All students are offered retreat experience each year, and in senior year the three-day Kairos retreat.

The voluntary service requirement for all students is 20 hours each year. A special feature of the school's service program is its annual Community Service Day. The school also hosts university students doing voluntary service projects.

The following clubs are active at the school: Art Club, Cheerleading, Drum Line, FIRST Robotics Competition, Interact of Rotary International, National Hispanic Honor Society, National Honor Society, No Place For Hate, Peer Counselors, Student Ambassadors, and Student Council. A popular extracurricular is being one of the CRKC Student Dancers and a part of their hip hop performance.

The school is a member of the Missouri State High School Activities Association and fields boys' and girls' teams in cross country, soccer, and basketball, track and field, along with boys' baseball and girls' volleyball.
