= Cristo Rey High School (Sacramento) =

Location
- 8475 Jackson Rd; Sacramento, California 95826; United States
- 38°31′7″N 121°25′57″W

Information
- Type: Private, coeducational
- Motto: Mercy ∙ Goodness ∙ Service
- Religious affiliations: Roman Catholic; Society of Jesus; Sisters of Mercy
- Established: 2006; 20 years ago
- President: Fr. Christopher Calderón, SJ
- Administrator: Carrie Dickens
- Director: Debbie Woodsford
- Chaplain: Fr. Tom O'Neill, SJ
- Grades: 9-12
- Color: Purple Black
- Mascot: Saints
- Accreditation: Western Association of Schools and Colleges
- Tuition: $2,300
- Affiliation: Cristo Rey Network
- Website: www.crhss.org

Cristo Rey High School Sacramento is a private, Roman Catholic high school in Sacramento, California, situated on the corner of Jackson and Florin-Perkins Roads. It is in the Roman Catholic Diocese of Sacramento.

== History ==
Cristo Rey opened in Sacramento in August, 2006 to serve students from lower-income families, with over 90% qualifying for the federal free or reduced lunch program. It is part of the Cristo Rey Network of high schools, the original being Cristo Rey Jesuit High School in Chicago. The school is co-sponsored by the Society of Jesus (Jesuits), the Sisters of Mercy, and the Sisters of Notre Dame de Namur.

On Thursday, June 3, 2010, Cristo Rey HS had its first graduation class. The ceremony was held at St. Ignatius Loyola Church. The class consisted of 53 students, all of whom were accepted into colleges and universities.

In 2017 the family share of the tuition was $2,300 and the school listed 120 corporate partners in its Work-Study Program.

== Activities ==
All students make a one-day retreat their first three years and an overnight retreat their final year. The required service hours for all students grows each year, from 20 to 25 to 30 to 40 hours.

Student clubs include Student Government, Cyber Patriots, Mathletes, La Raza Unida, Student Ambassadors, SHPE, Pro-Life, Student Art, Drama, Yearbook Club, Garden Club, Peer Mentor Club, Music Ministry Club, Campus Ministry, Yoga Club, and Pacific Islander Club.

Sponsored sports include Cross Country, Track & Field, Basketball (Men's & Women's), Soccer (Men's & Women's), and Volleyball.
