= St. Martin de Porres High School (Cleveland) =

Saint Martin de Porres High School, Cleveland

Location
- 6202 St. Clair Avenue; Cleveland, Ohio 44103, USA
- 41°31′23″N 81°38′54″W

Information
- Type: Private, coeducational
- Established: 2004; 22 years ago
- Oversight: Society of Jesus (Jesuits); Sisters of the Humility of Mary
- President: Chaz Napoli
- Grades: 9–12
- Colors: Royal blue and black
- Team name: Lions
- Affiliation: Cristo Rey Network of Schools
- Website: saintmartincleveland

Saint Martin de Porres High School is a private, lay-run Catholic high school in the St. Clair-Superior neighborhood in Cleveland, Ohio. It is part of the Cristo Rey Network.

== Background ==
Saint Martin de Porres High School was established in 2004 as a part of the Cristo Rey Network of work-study University-preparatory schools. Students are only accepted if their family's income is at or below 200 percent of the federal poverty level, and most are one to two years behind their grade level. The school is primarily composed of African-American students.

At Saint Martin about one third of the tuition is covered by the educational voucher system in Ohio, but the corporate internship share is greater and allows for a superior level of education. In 2017 Saint Martin responded to the demand to educate more students and undertook a $30 million rebuilding project that would raise its capacity to 525 students. The new building facilitated a student-centered, project-based way of learning.

== Campus ministry and service ==
There are liturgical celebrations throughout the year which are a part of the spiritual program for all students. In the first three years all students experience a day-long retreat, and in senior year an overnight retreat. Additionally, Kairos and men's/women's overnight retreats are optional.

All students are taught the Christian spirituality of service and participate in service-learning projects in the outside community. Also, special immersion opportunities are offered, as in Cleveland, West Virginia, New Orleans, and El Salvador. Other voluntary projects include the St. Philip Neri Hot meal Program, the Store Front Drop-in Center, United Cerebral Palsy, and St. Clair Superior Development Corporation. In addition, some school clubs include a service component in their activities.

== Activities ==
- Peer Mediation
- Women's Circle
- Yearbook Club
- Student Senate
- Poetry Club
- Prom Line-Up
- Prom Planning Committee
- Quake (Step Team)
- Robotics & Programming
- Youth in Government (YIG)
- Nature Club/Outdoor Experiences
- Saint Martin Recruiting Force (SMRFs)
- Student Advocates for Social Justice (SASJ)
- Photography Experiences (Project SnapShot)
- Students in Free Enterprise (SIFE) / Investment Club

== Athletics ==
- JV volleyball
- Varsity volleyball
- Varsity soccer (Co-ed)
- Cross country (boys & girls)
- JV & varsity boys basketball
- Varsity girls basketball
- Varsity baseball
- Varsity softball
- Cross Country (Co-Ed)
- Track & field (boys and girls)

== Notable alumni ==
- Enrique Freeman (2019), NBA player
