= Cristo Rey Jesuit High School (Minneapolis) =

Private school in Minnesota, U.S.

Cristo Rey Jesuit High School Twin Cities

Location
- 2924 4th Avenue South; Minneapolis, Minnesota 55408, USA
- 44°56′59″N 93°16′13″W

Information
- Type: Private, coeducational
- Religious affiliations: Roman Catholic; Jesuit
- Established: 2007; 19 years ago
- President: Jason Morrison
- Principal: Zindy Mooney
- Chaplain: Fr. Thomas Bambrick, S.J.
- Grades: 9–12
- Gender: Co-educational
- Enrollment: 388 (2025)
- Hours in school day: 7-12
- Campus: Urban 160,000-square-foot (15,000 m^{2}) Colin Powell Leadership Center
- Colors: Navy Blue and Orange
- Slogan: A School That Works
- Mascot: Cusco the Puma
- Team name: Pumas
- Accreditation: NCA-CASI
- Tuition: $23,400 (~%4 paid by student)
- Graduates: 1,195
- Admissions: Myriam Vigil
- Athletics: Stanley Clay
- Website: Official website
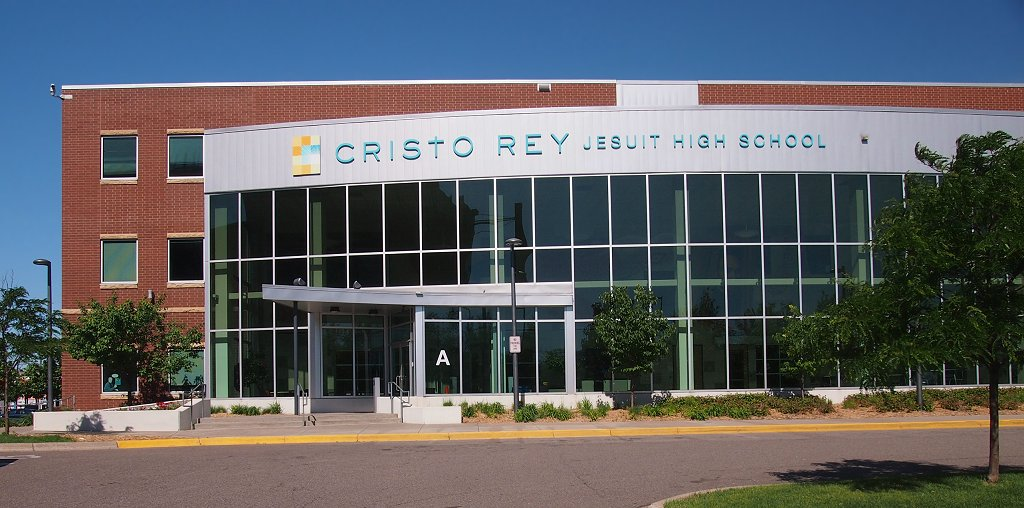

Cristo Rey Jesuit High School Twin Cities is a private Roman Catholic high school located in the Phillips neighborhood of Minneapolis, Minnesota, United States, in the Archdiocese of Saint Paul and Minneapolis. It was founded by the Society of Jesus in 2007 and is one of over forty-one high schools in the country which follow the Cristo Rey work-study model of education for students from low-income families.

== Background ==
Cristo Rey Jesuit High School Twin Cities opened in August 2007 and saw its first students graduate in 2011. It is part of the Cristo Rey Network of high schools, the original being Cristo Rey Jesuit High School in Chicago. In October 2025, the school had 119 corporate partners who were ready to employ students through the Cristo Rey Work Study Program.

=== Religious Education ===
Students make day-long retreats in the first three years and in their senior year they make a 3-day Kairos retreat. Three days each week the entire school participates in the 5-minute daily examen practice, which grew out of Ignatian retreats.

=== Service requirement ===
In order to graduate, students are required to complete at least 60 hours of volunteer service (lowered to 40 hours for students during the COVID-19 pandemic), and one long-term or large-scale project. Service hours and projects can be completed during school hours and outside of school.
