= Cristo Rey Polytechnic Institute =

Location
- Valladolid, Castile and León; Spain
- Coordinates: 41.65993°N 4.74523°W

Information
- Type: Private primary, secondary, and vocational training college
- Religious affiliation: Catholic
- Denomination: Jesuit
- Established: 1939; 87 years ago
- Administrator: Roberto Otero André
- Director: Jose Luis Muñoz Villa
- Teaching staff: 110
- Gender: Co-educational
- Enrollment: 1,600
- Publication: Engranajes (Gears)
- Website: www.cristoreyva.com

Cristo Rey Polytechnic Institute is a private Catholic primary, secondary, and vocational training college, located in Valladolid, in the Castile and León region of Spain. Founded by the Society of Jesus in 1939 in the wake of the Spanish Civil War, the school began as a technical school, and then grew to include infant, primary, secondary, baccalaureate, PCPI, and CF of middle and superior degree.

== History ==
On the occasion of the institute's 75th anniversary in 2015, the Minister of Education of Castile and León praised the contribution that the institute has made to education in the region, which experienced a job-surge after its opening. The institute has ties with over 300 companies. Over 90% of students who did a practicum with Renault were hired by the company. An open house at the school was attended by the Minister of Economy, the General Director of Labor, and the General Director of Vocational Training as well as by employers' organizations of Concerted Teaching and the secretary of The Federation of Education and Management.

== See also ==
- Catholic Church in Spain
- Education in Spain
- List of Jesuit schools
