= Cristo Rey Jesuit High School (Baltimore) =

College preparatory school in Maryland, US

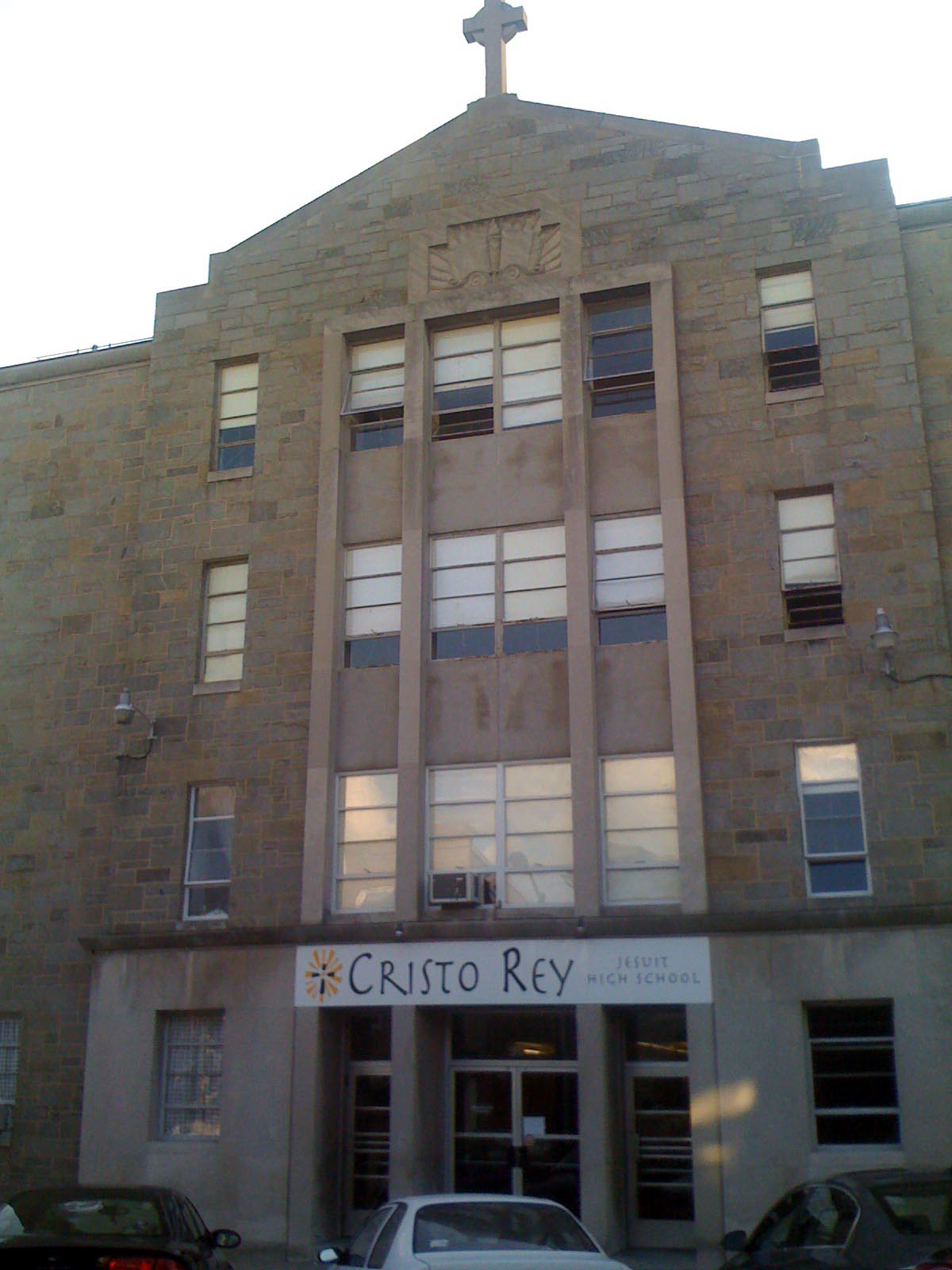

Location
- 420 South Chester Street; Baltimore, Maryland 21231-2729; United States; 39°17′12″N 76°35′13.5″W

Information
- Type: Private, coeducational
- Religious affiliations: Roman Catholic; Society of Jesus
- Established: 2007; 19 years ago
- President: Walter Reap
- Principal: Dr. Gregory Sucre
- Chaplain: Rev. Rick Malloy, S.J.
- Grades: 9–12
- Colors: Black and Gold
- Slogan: Where Learning Gets to Work!
- Mascot: Hornet
- Accreditation: Maryland State Board of Education; Association of Independent Maryland and DC Schools (AIMS); Maryland Province of Jesuits; Cristo Rey Network
- Yearbook: The Buzz
- Affiliation: Cristo Rey Network
- Website: cristoreybalt

Cristo Rey Jesuit High School (CRJ) is an independent, Jesuit, co-educational, college preparatory school in Baltimore, Maryland, Roman Catholic Archdiocese of Baltimore. It is part of the Cristo Rey Network of high schools, the original being Cristo Rey Jesuit High School in Chicago. CRJ opened in August 2007 and graduated its first class in June 2011. In partnership with the East Coast Jesuits and the Baltimore business community, the school targets lower income families of religious, racial, and ethnic diversity.

== History ==
In 1996, the Jesuits in Chicago founded the first Cristo Rey school to provide a college preparatory education to the children in the Pilsen/Little Village neighborhood. Families there wanted a better option for their children, and the Jesuits believed that education was the way out of poverty. The initial stumbling block of how to pay for a college prep education was resolved through having students earn part of their tuition through the Corporate Internship Program. That school was so successful that it became a model for other cities. The Cristo Rey Network was formed and in 2018 supported 36 schools across the country, including Cristo Rey Jesuit here in Fells Point.

Cristo Rey Jesuit is housed in the former Holy Rosary School, which was an elementary school for the mostly Polish neighborhood around its South Chester Street location. CRJ currently enrolls 350 students in grades nine through twelve, representing 25 zip codes and more than 50 middle schools across the city.

Cristo Rey Jesuit is sponsored by the Jesuit East Province Jesuits, which in 1852 founded what have become Loyola University Maryland and Loyola Blakefield. In 1993 they opened St. Ignatius Loyola Academy, a tuition-free middle school for disadvantaged young men from under-served neighborhoods in Baltimore. Now Cristo Rey Baltimore serves mostly low-income families, and tuition is held to $2,500 per year or less.

Cristo Rey Jesuit's first commencement took place on June 18, 2011, at the Roman Catholic Cathedral of Mary Our Queen. Seventy-eight young men and women formed the first graduating class and all were accepted into college, as has continued to be the case.

== Activities ==
Clubs sponsored by the school include the National Honor Society, Gospel Choir, Student Government, Art Club, Yearbook (The Buzz), T.R.E.N.D. (Talent, Respect and Education Never Dies), Many Men, and Anime Club.

All students are required to do at least 10 hours of community service each year. A notable project taken on by students, in conjunction with their social justice course, was research on water pollution and water billing; they studied this precious resource in line with Pope Francis' encyclical on the environment.

Athletic teams sponsored by the school include boys' and girls' soccer and basketball, boys' lacrosse and girls' softball. There is also a performing Step Team.

== See also ==
- List of Jesuit secondary schools in the United States
- National Catholic Educational Association
