= Cristo Rey Philadelphia High School =

Location
- 1717 West Allegheny Avenue; Philadelphia, Pennsylvania 19132; 40°1′59″N 75°8′48″W

Information
- Type: Private, Catholic
- Religious affiliations: Sisters, Servants of the Immaculate Heart of Mary, Oblates of St. Francis de Sales
- Established: 2012
- Founder: John McConnell
- President: Tom Shoemaker
- Principal: Flannery O'Connor
- Grades: 9-12
- Gender: Coeducational
- Colors: Blue and Gold
- Team name: Blue Pride
- Accreditation: Middle States Association
- Newspaper: The Scroll
- Affiliation: Cristo Rey Network
- Website: http://cristoreyphiladelphia.org/

Cristo Rey Philadelphia High School is a private, independent, Catholic high school in Philadelphia, Pennsylvania for students of all faiths. The school has an innovative work-study model where each student works at a company in the Greater Philadelphia Area one day per week. It opened in 2012, becoming the 25th school in the larger Cristo Rey Network.

== History ==
Cristo Rey Philadelphia High School is part of the Cristo Rey Network of high schools. 100% of Cristo Rey graduates have been accepted into four-year college, and 82% of graduates are persisting in college. The school will celebrate its first class of college graduates in the spring of 2020. In 2019, the school moved to a new campus at 1717 W Allegheny Ave. The new building is approximately 100,000 square feet with state-of-the-art facilities, costing nearly $40 million.

== Corporate Work Study Program ==
In the Work-Study Program, each student works one day per week at a local business and earns real wages that go directly to the school, covering the majority of the student's cost of tuition. Cristo Rey Philadelphia has more than 100 job partners in the Greater Philadelphia Area, including PECO, Comcast, Independence Blue Cross, FMC, Deloitte and the Philadelphia Zoo."
