= Cristo Rey OKC =

Coordinates: 35°28′31.04″N 97°34′57.84″W

Location
- 900 North Portland Avenue; Oklahoma City, Oklahoma 73107; United States

Information
- Type: Private, prep
- Denomination: Roman Catholic
- Established: 2018
- Status: Open
- President: Kelsey Herman
- Principal: Kinsey Genheimer
- Grades: 9-12
- Gender: Coeducational
- Enrollment: 0
- Website: www.cristoreyokc.org

Cristo Rey OKC is a Roman Catholic, private high school founded by the Roman Catholic Archdiocese of Oklahoma City in 2018 to provide college preparatory education. In conjunction with local businesses, the students' education is subsidized through the work-study model characteristic of schools in the Cristo Rey Network, of which it is a member. Opened on the fall of 2018, the high school is located on the campus of Oklahoma State University–Oklahoma City.

== History ==
The effort to open Cristo Rey OKC began in the fall of 2015 among members of the Catholic community. With the approval of Archbishop Paul S. Coakley. Local businesses pledged to support the corporate work-study program. With the approval of the Cristo Rey Network, a feasibility study was launched and subsequently the school's opening was set for the fall of 2018 on the campus of Oklahoma State University–Oklahoma City.
