= Holy Family Cristo Rey High School (Birmingham, Alabama) =

Location
- 1832 Center Way South; Birmingham, Alabama 35205; United States

Information
- Type: Private, Coeducational
- Religious affiliations: Roman Catholic; Passionist Fathers
- Established: 2007
- Grades: 9–12
- Colors: Blue, White and Gold
- Team name: Tornadoes
- Accreditation: Southern Association of Colleges and Schools
- Affiliation: Cristo Rey Network; National Catholic Educational Association
- Website: http://www.hfcristorey.org

Holy Family Cristo Rey High School is a private Catholic high school in the Titusville neighborhood of Birmingham, Alabama. It is located in the Diocese of Birmingham in Alabama and is sponsored by the Passionists.

== History ==
Members in the Holy Cross Province of the Congregation of the Passion founded Holy Family High School in 1943, connected to an older lower school.

In 2007, with changing demographics in the Ensley area, the need was perceived for a school that would assist those in poverty. After contact with the Cristo Rey Network, the first Cristo Rey school in the South was opened.

Following the Cristo Rey model, the school combines academic study and a corporate work-study program for students from economically challenged families to enable them to graduate from high school prepare for college. Every student works five full days per month to fund the majority of his or her education. Students work at law firms, banks, hospitals, universities, and other professional Corporate Partners, over 70 in all.

As of 2018, 100% of HFCR graduates had been accepted into college. In 2019, Holy Family moved from its original location in Ensley to the Titusville neighborhood, acquiring the former Center Street Middle School from the Birmingham City Schools.

== Activities ==
A select group of Student Ambassadors from the upper three years represents the school to the public and to prospective students, volunteering many hours of their time to attract, assess, and mentor prospective students.

Nine sports are sponsored by the school: volleyball, basketball, track, baseball, soccer, softball, lacrosse, cheerleading and dance. Among the school's more successful extracurriculars is an investment club which teaches students how to save and invest for the future.

== Notable graduates ==
- Michael Choy - Attorney
- Annie Easley - NASA computer scientist
- Demetrius Newton Jr - Communications Instructor at Miles College.
