= Franciscan High School (Baton Rouge, Louisiana) =

Location
- Baton Rouge, Louisiana
- 30°29′50″N 91°8′58″W

Information
- Former name: Cristo Rey Franciscan High School
- Type: Franciscan, Catholic
- Denomination: Roman Catholic
- Established: 2016
- Status: Closed
- Closed: 2 June 2023
- Teaching staff: 13,8 (on an FTE basis)
- Grades: 9–12
- Gender: Coeducational
- Enrollment: 174 (2019–20)
- Student to teacher ratio: 12.6
- Mascot: Wolves
- Website: http://www.franciscanhigh.org

Franciscan High School, Baton Rouge, Louisiana, opened in August 2016, as Cristo Rey Franciscan High School and part of the Cristo Rey Network. In July 2022, the school became known as Franciscan High School, operating with the sponsorship of the Franciscan Missionaries of Our Lady and within the Diocese of Baton Rouge. The school closed on June 2, 2023.

== History ==
The school was founded by the Franciscan Missionaries of Our Lady and began classes on August 8, 2016 in the former Redemptorist High School buildings in North Baton Rouge. On August 12–13, 2016, the school buildings were lost in the Great Flood of Baton Rouge. The school relocated to Bon Carre Technology Park for the remainder of the 2016-2017 school year and the start of the 2017-2018 school year. In February 2018, the school returned to its original campus on St. Gerard Avenue in modular buildings.

The school added a grade level each year until its first graduating class, the Class of 2020, received their diplomas from Cristo Rey Baton Rouge on May 23, 2020. The inaugural graduating class included 41 seniors.

In July 2022, the school cut its ties with Cristo Rey, operating with the sponsorship of the Franciscan Missionaries of Our Lady and within the Diocese of Baton Rouge, and was renamed Franciscan High School. The school closed on June 2, 2023.

== Corporate Work Study Program ==
Franciscan High School utilized a unique Corporate Work Study program model whereby all students of the school were employed by a corporate work partner. Students worked one day per week at their corporate work study placement to help earn a portion of their tuition. As of 2022, the program had over 40 local partners.

== Athletics ==
Cristo Rey Baton Rouge Franciscan High athletics competed in the LHSAA.
