= Cristo Rey Dallas College Prep =

Coordinates: 32°43′49.26″N 96°39′20.73″W

Location
- 9701 San Leon Avenue; Dallas, Texas 75217; United States

Information
- Type: Catholic, college prep
- Established: 2015; 11 years ago
- President: Kelby Woodard
- Principal: Dr. Nivea Lisandra Torres, Principal and Chief Academic Officer
- Grades: 9–12
- Gender: Coeducational
- Enrollment: 478
- Affiliation: Cristo Rey Network
- Website: cristoreydallas

Cristo Rey Dallas College Prep is a coeducational, Catholic, college preparatory school and a member of the Cristo Rey Network that follows the work-study model of education. The first criterion for admission is financial need, and the school is designed for students who cannot otherwise afford a college prep education.

== History ==
The school is located in the Pleasant Grove area of Southeast Dallas at 1064 N. St. Augustine, the former site of St. Augustine Catholic School.
