= Cristo Rey San Diego High School =

Catholic high school

- Formation: 2020
- Type: Catholic high school
- Headquarters: 1228 S 38th St., San Diego, CA, 92113
- Coordinates: 32.6933°N 117.1127°W
- President: Christian Kampfl
- Website: cristoreysandiego.org

Cristo Rey San Diego High School is a Catholic college-preparatory school and work study program in San Diego, California, sponsored by the Congregation of Jesus and Mary. Opened in 2020, it is a part of the national Cristo Rey Network of 39 high schools. To be admitted, students must meet financial need guidelines.

== Description ==
Cristo Rey San Diego occupies the former premises of St. Jude's Academy. The first graduating class will graduate in May of 2024. The school enrollment is 168 as of the 2023-2024 school year, offering grades 9-12.

Cristo Rey San Diego is accredited by the Accrediting Commission for Schools, Western Association of Schools and Colleges.

In 2022, the University of San Diego announced a special admission track opportunity for Cristo Rey San Diego High School "graduating seniors at one of the 10 participating high schools who have a 3.7 GPA or higher, have taken at least three honors-level courses and have no disciplinary or academic violations". Qualifying students may "attend the University of San Diego (USD), with 100 percent of their family’s demonstrated financial need met".

The first graduating class of 37 students will celebrate commencement on May 31, 2024. As of the beginning of April 2024, "95% of the graduating seniors had been accepted to four-year colleges and universities."

== Corporate Work Study Program ==
As part of the Cristo Rey Network, Cristo Rey San Diego offers a corporate work study program where students work five days each month at a corporation in San Diego. 41 corporate sponsors employ students.

San Diego Business Journal described the curricular approach of the school: "The school uses a unique corporate work study program as a model of education that gives students not only a college-preparatory education, but at the same time they earn work experience in a corporate setting... working at one of the school's corporate partners to help pay for their tuition while obtaining practical real world experience."
