= Cristo Rey College, Tacna =

Private Catholic primary and secondary school

Location
- Cristo Rey Avenue, Augusto B. Leguia; Tacna; Peru; 18°1′53″S 70°16′12″W

Information
- Type: Private primary and secondary school
- Motto: Be men and women for others
- Religious affiliation: Catholicism
- Denomination: Jesuits
- Established: 1962; 64 years ago
- Director: Nelfi Vargas
- Grades: K-12
- Gender: Co-educational
- Website: www.ccr.edu.pe/web/nosotros.php

Cristo Rey College, Tacna, is a private Catholic primary and secondary school, located in the city of Tacna in the south of Peru. The school was founded by the Society of Jesus in 1962.

== History ==
In 1959, from the Chicago Jesuit province, Ernest V. Mclear, S.J., professor of theology at Saint Mary Seminary of Theology, arrived in Peru to prepare for the arrival of United States Jesuits there. On 17 November 1959, McClear and Fred J. Green arrived. In 1962 these two Jesuits founded Colegio Cristo Rey with two classrooms in the parish of San Pedro. In 2965 it moved to a new location in the area of Para, on land donated by the Gubbins Forero family. In 1969 Green was the director of the high school and Catalina Concannon, of the primary school. Total enrollment was 356 students.

== See also ==
- Colegio de la Inmaculada (Lima)
- List of Jesuit sites

== Bibliography ==
- Fortunato, Zora Carbajal (1987). Tacna, history and folklore (3rd ed.). Cooperativa San Pedro.
