= Cristo Rey Boston High School =

Private Catholic school in Dorchester, Massachusetts, United States

Location
- 100 Savin Hill Avenue; Dorchester, Massachusetts 02125; United States; 42°18′44″N 71°3′15″W

Information
- Former name: St. John's High School; North Cambridge Catholic High School
- Type: Private, Coeducational, Catholic
- Motto: College its not the dream. Its the plan
- Religious affiliation: Catholic
- Established: 1921
- President: Rosemary J. Powers
- Principal: Thomas Ryan
- Faculty: 60
- Grades: 9–12
- Colors: Blue and Gold
- Athletics conference: MIAA – Catholic Central League
- Nickname: Knights
- Accreditation: NEASC
- Affiliation: Roman Catholic; Cristo Rey Network
- Work Study: Operations Manager, Marcin Kunicki, Adebisi Lipede
- Website: Official site

Cristo Rey Boston High School is a private, Roman Catholic high school in Boston. It offers full-tuition scholarships to all accepted students]. The school was founded in 1921 as St. John's High School, and opened in 1951 as an independent school, North Cambridge Catholic High School. The school moved from Cambridge to Dorchester in 2010. It has 376 students in grades 9-12.

== History ==
=== The Cristo Rey Network and relocation ===
In 2004, North Cambridge Catholic High School joined the Cristo Rey Network, a national network of Catholic high schools exclusively serving families of limited economic means. The school replicated the Cristo Rey Corporate Work Study Program which allows each student to offset the majority of the cost of their education by working entry-level jobs five days per month throughout Greater Boston. Companies pay $33,800 for a team of four students, the equivalent of one full-time employee, which allows the school to offset the cost of educating students.

In 2010, the school moved to Dorchester in order to better serve the population of students primarily commuting from Boston's most under-resourced zip codes. Upon moving, the school was renamed Cristo Rey Boston High School. Cristo Rey Boston acquired the former St. William’s Elementary School, which had been closed in 2009 and unused in the interim. In its first year in Boston, the school completed nearly $2 million in renovations to upgrade the facilities to a modern high school. The school’s capacity also increased with the relocation and is now able to educate roughly 400 students.

The former North Cambridge Catholic building was sold on September 17, 2010 for $3.6 million to Somerville resident Dr. Mouhab Z. Rizkallah, an orthodontist. The building underwent Cambridge Historical Landmark status in December 2010. It is located in a Residence B Zone, and is being converted into residential apartments.

== Athletics ==
Cristo Rey High School's athletic teams, the Cristo Rey Knights, participate in the following athletics:

- Fall Sports
  - Boys' Varsity Soccer Team
  - Girls' Varsity Soccer Team
  - Girls Volleyball
- Winter Sports
  - Boys' Varsity Basketball
    - 2013-14 playoff appearance
    - D4 State Championship 2007-2008, as North Cambridge Catholic HS
  - Girls' Varsity Basketball
  - Cheerleading Team (Started on 2017-2018 academic year)
- Spring Sports
  - Baseball
  - Softball

== School facts ==
- Since 2010, 99% of graduates have been accepted to four-year colleges, and all graduates have been accepted to college since converting to the Cristo Rey model.
- 85% of students qualify for the federal free or reduced lunch program.
- The average family income is $28,451.
- The school is 90% Boston residents.
- The percentage of our students' families living under the poverty line is 48%.
- Cristo Rey Boston students had been employed by 143 Corporate Partners the 2013-2014 academic year.

== Notable alumnus ==
- Tip O'Neill — St. John the Evangelist High School (1931); Speaker of the United States House of Representatives
