= Notre Dame Cristo Rey High School =

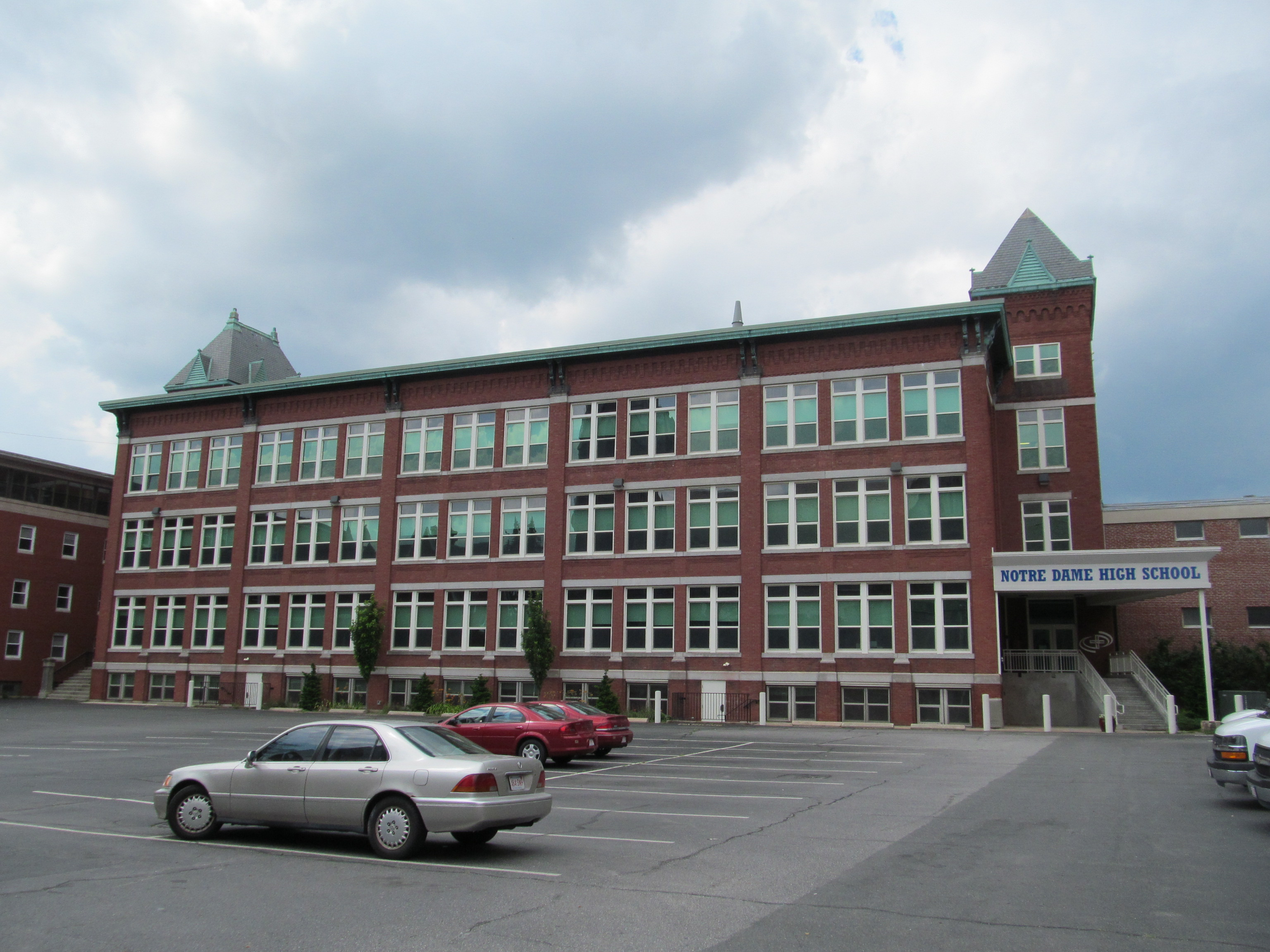

Location
- 207 Lawrence Street; Methuen, Massachusetts 01844; United States; 42°42′37″N 71°10′3″W

Information
- Type: Private, Roman Catholic
- Established: 2004
- NCES School ID: A0501923
- President: Maryalyce Gilfeather
- Principal: Anthony Zavagnin
- Teaching staff: 20.0 (on an FTE basis)
- Grades: 9–12
- Gender: Coeducational
- Enrollment: 276 (2019–2020)
- Student to teacher ratio: 13.8
- Campus: Urban
- Colors: Black, white and blue
- Nickname: Panthers
- Accreditation: New England Association of Schools and Colleges
- Publication: Quasimodo
- Tuition: $14,500 (2021–2022)
- Affiliation: Sisters of Notre Dame de Namur; Cristo Rey Network
- Website: www.ndcrhs.org

Notre Dame Cristo Rey High School is a Roman Catholic high school in Methuen, Massachusetts, United States, in the Roman Catholic Archdiocese of Boston. Founded in 2004 by the Sisters of Notre Dame de Namur, it follows the Cristo Rey Network work-study model.

A $5-million renovation was completed in 2009. In 2011, the school received accreditation from the New England Association of Schools and Colleges. Approximately ninety percent of the student enrollment is Hispanic.

Notre Dame High School is a member of the Massachusetts Interscholastic Athletic Association, competing in boys' cross country, basketball, and baseball; girls' cross country, basketball, and softball, volleyball, and cheerleading.

== Notable alumni ==
- L. J. Figueroa (born 1998), Dominican-American basketball player in the Israeli Basketball Premier League
