= Cristo Rey Tampa High School =

Cristo Rey Tampa Salesian High School

Location
- 6400 E. Chelsea St. Tampa, Florida 33610; United States
- 27°59′18″N 82°23′03″W

Information
- Type: Salesian, Catholic
- Established: 2016; 10 years ago
- President: Dr. Patrick Liang
- Principal: Kelly Larson
- Staff: 50
- Teaching staff: 20
- Grades: 9-12
- Gender: Coeducational
- Enrollment: 227
- Colors: Royal blue, gold, navy
- Mascot: Panthers
- Nickname: CR Tampa
- Accreditation: Florida Council of Independent Schools
- Affiliation: Cristo Rey Network
- Website: CristoReyTampa.org

Cristo Rey Tampa Salesian High School is a Catholic college-preparatory school and work study program sponsored by the Salesians of Don Bosco. Opened in 2016, it is a part of the national Cristo Rey Network of schools whose goal is to educate students from lower income families and provide the opportunity to attend college.

To be admitted, students must meet financial need guidelines and rigorous academic standards. The school offers a program where students can gain real-world work experience across many different professional fields, and develop workplace readiness skills as well as confidence and aspiration for college and career success.
