= Cristo Rey St. Martin College Prep =

Location
- 3106 BelvidereRoad; Waukegan, Illinois 60085; United States
- 42°21′7″N 87°49′58″W

Information
- Type: Private, Roman Catholic, coed
- Established: 2004; 22 years ago
- President: Preston Kendall
- Principal: Michael Odiotti
- Grades: 9-12
- Enrollment: 427
- Campus: Small suburban
- Colors: Blue and Gold
- Tuition: CRSM is a needs-based scholarship program school with a required work-study program for all students. The net cost to attend CRSM varies according to each family’s income.
- Affiliation: Cristo Rey Network
- Work Study: Director, Brian Weinberg
- Admissions: Director, Noemi Cuesta
- Website: cristoreystmartin.org

Cristo Rey St. Martin College Prep, formerly St. Martin de Porres High School, is a co-ed, college preparatory private high school in Waukegan, Illinois, established in 2004. Cristo Rey St. Martin is a member of the Cristo Rey Network of high schools and is affiliated with the Roman Catholic Archdiocese of Chicago. The academic curriculum is combined with a Corporate Work Study Program, where students are required to work as interns at various Chicago land area businesses to gain real-world work experience and contribute to their educational tuition.

== History ==
Cristo Rey St. Martin College Prep (CRSM) was originally called St. Martin de Porres High School (SMdP) and was established officially in 2004. In 2001, Auxiliary Bishop Gerald Kicanas and Rev. George J. Rassas suggested opening St. Martin de Porres in the Waukegan/North Chicago area to enroll grades 9-12 students of limited economic means. St. Martin de Porres was the first Catholic high school to be established in Lake County since Carmel High School in Mundelein, which opened in 1963.

St. Martin de Porres initially enrolled 95 students and was based in an office building in downtown Waukegan. In 2006, SMdP leased the old St. Joseph parish and school property and relocated to Martin Luther King Jr. Ave. The following year, 2007, the first class graduated from SMdP with 13 students.

In 2008, Dr. Mike Odiotti was hired as the Principal, and student enrollment reached 221. Several years later, in 2011, Preston Kendall became the president, and shortly after, St. Martin de Porres High School became affiliated with the Cristo Rey Network, and the name changed to Cristo Rey St. Martin College Prep.

In 2018, CRSM moved into a former Kmart store that was extensively remodeled to become a school campus. The new building has won multiple awards for creatively reusing an existing space. The second remodeling phase ended in 2021, and the school then had a gym, fitness center, coffee shop, and more classrooms, and an enrollment of 408 students.

== Background ==
The Cristo Rey Network comprises 39 high schools that provide a Catholic, college preparatory education to urban young people who live in communities with limited educational options. And 80% of the students at CRSM qualify for the Federal Free and Reduced Lunch Program. Students cover the bulk of their tuition by working at entry-level jobs in the corporate world. Around 86 businesses employ students from St. Martin's. Videos are available covering the St. Martin experience.

Cristo Rey St. Martin is open to students of all faiths and cultures. There are five school-wide liturgies, prayer services on Martin Luther King Day and Ash Wednesday, and a spiritual retreat program for all the students. Sixty-five percent of the students choose to participate in voluntary service projects.

== Academics ==
Twenty-eight two-semester credits are required for graduation. This includes 4 credits in English and math, science, and social studies, 2 in world languages, and 1 in physical education/health. A credit in theology and in work study must also be earned for each year in attendance. Also 4 credits must be chosen from the choice of 9 advanced placement courses and about 11 other electives. Further, eligible students can earn college credit directly through College of Lake County. And Jesuit Virtual Learning Academy (JVLA) courses are available online for courses not offered at St. Martin.
