= Cristo Rey San José Jesuit High School =

Location
- 1390 Five Wounds Lane; San Jose, California; United States
- 37°21′03″N 121°51′47″W

Information
- Type: Private high school
- Religious affiliation: Catholicism
- Denomination: Jesuit
- Established: 2014; 12 years ago
- President: Silvia Scandar Mahan
- Dean: Chris Jarrett
- Principal: Andria Bengtson
- Grades: 9-12
- Gender: Co-educational
- Enrollment: 482 (2020)
- Colors: Yellow, Black
- Mascot: Lion
- Nickname: Cristo Rey Lions
- Affiliation: Cristo Rey Network
- Website: www.cristoreysanjose.org

Cristo Rey San José Jesuit High School is a private Catholic high school, located in San Jose, California, in the United States. Founded by the California Province of the Society of Jesus in 2014, the school is a member of the Cristo Rey Network of work-study schools for students from low-income families.

== See also ==
- Catholic Church in the United States
- Education in California
- List of Jesuit schools
