= Cristo Rey Network =

Education organization in Chicago, Illinois, US

- Established: 2000; 26 years ago
- Tax ID no.: 04-3730980
- Headquarters: 11 E Adams St Ste 800; Chicago, Illinois
- Chairperson: Jane Genster
- President: Kelby Woodard
- Affiliations: Catholic, Jesuit
- Revenue: $3,025,815 (2016)
- Website: CristoReyNetwork
- Remarks: Foundations have contributed over $25 million to the Network, especially the Cassin Educational Initiative Foundation and the Bill & Melinda Gates Foundation along with the Walton Family Foundation and W. Sheehan.

The Cristo Rey Network is a not-for-profit organization founded in 2000 to increase the number of schools modeled after Cristo Rey Jesuit High School in Chicago, which was founded in 1996 to prepare youth from low-income families for post-secondary educational opportunities.

Schools within the Network integrate four years of college preparatory academics with continuous professional work experience that pays most of the cost of a student's education. The Network is compiled of 38 high schools delivering a career focused, college preparatory education in the Catholic tradition for students with limited economic resources, uniquely integrating rigorous academic curricula with four years of professional work experience and support to and through college.

Cristo Rey partners with educators, businesses and communities to enable students to fulfill their aspirations for a lifetime of success: students are three times more likely to complete a bachelor's degree by age 24, compared to the total U.S. low-income population.

== History ==
In 1996, Cristo Rey Jesuit High School in Chicago was opened by the Society of Jesus to help "students from underserved, low-income communities" prepare for college. To subsidize this effort, the school partnered with businesses, using a work-study approach, which over time became the hallmark of the Cristo Rey model. It proved helpful in preparing students for college and for entry into the business world.

In 2004, a segment on CBS 60 Minutes drew attention to the model. Some Catholic educators nationwide and some prominent philanthropists who were committed to educational reform also joined the Network.

Cristo Rey graduates began enrolling in college at rates consistent with the enrollment levels of high-income students, and completing college at a rate considerably higher than high school graduates from low-income families nationwide. The peer-reviewed Catholic Education, A Journal of Inquiry and Practice documented the replication of the model nationally and the standardization of the norms for membership. By 2015, 7,000 graduates of Cristo Rey had either earned their undergraduate degree or were currently enrolled in college. A Lexington Institute study in 2014 described Cristo Rey schools as "one of the nation’s most powerful urban education success stories."

== Corporate work study program ==
The Corporate Work Study Program was created in 1995 by Richard R. Murray, when he was approached by the founders of Cristo Rey to help find a way to finance their new school. Each Cristo Rey school partners with a Corporate Work Study Program. The Corporate Work Study Program (a separately incorporated entity) operates like a temporary employment agency within Cristo Rey schools and employs every student five days a month in an entry-level, professional job all four years of high school. Students earn much of their education cost through participation in the work study program. Typically a student, from the age of 14, will be earning about $18/hour in tuition support. The program has been praised for allowing students to gain real-world work experience across many different fields, including law, finance, healthcare, technology, marketing, university, and many other professional offices. The Corporate Work Study Program has been shown to have a significant formative impact on students – demystifying the world outside their neighborhoods, developing workplace readiness skills, introducing them to role models and supportive mentors, and building competence, confidence, and aspiration for college and career success.

== University partners ==
In 2009 the Network began its University Partners program which includes 45 university partners across the country. University Partners recruit, mentor, and support the Cristo Rey graduates, along guidelines supplied by the Network.

== Religious sponsors and endorsers ==
Thirty-eight religious sponsors and endorsers are primarily responsible for the religious charism and Catholicity of the schools. While the first Cristo Rey school was started by the Society of Jesus and today the Jesuits sponsor and endorse 13 schools, the Cristo Rey Network partners with 38 dioceses, orders, and congregations. The curriculum of each school includes religious studies and a student ministry program through which they explore religion, faith, and spirituality. Youth of all faiths and no faiths are welcome, and 46% of the students in the Network are not Catholic.

== Growth ==
The process of opening a new school begins after receiving approval from the local Bishop. Every Cristo Rey Network school must complete a 12-18 month feasibility study, an assessment of need and interest, to determine if a school could succeed in that community.

== Recognition ==
In 2008, Fr. John P. Foley, S.J., received the Presidential Citizen's Medal for his leadership in introducing this new model to Catholic education. The same year Loyola Press released More than A Dream: How One School's Vision is Changing the World. The book documents the success of Cristo Rey Jesuit High School in Chicago, along with the development of the Cristo Rey model and of the Cristo Rey Network of schools. The network received the 2012 Classy Award for Educational Advancement.

In 2004 "the Bill & Melinda Gates Foundation and the Cassin Educational Initiative Foundation had announced plans "to grant $18.9 million to create 12 new small college-preparatory high schools across the country... modeled after the highly successful Cristo Rey Jesuit High School of Chicago," and by 2008 the Gates Foundation had contributed $15.9 million for the spread of the model. In 2017 the Network was chosen as the primary beneficiary of the NFL's Corporate Cup Celebrity Challenge.

== List of Cristo Rey schools ==
These are the current 40 Cristo Rey Network high schools, in the order of the year they joined the Network:

- Cristo Rey Jesuit High School,† Chicago, IL (1996)
- De La Salle North Catholic High School,† Portland, OR (2001)
- Verbum Dei High School*, Los Angeles, CA (2002)
- Arrupe Jesuit High School, Denver, CO (2003)
- Cristo Rey Boston High School*, Boston, MA (2004)
- St. Martin de Porres High School (Cleveland), Cleveland, OH (2004)
- Cristo Rey St. Martin College Prep, Waukegan, IL (2004)
- Notre Dame Cristo Rey High School, Lawrence, MA (2004)
- Cristo Rey New York High School, New York City, NY (2004)
- San Miguel High School, Tucson, AZ (2004)
- Cristo Rey Kansas City High School, Kansas City, MO (2006)
- Cristo Rey High School, Sacramento, CA (2006)
- Cristo Rey Jesuit High School, Baltimore, MD (2007)
- Holy Family Cristo Rey High School*, Birmingham, AL (2007)
- Providence Cristo Rey High School, Indianapolis, IN (2007)
- Cristo Rey Jesuit High School, Minneapolis, MN (2007)
- Christ the King Preparatory School, Newark, NJ (2007)
- Don Bosco Cristo Rey High School, Takoma Park, MD (serves Washington, DC metro area) (2007)
- Cristo Rey Brooklyn High School, Brooklyn, NY (2008)
- Detroit Cristo Rey High School, Detroit, MI (2008)
- Christ the King Jesuit College Prep High School, Chicago (West Side), IL (2008)
- Cristo Rey Jesuit College Preparatory of Houston, Houston, TX (2009)
- Immaculate Conception Academy* (All-Girls), San Francisco, CA (2009)
- DePaul Cristo Rey High School, Cincinnati, OH (2011)
- Cristo Rey Philadelphia High School, Philadelphia, PA (2012)
- Cristo Rey Columbus High School, Columbus, OH (2013)
- Cristo Rey San José Jesuit High School, San Jose, CA (2014)
- Cristo Rey Atlanta Jesuit High School. Atlanta, GA (2014)
- Cristo Rey Jesuit High School Milwaukee, Milwaukee, WI (2015)
- Cristo Rey Dallas College Prep, Dallas, TX (2015)
- Cristo Rey Tampa High School, Tampa, FL (2016)
- Cristo Rey Baton Rouge Franciscan High School, Baton Rouge, LA (2016)
- Cristo Rey OKC, Oklahoma City, OK (2018)
- Cristo Rey Fort Worth High School, Fort Worth, TX (2018)
- Cristo Rey De La Salle East Bay High School, Oakland, CA (2018)
- Cristo Rey Richmond High School, Richmond, VA (2019)
- Cristo Rey St. Viator, Las Vegas, NV (2019)
- Cristo Rey Research Triangle High School, Durham, NC (2019)
- Cristo Rey San Diego High School, San Diego, CA (2020)
- Cristo Rey Orange County High School, Santa Ana, CA (2023)
- Cristo Rey Jesuit Seattle High School, Seattle, WA (2024)
- Cristo Rey Orlando High School, Orlando, FL (2025)

*Existing school converted to Cristo Rey Network program.
†Founding Member of Cristo Rey Network

=== Future schools ===
Other schools in development and the intended opening years are:

- Charleston, SC (2027)

== See also ==
- Cooperative education
- Federal Work-Study Program
