= Cristo Rey Brooklyn High School =

Catholic independent school in New York

Cristo Rey Brooklyn High School.

Location
- 710 East 37th Street; East Flatbush, Brooklyn, New York 11203; United States
- 40°38′22″N 73°56′30″W

Information
- Type: Catholic, Mercy Sisters, Independent
- Established: 2008
- Chairperson: Paul Scariano
- Director: Michael Motyl
- Principal: Clyde Cole
- Grades: 9-12
- Gender: Coeducational
- Average class size: 20
- Mascot: Panther
- Tuition: Based on family income
- Affiliation: Cristo Rey Network
- Website: www.cristoreybrooklyn.org

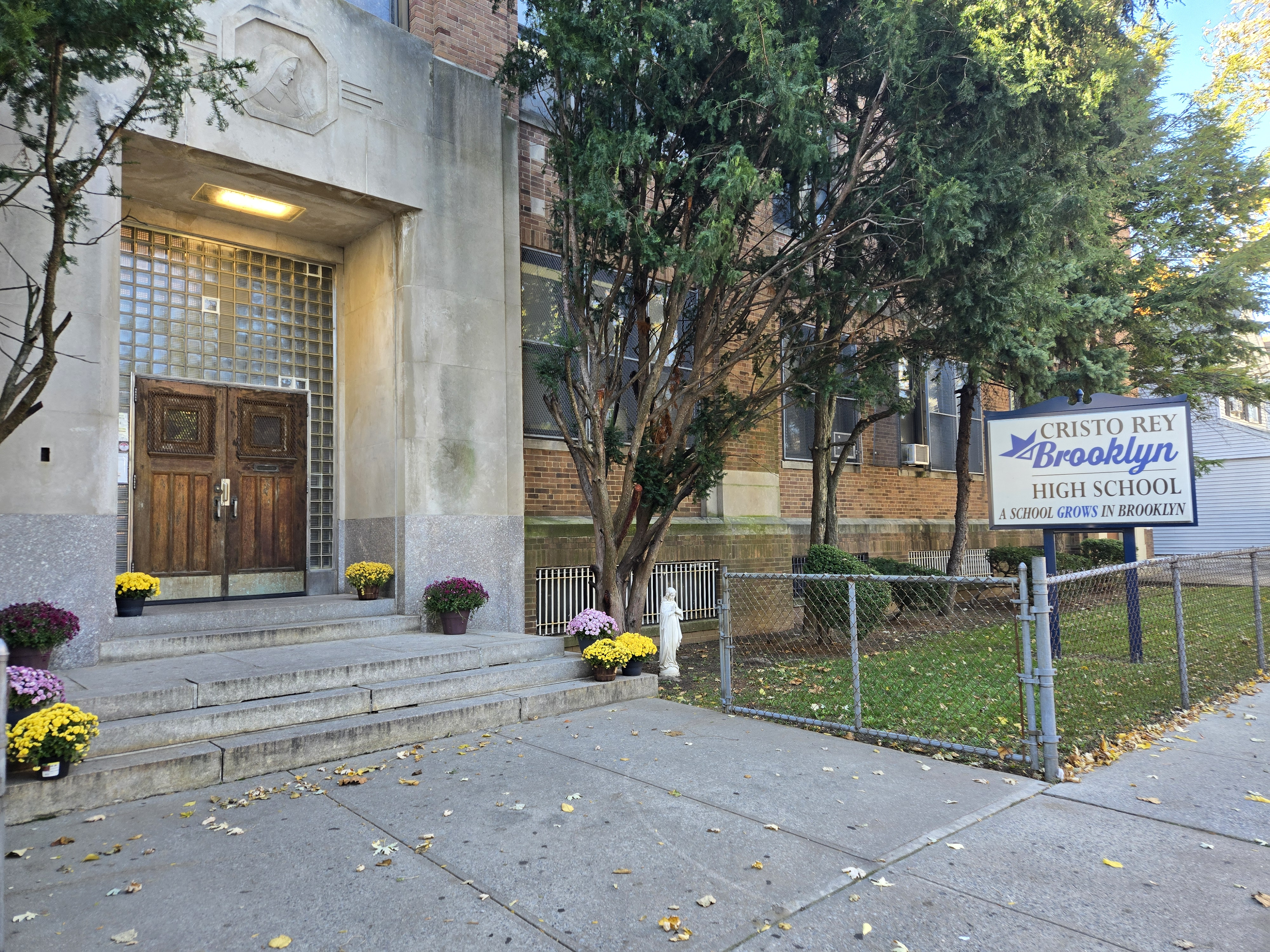
The Cristo Rey Brooklyn High School entrance on 37th Street.

Cristo Rey Brooklyn High School is a private, Roman Catholic high school in Brooklyn, New York. The school opened in August 2008 with an initial freshman class of 43 students, and operates within the Roman Catholic Diocese of Brooklyn. In 2013 it moved to more spacious quarters in the East Flatbush neighborhood of Brooklyn.

== History ==
The school opened on the site of the former Our Lady of Lourdes Elementary School, which closed in June 2005. Lourdes Academy opened in August 2008 and graduated its first class in 2012. In July 2011, Lourdes Academy was renamed Cristo Rey Brooklyn High School. It is part of the Cristo Rey Network of high schools. Its goal is to give children from working class families a better chance for a college education, and assistance is available if they cannot pay the $2500 annual tuition.

In 2013 Cristo Rey Brooklyn moved to the premises of the former Catherine McAuley High School in East Flatbush, Brooklyn.

== Activities ==
Sports sponsored by the school:

FALL

- Cross Country
- Girls Varsity Soccer
- Boy Varsity Soccer
- Girls Volleyball

WINTER

- Girls Varsity Basketball
- Boys Varsity Basketball
- Boys JV Basketball
- Indoor Track
- Ski Club

SPRING

- Varsity Baseball
- Varsity Softball
- Outdoor Track
- Club Boxing

Activities sponsored by the school include:

- African Dance
- Art
- Caribbean Dance
- Cheerleading
- Classic Film Club
- Contemporary Dance
- Film Making
- Girls Who Code
- Student Ambassadors
- Student Government
- Step Team
- Yearbook

In 2016, twelve students participated in the third annual service trip, this year to Nicaragua. raising funds for the trip through various fundraisers and through the organization Courts for Kids.
