= Cristo Rey Atlanta Jesuit High School =

Location
- 222 Piedmont Ave NE; Atlanta, Fulton County, Georgia 30308; United States
- 33°46′23.44″N 84°23′15.72″W

Information
- Type: Jesuit; College prep
- Denomination: Catholic
- Established: 2014; 12 years ago
- President: Camille Naughton
- Principal: Evan Phillips
- Staff: 34
- Teaching staff: 31.0 (on an FTE basis)
- Grades: 9–12
- Gender: Co-educational
- Enrollment: 532 (2019–20)
- Student to teacher ratio: 17.2
- Mascot: Flames
- Accreditation: Southern Association of Independent Schools
- Tuition: $500 to $2500 per year
- Affiliation: Cristo Rey Network and Jesuit Schools Network
- Website: cristoreyatlanta.org

Cristo Rey Atlanta Jesuit High School is a college preparatory school located in Atlanta, Georgia, United States. Opened in 2014, it is in the Cristo Rey Network of schools, with work-study integrated into its program. It serves only low-income students and financial need is a first criterion for admission.

== History ==
Cristo Rey Atlanta opened in 2014 under the auspices of the Society of Jesus (Jesuits) in midtown Atlanta, in a three-story building that was formerly the chancery building for the Archdiocese of Atlanta.

As the demand for its services expanded, the school accepted the donation of a much larger, seven-story building in downtown Atlanta. The new building was officially dedicated on January 30, 2018 with Mayor Keisha Lance Bottoms and Governor Nathan Deal attending the ceremony.

== Corporate Work Study Program ==
The Corporate Work Study Program is the central focus of the school, paying for most of the student's tuition and giving valuable work experience. Students go to their job partner, with one student from each grade level going once a week on their designated work day, Monday to Thursday. Job partners include Coca-Cola, Emory University, and Delta Air Lines.

== Extracurricular activities ==
=== Athletics ===
The school offers the following sports programs:

Boys

- Basketball
- Baseball
- Cheer
- Cross country
- Golf
- Soccer
- Taekwondo

Girls:

- Basketball
- Cheer
- Cross country
- Golf
- Soccer
- Taekwondo
- Volleyball
