= Arrupe Jesuit High School =

Catholic high school in Colorado, US

Location
- 4343 Utica Street; Denver, Colorado 80212; United States; 39°46′32″N 105°2′44″W

Information
- School type: Private, Catholic, coeducational college-preparatory High school
- Motto: Men and Women for Others
- Religious affiliation: Catholic Church (Jesuit)
- Established: 2003 (23 years ago)
- CEEB code: 060468
- President: Michael O'Hagan
- Chairperson: Susan Murphy
- Principal: Fr. John Nugent, SJ
- Grades: 9–12
- Enrollment: 441 (2012-13)
- Campus type: Urban
- Colors: Gray and navy blue
- Athletics: 3A
- Athletics conference: Frontier League
- Mascot: The General
- Team name: The Generals
- Accreditation: Cognia
- Affiliation: Cristo Rey Network
- Magazine: Atticus (literary)
- Website: arrupejesuit.com

Arrupe Jesuit High School is a private Catholic coeducational high school run by the USA Central and Southern Province of the Society of Jesus in Denver, Colorado, United States. Founded in 2003, it is part of the Cristo Rey Network and places students in business internships to help defray the cost of tuition. The school is run independently in the Archdiocese of Denver.

== History ==
Arrupe Jesuit High School was founded by the Missouri Province (renamed USA Central and Southern Province) of the Jesuits and business leaders in Denver as a school using the Cristo Rey model to serve economically disadvantaged students. The school was named after the former superior general of the Jesuit order, Father Pedro Arrupe.

In early 2003, the school purchased the Holy Family Catholic School campus in northwest Denver to house the new program.

The school opened in August 2003 with a class of ninth graders and added another grade each year until the 2006–2007 school year, which saw the school's first graduating class of 47 students. In 2017 it had a 10-year record of graduating all its students and having all of them accepted into college.

Only 36% of Hispanics and 55% of African-Americans graduate from high school in Denver. To expand its enrollment, Arrupe Jesuit High completed an $11-million building program in 2015, which added seven classrooms with advanced technology, student fitness and activities rooms, a new cafeteria, and additional office space. A new chapel was built in the former building, along with three new classrooms and office and work space.

Arrupe was chosen as a successful school by the Bill & Melinda Gates Foundation. The Gates Foundation has also given $18.9 million in support of Cristo Rey schools across the country. Each year some graduates of Jesuit schools who have finished college volunteer to assist at Arrupe, through the Alum Service Corps program.

== Curriculum ==
Arrupe requires students to earn about two-thirds of the annual cost of their education through a corporate work-study program where students job-share entry-level positions, working five days a month from mid-August to early June. Students have 6 academic classes per day, and if they fail to do their homework they have mandatory study hall (7th Period).

== Extracurricular activities ==
Athletic teams at Arrupe compete at the 3A level in Colorado High School Activities Association-sanctioned competition. Teams are fielded in men's soccer, women's volleyball, men's and women's basketball, women's soccer, baseball, and cross-country.

In 2023 the first-ever cheer leading program Co-Ed Game Day Cheer, was added to Arrupe. Since then, Coach Mandi Lopez has led the team to an undefeated three-peat of state championships making history as the first sport at Arrupe to ever win a state title.
