= Cristo Rey Jesuit High School (Chicago) =

Location
- 1852 West 22nd Place; Chicago, Illinois 60608; United States; 41°51′6″N 87°40′22″W

Information
- Type: Private high school
- Motto: Men and Women for Others
- Denomination: Roman Catholic
- Established: 1996; 30 years ago
- Founder: John P. Foley
- Oversight: Cristo Rey Network
- President: Antonio Ortiz
- Principal: Mayra Gradilla (2022-)
- Teaching staff: 31
- Grades: 9–12
- Gender: Male, Female
- Enrollment: 580 (2022)
- Average class size: 20
- Student to teacher ratio: 20:1
- Colors: Maroon and Gold
- Mascot: Lion
- Nickname: Cristeros
- Team name: Lions
- Accreditation: North Central Association of Colleges and Schools
- School fees: No fees
- Tuition: Adjusted to family income
- Affiliation: Cristo Rey Network
- Website: www.cristorey.net

Cristo Rey Jesuit High School is a Jesuit high school on the near Lower West Side of Chicago, Illinois. It is the founding school of the Cristo Rey Network and is affiliated with the Roman Catholic Archdiocese of Chicago. Cristo Rey Jesuit High School was established in 1996 and provides college-preparatory education using a dual-language model. The school places students at entry-level jobs that cover some of their tuition costs.

== History ==
The school opened in 1996. In 1998, the school spent $10 million to add a new 3 story building to the campus. Around 2000, the philanthropist Brendan Cassin visited the school. Cassin was so impressed with the school's program for low income students that, within hours of his visit, he committed to donating $22 million to build a network of similar schools.

== Corporate Work Study Program (CWSP) ==
Richard R. Murray developed the Corporate Work Study Program (CWSP) in 1995 for Cristo Rey Chicago. The work-study program combines employee leasing and job sharing, giving students the means of financing a private high school education. Cristo Rey students attend classes four days a week and work five days a month. Students work in entry-level positions at businesses and non-profit agencies in Chicago. Over 90 companies participate in the CWSP, including banks, law firms, hospitals, consulting firms, and non-profit agencies. The goal is for students to acquire job experience and marketable skills, develop a network of business contacts, gain exposure to a wide variety of career opportunities, and improve in their work ethic and self-esteem. Incorporated as the Cristo Rey Work Study Program, Inc., the CWSP allows each student to earn up to 65% of the cost of their education. Work is considered part of the curriculum; if a student is dismissed from their job, they are considered to have failed that course.

== Academics ==
The college-preparatory curriculum is taught using a dual-language methodology, with thirty percent of the courses taught in Spanish. Honors and Advanced Placement courses are offered and almost all students take at least one Advanced Placement course. A certified nursing assistant program was added in the 2025-25 school year, enabling students to begin working in healthcare as they prepare for college nursing programs.

== Extracurricular activities ==
=== Athletics ===
Forty percent of students participate in the athletics program, including varsity, junior varsity, and intramural sports. Cristo Rey's athletes practice at the local Harrison Park.

=== Sports offered ===
==== Boys ====
- Basketball
- Baseball
- Cross country (co-ed)
- Soccer
- Volleyball
- Track (co-ed)

==== Girls ====
- Soccer
- Softball
- Volleyball
- Cheer (co-ed)
- Basketball
- Track (co-ed)
