= Covenant Christian School =

Covenant Christian School may refer to:

== Australia ==
- Covenant Christian School (Sydney), an independent coeducational pre-K–12 non-denominational Christian day school in Belrose, peshay central Sydney, New South Wales, Australia
- Covenant Christian School (Canberra), an independent coeducational K–10 Christian primary and high school in Canberra, Australia

== United States ==
- Covenant Christian School (Palm Bay, Florida), a private coeducational K–12 Christian school in Palm Bay, Florida
- Covenant Christian School (Panama City, Florida), a private coeducational pre-K–12 Christian school in Panama City, Florida
- Covenant Christian School (Conroe, Texas)

Please also note that there about thirty private primary and secondary schools in the United States with the same or similar name.

== See also ==
- Covenant School (disambiguation)
- Covenant College (disambiguation)
- Covenant Christian Academy (disambiguation)
