= Texas Association of Private and Parochial Schools =

Group of private schools in Texas, United States

- Predecessor: TAPPS
- Formation: 1978
- Type: State Trade Association
- Headquarters: Fort Worth, Texas, U.S.
- Executive Director: Bryan Bunselmeyer
- Website: https://www.tapps.biz

The Texas Association of Private and Parochial Schools, or TAPPS, is an organization headquartered in the Lone Star Tower at Texas Motor Speedway Fort Worth, Texas. It was formerly headquartered at the Salado Civic Center in Salado, Texas. Founded in 1978, TAPPS governs athletic, fine arts, and academic contests for the majority of non-public high schools in Texas. (Note: Texas, unlike most states, has separate organizations for public and private schools (excluding two very large all-male parochial schools which have been allowed to join the University Interscholastic League, the governing body for public schools). However, public and private schools may schedule each other in competition.)

As of 2021, TAPPS organizes competitions for over 230 private schools in Texas.

== History ==
TAPPS was chartered in 1978 with a membership of 20 schools. As of 2022, TAPPS lists their school membership at 230 with a combined enrollment of over 40,000 students. As early as 2013, TAPPS was using a proprietary software called TAPPSter to provide schools with online management tools for athletics and fine arts departments. In 2019, TAPPS signed a State Management contract with Rank One to serve schedules and game results to schools in their membership.

== Controversies ==
=== Admission of Jesuit schools ===
TAPPS merged with the Texas Christian Interscholastic League (TCIL), which governed athletics for mostly Catholic high schools, after the 1999-2000 school year. All of the schools who were TCIL members were allowed to join TAPPS except two urban, all-male schools ran by the Society of Jesus: Dallas Jesuit and Houston Strake Jesuit. The official rationale given for the refusal was that both schools were too large and would effectively dominate TAPPS competition.

After being rejected for membership in the Southwest Preparatory Conference on similar grounds, the two Jesuit schools would play the next three school years as independents, keeping a full regular season schedule of opponents while not being eligible for a state championship of any sort. Both schools had long harbored a desire to join the University Interscholastic League, which sanctions activities for Texas' public schools; however, at the time the UIL constitution explicitly barred private schools from membership. A protracted legal battle ensued before an intervention from the Texas Legislature allowed the Jesuit schools to join the UIL in 2003. The UIL changed its rules after admitting the Jesuit schools to prohibit private schools that are eligible for membership in "any similar organization" from applying to join the league.

=== Muslim and Jewish schools ===
In 2004, Darul Arqam, a Muslim school in Houston, submitted an application to join TAPPS. Khaled Katbi, who represented the school, had a meeting with TAPPS on November 4, 2004, and did not report any unusual questions. However the school subsequently received a letter which included a questionnaire with "Why do you wish to join an organization whose membership is basically in total disagreement with your religious beliefs?" and "Why do you think that the current member schools of TAPPS will not be biased against your school, based on the fundamental difference in your religion and Christianity, since about 90% of TAPPS schools embrace Christianity?" In response the American Civil Liberties Union of Texas stated that TAPPS should be investigated.

In 2010, Iman Academy Southwest, another Muslim school in Houston, submitted an application to join TAPPS. TAPPS responded by asking Iman to complete a questionnaire with questions like "Historically, there is nothing in the Koran that fully embraces Christianity or Judaism in the way a Christian and/or a Jew understands his religion. Why, then, are you interested in joining an association whose basic beliefs your religion condemns?" Iman Academy SW did not fill out the questionnaire and the attached application, and TAPPS denied Iman SW admission into the league. Iman SW did not appeal the decision. As of 2024, the Islamic private school Brighter Horizons Academy is a full member of TAPPS, competing in TAPPS 5A.

In 2012, TAPPS came under harsh criticism after it refused to reschedule a semifinals basketball game scheduled for 9 p.m. on Friday March 2 despite the fact that Robert M. Beren Academy, an Orthodox Jewish school, asked that its players not play on Jewish Sabbath. The school had won the regional championship to advance for their first trip to the semi-finals. An appeal was made by Beren Academy but denied by TAPPS under its bylaws set in the 1970s. TAPPS received legal pressure and pressure from Mayor Annise Parker of Houston as well as hundreds of letters. TAPPS eventually relented and allowed the game to be rescheduled under this pressure.

The controversies with the Muslim schools and Beren drew attention to the point where the Texas Catholic Conference called for a review of the association.

=== Sports officials ===
In 2015, the TAPPS Winter Division 1 Soccer State Championship Game was stopped by Trinity Christian Academy (TCA) coaches and Athletic Director to protest a yellow card that was issued by the referee to a John Paul II player. The TCA AD left the field of play and met with the TAPPS Executive Director. They walked back to the JPII bench together and the TAPPS Executive Director issued an Administrative Red card to the player, overruling the referee in charge of the game. This violated TAPPS section 134 "NO PROTESTS. A protest base on a game or contest official's decision will not be considered" and TAPPS section 27 "...may not protest a contest judge's / referee's or other official's decision". The cause of the controversy was that after scoring a goal to go up 1-0 with 32 minutes left in the game the player removed his jersey on the way to the bench and was issued a yellow card for this unsportsmanlike behavior. JPII was forced to play 10 v 11 for the remainder of the game and lost 1-2.

== Groupings ==
Like the UIL, TAPPS aligns member schools into districts by geography and enrollment size for various contests. Each contest has a slightly different alignment based on the participating schools, but most follow the same basic framework. The districts are mostly decided behind closed doors by TAPPS every even year (in February, around the same time as the UIL's biannual redistricting), and are an attempt to keep schools within a certain distance of their hometown when attending competitions. Like the UIL, the districts are the first progression to the state championship.

Schools are further broken down with a letter classification to separate them from other schools of varying sizes based on average high school enrollment (single-sex schools have their student population average doubled). The purpose is ensured that schools compete only with others with similar size talent pools and resources.

Due to the wide variety of sports that some schools do and do not offer, and because some schools are single-sex, TAPPS uses several different classifications for sports (generally the larger the number the larger the school):

- Volleyball, basketball (boys and girls): 1A, 2A, 3A, 4A, 5A, and 6A
- Football: Divisions I/II and III for six-man football (in I/II the schools are grouped together into districts, but in the playoffs they have separate brackets); Divisions I, II, III/IV (in III/IV the schools are grouped together into districts, but in the playoffs they have separate brackets), plus League (divided into two zones) for the 11-man game
- Baseball Divisions I through V
- Soccer: A single division (Division I) for fall, Divisions I through III for winter (Note: Although fall soccer programs are de facto boys teams, many are co-ed. Some boys' winter soccer programs are co-ed when there are not enough players to form a girls' squad.)
- Softball: Divisions I through IV

In 2021, TAPPS implemented a "special circumstance" classification drop where schools based on their status may appeal to be dropped one classification (for example: a school with a 3A population participating in 2A). This began with the 2022-24 alignment and mainly applies to schools serving low-income students who may have required after-school work hours through the school, dyslexia schools and other special education schools (such as the Lone Star schools), and for those with geographical logistics issues.

== 2026-2028 main alignment ==
TAPPS Alignment 2026-28

=== 6A schools ===
==== District 1 ====
- Liberty Christian (Argyle)
- Nolan Catholic (Fort Worth)
- Parish Episcopal (Dallas)
- Trinity Christian (Addison)

==== District 2 ====
- Bishop Lynch (Dallas)
- John Paul II (Plano)
- Legacy Christian (Frisco)
- Prestonwood Christian (Plano)
- Ursuline (Dallas) (girls only)

==== District 3 ====
- Antonian Prep (San Antonio)
- Central Catholic (San Antonio) (boys only)
- Incarnate Word (San Antonio) (girls only)
- St. Dominic Savio (Austin)
- St. Michael's Catholic (Austin)

==== District 4 ====
- Concordia Lutheran (Tomball)
- Incarnate Word (Houston) (girls only)
- Lutheran South (Houston)
- St. Agnes Academy (Houston) (girls only)
- St. John XXIII (Katy)
- St. Pius X (Houston)
- St. Thomas (Houston) (boys only)
- Village (Houston)

==== Independent ====
- Cathedral High School (El Paso) (boys only)
- Loretto Academy (El Paso) (girls only)

=== 5A schools ===
==== District 1 ====
- All Saints' Episcopal (Fort Worth)
- Fort Worth Christian (North Richland Hills)
- Grace Prep (Arlington)
- Grapevine Faith
- Midland Christian
- Southwest Christian (Fort Worth)

==== District 2 ====
- Bishop Dunne (Dallas)
- Brighter Horizons (Garland)
- Brook Hill (Bullard)
- Cristo Rey (Dallas)
- Grace Community (Tyler)
- McKinney Christian

==== District 3 ====
- Brentwood Christian (Austin)
- Hill Country Christian (Austin)
- Hyde Park (Austin)
- Regents (Austin)

==== District 4 ====
- John Paul II (Schertz)
- Providence HS (San Antonio) (girls only)
- San Antonio Christian
- St. Anthony (San Antonio)
- St. Augustine (Laredo)
- St. Joseph (Brownsville)

==== District 5 ====
- Cypress Christian
- Fort Bend Christian (Sugar Land)
- Logos Prep (Sugar Land)
- Second Baptist (Houston)
- St. Joseph (Victoria)
- Emery/Weiner (Houston)

==== District 6 ====
- Frassati Catholic (Spring)
- Legacy Christian (Magnolia)
- Kelly Catholic (Beaumont)
- Woodlands Christian (The Woodlands)

=== 4A schools ===
==== District 1 ====
- Covenant Classical (Fort Worth)
- Lubbock Christian
- Midland Classical
- Trinity Christian (Lubbock)
- Trinity Christian (Willow Park)
- Trinity School of Midland

==== District 2 ====
- Chisholm Trail (Keene)
- Coram Deo (Flower Mound)
- Covenant Christian (Colleyville)
- Lake Country Christian (Fort Worth)
- Pantego Christian (Arlington)
- Prince of Peace (Carrollton)

==== District 3 ====
- All Saints Episcopal (Tyler)
- Coram Deo (Plano)
- Covenant (Dallas)
- Dallas Christian (Mesquite)
- Heritage Christian (Rockwall)
- Shelton (Dallas)

==== District 4 ====
- Brazos Christian (Bryan)
- Live Oak Classical (Waco)
- Round Rock Christian
- Texas School for the Deaf (Austin)
- Vanguard Prep (Waco)
- Veritas (Austin)

==== District 5 ====
- Castle Hills (San Antonio)
- Geneva (Boerne)
- Holy Cross (San Antonio)
- Incarnate Word (Corpus Christi)
- New Braunfels Christian
- St. John Paul II (Corpus Christi)

==== District 6 ====
- Bay Area Christian (League City)
- British International School of Houston (Katy)
- Covenant Christian (Conroe)
- First Baptist (Pasadena)
- St. Francis Episcopal (Piney Point Village)
- St. Thomas Episcopal (Houston)

=== 3A schools ===
==== District 1 ====
- Abilene Christian
- Burton Adventist (Arlington)
- Christian Life Prep (Fort Worth)
- Denton Calvary
- Lone Star-North (Gainesville) (boys only)
- Nazarene Christian (Crowley)
- Temple Christian (Fort Worth)
- Weatherford Christian

==== District 2 ====
- Dallas International
- First Baptist (Dallas)
- Highlands (Irving)
- Lakehill Prep (Dallas)
- Valor Prep (Waco)
- Yavneh Academy (Dallas)

==== District 3 ====
- Bishop Gorman (Tyler)
- Cornerstone Christian (McKinney)
- Einstein (Plano)
- Garland Christian
- Lucas Christian
- Wylie Prep

==== District 4 ====
- Bracken Christian (Bulverde)
- Central Texas Christian (Temple)
- Faith Academy (Marble Falls)
- Keystone (San Antonio)
- Lutheran (San Antonio)
- San Juan Diego (Austin)
- San Marcos Academy

==== District 5 ====
- Alpha Omega (Huntsville)
- Cathedral (Houston)
- Legacy Christian (Beaumont)
- Lone Star-Southeast (Giddings) (boys only)
- Northland Christian (Houston)
- Providence Classical (Spring)
- Rosehill Christian (Tomball)
- Westbury Christian (Houston)

==== Independent ====
- Immanuel Christian (El Paso)
- Lydia Patterson Institute (El Paso)

=== 2A schools ===
==== District 1 ====
- All Saints Episcopal (Lubbock)
- Holy Cross (Midland)
- Kingdom Prep (Lubbock)
- Southcrest Christian (Lubbock)

==== District 2 ====
- Azle Christian
- Bethesda Christian (Fort Worth)
- Fellowship Academy (Kennedale)
- Harvest Christian (Keller)
- Mercy Culture Prep (Fort Worth)
- Sacred Heart (Muenster)
- Victory Christian (Decatur)

==== District 3 ====
- Alcuin (Dallas)
- Cambridge (Dallas)
- Christian Heritage (Longview)
- Longview Christian
- North Dallas Adventist (Richardson)
- Ovilla Christian (Red Oak)

==== District 4 ====
- Allen Academy (Bryan)
- Austin Waldorf
- Concordia (Pflugerville)
- Divine Savior (Liberty Hill)
- Memorial Christian (Killeen)
- Reicher Catholic (Waco)
- St. Joseph Catholic (Bryan)
- Summit Christian (Cedar Park)

==== District 5 ====
- Divine Savior (Missouri City)
- Houston Adventist (Cypress)
- Sacred Heart (Hallettsville)
- School of the Woods (Houston)
- SBSUM-Memorial (Houston)
- St. Paul (Shiner)

==== District 6 ====
- Baytown Christian
- Brazosport Christian (Lake Jackson)
- Briarwood (Houston)
- Calvary Baptist (Willis)
- O’Connell (Galveston)

==== Independent ====
- Prestonwood Christian-North (Prosper)

=== 1A schools ===
==== District 1 ====
- Accelerate Christian (Amarillo)
- Ascension Academy (Amarillo)
- Christ the King (Lubbock)
- Holy Cross (Amarillo)
- Jesus Chapel (El Paso)
- San Jacinto Christian (Amarillo)

==== District 2 ====
- Christ Academy (Wichita Falls)
- Cornerstone Christian (Granbury)
- StoneGate Christian (Irving)
- Texoma Christian (Sherman)
- Victory Baptist (Weatherford)
- Wichita Christian (Wichita Falls)

==== District 3 ====
- Clariden (Southlake)
- Dallas Lutheran
- Fairhill (Dallas)
- Providence Academy (Rockwall)
- Westwood (Dallas)
- Winston (Dallas)
- Waxahachie Prep (Waxahachie)

==== District 4 ====
- Greenville Christian
- Poetry Community (Terrell)
- Regents Academy (Nacogdoches)
- St. Boniface (Nacogdoches)
- St. Mary's Catholic (Longview)
- Trinity School (Longview)

==== District 5 ====
- Austin Classical
- Cornerstone Christian (San Angelo)
- Heritage (Fredericksburg)
- Holy Trinity Catholic (Temple)
- Our Lady of the Hills (Kerrville)
- San Angelo Christian

==== District 6 ====
- First Baptist (Brownsville)
- Harvest Christian (Edinburg)
- Juan Diego (Mission)
- Macedonian Christian (Alamo)
- Presbyterian Pan American (Kingsville)
- South Texas Christian (McAllen)

==== District 7 ====
- Annapolis Christian
- Faith Academy (Victoria)
- First Baptist (Universal City)
- Gateway Christian (San Antonio)
- Hill Country Christian (San Marcos)
- Legacy Christian (San Antonio)

==== District 8 ====
- Covenant Academy (Cypress)
- Covenant Prep (Kingwood)
- Faith Lutheran (Giddings)
- Founders Christian (Spring)
- Humble Christian
- SBSUM-Cypress
- SBSUM-North (Kingwood)

==== District 9 ====
- Angleton Christian
- Berean Christian (Katy)
- Chinquapin (Highlands)
- Faith Academy (Bellville)
- Grace Christian (Houston)
- Memorial Lutheran (Houston)
- Beren Academy (Houston)
- Westlake Lutheran (Richmond)

== See also ==
- List of private schools in Texas
- Southwest Preparatory Conference
