= Covenant School =

Covenant School may refer to:

- Covenant School (Texas)
- The Covenant School (Virginia)
- The Covenant School (Tennessee), location of the 2023 Covenant School shooting

== See also ==
- Covenant Christian School (disambiguation)
- Covenant College (disambiguation)
