= Covenant College (disambiguation) =

Covenant College is a college on Lookout Mountain, in Georgia, near Chattanooga, Tennessee, in the USA

It may also refer to:

- Covenant Bible College Canada, a former college in Strathmore, Alberta, Canada
- Covenant Christian School (Canberra), K-10 school formerly known as Covenant College, Canberra, Australia
- Covenant College (Geelong), K-12 school in Geelong, Victoria, Australia

== See also ==
- Covenant University, Nigeria
- Covenant School (disambiguation)
- Covenant Christian School (disambiguation)
