= Enow Etta =

American football player (born 2005)

No. 17 – Michigan Wolverines
- Position: Defensive tackle
- Class: Senior

Personal information
- Born: March 17, 2005 (age 21)
- Listed height: 6 ft 5 in (1.96 m)
- Listed weight: 328 lb (149 kg)

Career information
- High school: Covenant Christian Academy (Colleyville, Texas)
- College: Michigan (2023–present)
- Stats at ESPN

Enow-M'beleke Etta (born March 17, 2005) is an American college football defensive tackle for the Michigan Wolverines.

== Early life ==
Etta attended Covenant Christian Academy in Colleyville, Texas. He had 17 sacks his sophomore year, 22.5 his junior and 20 his senior year. He committed to the University of Michigan to play college football.

== College career ==
Etta was a backup his first three years at Michigan from 2023 to 2025, recording 20 tackles and one sack over 26 games. He entered the transfer portal after the 2025 season, but returned to Michigan. He opened the 2026 season as a first-time starter.
