= NBCA =

NBCA may refer to:

- Narrow Burst Cutting Area
- National Basketball Coaches Association, union representing NBA coaches
- National Baptist Convention of America
- National Biodiversity Conservation Area
- n-Butyl cyanoacrylate
- New Braunfels Christian Academy
- New Brunswick Court of Appeal
- New Brunswick Curling Association
- Nuneaton and Bedworth Community Association
- National Band Council of Australia
