= World Affairs Councils of America =

American international education organization

The World Affairs Councils of America
- Formation: 1986; 40 years ago
- Type: Nonprofit educational/cultural organization
- Headquarters: 1000 Vermont Avenue NW, Suite 900, Washington, DC 20005 United States
- Chairman: Glenn Creamer
- President & CEO: Matthew Hughes
- Revenue: $1,099,525 (2024)
- Expenses: $1,098,426 (2024)
- Website: worldaffairscouncils.org

The World Affairs Councils of America is a network of 90 autonomous and nonpartisan councils serving 43 states. As of 2024, it has an annual reach of over 250,000 people. It is the largest nonprofit international affairs organization in the United States.

== History ==
The World Affairs Councils of America was founded in 1918 as the League of Free Nations, which later reconstituted as the Foreign Policy Association. As World Affairs Councils were created across the United States, the World Affairs Councils of America National Office was founded in the 1986 to serve as a central hub for the network in Washington, DC.

In mid-February 2011, Chairman of the Board Ambassador Marc Grossman stepped down to become the United States Special Envoy to Afghanistan and Pakistan, replacing Richard Holbrooke. In June 2011, Ambassador Paula Dobriansky filled the position of Chair of the National Board. In June 2015, WACA announced that Ambassador Roman Popadiuk who served as the first United States Ambassador to Ukraine under George H. W. Bush, from 1992 to 1993, has been elected the new chairman of the national Board of Directors. Following a three-month co-chair period, Glenn Creamer succeeded Popadiuk as chairman in November 2020, chosen for his work as chairman of the Catholic Relief Services Foundation.

In 2014, the World Affairs Councils of America won the Diversity and Inclusion (DANDI) Award in the international category.

== Programs ==
The World Affairs Councils of America supports a network of 90 councils who present programs annually. The Councils sponsor international exchanges, school programs, teachers workshops, foreign policy discussions, travel programs, young professionals’ programs, conferences, and corporate programs.

=== National Conference ===
The national office organizes an annual conference, usually held in November in Washington, DC. Each conference is thematically organized, and includes speakers from think tanks, embassies, governments, non governmental organizations, and corporations. At the conference closing lunch, several awards are given, including Council of the year, the Chairman's individual of the year, and the International Service Award. Previous International Service Award honorees include Ambassador Thomas Pickering, Linda Thomas-Greenfield, former Secretary of State James Baker, and Ngozi Okonjo-Iweala.

=== Academic WorldQuest ===
Academic WorldQuest is an annual team-based international affairs, geography, history, and culture competition for high school students sponsored by the World Affairs Councils of America. The WorldQuest has been held every year since 2003. WorldQuest was created in 1995 by Jennifer Watson Roberts of the World Affairs Council of Charlotte.

In order to compete at the Carlos and Malú Alvarez National Academic WorldQuest competition, teams must first win at their regional council level (usually held from November to March). Every year, thousands of high school students across the country participate in local competitions hosted by their World Affairs Council. Previous national competition venues include the U.S. Institute of Peace and the National Press Club.

National champions
Year	High School	Council
2025	Cedar Cliff High School	World Affairs Council of Harrisburg
2024	DuPont Manual High School	World Affairs Council of Kentucky and S. Indiana
2023	Plano West Senior High School	World Affairs Council of Dallas/Fort Worth
2022	Keystone School	World Affairs Council of San Antonio
2021	Plano West Senior High School	World Affairs Council of Dallas/Fort Worth
2020	Canceled Due to COVID-19	
2019	Jasper High School	World Affairs Council of Dallas/Fort Worth
2018	Plano West Senior High School	World Affairs Council of Dallas/Fort Worth
2017	Plano West Senior High School	World Affairs Council of Dallas/Fort Worth
2016	Keystone School	World Affairs Council of San Antonio
2015	DuPont Manual High School	World Affairs Council of Kentucky and S. Indiana
2014	Plano West Senior High School	World Affairs Council of Dallas/Fort Worth
2013	Plano West Senior High School	World Affairs Council of Dallas/Fort Worth
2012	Plano Senior High School	World Affairs Council of Dallas/Fort Worth
2011	Plano Senior High School	World Affairs Council of Dallas/Fort Worth
2010	DuPont Manual High School	World Affairs Council of Kentucky and S. Indiana
2009	DuPont Manual High School	World Affairs Council of Kentucky and S. Indiana
2008	North Carolina School of Science and Mathematics	International Affairs Council of Raleigh
2007	Daniel Hand High School	World Affairs Forum (Stamford)
2006	Thomas Jefferson High School for Science and Technology	World Affairs Council of Washington D.C.
2005	Taylor Allderice High School	World Affairs Council of Pittsburgh
2003	The Kinkaid School	World Affairs Council of Greater Houston

=== National delegations ===
For more than a decade, the WACA has been invited to bring small delegations of council leaders to learn about a host country. A leadership mission consists of an overseas fact-finding visit to a city, country, or organization by a delegation of the World Affairs Council.

Host Countries
Year	Country	Year	Country
1998	China	2006	Taiwan
	South Korea		Tunisia
	Taiwan	2007	Germany
1999	Japan		Saudi Arabia
	Singapore		Taiwan
2000	Morocco	2008	Israel
	Northern Ireland		South Korea
2001	Taiwan		UAE
2002	Israel	2009	China
	Lebanon		Iraq
	Libya		Oman
2003	Jordan	2010	Taiwan
	Mexico	2011	Azerbaijan
	Poland		Taiwan
1996	Japan	2012	Afghanistan
1997	Brazil		China
2004	Kuwait	2013	Taiwan
	Lebanon	2014	China
	Taiwan	2015	Taiwan
2005	Egypt	2016	Israel
2018	Qatar		
EU/NATO			

=== Engage America Speakers Series ===
The Speakers Series includes partnerships between the National Office and think tanks, foundations, publishing companies, and government agencies to provide speakers to America's communities through our local councils on the critical global issues of our times. Recent organizations have included NATO, the Korean Economic Institute, and the International Labour Organization.

== Individual councils ==
Councils are funded through membership dues, corporate sponsorships, grants, in-kind donations, fundraising events, and fee-for-service activities.

State	Name	Office
Alabama	Alabama World Affairs Council	Wetumpka
Alaska	Alaska World Affairs Council	Anchorage
Alaska	Juneau World Affairs Council	Juneau
Arizona	Global Ties AZ	Phoenix
California	World Affairs Council of Orange County	Irvine
California	Los Angeles World Affairs Council	Los Angeles
California	World Affairs Council of Monterey Bay Area	Monterey
California	World Affairs Council of the Desert	Palm Springs
California	Commonwealth Club World Affairs	San Francisco
California	San Diego World Affairs Council	San Diego
California	World Affairs Council of Sonoma County	Santa Rosa
Colorado	Colorado Springs World Affairs Council	Colorado Springs
Colorado	World Denver	Denver
Colorado	Colorado Foothills World Affairs Council	Littleton
Connecticut	World Affairs Council of Connecticut	Hartford
Connecticut	Southeast Connecticut World Affairs Council	Waterford
Florida	World Affairs Council of Jacksonville	Jacksonville
Florida	World Affairs Council of Miami	Miami
Florida	Naples Council on World Affairs	Naples
Florida	World Affairs Council of Palm Beach	Boynton Beach
Florida	Sarasota World Affairs Council	Sarasota
Georgia	World Affairs Council of Atlanta	Atlanta
Georgia	Savannah Council on World Affairs	Savannah
Hawaii	Pacific and Asian Affairs Council	Honolulu
Illinois	Peoria Area World Affairs Council	Peoria
Illinois	World Affairs Council of Central Illinois	Springfield
Indiana	Indiana Council on World Affairs	Indianapolis
Iowa	World Affairs Council of the Quad Cities	Davenport-Bettendorf
Iowa	Iowa City Foreign Relations Council	Iowa City
Kentucky	World Affairs Council of Kentucky and Southern Indiana	Louisville
Kentucky	World Affairs Council of Cincinnati and Northern Kentucky	Highland Heights
Louisiana	World Affairs Council of New Orleans	New Orleans
Maine	World Affairs Council of Maine	Portland
Maryland	Baltimore Council on Foreign Affairs	Baltimore
Massachusetts	WorldBoston	Boston
Massachusetts	World Affairs Council of Western Massachusetts	Springfield
Massachusetts	Worcester World Affairs Council	Boylston
Michigan	World Affairs Council of Detroit	Detroit
Michigan	World Affairs Council of Western Michigan	Grand Rapids
Michigan	International Affairs Forum	Traverse City
Minnesota	Global Minnesota	Minneapolis
Missouri	International Relations Council	Kansas City
Missouri	World Affairs Council of St. Louis	St. Louis
Montana	Montana World Affairs Council	Missoula
Nebraska	Nebraska World Affairs Council	Bellevue
Nevada	World Affairs Council of Las Vegas	Las Vegas
New Hampshire	World Affairs Council of New Hampshire	Manchester
New Mexico	World Affairs Council of Albuquerque	Albuquerque
New Mexico	Global Santa Fe	Santa Fe
New York	International Center of the Capital Region	Troy
New York	Foreign Policy Association	New York City
New York	World Affairs Council of Mid-Hudson Valley	Poughkeepsie
New York	World Affairs Council of Rochester	Rochester
North Carolina	World Affairs Council of Western North Carolina	Asheville
North Carolina	World Affairs Council of Charlotte	Charlotte
Ohio	Cleveland Council on World Affairs	Cleveland
Ohio	Columbus Council on World Affairs	Columbus
Ohio	Dayton Council on World Affairs	Dayton
Ohio	World Affairs Council of Northwest Ohio	Perrysburg
Oregon	WorldOregon	Portland
Pennsylvania	World Affairs Council of Harrisburg	Harrisburg
Pennsylvania	World Affairs Council of Philadelphia	Philadelphia
Pennsylvania	World Affairs Council of Pittsburgh	Pittsburgh
Pennsylvania	World Affairs Council of Greater Reading	Reading
Rhode Island	World Affairs Council of Rhode Island	Narragansett
South Carolina	Columbia World Affairs Council	Columbia
South Carolina	World Affairs Council of Hilton Head	Hilton Head
South Carolina	World Affairs Council of Charleston	Charleston
South Carolina	World Affairs Council Upstate	Greenville
South Dakota	South Dakota World Affairs Council	Brookings
Tennessee	Tennessee World Affairs Council	Nashville
Texas	World Affairs Council of Austin	Austin
Texas	World Affairs Council of South Texas	Corpus Christi
Texas	World Affairs Council of Dallas/Fort Worth	Dallas
Texas	World Affairs Council of Greater Houston	Houston
Texas	World Affairs Council of Laredo	Laredo
Texas	World Affairs Council of San Antonio	San Antonio
Utah	Utah Global Diplomacy	Murray
Vermont	Vermont Council on World Affairs	Burlington
Vermont	Windham World Affairs Council	Brattleboro
Virginia	World Affairs Council of Hampton Roads	Hampton Roads
Washington	Olympia World Affairs Council	Olympia
Washington	Seattle World Affairs Council	Seattle
Washington	World Affairs Council of Tacoma	Tacoma
Wisconsin	Institute of World Affairs	Milwaukee
