= Covenant Christian Academy =

Covenant Christian Academy may refer to:

- Covenant Christian Academy (Georgia)
- Covenant Christian Academy (Houma, Louisiana)
- Covenant Christian Academy (West Peabody, Massachusetts)
- Covenant Christian Academy (Harrisburg, Pennsylvania)
- Covenant Christian Academy (Colleyville, Texas)

== See also ==
- Covenant Christian School (disambiguation)
- Covenant Classical Academy
