= Dallas Protocol =

Dallas Protocol is a public-private partnership between the City of Dallas in the U.S. state of Texas and the World Affairs Council of Dallas/Fort Worth, established in March 2003. Dallas Protocol works with the Office of the Mayor, City officials, the diplomatic corps and other international stakeholders to represent the City of Dallas in official international activities. It is the responsibility of Dallas Protocol to oversee the City of Dallas' international visitors and dignitary relations as well as its Sister Cities program. Dallas has six sister cities and one friendship city:

- Brno, Czech Republic
- Dijon, France
- Monterrey, Mexico
- Riga, Latvia
- Saratov, Russia
- Taipei, Taiwan
- Sendai, Japan (friendship city)

Dallas Protocol is funded by the City of Dallas, the World Affairs Council of Dallas/Fort Worth and corporate and individual sponsors.
