= Holy Bowl =

Holy Bowl may refer to:

- An annual football game between Central Catholic Marianist High School and Holy Cross High School San Antonio.
- An annual football game between Jesuit High School, Sacramento and Christian Brothers High School, Sacramento
- An annual football game between Providence Christian Academy of Lilburn, Georgia and Hebron Christian Academy of Dacula, Georgia. See: Holy Bowl (Georgia)

An annual High School Football Game in San Diego. Cathedral Catholic High School Vs the All-Boys Catholic High School Saint Augustine.
