= Legacy Christian Academy =

Legacy Christian Academy may refer to:

- Legacy Christian Academy (Minnesota), a private, Christian school in Andover, Minnesota
- Legacy Christian Academy (Ohio), a private, non-denominational Christian school in Xenia, Ohio
- Legacy Christian Academy (Beaumont, Texas), a private, non-denominational Christian school in Beaumont, Texas
- Legacy Christian Academy (Frisco, Texas), a private, non-denominational Christian school in Frisco, Texas
