= Orsa & Winston =

Restaurant in Los Angeles, California, U.S.

- Interactive map of Orsa & Winston

Restaurant information
- Established: September 24, 2013
- Head chef: Josef Centeno
- Food type: Italian- & Japanese-inspired
- Rating: (Michelin Guide)
- Location: 122 W. 4th Street, Los Angeles, California, 90013, United States
- Coordinates: 34°2′54.4″N 118°14′52.9″W
- Seating capacity: 35
- Reservations: Required

Orsa & Winston is a Michelin-starred restaurant in Downtown Los Angeles, California, United States. Led by chef Josef Centeno, it specializes in blending Japanese and Italian dishes with influences from each of the two cuisines. Orsa & Winston offers a five-course omakase tasting menu that changes daily. Dinner is served in two seatings each evening.

== Reviews ==
Orsa & Winston received a Michelin star in 2019, in the inaugural edition of the Michelin Guide for California (previous guides had only covered the San Francisco Bay Area and Greater Los Angeles separately). The following year, it was one of the first restaurants in the city to close in advance of the COVID-19 shutdown, but reopened with a skeleton crew and was named the Los Angeles Times Restaurant of the Year, with the paper praising the way "the fluidity between [Japanese and Italian] cuisines feels organic to Centeno’s cooking and to the pluralism of Los Angeles."

However, by 2022, a review by The Infatuation acknowledged that, while "Orsa & Winston was once one of the most coveted reservations in LA," the authors felt that "after years of pandemic-related tweaks and changes, it's hard to see what the point is anymore." The review went on to state that "Our last meal here was disappointing" and that the menu was "uninspired", with "an unfocused mishmash of Euro-Asian dishes" that gave "the sense you’re supposed to be impressed" but failed to deliver. It closed with a hope that "We believe the real Orsa & Winston will come back, but we’re just going to have to wait for it a little bit longer."

Orsa & Winston retained its Michelin star in the 2022–2025 editions of the Michelin Guide.

== See also ==
- List of Michelin-starred restaurants in California
