= Cane Island (Katy, Texas) =

Subdivision in Katy, Texas, United States

Coordinates: 29.8039°N 95.8395°W

Cane Island is a planned community on the westside of the City of Katy. It is north of Interstate 10. Rise Communities is developing Cane Island.
