= John Paul II Catholic School (Houston) =

Saint John Paul II Catholic School
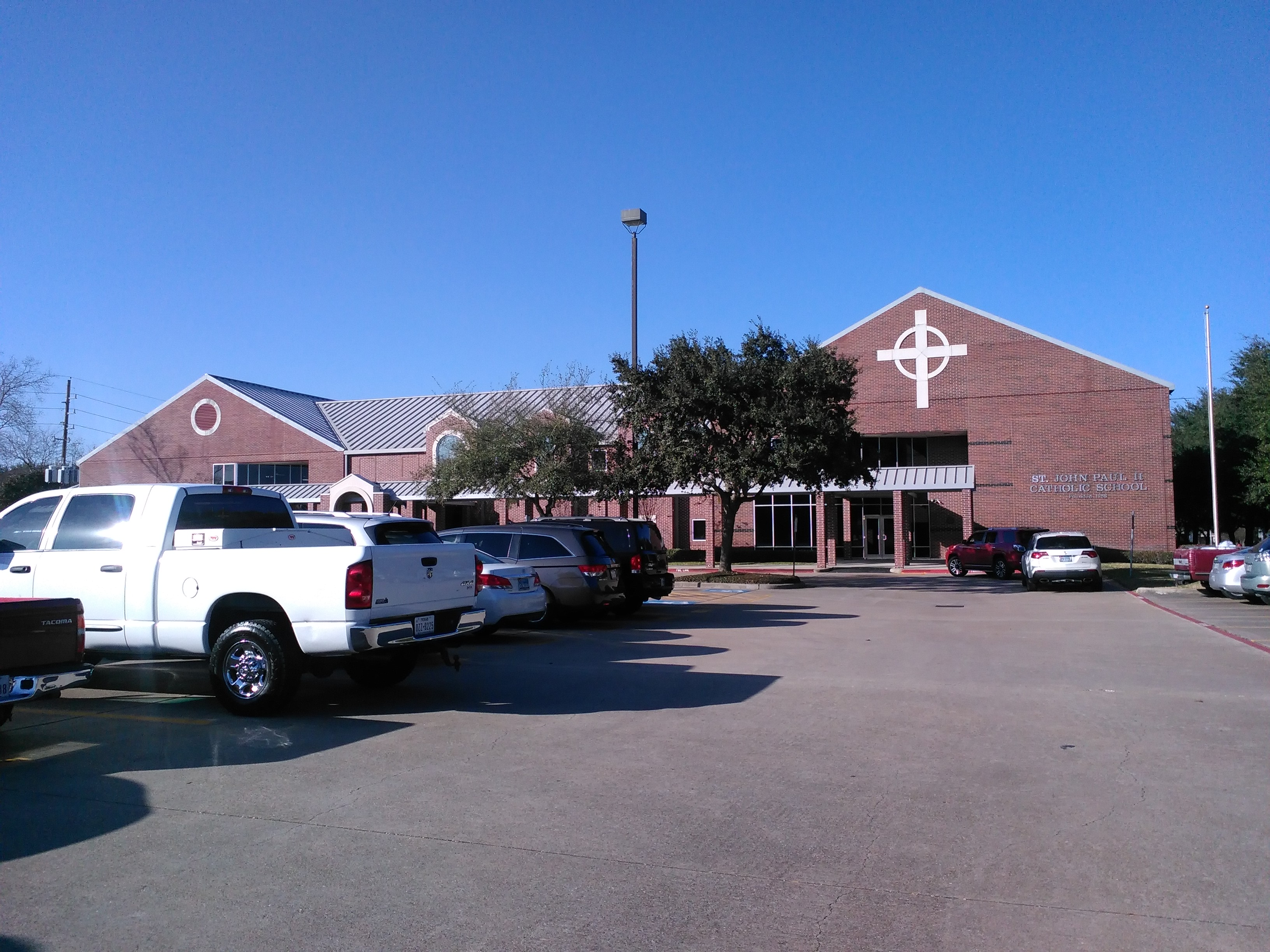
- Campus in 2016

Location
- 1400 Parkway Plaza Drive; Houston, United States, Texas 77077; United States; 29°45′42″N 95°38′1″W

Information
- Type: Private, Co-ed
- Religious affiliation: Roman Catholic
- Patron saint: Pope John Paul II
- Established: 1988
- Authority: Roman Catholic Archdiocese of Houston
- Principal: Rebecca Bogard
- Staff: 23
- Faculty: 52
- Grades: Pre-K–8
- Average class size: 21
- Student to teacher ratio: 17:1
- Campus: Suburban
- Houses: coed
- Colors: Navy Blue, Burgundy, White
- Slogan: Be Not Afraid
- Athletics conference: GHCAA
- Sports: Football, Soccer, Volleyball, Basketball, Baseball
- Mascot: Bernie the Dog
- Nickname: STJP2
- Team name: Saints
- Accreditation: Blue Ribbon (1996–97|2008|2018|2024)
- Newspaper: John Paul II Times
- Yearbook: The Spirit
- Tuition: $7,835
- Athletic Director: Mary Beth Hewitt
- Counselor: Betty Costantini
- Nurse: Maggie Rhoden
- Admissions Director: Kathy Rieder
- Website: www.jp2.org

Saint John Paul II Catholic School (commonly abbreviated to JPII) is a Catholic private school for grades Pre-K through 8th grade in western Houston, Texas. The school is within the Roman Catholic Archdiocese of Galveston-Houston. As of 2008 it serves over 700 students.

== History ==
=== Opening ===
St. John Paul II Catholic School was established in 1988 as a private independent Catholic School and is fully accredited with the Texas Education Agency through the Texas Catholic Conference Accreditation Commission. The school is a registered, non-profit corporation in the state of Texas with a corporate Board of Directors. John Paul II opened with 56 students in Pre-Kindergarten through third grade in the fall of 1988 having temporary trailer buildings as classrooms/offices.

=== National Blue Ribbon School Awards ===
During the 1996–97 school year, 2008, 2018, and now in 2024 St. John Paul II was named a National Blue Ribbon Exemplary School by the U.S. Department of Education. In 2008, the school was one of only fifty private schools to be so honored nationally. Poised for future growth, John Paul II moves forward as a unique Catholic school. Its graduates are currently enrolled in many of the private high schools in the area including Duchesne Academy, Pope John XXIII, St. Agnes Academy, St. Thomas High School, Strake Jesuit, St Pius X, and Incarnate Word Academy.

== See also ==
- Christianity in Houston
