= Lydia Patterson Institute =

Lydía Patterson Institute

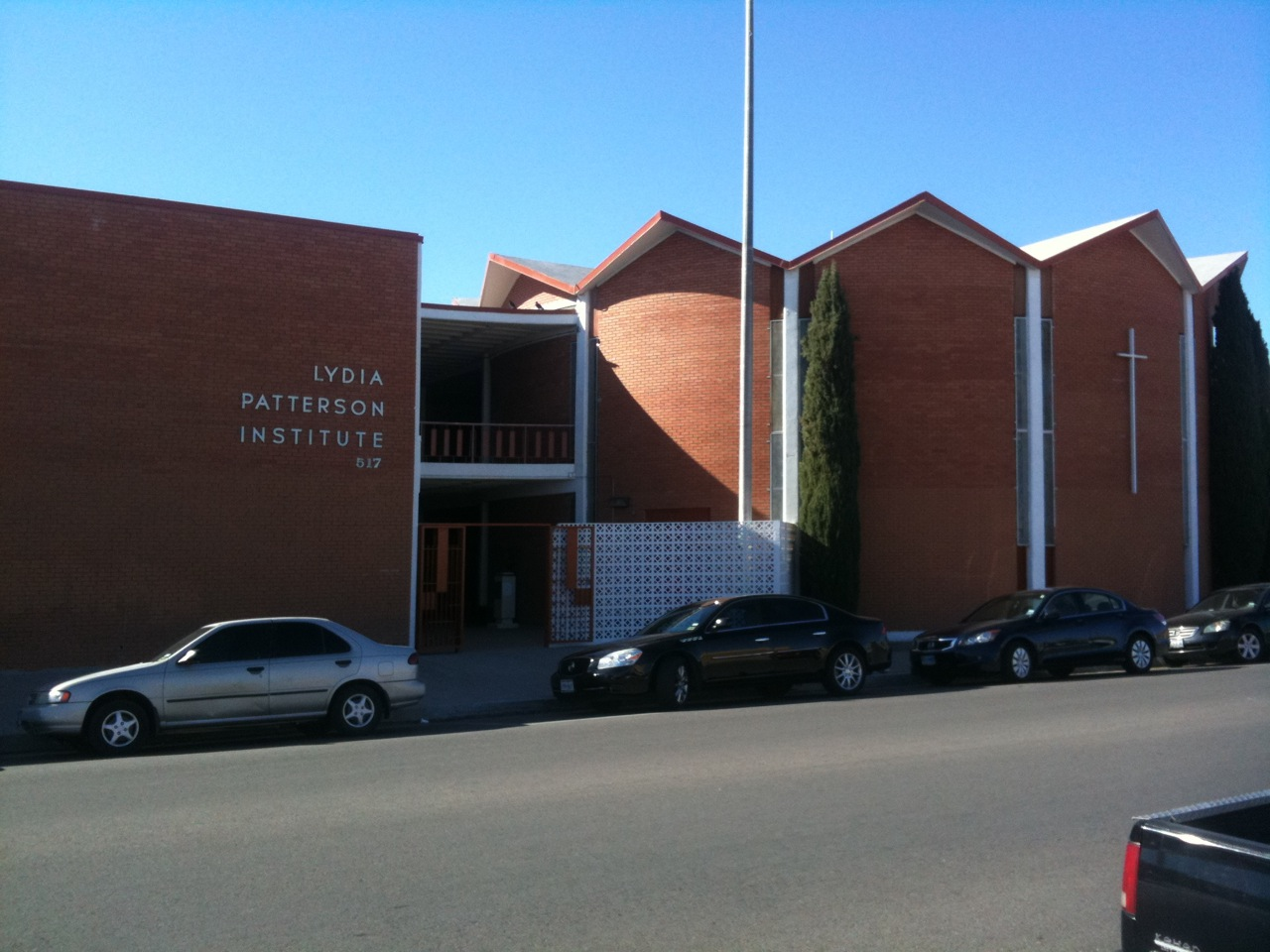

Location
- 517 Florence St. Downtown El Paso; El Paso, (El Paso County, Texas), Texas 79941; United States; 31°45′19″N 106°28′56″W

Information
- School type: Private, Coeducational
- Motto: "Building Bridges Where Faith and Knowledge Intersect"
- Religious affiliation: Christian
- Denomination: United Methodist
- Established: 1913
- Founder: Lydia Patterson
- President: Carla Cardoza
- Principal: Clapsaddle
- Chaplain: Ernesto Barriguete
- Grades: 7–12
- Gender: Coed
- Average class size: 15-30
- Language: English language & Spanish
- Campus: Urban
- Campus type: Closed
- Colors: Burgundy and Grey
- Athletics conference: Texas Association of Private and Parochial Schools & University Interscholastic League
- Sports: Soccer, Basketball, Volleyball, Track and Field
- Mascot: Lion
- Nickname: La Lydia
- Team name: LPI Lions
- Rival: Cathedral, Father Yermo, Loretto Academy
- Accreditation: Southern Association of Colleges and Schools
- Newspaper: LPI Tribune
- Yearbook: "The Pattersonian"
- School fees: Tuition
- Tuition: 2018 - $500/month, $2,400
- Website: lpi-elpaso.org

Lydia Patterson Institute is a Methodist Christian college-preparatory school located in El Paso, Texas, United States. Founded in 1913 it offers programs for Spanish-speaking children, primarily from Ciudad Juárez, Chihuahua to attend high school in the United States and attend a Methodist graduate university. All high school classes are taught in English, and the school is accredited by the Southern Association of Colleges and Schools.

== History ==
At the beginning of the 20th century in El Paso, there were very few educational opportunities for poor Hispanic boys. Since the State of Texas did not provide public education of any kind for non-English speaking students, most Hispanic children in the Second Ward were not receiving any formal education. Lydia Patterson, a Methodist laywoman, recognized the gravity of this problem, and in 1906, she began to set up day classes for boys in the homes of area Methodists. Upon her death in 1909, her husband Millard Patterson, a local attorney, decided to memorialize her by establishing the school that she had envisioned, and in 1913, construction began on the Lydia Patterson Institute. In 1921, LPI became one of the first schools in the country to emphasize the teaching of English as a Second Language, or ESL, merging students into the appropriate grade upon completion of the ESL program.

== Notable alumni ==
- Samy Natera Jr., professional baseball pitcher
