= Keystone School =

Private school in Texas, United States

Coordinates: 29°27′06″N 98°29′37″W

- San Antonio, TX; USA

Information
- Type: Private, Pre K-12
- Motto: Academic Excellence
- Established: 1948
- Head of school: Billy Handmaker
- Staff: 23
- Faculty: 57
- Enrollment: ~490 (pre K-12)
- Average class size: 12-18 students
- Student to teacher ratio: 10:1
- Campus: Urban
- Colors: Red and Black
- Athletics: M Basketball M Soccer W Basketball W Softball W Volleyball
- Athletics conference: TAPPS 3-A
- Mascot: Cobra
- Website: keystoneschool.org

Keystone School is a co-educational private school for students from pre-kindergarten to twelfth grade, located in midtown San Antonio, Texas, United States.

The greater Keystone School consists of the Little School of Keystone, serving PK-3 and PK-4 students, Lower School, serving kindergarten through fourth-grade students, the Middle School, serving fifth- through eighth-grade students, and the Upper School, consisting of the ninth through twelfth grades. Keystone is regarded as one of the most academically competitive schools in the United States and has been acclaimed for its academic performance. It has been placed as one of the best private high schools in America by the Washington Post multiple times and ranked #1 in 2015.

== History ==
The School was established as the Keystone School and Guidance Center in June 1948 with the personal funds of its founders, John H. Eargle and William B Greet. In June 1953, the school moved to its present location at 119 East Craig Place in San Antonio's renowned Monte Vista Historical District. By 1954, Edwin Eargle had added an Upper School to serve students in the ninth through twelfth grades. Accreditation was granted by the Texas Education Agency in the summer of 1957. It is also accredited by the Independent Schools Association of the Southwest. The school has undergone considerable expansion over the past half century, particularly in the last fifteen years, such as the Lloyd W Jary Theater named after the main architect who built it and the construction of the Brown Hall happening in 2026 named after the Brown family.

The Keystone School offers education programs for high school, middle school and elementary students. They offer around 170 courses from credit recovery to world languages.

== Campus ==
Keystone's start of the 20th century Victorian and classical-revival campus occupies nearly a full city block of restored mansions and carriage houses between McCullough, North Main, and Woodlawn Avenues.

The following buildings and facilities can be found on the campus:

- Founders Hall, often referred to as the Main Building, was the first building to be occupied by the school on its present campus. It houses much of Keystone's administrative offices in addition to classrooms, the Dining Hall, and a theatre and dance studio. The building has three floors, the top floor once being occupied by one of the founders of the school.
- E.M.Stevens Hall, located immediately to the east of Founders' Hall on East Craig Place, is another restored mansion. It houses a number of classrooms in addition to the majority of the school's lockers. The building is used primarily by the Upper School.
- North Hall is a restored apartment building that mainly houses classrooms for grades 5–8.
- The Carriage House, built in 1904, is home to the music classroom and a "study-area" for high-schoolers. It was originally used as a stables for what is now Founders' Hall. Efforts to demolish the building in 2002 in order to replace it with a more modern and space-efficient facility were thwarted by the Monte Vista Historic Board.
- West Hall, a restored mansion adorned with large Doric columns on its southern facade, houses the majority of the Lower School's classrooms and facilities, including its library. An electrical fire in April 2006 caused over $100,000 in damages, but the building has since been restored to its original form in the wake of a remarkable community outpouring.
- The Edwin Eargle Library, an old mansion on Woodlawn Avenue, was purchased and restored by Keystone in the 1990s. It had fallen into significant disrepair at the time of the school's purchase of the building, but now houses the Upper School library and computer facilities.
- The Lloyd Jary Performing Arts Center, named for its architect, is immediately to the east of the Eargle Library. The two buildings are connected to one another. The facility was completed in 2000, and is built to resemble an old house as per the requirements of the Monte Vista Historic Board. As a result, the windows on its eastern facade are false.
- The Shadfan Science and Creativity Center, which completed construction in 2014. The building contains updated science labs, technology classrooms, and various other classrooms.
- Brown Hall, A newly established building that was able to be renovated because of a 3 million dollar donation from the Brown Family. The project will be finished in February, 2027.

== Admission ==
Admission to Keystone is selective and limited, and is particularly competitive for prospective students rising into pre-kindergarten and the first and ninth grades. By its own description, the school offers admission "to qualified students without regard to ethnic, racial, or religious backgrounds[...]" and, according to its own records, counts 55% of its student body as being "non-Anglo".

=== Lower School admission ===
Students entering kindergarten and the first through fourth grades are tested for achievement and readiness by the Head of Lower School using standardized tests normed by age. The Head of Lower School may also test other applicants through the fourth grade when recent standardized tests are not available or there are concerns about the match between the applicant and the school's program.

=== Middle and Upper School admission ===
The Independent School Entrance Examination, or "ISEE," is required for applicants to the fifth through twelfth grades. The test, which was developed by the third-party Education Records Bureau, lasts approximately three hours and is offered on a variety of dates. In addition, the Heads of the Middle and Upper Schools personally review the recent test scores and grades of the applicants. The ISEE is often required only when scores are not available or there is a question about matching the curriculum of a previous school with that of Keystone.

== Academics ==
=== Upper School graduation requirements ===
Students in the Upper School must take no fewer than 21 academic courses in order to attain eligibility for the faculty's recommendation that the Headmaster confer a Diploma. These courses must be distributed, as a minimum requirement, in the following manner, wherein a credit of 1.0 is awarded for successful completion of a course conducted five times weekly during the entirety of an academic year:

- 4.0 credits in the Social Sciences
- 3.0 credits in Mathematics
- 3.0 credits in Science
- 2.0 credits in the Foreign Languages
- 1.0 credits in the Fine Arts and Humanities
- 1.0 credits in Physical Education and Sports

All students will have completed no fewer than four Advanced Placement courses by the time of their graduation. No fewer than twelve hours of community service are also required to be eligible for commencement exercises. On average, 20% of the seniors are National Merit Finalists (which means that 20% of the seniors score in the top 0.5% of the SAT exam compared to all students who take the test in the state of Texas). Additionally, the average Keystone senior takes 7 AP exams with an average score of 4.5. Keystone students routinely excel in academic competitions, claiming top individual honors and three team awards at the Alamo Regional Science Fair, with students regularly qualifying for an all-expense-paid trip to the INTEL International Science Fair; recently, students have taken first place in the regional WorldQuest History Day, and placed second at the National competition in Washington DC. Colleges and universities recognize the excellence of students not only through the admissions process, but also through the merit aid awards students receive; during the past three years, Keystone's seniors were awarded an average of $150,000 per student in merit scholarships. Seniors averaged between 1300-1400 on the old SAT. The class of 2008 averaged 2083 out of 2400 on the new SAT. Students in grades K-8 average over 90% on the Stanford Achievement Test. The seniors of 2014 managed to average a score of 2240 out of 2400.

=== Foreign language instruction ===
Students begin their foreign language studies in the Lower School years, taking classes in Spanish. Upper School students are required to study a foreign language for two academic years. Programs are offered in French and Spanish. Those students who prove fluency in both languages are exempted from the credit requirement, but are permitted to pursue off-campus studies in other languages for credit. Upper School language courses may extend to all four years as electives.

=== Science programs ===
Keystone School has history of success in science. Keystone participates at the Alamo Regional Science and Engineering Fair and has even sent hundreds of representatives on to international competitions despite its very small enrollment. In 2006, 31 of 34 students moved on to compete at the ExxonMobil Texas Science and Engineering Fair. At the International Science and Engineering Fair, Keystone students won two grand prizes in 2003, 2004, and 2006, and three grand prizes in 2005. Keystone offers a Science Club to students in the middle school grades. Keystone also participates in Science Bowl. Each summer, Keystone offers a course in Advanced Physiology, the focus of which is the dissection of a cat.

=== Research program ===
In 2005, Keystone student Neela Thangada was named America's Top Young Scientist by the Discovery Channel and in 2006, senior Elizabeth Monier won sixth place individually in the Siemens Westinghouse competition. Class of 2018 student Nia Clements attended the International Science & Engineering Fair and White House Science Fair for her work to find a cure for gastric cancer, earning her attention from Bill Nye, Joe Biden, and Adam Savage as well as a cover for Smore magazine.

=== Advanced Placement ===
As a college preparatory school, Keystone applies a heavy focus to the Advanced Placement (AP) program, which offers students the possibility of earning college credit during their high school years. Sophomores at Keystone are required to take the AP European History course. Courses are offered to prepare Upper School students for the following AP Exams:

- Biology
- Calculus BC
- Chemistry
- English Language
- English Literature
- Environmental Science
- European History
- French Language
- Spanish Language
- Spanish Literature
- United States History
- Computer Science

==== AP performance ====
In 2005, Keystone achieved the nation's highest average test scores in its category in four different AP subject areas. Over the past eleven years, between 55% and 80% of students' scores have been either fours or fives. All AP exams are graded on a one-to-five scale, with most colleges and universities offering credit for scores of or above a three. In May 2005, 100% of students between the tenth and twelfth grades who took the exams scored at least a three. Forty-five students from the classes of 2005 and 2006 were recognized as Advanced Placement scholars. Graduating class sizes are usually in the mid-30s.

== Extracurricular programs and student life ==
=== Field trips ===
As a component of its science education, Keystone offers its students a number of field trip options at many of the grade levels. Students in grades 9 through 12 are offered trips to Olympic National Park, Yosemite National Park, Everglades, and Washington D.C. The vast majority of the students participate in these programs. These trips generally last five and six days. The trips provide opportunities for beginner camping and hiking. They are considered to be a component of the academic program, and those students who do not participate are expected to complete additional academic work as a substitution.

Many middle school students also go on easy overnight field trips. These include a one-night campout at Government Canyon State Natural Area in fourth grade, a cabin trip to Lake LBJ in Marble Falls in fifth grade, Nature’s Classroom Institute in New Ulm for sixth graders, Hunt, TX for seventh graders, and Yellowstone National Park for eighth graders.

=== Music program ===
Students in grades K-7 have regularly scheduled music classes which develop an appreciation for music history, performance and theory. Said courses of music are based upon exploration, participation and experimentation. Students are provided opportunities for performance that include class instruction with various instruments, including xylophones, recorders, guitars, and percussion instruments. Semester-long Rock Lab and Rock Band electives were recently added as a way for music-loving Upper School students to earn an art credit.

=== Athletics ===
In 1998 and 1999, the varsity girls' volleyball team won the TAPPS 5-A State Championship. Though not in the same conference for varsity sports, the school's traditional athletic rival is Saint Mary's Hall, which was once located immediately adjacent to Keystone, on the campus now occupied by the San Antonio Academy. As they are generally regarded among the most preeminent private schools in South Texas, the rivalry has become fierce, and the annual middle school basketball, volleyball and lacrosse games between the two schools are played with great passion by both sides. Due to size differences, the Upper Schools do not generally compete against one another. In recent years, other sports have been emerging. In early Autumn, from September through October, the Middle School Cross Country team competes. Tennis and golf teams have also been organized. Also in 2007-2008 and 2008–2009 the 7th grade then 8th grade boys basketball team won back to back league championships with a record of 26-2 over those two years. 2008-2009 Men's Soccer Team went to the State Championship and finished second in state in the TAPPS 3-A league. Girls 7th grade basketball team won league championship in 2008-2009 as well. In addition to the sports offered below, students can participate on solo teams under Keystone's name.

Fall Interscholastic Sports

- Girls' Volleyball
- Boys' Soccer

Winter Interscholastic Sports

- Basketball

Spring Interscholastic Sports

- Girls' Softball
- Boys' Baseball

The athletics program utilizes many facilities including:

- The Cobra Pit houses the basketball court.
- The Blacktop has a full, outdoor basketball and sport court.
- The Field at Basse and McCullough, commonly known as "Basse McCullough," is the site of soccer practices and games.
- Tony "Skipper" Martinez Softball Field is home to softball practices and home games.
- The Basin also serves as a soccer practice field.

=== Theater ===
Keystone offers a comprehensive theater arts program to all students from Kindergarten through 12th grade. Every grade level is allowed to participate in several productions each year. Keystone's theater arts program includes acting, public speaking, dance, and improvisation as well as behind-the-scenes activities such as set design, stage lighting, and audio mixing.

== Tuition ==
Tuition to Keystone in the 2026–27 school year ranges from $17,220 for kindergarten to $27,529 for grades 9-12. Keystone offers need-based financial aid.
