= Central Catholic Marianist High School =

Central Catholic High School
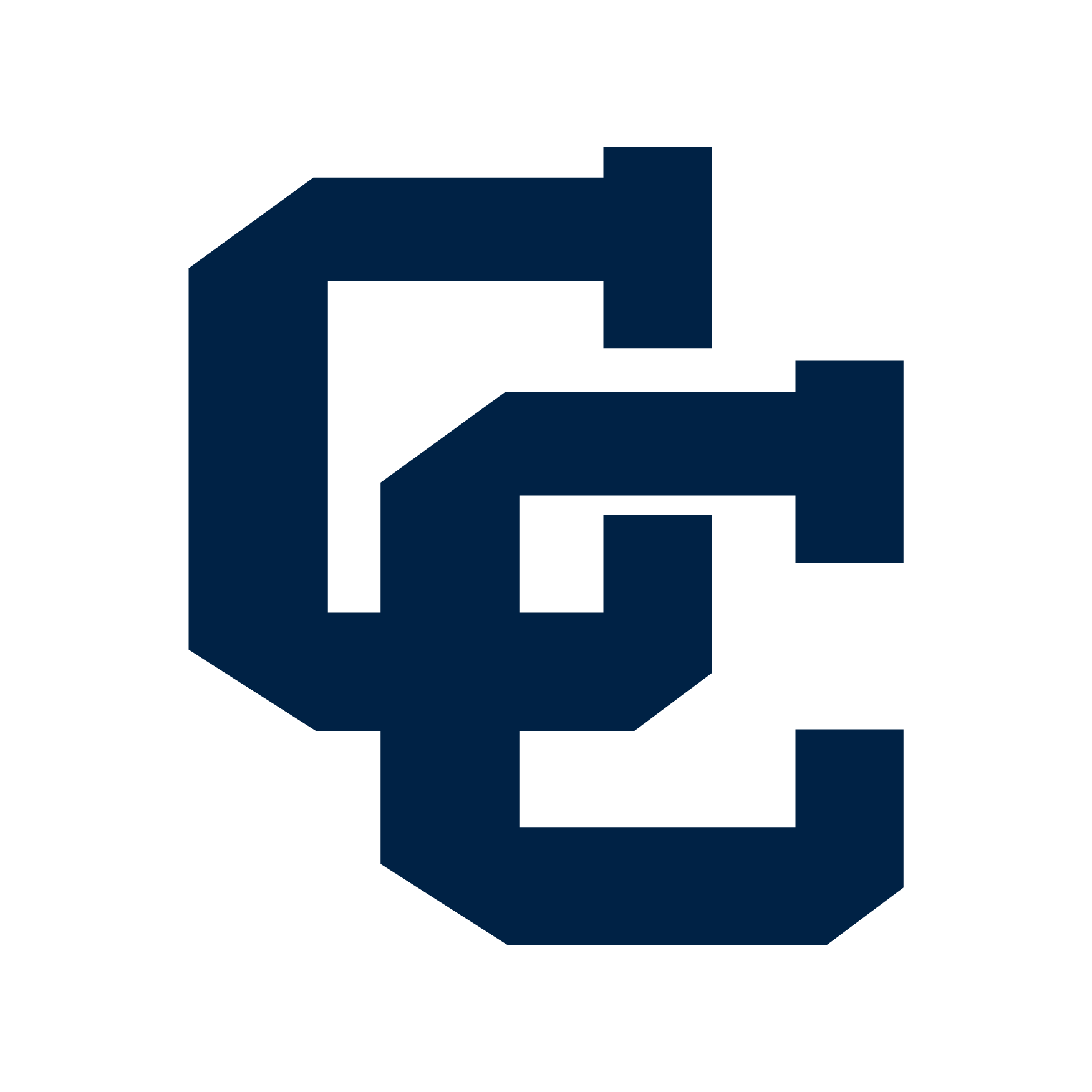

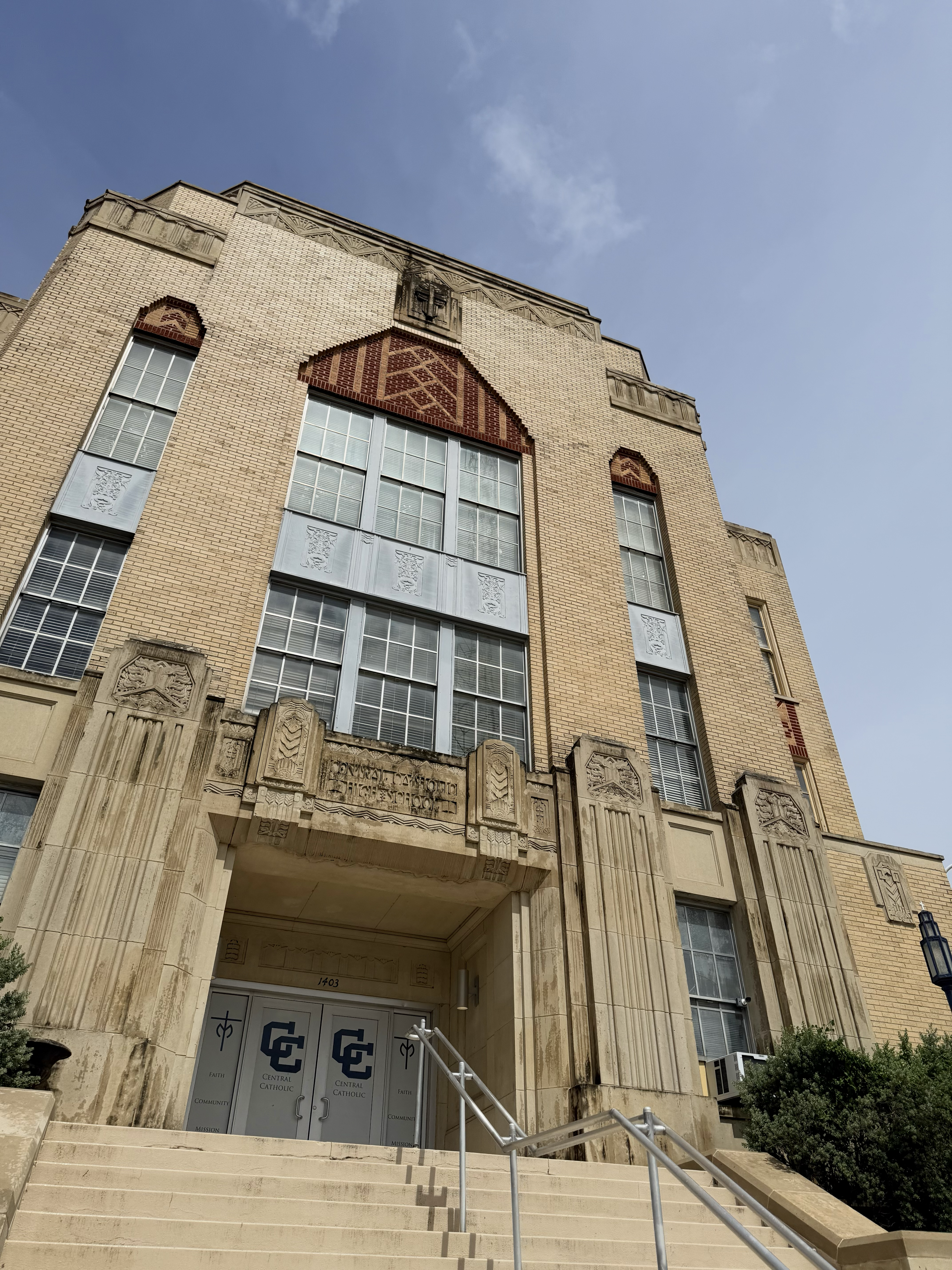
- Saint Mary's Façade

Location
- 1403 N St Mary's St; San Antonio, Texas 78215; United States; 29°26′12″N 98°29′7″W

Information
- Type: Private, Day, College-prep
- Motto: Faith, Wisdom, Integrity
- Religious affiliation: Roman Catholic
- Established: 1852; 174 years ago
- Sister school: Providence High School
- President: Jason Longoria '96
- Chairman: Derrich Rodriguez '94
- Principal: Dr. Lee Hernandez
- Chaplain: Fr. Patrick McDaid, S.M.
- Grades: 9–12
- Gender: Boys
- Enrollment: 546 (2025–2026)
- Student to teacher ratio: 15:1
- Colors: Navy Blue and White
- Song: "With Loyal Hearts"
- Fight song: "Central Will Shine Tonight"
- Athletics conference: TAPPS Class 6A
- Nickname: Buttons
- Accreditation: Southern Association of Colleges and Schools
- Newspaper: The Pep
- Yearbook: The Fang
- Annual tuition: $14,900
- Website: cchs-satx.org

Central Catholic High School is a Catholic, all-male, non-boarding college preparatory school located in the River North District of Downtown San Antonio, Texas, USA, in the Roman Catholic Archdiocese of San Antonio.

== History ==
The school began as St. Mary's Institute on March 25, 1852 in rented rooms above a blacksmith's shop on Military Plaza. The original faculty consisted of Brother Anthony Edel (Founder, First Superior, and First Principal) from Ohio, three Marianist Brothers from Bordeaux, France (Nicholas Koenig, Jean-Baptiste Laignounse, and Xavier Mauclerc), and Timothy O'Neil, a layman from San Antonio.

The school moved to a new two-story building at 112 College Street on March 1, 1853. In 1891, the school was renamed St. Mary's College, reflecting its expansion to include boarders and primary and middle school grades. In 1923, the school added boarding students from St. Louis College and was renamed St. Mary's Academy. The site is now a hotel entryway, recognized by Texas Historical Marker #3819 as the location of Old St. Mary's College, or "The Old Academy."

In 1932, the school relocated to the current three-story art deco brick building on 2.2 acres (0.89 ha) at 1403 N. St. Mary's Street and was renamed once more to Central Catholic School. Classrooms were added to the unfinished third floor in the late 1940s. By 1950 attendance grew to 740, including its first black student in 1951. The third floor was not occupied until 1953. Grade school classes were dropped in 1955. A Dr Pepper bottling plant occupied the northeast corner of the site until 1956. By the end of the 1950s the school added its first lay teacher to its staff, to be evenly split between Marianist brothers and lay people within ten years.

On December 6, 1982, the school was incorporated in the State of Texas as Central Catholic Marianist High School. Upon the assumption by Rev. Joseph Tarrillion, SM, of the presidency, the school's name was changed back to Central Catholic High School. The football field and track were added in the 1980s, and the former activity center became the school's band hall by the 1990s. As of 2012 the campus occupies 12 acres (4.9 ha).

The school expanded in 2013 with the addition of a new library and eight new classrooms attached to the main building, comprising 16,370 sq ft (1,520 m^{2}). In 2019 the 40,000 sq ft (3,700 m^{2}) Kahlig-Cowie Convocation Center & Mother Adele Chapel opened, providing space for athletics and faith.

Central Catholic is one of the oldest high schools in San Antonio, and it counts many prominent business and political leaders among its alumni. It was the first all-boys school in San Antonio and remains one of the largest all-male schools in Texas. Historical Marker #788 on the school's front lawn describes the school's history and denotes it as a Texas landmark.

== Mascot ==
The Central Catholic mascot is the Buttons which are the hard, round segments that comprise the rattle of the rattlesnake. The mascot pays tribute to St. Mary's University, which the high school was originally a part of, whose mascot is the Rattler.

== Athletics ==
Central competes in the Texas Association of Private and Parochial Schools (TAPPS). For the 2022–2024 alignment, Central is in Division I District 2 for Winter Soccer and 11 Man Football and 6A District 2 in Baseball, Swimming, Track and Field, Golf, Tennis, and Basketball. Central competes in Cross Country in the TAPPS 6A division.

== 2025 hazing incident ==
In April 2025 a 15-year-old freshman on Central Catholic’s varsity soccer team reported that he had been bullied and sexually hazed by teammates for several months. The boy and his family alleged assaults in the school locker room—specifically inside a chain-link enclosure nicknamed “the cage”—and during a Texas Association of Private and Parochial Schools (TAPPS) state-tournament trip to Round Rock in early March.

The student’s father filed criminal complaints with both the San Antonio Police Department (SAPD) and the Round Rock Police Department. SAPD initially classified the allegation as indecency with a child and later asked the Texas Attorney General to withhold the incident report, arguing release would interfere with an active investigation.

On June 4, 2025 the school said its internal investigation had resulted in the disciplinary withdrawal of two students—including a senior who was not permitted to graduate—while three others received lesser sanctions; at the same time, the Board of Directors announced it would hire an outside firm to conduct an independent review of team culture, supervision practices and reporting pathways.

By early June at least five additional former or current students had come forward with similar complaints, and their attorney, Jesse E. Guerra Jr., said he was preparing to file a civil lawsuit against Central Catholic, alleging the school knew about the hazing but failed to act.

The school stated that, while the third-party review is under way, faculty or staff “may be placed on administrative leave to ensure the integrity of the investigation and not necessarily as a disciplinary action,” and it reiterated its zero-tolerance stance on bullying and hazing.

On June 20, 2025, Central Catholic’s Board of Directors and School President announced a new long-term partnership with ChildSafe, a San Antonio-based nonprofit specializing in services for child victims of abuse. In their statement, the Board wrote:

Our collaboration with ChildSafe is a long-term commitment that will include: Trauma Sensitive School Program, Staff Development, Safe and Supportive Environment Creation, Needs Assessment and Support Planning, Emotional Skills Building, Family Collaboration, and Policy and Procedure Adaptation.

On July 3, 2025, the parents of the victim filed a 36-page negligence suit in the Bexar County state district court against Central Catholic High School, Principal Lee Hernandez, Athletic Director Edward Ybarra, Head Soccer Coach Bartholomew Valerio, and three student athletes—alleging that over four months beginning in January the school failed to intervene in incidents of bullying, battery, sexual assault and hazing, seeking at least $1 million in damages. Central Catholic has said that they have not been served and declined to comment.

== Notable people ==
=== Alumni ===
- William J. Bordelon, 1938, posthumous recipient of Medal of Honor at Battle of Tarawa, 1943
- Josef Centeno, chef, restaurateur, and cookbook author
- Henry Cisneros, 1964, mayor of San Antonio, 1981–1989, HUD Secretary 1993–1997
- Ben Dunn, 1982, comic book artist and founder of Antarctic Press in San Antonio, TX.
- Nicholas Gonzalez, 1994, actor
- Sonny Melendrez, 1964, Radio Hall of Famer, TV host, actor, writer, and motivational speaker
- Jose Menendez, 1987, member of the Texas Senate, District 26
- Jim Oertling, 1960, musician, Rockabilly Hall of Fame, Louisiana Folklife Center’s Hall of Master Folk Artists
- Michael Anthony Rodriguez, one of the Texas Seven
- Whitley Strieber, 1963, author, screenwriter, and alleged UFO abductee
- William C. Velásquez, 1962, social activist and vote organizer

=== Faculty ===
- John Hamman, brother and English teacher
- Mike Santiago, football coach 2017–2022
