= Christ the King Cathedral School =

Christ The King Cathedral School

Location
- 4011 54th Street; Lubbock, (Lubbock County), Texas 79411; United States
- Coordinates: 33°32′38″N 101°54′1″W

Information
- Type: Private, Coeducational
- Religious affiliation: Roman Catholic
- Established: 1957
- Principal: Christine Wanjura
- Grades: Pre-K-12
- Gender: Male and female
- Age range: 3-18
- Language: English
- Hours in school day: 7 AM through 4 PM school hours
- Colors: Red and white and Gold
- Slogan: "Go with God's purpose"
- Athletics conference: TAPPS
- Sports: Basketball, tennis, golf, track, cross country, football, offseason, volleyball, swim
- Mascot: Trojan/Lion
- Team name: Trojans
- Accreditation: Texas Catholic Conference of Accreditation Commission (TCCAC)
- Website: ctkcathedralschool.org

Christ the King Cathedral School (CTK) is a Catholic school in Lubbock, Texas. CTK was established in 1957. CTK's curriculum ranges from pre-kindergarten through twelfth grade. CTK's high school is the only Catholic high school in the diocese. CTK is accredited by the Texas Catholic Conference of Accreditation Commission. CTK is a Catholic School which has classes of Pre-K to 12th grade. In 2020 the school separated the High School to a Diocesan High School. The new mascot is the Golden Lion. In 2022 the whole school became a Diocesan school.
