= Incarnate Word High School =

School in San Antonio

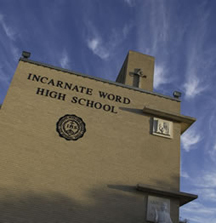

Location
- 727 E Hildebrand Ave; San Antonio, Texas 78212; United States; 29°27′59″N 98°28′33″W

Information
- Type: Private
- Religious affiliation: Roman Catholic
- Established: 1881; 145 years ago
- Founder: Sisters of Charity of the Incarnate Word
- Oversight: University of the Incarnate Word
- President: Sylvia R. Reyna, Ph.D. '74
- Principal: Sylvia R. Reyna, Ph.D. '74
- Grades: 9–12
- Gender: Female
- Enrollment: 320
- Student to teacher ratio: 13:1
- Colors: Green and White
- Athletics conference: TAPPS 6A
- Mascot: Shamrock
- Rival: Antonian; Providence
- Accreditation: Southern Association of Colleges and Schools
- Newspaper: The Star
- Yearbook: Mt. Erin
- Annual tuition: $13,650
- Website: incarnatewordhs.org

Incarnate Word High School is a private, Roman Catholic, all-girls high school in Midtown San Antonio, Texas, United States established in 1881. It is located in the Roman Catholic Archdiocese of San Antonio and is a division of the University of the Incarnate Word.

== History ==
In 1866, facing a cholera outbreak in Galveston immediately after the Civil War and unable to summon help from American congregations, Bishop Claude Dubuis called religious sisters from France to nurse the sick. Three sisters who answered the call along with Dubuis founded the Sisters of Charity of the Incarnate Word. In 1869 Dubius nominated three sisters to start a San Antonio congregation, which subsequently established an infirmary (later to become Christus Santa Rosa Hospital), an orphanage, and a school.

In July 1881 the Sisters of Charity of the Incarnate Word, with a charter from the State of Texas, first opened a schoolhouse for girls on Avenue D which later moved and in 1893 grew into St. Patrick's Academy, considered the forerunner to IWHS and also located on Government Hill. To house the flourishing congregation, in 1897 the sisters purchased 283 acres (1.1 km^{2}) acres of land from George Brackenridge. On the land are the springs that start the San Antonio River. Opening September 13, 1900, the sisters taught just 21 students in the first term at their new convent.

This all-girls boarding school began awarding high school diplomas in 1903, and, at what became College and Academy of the Incarnate Word, awarded its first bachelor's degree in 1910. The sisters opened the five-story administration building in the mid-1920s that served students first grade through college. Texas Association of Colleges recognized Incarnate Word as a senior college in 1920, and the school began graduate studies by 1950.

The school expanded, and in 1950 enrollment necessitated a distinct high school building, constructed at the high school's current location of 727 E Hildebrand Ave, situated on the scenic hill known as Mount Erin. The $1 million building, planned for 750 students, consisted of classrooms, a residence hall to house 150 girls, and a gymnasium. 1961 saw Mount Erin Chapel built, repurposing the original chapel as the testing and academic center. In 1966 Incarnate Word had only one male teacher on staff, only its second male teacher up to then.

In the early 1970s, the high school incorporated modular scheduling (Note: The modular schedule consists of seventeen 20-minute mods, with classes lasting 2-3 mods in length. Students manage their own time to schedule classroom activities, tests, and open labs.) and built its science building, a new library, and swimming pool. In 1978, despite resistance from Sisters of Charity of the Incarnate Word and the San Antonio Conservation Society, the Texas Highway Department constructed US 281 through Incarnate Word school, separating the high school from the college, with the Sky Bridge connecting the campuses as the sisters stipulated. IWHS became part of the Brainpower Connection (Note: The program consists of IWHS, University of the Incarnate Word, St. Anthony Catholic High School and Elementary Schools, St. Mary Magdalen School, Blessed Sacrament School, and St. Peter Prince of the Apostles Elementary School.) with Incarnate Word College (now the University of the Incarnate Word) in 1989.

Incarnate Word's attendance was 590 in 2000, 550 in 2016, and 395 in 2021. The high school is managed independently from the University of the Incarnate Word since the beginning of 2020, and in December 2022 the school announced its first president as part of the new structure.
