= Lake Country Christian School =

Location
- 7050 Lake Country Dr. Fort Worth, Texas 76179; United States; 32.8828705°N 97.4278323°W

Information
- School type: Private
- Established: 1980
- Principal: Julie Ivy PK-5th Hannah Dyksterhouse 6th-8th Dr. Michael Beeson 9th-12th
- Head of school: Sarah Deckert
- Teaching staff: 65 (as of 2023-24)
- Grades: PK-12
- Gender: Coed
- Enrollment: 617 (as of 2023-24)
- Colors: Scarlet Red and Royal Blue
- Athletics: TAPPS 4A
- Mascot: Eagle
- Accreditation: ACSI
- Yearbook: Flight
- Website: https://www.lccs.org

Lake Country Christian School (LCCS) is a private Christian preparatory school in Fort Worth, Texas. Established in 1980, the school serves students in pre-school through grade 12.

== Academics ==
LCCS offers a college preparatory core curriculum. From 2010-2015, the Average Scholarship Per Class was $1,928,689.33.

== Fine arts ==
LCCS theater productions won a Betty Lynn Buckley Award in 2014.

The LCCS Fine Arts Program is supported by the Friends of The Arts and sponsors from around the Fort Worth community.
