= Denton Calvary Academy =

Coordinates: 33.2347°N 97.1091°W

Denton Calvary Academy (DCA, also formerly known as Calvary Preparatory Academy or CPA) is a private, co-educational Christian school in Denton, Texas, United States. DCA is a member of Association of Christian Schools International (ACSI), Southern Association of Colleges and Schools, and the Texas Association of Private and Parochial Schools (TAPPS).

Founded in 1999, DCA serves students from kindergarten through 12th grade. In 1999, it had ninety-five students in grades 1–10. In the 2007-2008 school year, the number of students was 278. As of 2007, DCA has twenty-three teachers and a student–teacher ratio of 12.1.

Denton Calvary Academy's school year has 96 days. Each school day is 7.8 hours.
