= Gabe Klobosits =

American baseball player (born 1995)

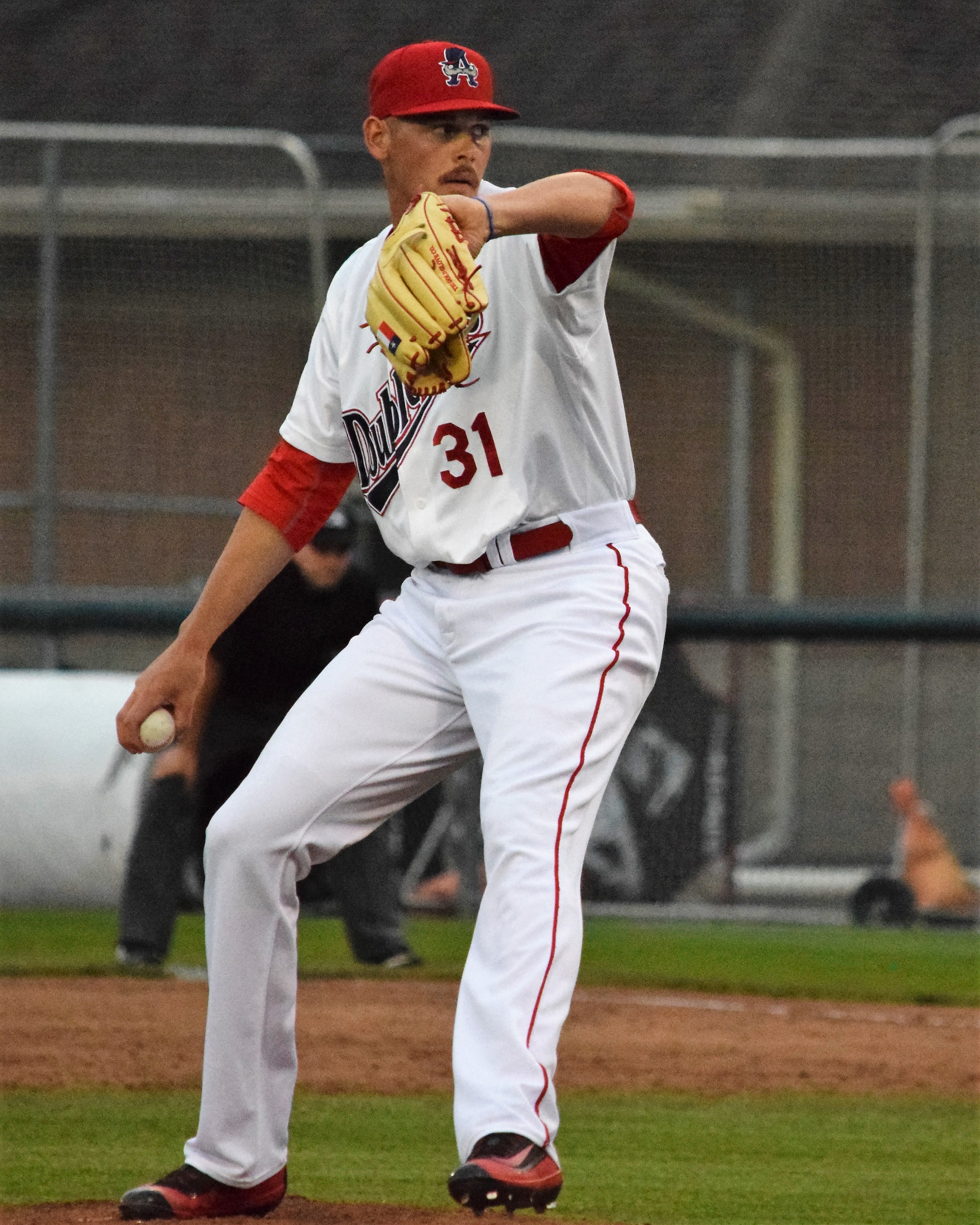
- Klobosits with the Auburn Doubledays in 2017

Chicago Cubs
- Pitcher
- Born: May 16, 1995 (age 31); Katy, Texas, U.S.
- Bats: Left Throws: Right

MLB debut
- July 30, 2021, for the Washington Nationals

MLB statistics (through 2021 season)
- Win–loss record: 0–1
- Earned run average: 6.35
- Strikeouts: 5
- Stats at Baseball Reference

Teams
- Washington Nationals (2021)

Gabriel Michael Klobosits (born May 16, 1995) is an American professional baseball pitcher in the Chicago Cubs organization. He has previously played in Major League Baseball (MLB) for the Washington Nationals.

== Amateur career ==
Klobosits, a native of Katy, Texas, pitched for Pope John XXIII High School and went on to play for the Galveston College Whitecaps. In 2016, he moved to Auburn University and pitched for the Auburn Tigers where he was reunited with his bestfriend, Andres Garcia. In 2017, Klobosits missed the cut for the Tigers' rotation and pitched mostly in long relief. He was drafted by the Nationals in the 36th round of the 2017 Major League Baseball draft and chose to sign with the organization.

== Professional career ==
=== Washington Nationals ===
After signing, Klobosits began his professional career with the rookie-level Gulf Coast League Nationals. He was promoted to the Auburn Doubledays in July and then to the Hagerstown Suns in August. In 30 2/3 relief innings pitched between the three clubs, he was 1–0 with a 1.47 ERA and 1.01 WHIP.

With an imposing physical profile at 6 ft 7 in (2 m) and 270 pounds (120 kg), Klobosits was described in 2017 by Baseball America's Carlos Collazo as having "excellent plane" and a potent mid-90s fastball. He was one of several pitching prospects the Nationals brought up for a simulated game to prepare their major league hitters for the 2017 National League Division Series. Klobosits underwent Tommy John surgery in May 2018 after posting eleven appearances out of the bullpen for the Potomac Nationals. He split the 2019 season between the GCL, Potomac, Hagerstown, going a combined 0–0 with a 2.03 ERA over 26 2/3 innings. He did not play in 2020 due to the cancellation of the Minor League Baseball season due to the COVID-19 pandemic. Klobosits opened the 2021 season with the Harrisburg Senators and the Rochester Red Wings.

On July 30, 2021, Washington selected his contract and promoted him to the active roster. He made his MLB debut that night in relief. Klobosits made 11 appearances for the Nationals during his rookie campaign, posting an 0-1 record and 5.56 ERA with five strikeouts across 11 1/3 innings pitched. On April 6, 2022, Klobosits was designated for assignment by the Nationals.

=== Oakland Athletics ===
On April 11, 2022, the Oakland Athletics claimed Klobosits off of waivers. He appeared in 11 games for the Triple-A Las Vegas Aviators, struggling to a 7.59 ERA with 12 strikeouts in 10 2/3 innings pitched. Klobosits was designated for assignment by Oakland on June 8, following the promotion of Jared Koenig. He was released the same day.

=== Gastonia Honey Hunters ===
On July 5, 2023, Klobosits signed with the Gastonia Honey Hunters of the Atlantic League of Professional Baseball. In eight appearances out of the bullpen, Klobosits registered a 1.13 ERA with seven strikeouts and one save across eight innings of work.

=== Toronto Blue Jays ===
On July 22, 2023, Klobosits signed a minor league contract with the Toronto Blue Jays organization. In 14 games for the Triple–A Buffalo Bisons, he logged a 4.74 ERA with 12 strikeouts across 19 innings pitched. Klobosits elected free agency following the season on November 6.

=== Gastonia Ghost Peppers ===
On April 24, 2024, Klobosits signed with the Gastonia Ghost Peppers of the Atlantic League of Professional Baseball. In 45 appearances for Gastonia, he logged a 5–5 record and 2.18 ERA with 46 strikeouts and 11 saves across 45 1/3 innings of relief. Klobosits became a free agent following the season.

=== Cleburne Railroaders ===
On April 21, 2025, Klobosits signed with the Cleburne Railroaders of the American Association of Professional Baseball. In three starts for Cleburne, he recorded a 3.18 ERA with 12 strikeouts across 11 1/3 innings pitched. Klobosits was released by the Railroaders on June 20.

=== High Point Rockers ===
On July 15, 2025, Klobosits signed with the High Point Rockers of the Atlantic League of Professional Baseball. In 13 appearances (one start) for the Rockets, Klobosits compiled a 3-0 record and 1.64 ERA with 28 strikeouts and one save over 22 innings of work.

=== Chicago Cubs ===
On January 26, 2026, Klobosits signed a minor league contract with the Chicago Cubs. In 27 games (2 starts) with Triple-A Iowa Cubs he threw 33.1 innings going 1-2 with a 3.51 ERA with 39 strikeouts and 5 saves.

On October 31, 2026, Klobosits re-signed with the Cubs on a minor league contract for the 2027 season.
