= Christian Heritage Classical School =

School in Longview, Texas

Coordinates: 32.5888°N 94.7826°W

Christian Heritage Classical School (CHCS) is a private, nonprofit, K–12, classical Christian school in Longview, Texas. It was founded in 1994. Its enrollment is about 300 students. Its mascot is the Sentinel.

== Location ==
CHCS is located north of Longview, Texas, on a 10-acre campus. Facilities include a science lab, library, a football/soccer field, and an indoor basketball court.

== Academics ==
The average staff to student ratio at CHCS is c. 1:15. CHCS offers multiple College Board Advanced Placement (AP) courses, and has had a high percentage of students receive National Merit honors compared to other schools in the area.

== Extra-curricular activities ==
CHCS offers baseball, six man football, cross country, basketball, soccer, volleyball, tennis, track, and golf, as well as choir and strings.

=== Baseball ===
The school won the 2017 TAPPS 2A State Baseball Championship Title.

=== Soccer ===
In 2012, CHCS was the TAPPS (Texas Association of Private and Parochial Schools) 2A state championship in soccer. CHCS was also a state soccer finalist in 2009 and 2010. In 2010, CHS had three players chosen for the TAPPS Fall Soccer All-State first team.

Six Man Football In 2022, the school won the Six Man Div State Championship by a score of 36-20 over Bracken Christian School. Christian Heritage finished the year with a 12-2 record.

== Affiliations ==
Christian Heritage Classical School is a member of the Association of Classical and Christian Schools (ACCS). It is accredited through AdvancED.
