= Covenant Classical School =

Private school in Fort Worth, Texas, United States

Location
- Fort Worth, Texas; United States; 32.7436°N 97.4982°W

Information
- Type: Private, classical Christian
- Established: 1999
- Head of School: Troy Schuknecht
- Grades: K–12
- Enrollment: 433
- Team name: Cavaliers
- Website: covenantfw.org

Covenant Classical School is a classical Christian school in Fort Worth, Texas. It offers education for K–12 and aims to "train students to live and think according to a biblical, Christ-centered worldview." It was founded in 1999, and is accredited by the Southern Association of Colleges and Schools. As of 2025, it had 498 students.

The Covenant Classical Cavaliers compete in the Texas Association of Private and Parochial Schools as a 2A school. The six-man football team won the Division III state title in 2021, as well as the Division II Title in 2022, 2024, and 2025.
