= Saint John XXIII College Preparatory =

Private coeducational school in Katy, Texas

St. John XXIII College Preparatory
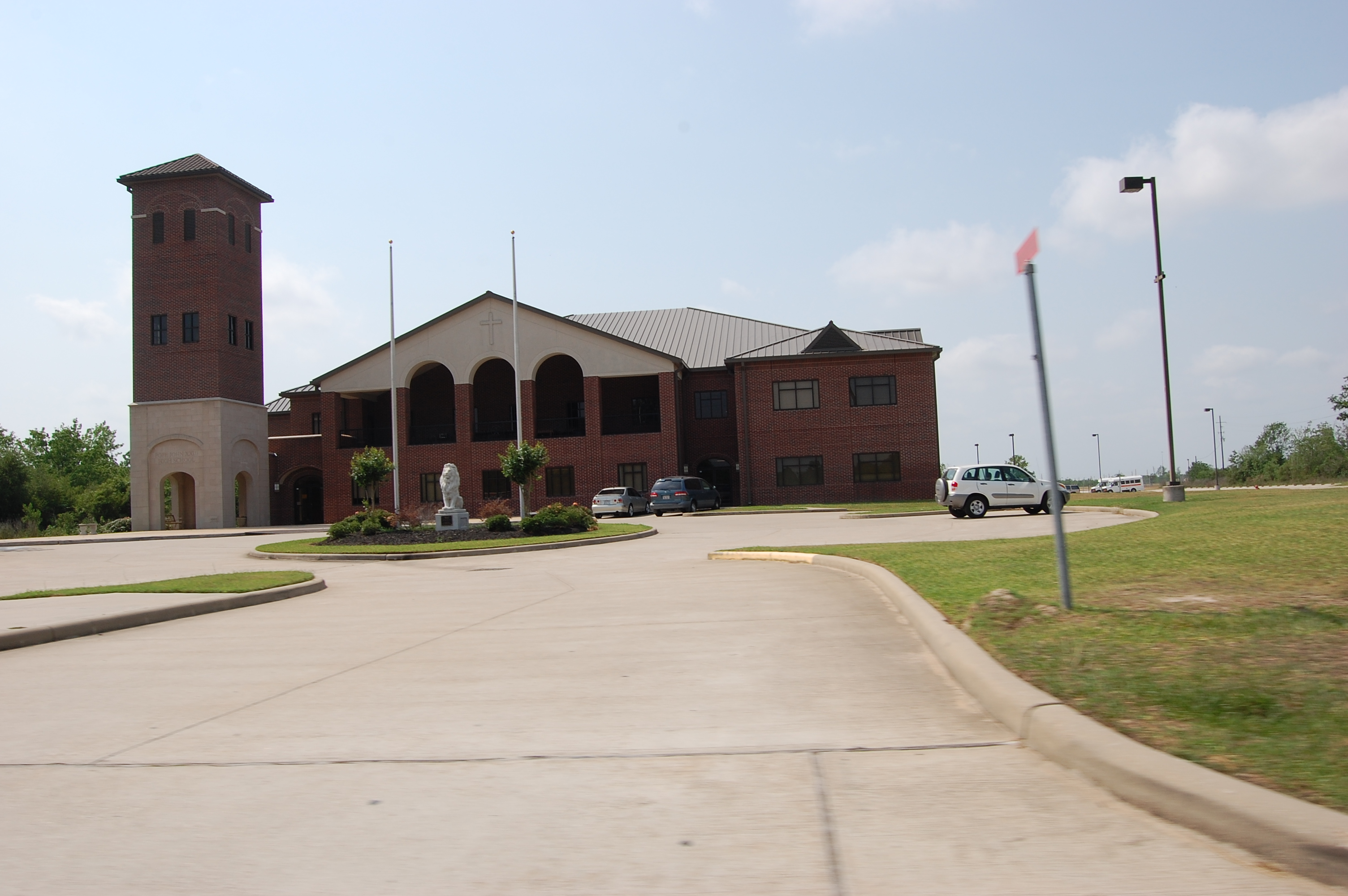

Location
- 1800 West Grand Parkway North; Unincorporated Harris County, Texas; Katy, (Harris County), Texas 77449; United States; 29°47′55″N 95°46′31″W

Information
- Type: Private, Coeducational
- Motto: Parare Mente et Corde (To Prepare in Mind and Heart)
- Religious affiliation: Roman Catholic
- Patron saint: Saint John XXIII
- Established: 2004
- Principal: Joseph Noonan
- Chaplain: Fr. Jonathan Mitchican
- Grades: 9–12
- Gender: Co-Ed
- Average class size: 27
- Student to teacher ratio: 23:1
- Campus size: 35-acre (140,000 m^{2})
- Colors: Crimson and gold
- Athletics: TAPPS 6A Division 1
- Mascot: Lion
- Accreditation: Southern Association of Colleges and Schools
- Dean of students: Matt Oelkers
- Dean of academics: Christine Langeland
- Athletic director: Billy Jackson
- Website: www.sj23lions.org

St. John XXIII College Preparatory, formerly Pope John XXIII High School, is a Catholic independent, non-profit, coeducational, private day school in unincorporated Harris County, Texas, United States, near Katy. The school serves grades 9–12. The academic year consists of two semesters, running from approximately August to December and from January to May. Student leadership development through the Works of Mercy program is a distinct characteristic of the school, and leadership principles are integrated into every course at St. John XXIII. SJ23 is accredited by and is a member of the Roman Catholic Archdiocese of Galveston-Houston (RCAGH), led by Archbishop Daniel Cardinal DiNardo. SJ23 is also the first new private day school to open in the Katy area in over fifty years, having opened in 2004. It is located at 1800 West Grand Parkway North.

The principal is Joseph Noonan.

== History ==
The Houston real estate company Westside Ventures Inc. donated the land used for the school, which first opened in the fall of 2004; the initial construction had a cost of $8 million and included classroom and athletic facilities. It was the first Catholic school to be built in Greater Houston since Strake Jesuit College Preparatory opened in the 1960s. Pope John XXIII initially had only the 9th grade, with 47 students enrolled in its first year of classes. As time passed, the school added more grade levels.

Circa October 2007 Lynn Veazey, who was serving as the principal, resigned. Don Lupton served as the interim principal until April 2008, when the school appointed the position to Tim Petersen, who previously served as the principal of Bishop Manogue Catholic High School in Reno, Nevada. At that time Lupton became the dean of students.

In 2008 the school had 165 students, and in the spring of that year the school held its first graduation. By April of that year the student count was 206. The student body increased to 270 for the 2009–2010 school year and then 314 for the 2010–2011 school year. The second phase was scheduled to start construction in early 2011, and in January 2012 the phase opened. The school had 400 students in the 2013–2014 school year. The school held its 10h anniversary celebration on October 11, 2013, and the canonization of Pope John XIII was expected the following year.

== Operations ==
Saint John XXIII serves the west side of the Houston area in the Greater Katy Area. Students from the Katy, Spring Branch, Cypress, Memorial, Rosenberg and Sugar Land areas attend the school. As of 2013 it also served the Spring area.

As of the 2013–2014 school year there were 10 students per teacher, and the average class size was 16. Upon admission, students are sorted into one of five houses, much like the Oxford colleges system. These houses are Aquinas, Borromeo, Lisieux, Loreto, and Neri, each named after an important saint of the Catholic church. Each house has its own form of internal student government, senior house captains, and has faculty and staff associates who work with the members of their house. Each house competes in Academic and Athletic competitions to earn points towards the Roncalli Cup as well as earning points from other ways such as coin drops at various sports events and competitions regarding charity donations such as who has donated the most items. The Roncalli Cup is named after the original last name of Pope John XXIII. As of 2021, each house except Borromeo has won the Roncalli Cup at least once. This house system is the first to be implemented in Catholic high schools in the state of Texas.

== Campus ==
Saint John XXIII High School is located on a 35-acre (140,000 m^{2}) parcel of land at the intersection of the Grand Parkway and Franz Road. Initially a smaller gymnasium with attached locker rooms served the school's athletic needs. The first phase included 19 classrooms, a cafeteria, and an office. The current gymnasium, built at a cost of $4 million, opened as part of the second phase of construction. It is on the eastern end of the campus. In addition to the new gymnasium, there was also a student center building that had a chapel, five classrooms, two laboratories, and a fitness center and attached locker room. The school is preparing to continue expansion after the newly constructed Crosthwait Student Center and a Competition Gymnasium nicknamed by the students the 'New Gym.'

== Academic performance ==
In 2012, the school was honored by the Cardinal Newman Society for Excellence in Catholic Identity as a part of the Catholic High Schools Honor Roll; it was one of only seven schools in the nation to receive such a distinction, and it was the only one in Greater Houston to do so.

== Athletics ==
The school's mascot, nicknamed PJ, is the lion. The school offers 15 different athletic teams, including football, volleyball, boys' and girls' basketball, baseball, softball, swimming, tennis, boys' and girls' soccer, cross country, track and field, golf, lacrosse (offered by an offcampus club) dance/drill team, and cheerleading. The women's swim team won the state title in TAPPS 4A in February 2012 and 2013. The girls' soccer team won the state title championship in TAPPS 3A in 2010. The TAPPS 4A Men's Cross Country champion has been from Pope John XXIII High School in the 2010-2011 and 2011-2012 school years. In 2013, the football team went to the TAPPS 4A State title game, and in 2014 the Boys' Golf team won their first state title. In 2018, the Girls' Softball team made it to the finals in TAPPS and ended the season in second place.

== Notable alumni ==
Gabe Klobosits, professional baseball player for the Washington Nationals

== See also ==
- Christianity in Houston
