= StoneGate Christian Academy =

Location
- 1705 Esters Rd. Irving, Dallas County, Texas 75061; United States; 32.802156°N 96.984317°W

Information
- Type: Private school
- Established: 1976
- Principal: Mr. Maples
- Faculty: 21
- Teaching staff: 18.8 (FTE)
- Grades: PreK–12
- Enrollment: 138 (2019–20)
- Student to teacher ratio: 6.9
- Colors: Navy Blue, Red, and White
- Athletics conference: TAPPS
- Team name: Lions
- Website: Official Website

StoneGate Christian Academy (SGCA) is a private Christian school educating students entering high school, elementary and pre-school. It opened as a ministry of the Shady Grove Church in 1976 and became an independent 503(c) organization in April 2005. They are located near Highways 183 and 161 in Irving, Texas.
