= The Highlands School =

Location
- 1451 East Northgate Drive; Irving, Texas 75062; United States; 32°50′53″N 96°55′45″W

Information
- Type: Private
- Motto: Semper Altius (Always Higher)
- Religious affiliation: Roman Catholic
- Established: 1986; 40 years ago
- Principal: Estela Zeik (Lower School and Middle School) and Elizabeth Beasley (High School)
- Executive director: Veronica Moreno
- Chaplain: Fr. Jared LC
- Faculty: 72
- Grades: PK–12
- Gender: Co-educational
- Enrollment: 405 (2025)
- Campus size: 35 acres (140,000 m^{2})
- Colors: Red and Navy Blue
- Athletics conference: TAPPS AAA-IV
- Team name: Blazers
- Accreditation: Southern Association of Colleges and Schools
- Tuition: 14000
- Affiliation: Legion of Christ
- Website: www.thehighlandsschool.org

The Highlands School is a private, PK–12 Catholic college preparatory school in Irving, Texas, United States. It was established in 1986, in the front room of a family's house in Highland Park, Dallas. The last twenty years, The Highlands School changed location twice. The school itself has seen many upgrades from the addition of a football field and lights to a gymnasium, weight room, and new technology in the classrooms. The Highlands School is fully accredited by the Texas Catholic Conference Education Department (TCCED) since 1999, and by the Southern Association of Colleges and Schools (SACS) since 2006. For the fourth consecutive year, the school has been named by the Acton Institute as one of the "Top 50 Catholic Schools" in the country. In 2012, it was also named a top 50 Catholic High School by the Cardinal Newman Society.
