= Incarnate Word Academy (Houston) =

Private, all-girls school in Texas, U.S.

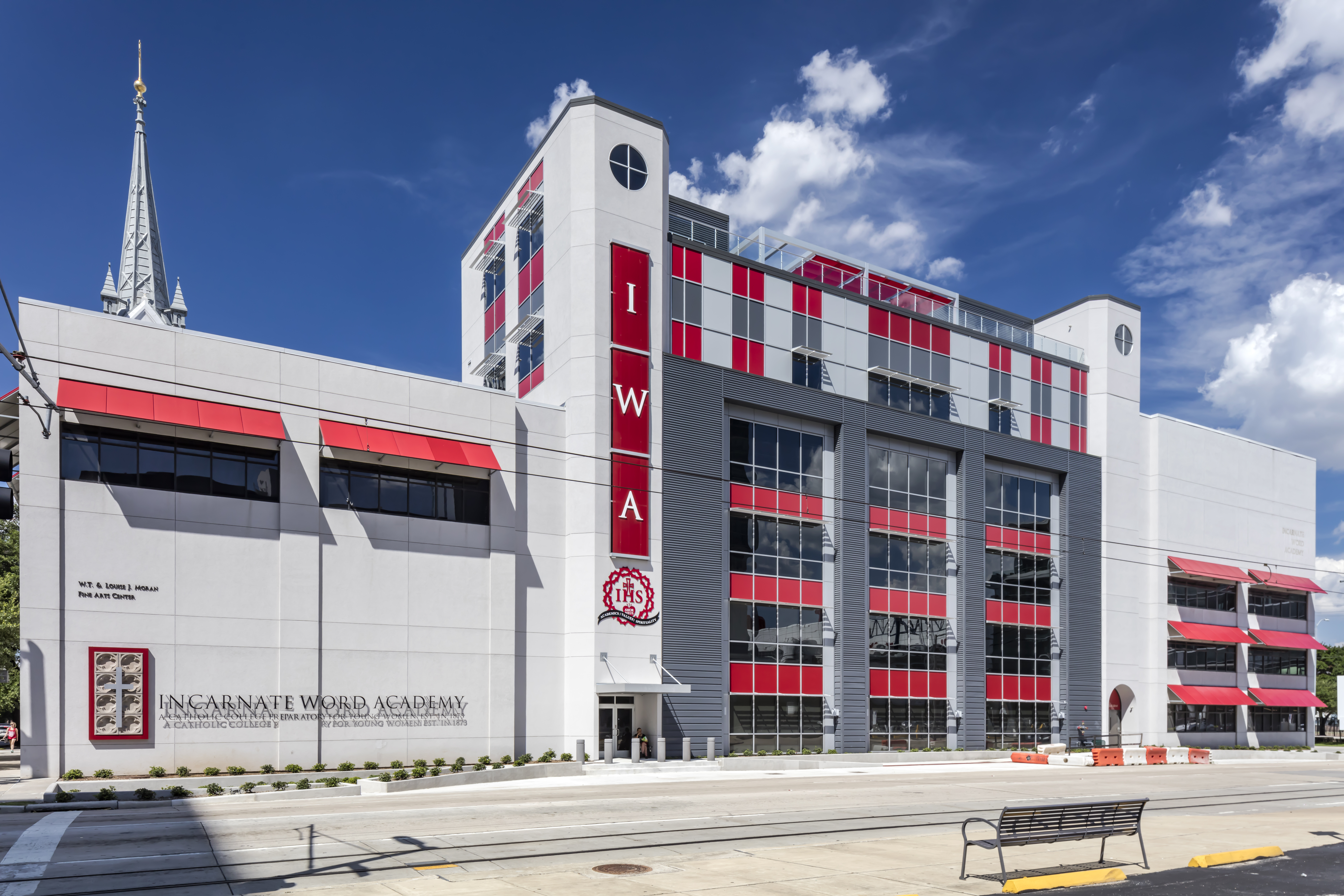

Location
- 609 Crawford Street; Houston, Texas, (Harris County) 77002; United States; 29°45′23″N 95°21′26″W

Information
- Type: Private, all-girls
- Motto: Praised be the Incarnate Word
- Religious affiliation: Roman Catholic
- Denomination: Catholicism
- Established: 1873
- Founder: Mother Jeanne de Matel
- Status: Open
- School code: 443330
- President: Sister Lauren Beck, C.V.I.
- Principal: Christina Gensheimer
- Head teacher: Mr. Comer
- Faculty: 39
- Grades: 9–12
- Gender: All girls
- Age range: 14-18
- Enrollment: 250
- Average class size: 16
- Student to teacher ratio: 9:1
- Language: English
- Colors: Red and white
- Fight song: We hail the Alma mater, we offer thee our song, incarnate word our beacon can we be ought but strong. With red and white our colors, the acorn emblem true, IWA we pledge today fidelity to you.
- Athletics conference: TAPPS 5A
- Mascot: Falcons
- Team name: Falcons
- Accreditation: Southern Association of Colleges and Schools
- USNWR ranking: 827
- National ranking: 1.5
- Publication: The Word Magazine
- Yearbook: The Margil
- Tuition: $19,825
- Website: www.incarnateword.org

Incarnate Word Academy is an all-girls Roman Catholic college preparatory school located in Downtown Houston, Texas, United States.

Incarnate Word Academy serves grades 9 through 12 and is owned and operated by the Congregation of the Incarnate Word and Blessed Sacrament. IWA opened a new $15 million, 18,500 square feet (1,720 m^{2}) academic building in the Spring of 2017 to provide additional space for classes, collaboration, student life, and fine arts.

== Student body ==
The student body represents fifty-one Catholic parishes and 101 zip codes across the Houston metropolitan area and is a community of 348 young women. As of the 2017–2018 school year, school's racial percentages are as follows:

- Hispanic: 24%
- White American: 48%
- African-American: 9%
- Multi-racial: 11%
- Asian/Pacific Islander: 8%

== History ==
In 1873, three nuns from the religious order of the Sisters of the Incarnate Word and Blessed Sacrament (founded by Mother Jeanne de Matel) arrived at the corner of Jackson and Crawford with a historic mission in mind. The sisters were invited by Bishop Jean Odin to establish a school for young women.

The sisters arrived in Houston from Lyon, France by way of Brownsville, Texas on April 25, 1873. They took up their residence in a large building, once a Franciscan Monastery, across the street from St. Vincent's Church on Franklin Street. A chapel was prepared and on May 5, 1873, Mass was celebrated there. The student body marks this day each on Foundation Day.

These women of early Texas founded the first permanent school in Houston, and called it Incarnate Word Academy for Young Ladies.

== Curriculum ==
The curriculum is primarily intended to prepare students for higher education and to this end students take core, college-preparatory courses and electives based on their individual interests.

=== Advanced Placement program ===
The school has an Advanced Placement (AP) program with honors and AP classes, wherein students take classes that closely parallel university-level courses in the same subject. These classes follow a strict syllabus and are graded more rigorously than non-AP courses. They culminate in a standardized, comprehensive exam each spring, a passing score on which may earn the student college credit.

== See also ==
- Christianity in Houston
