= Josef Centeno =

American chef, restaurateur, and cookbook author

- Born: San Antonio, Texas
- Education: San Antonio Academy; Central Catholic Marianist High School; Culinary Institute of America
- Culinary career
- Current restaurant(s): Bar Amá, Bäco Mercat, Orsa & Winston

Josef Centeno is an American chef, restaurateur and cookbook author who specializes in Tex-Mex cuisine. He was nominated for a James Beard award for Best Chef in February 2020.

== Early life and education ==
Centeno grew up in a Mexican American family in San Antonio, Texas. He grew up eating his grandmother's Tex-Mex cooking, which he described as, "all from scratch and very simple—it’s what you would call farm-to-table, because they had a little garden and a little produce stand." Centeno's father worked as a butcher in the family grocery store and his great-grandfather, Joe Centeno Sr., founded Centeno Supermarkets, the first chain of independent Latino groceries in the US.

Centeno graduated from San Antonio Academy, Central Catholic Marianist High School and the Culinary Institute of America.

== Career ==
In 2011, Centeno opened Bäco Mercat, a Spanish-inspired restaurant located in Los Angeles.

Bar Amá was named for his maternal grandmother, who came from a family of refugees who left Northern Mexico during the Mexican Revolution. They came to Texas and Centeno said they cooked Tex-Mex food. Centeno described his grandmother's food as "Simple cooking that wasn’t authentically Mexican but not the melted-cheese-topped stuff people usually talk about when describing Tex-Mex." In June 2019 his restaurant Orsa & Winston, a Japanese- and Italian-inspired restaurant, earned a Michelin star. In July 2019 he opened Amácita in Culver City.

During the 2020 coronavirus pandemic Centeno was one of the first chefs to shut down his restaurants entirely, telling his employees told "to file for unemployment [right then], because by [the following] week, it was going to be a shitshow.” Orsa & Winston and Bar Ama have both reopened after the coronavirus lockdowns.

=== Cookbooks ===
Centeno's first cookbook, Baco: Vivid Recipes from the Heart of Los Angeles (2017), co-written with his life partner and former LA Times food editor Betty Hallock, focussed on the cuisine of Los Angeles. Food & Wine said it was "about being an Angeleno and an American who breaks boundaries and celebrates multicultural flavors." LAist named it to their list of "essential cookbooks for the modern Angeleno."

Centeno's second cookbook Amá: a modern Tex-Mex kitchen ( 2019), also co-written with Hallock, was published by Chronicle Books. The New Yorker named it one of the best books of the year and Eater one of the best cookbooks of fall of 2019.

== Philosophy ==
Centeno, who says he "grew up during the commercialization of Tex-Mex", originally avoided cooking Tex-Mex and instead, "ran as far away from San Antonio as I could. I moved to New York and got into French cooking." According to the Wall Street Journal, Centeno sees Tex-Mex as "not a cuisine based on processed cheese. It is rather a genre of cooking developed by necessity, by people uprooted from where they came from, who happened to arrive in Texas."

== Honors ==
In February 2020 Centeno was named a semifinalist for Best Chef by the James Beard Foundation. The Los Angeles Times named Orsa & Winston their restaurant of the year in July 2021, citing Centeno's response to the coronavirus pandemic as part of their decision. He holds a Michelin star for Orsa & Winston.

== Reception ==
The Wall Street Journal called his restaurants Bar Amá and Amácita "the country’s most thoughtful Tex-Mex." The New York Times named Amacita's hamachi collar one of the ten best Los Angeles dishes of 2019. Bloomberg named Bar Ama's queso one of the best in the world.
