= Vanguard College Preparatory School =

Location
- 2517 Mt. Carmel; Waco, Texas 76710; United States; 31.542984°N 97.207919°W

Information
- Type: Private secondary
- Established: 1973
- NCES School ID: 01328528
- Headmaster: Zach Seifert
- Teaching staff: 21.1
- Grades: 6-12
- Enrollment: 300 (2016)
- Average class size: 3–20
- Student to teacher ratio: 1:9
- Campus: 8.5 acres (3.4 ha)
- Colors: Blue, Green, and White
- Mascot: Viking
- Accreditation: Southern Association of Colleges and Schools
- Website: www.vanguard.org

Vanguard College Preparatory School, founded in 1973, is a private, independent, coeducational, college preparatory day school located in Waco, Texas, United States, for students in grades 7-12. Enrollment, as of the 2022-2023 academic year is 268, with 41 on the teaching faculty.

The campus consists of 8.5 acres (3.4 ha) and the school is housed in several buildings. Vanguard is a college style campus. A science and math building was completed in 1984, two gymnasiums were completed in 1980 and enlarged as a multi-purpose facility in 1992, and a performing arts center was completed in 1987. A new classroom building opened for use in the fall of 2000 and a new visual arts building and video studio opened in 2004. Administrative offices were renovated in 2005 and the gymnasium complex was renovated in 2006. State of the art computer labs are accessible to students, and the entire campus has Wi-Fi. Art, drama, music, publications, service organizations, debate, Knowledge Master, Mock Trial and athletics are among their extracurricular options. The 2014 and 2016 editions of Liquid Paper, Vanguard's literary magazine, received a superior rating from the National Council of Teachers of English. The 2011 edition, Circadian, received first place from the American Scholastic Press Association.

== Athletics ==
Vanguard has won over forty-four team state titles.

Students can play multiple sports.

- The Varsity Golf team won 12 consecutive state championships from 2005-2016
- Vanguard's biggest rivals include cross-town rivals Live Oak Classical, and Reicher Catholic.
- Varsity Teams - Football, Basketball, Baseball, Softball, Soccer, Golf, Volleyball, Tennis, Track, Cross Country, Cheerleading. Vanguard is 4A in TAPPS.
- Vanguard has fostered Division 1 Athletes in Basketball, Golf, Volleyball, Tennis, and Softball.

== National Merit Commended Scholars and Semifinalist ==
Vanguard has had over 41 National Merit Finalist in the past 17 years

== Accreditation ==
Southern Association of Colleges and Schools, and approved by the Texas Education Agency.

== Memberships ==
- National Association of Independent Schools
- Southern Association of Independent Schools
- Texas Association of Private and Parochial Schools
- Texas Association of Non-Public Schools
- The College Board
- National Association of Secondary School Principals
- National Association of College Admission Counseling
- Texas Association of College Admission Counseling
- Texas Association of Supervision and Curriculum Development
- Texas Counseling Association

== Notable alumni ==
- Pat Green - Country musician
