= Alcuin School =

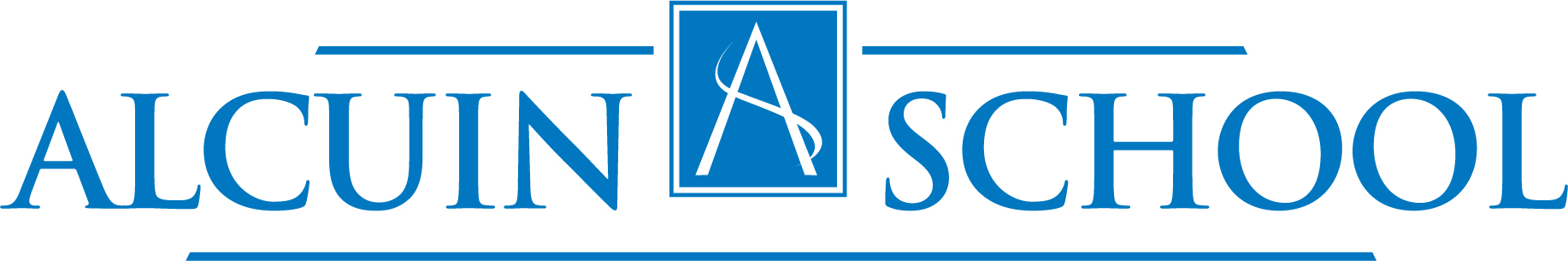

Location
- 6144 Churchill Way; Dallas, Texas 75230; United States; 32°55′00″N 96°48′01″W

Information
- Type: Private, day, college-prep
- Motto: Innovative Thinkers. Passionate Learners.
- Established: 1964
- Head of school: Dr. Paola V. Clark
- Faculty: 140
- Grades: Pre K–12
- Enrollment: 630
- Campus: 12 acres (4.9 ha)
- Athletics conference: Texas Association of Private and Parochial Schools (TAPPS) Texas Association of Private Schools (TAPS) Metro Athletic League (MAL)
- Mascot: Hawk
- Tuition: $22,268-$42,148
- Website: www.alcuinschool.org

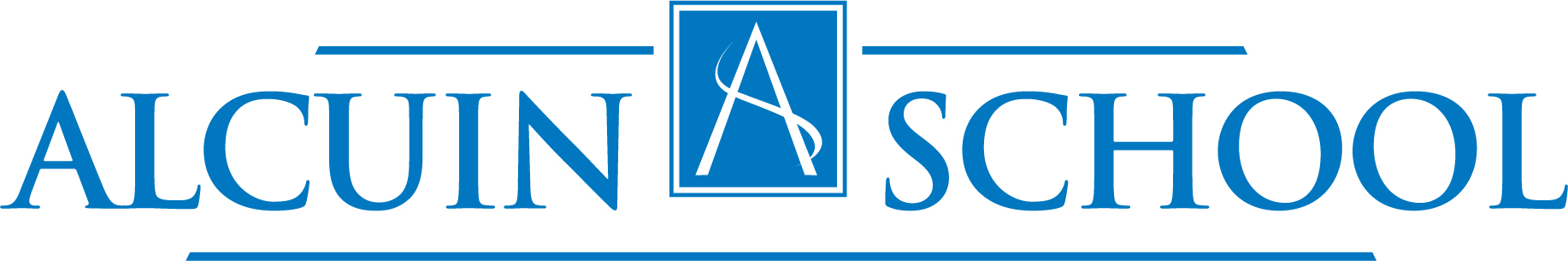

Alcuin School is an independent, non-sectarian, co-educational day school in Dallas, Texas. With Montessori and International Baccalaureate programs, it serves students from 18-months-old through the 12th grade. Alcuin is accredited by the Independent Schools Association of the Southwest, recognized by the Association Montessori Internationale, and is an IB World School.

== History ==
In 1964, Episcopal priest Albert A. Taliaferro founded the non-sectarian Montessori School of Dallas. In subsequent years the school’s name would change to Montessori Academy, St. Alcuin Montessori School, and then Alcuin School. Though a handful of Montessori schools had opened in the United States in the wake of early publicity of Maria Montessori’s educational methods in the 1910s, the movement soon fizzled, and by 1920 there were virtually no Montessori schools left in the country. Alcuin’s predecessor school was opened during a second wave of enthusiasm for Montessori education in the U.S., which hit in the early 1960s, spurred by the advocacy of Nancy McCormick Rambusch, an American educator who received her Montessori training in London.

Originally occupying part of a two-story house in the Highland Park neighborhood, the Montessori School of Dallas served 68 students between the ages of two and five. After its first year, the school purchased two acres in what was then far North Dallas on Noel Road at Montford, where it was located for nearly twenty years.

In 2013, Alcuin School decided to open an Upper School.

The decision to open an Upper School required expansion and renovation of the campus and its facilities, which initially raised concerns among some of the school’s residential neighbors. The concerns were resolved, and in 2015, Alcuin School’s zoning request to allow expansion and renovations was approved by the Dallas City Council.

== Athletics and extra-curricular activities ==
Beginning in 5th grade, Alcuin School teams compete in the Metro Athletic League, shifting in 7th and 8th grades to the Texas Association of Private Schools league, and on to the Texas Association of Private and Parochial Schools in grades 9 through 12.
