= Glenn Creamer =

Glenn M. Creamer
- Born: Rhode Island
- Education: Brown University, BA, Economics; Harvard Business School, MBA
- Occupation(s): Private Equity Investor; co-founder & Senior Managing Director Emeritus of Providence Equity Partners

Glenn Creamer is a senior advisor and Senior Managing Director Emeritus of Providence Equity Partners, a global private equity firm based in Providence, Rhode Island, with US$32 billion in managed funds.

== Early life and education ==
Creamer grew up in Rhode Island. He graduated from Brown University in 1984 with a Bachelor of Arts in Economics and International Relations. Creamer graduated Harvard Business School in 1988 with a Master of Business Administration.

== Career ==
Creamer worked in investment banking at Merrill Lynch and later at J.P. Morgan & Co. Upon graduating HBS, Creamer joined Narragansett Capital, a private equity firm based in Providence, Rhode Island.

Subsequently, Creamer helped found Providence Equity Partners, a global industry-focused private equity firms.

== Philanthropy ==
Creamer serves as chairman of the Catholic Relief Services Foundation, which raises funds to support the work of Catholic Relief Services. CRS works in over 100 countries.

Creamer is chairman of the World Affairs Councils of America, based in Washington D.C. WACA is the nation's largest nonpartisan grassroots organization dedicated to engaging the American public in foreign affairs.

Creamer is president of the Thomas Becket Foundation at Brown University. He also serves on the boards of the Rhode Island School of Design Museum, the Norton Museum of Art, Mustard Seed Communities, and the American Friends of Jamaica. Additionally, he is a member of the Board of Dean's Advisors at the Harvard Business School and a member of the Council on Foreign Relations.
