= Covenant Christian School (Conroe, Texas) =

Location
- 4503 IH-45 North; Conroe, Texas 77304; United States; 30.375461°N 95.488123°W

Information
- Type: Private
- Established: 1982
- Head Administrator: Dr. Glenn Slater
- Grades: P–12
- Campus: Suburban
- Athletics: Male and Female Varsity, Junior Varsity
- Athletics conference: Texas Association of Private and Parochial Schools
- Mascot: Cougar
- Website: Official Website

Covenant Christian School is a private Christian school in Conroe, Texas, United States.

CCS was formed in 1982 under the original name of Conroe Bible Christian School. The name was changed to Covenant Christian School in 1983 in an effort to appeal to a broader segment of the Christian community. For the first eighteen years, the school functioned as a ministry of Conroe Bible Church and used the CBC facilities as its campus. The school has always been governed by an independent Board of Trustees, composed of parents of students at Covenant. The student body is made up of families from Montgomery, Walker, San Jacinto, and Liberty counties. Covenant families currently represent approximately twelve denominations and more than fifty local churches.
