= Brighter Horizons Academy =

Brighter Horizons Academy – College Preparatory
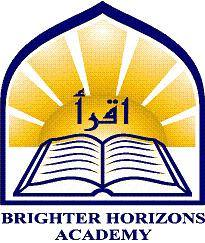

Location
- 3145 Medical Plaza Dr, Garland, Texas 75044; United States
- 32.9467°N 96.6697°W

Information
- Type: Private
- Motto: Where knowledge, faith, academics, and character meet
- Established: 1989
- Founder: Islamic Services Foundation
- NCES School ID: A0109332
- Principal: Jehad Matariyeh
- Faculty: 70
- Grades: PreK–12
- Gender: co-ed
- Enrollment: 828
- Campus: 14 acres (0.057 km^{2})
- Colors: Blue and Yellow
- Mascot: Star ("Home of the Stars")
- Website: www.bhaprep.org

Brighter Horizons Academy (BHA) is an Islamic pre-K–12 college preparatory school located in Garland, Texas. Founded in 1989, BHA was accredited in 2006. It is one of the first Islamic schools to offer a dual-credit program, yet few take part, in conjunction with the Dallas County Community College District, which allows students to graduate high school with an associate's degree.

== History ==
=== Foundation ===
The School was founded in 1989 by Islamic Services Foundation. The first building was a 2,000 sq.ft. residential property purchased in 1990, located on Polk street.

The current campus property was purchased in 1993. Phase I of the two-story main building was completed in 1999, consisting of a 28,000 sq ft building and playground. In 2003 an adjacent medical office building was purchased to be used for the Early Childhood Education building.

BHA received accreditation from Southern Association of Colleges and Schools (SACS) CASI in 2006. SACS CASI uses five standards when accrediting a school, which are purpose and direction, governance and leadership (quite a controversial position to hold at BHA), teaching and assessing for learning, resources and support systems, and using results for continuous improvement.

== Student life ==
=== School uniform ===
The school colors are blue and gold, and the school uniform consists of a combination of light blue or grey tops, and grey or navy slacks, All clothing adheres to Islamic standards of dress. Girls are required to wear a headscarf beginning in the 5th grade.

=== Logo and mascot ===
The school logo is an open Qur'an with the word Iqra (إقرا, "Read"). The mascot is a star.

=== Clubs and organizations ===
BHA competes in Private Schools Interscholastic Association competitions each year.

== Academics ==
BHA has a dual-credit program with Richland College. Juniors and Seniors may take college courses at the BHA campus.

There are 100 full-time teachers and staff. The school has introduced a laptop program in which all students enrolled in 11th grade receive a laptop.

In addition to academics, BHA offers an Islamic Studies and Hifz program. The Hifz program is offered both full-time and after school and is separate from the Islamic Studies courses offered as standard curriculum.
