= San Antonio Academy =

San Antonio Academy of Texas

Location
- 117 E. French Place; San Antonio, Texas 78212; United States; 29.4508°N 98.4924°W

Information
- Type: Private
- Motto: Be honest. Be kind. Be the best you can be.®
- Established: 1886
- Head of school: Paul Quick
- Faculty: 41
- Enrollment: 333 students
- Average class size: 15 students
- Student to teacher ratio: 8:1
- Colors: Blue and white
- Athletics: Soccer, baseball, basketball, lacrosse, tennis, football, cross-country, golf, track & field
- Mascot: Wildcat
- Website: www.sa-academy.org

The San Antonio Academy is a private school for boys located in San Antonio, Texas. The school is accredited by the Independent Schools Association of the Southwest. The school was founded in 1886 and has since then moved locations several times. San Antonio Academy has about 40 students per grade, and 20 students per class. Academy boys also shine in athletics and in fine arts. Through the respected military program in grades 3‐8, boys acquire leadership skills and develop the "esprit de corps" that comes from working together to achieve common goals. The school also offers grades pre-kindergarten to 2nd, with a strong emphases on the "bond of brothers" between younger and older children.

Notable alumni include Josef Centeno, Tex Hill and David Scott.
