= Covenant Christian School (Panama City, Florida) =

School in Panama City, Florida, United States

- Testaméntum Christianae Sectae

Location
- 2350 Frankford Avenue; Panama City, (Bay County), Florida 32405; United States; 30.191868°N 85.691596°W

Information
- School type: Private 501(c)(3), combined elementary, middle and high school
- Motto: "Dues Nobiscum, Quis Contra" - If God is with us, who can be against us? "Soli Deo Gloria" - Glory to God alone
- Denomination: Presbyterian Church in America
- Established: 1982
- Status: Open
- Authority: Covenant Presbyterian Church (same location)
- CEEB code: 101347
- NCES School ID: 02016369
- Principal: Michael Sabo
- Faculty: 20.3 (on an FTE basis)
- Grades: PK–12
- Years offered: 1983-Present
- Gender: Coeducational
- Age: 3+
- Enrollment: 254 (2009-2010 school year)
- Student to teacher ratio: 12.5
- Education system: Classical Christian
- Schedule type: Mixed/Custom
- Colors: Blue and White
- Song: By Faith
- Nickname: CCS
- Team name: Covenant Lions
- Accreditation: Association of Classical Christian Schools. Member of and seeking accreditation from Christian Schools of Florida
- Yearbook: Angelia
- Website: www.ccs-pc.net

Covenant Christian School is a private Christian school located in Panama City, Florida. The school educates students in Pre-K (age 3) to 12th grade. The school is a ministry of Covenant Presbyterian Church of Panama City. It was founded in 1982 and had its first graduating class in 1989. The current school headmaster is Michael Sabo. It is accredited by the Association of Classical Christian Schools.

== Education ==
=== Curriculum ===
The school started using the Classical Curriculum at the start of the school year in 2009, as the only school in the Bay County Area to do so. The school is divided into the Beginning Grammar, Grammar, Logic, and Rhetoric classes instead of the usual pre-K, elementary, middle, and high school classes. Covenant's main language course is Latin.

=== High school ===
Starting with the school year in 2013, Covenant Christian School is the only private high school in Bay County that offers non-virtual high school.

== Facility ==
The campus of Covenant Christian School includes 22 classrooms, 1 meeting and rhetoric room, 2 locker rooms, 1 art studio, 1 science lab, 1 gymnasium, 3 outdoor playgrounds, 1 practice soccer field, 1 sanctuary, 1 fellowship hall, 2 modular (old robotics) rooms, 3 lunch grounds, 2 basketball courts, and 6 bathroom locations.

=== Gymnasium ===
Dubbed The Lions Den by students and faculty of Covenant Christian School, their gymnasium features 2 built-in basketball goals, 1 outdoor basketball goal, and hosts all of the school's home basketball and volleyball games. A center platform is present on the opposite side of the entrance for scorekeepers, performers, and MCs. There is also a classroom and a youth room upstairs.

== Extracurricular activities ==
Covenant Christian School offers a wide variety of extracurricular activities, ranging from robotics to martial arts. Below is a list of a few extracurricular activities:

- Robotics Club (With the FIRST Lego League Challenge)
- Strategy Club
- Extreme Sports (Soccer, Basketball, Flag Football)
- Before and After care
- Gymnastics
- Piano, Voice
- Yearbook
- Jr Beta Club

=== Robotics club ===
Covenant has a prestigious robotics club in the FIRST Lego League Challenge, with teams that have advanced to the state competition all the years that they have competed. Due to the size of the club, Covenant competes with four teams: The Knights, The Vikings, The Crusaders, and the Spartans. Many regional competitions are hosted at the school, with students coming from all over the Florida Panhandle to compete. However as of 2023 there is no longer a Robotics Club.

=== Sports ===
Covenant is a participant in the Bay County Private Schools' "Extreme Sports" Program where kids from 1st through 5th grade participate in basketball, soccer, and flag football. High school students participate in the FHSAA sports league as a member of a public school team.
