= Providence High School (San Antonio) =

Providence Catholic School
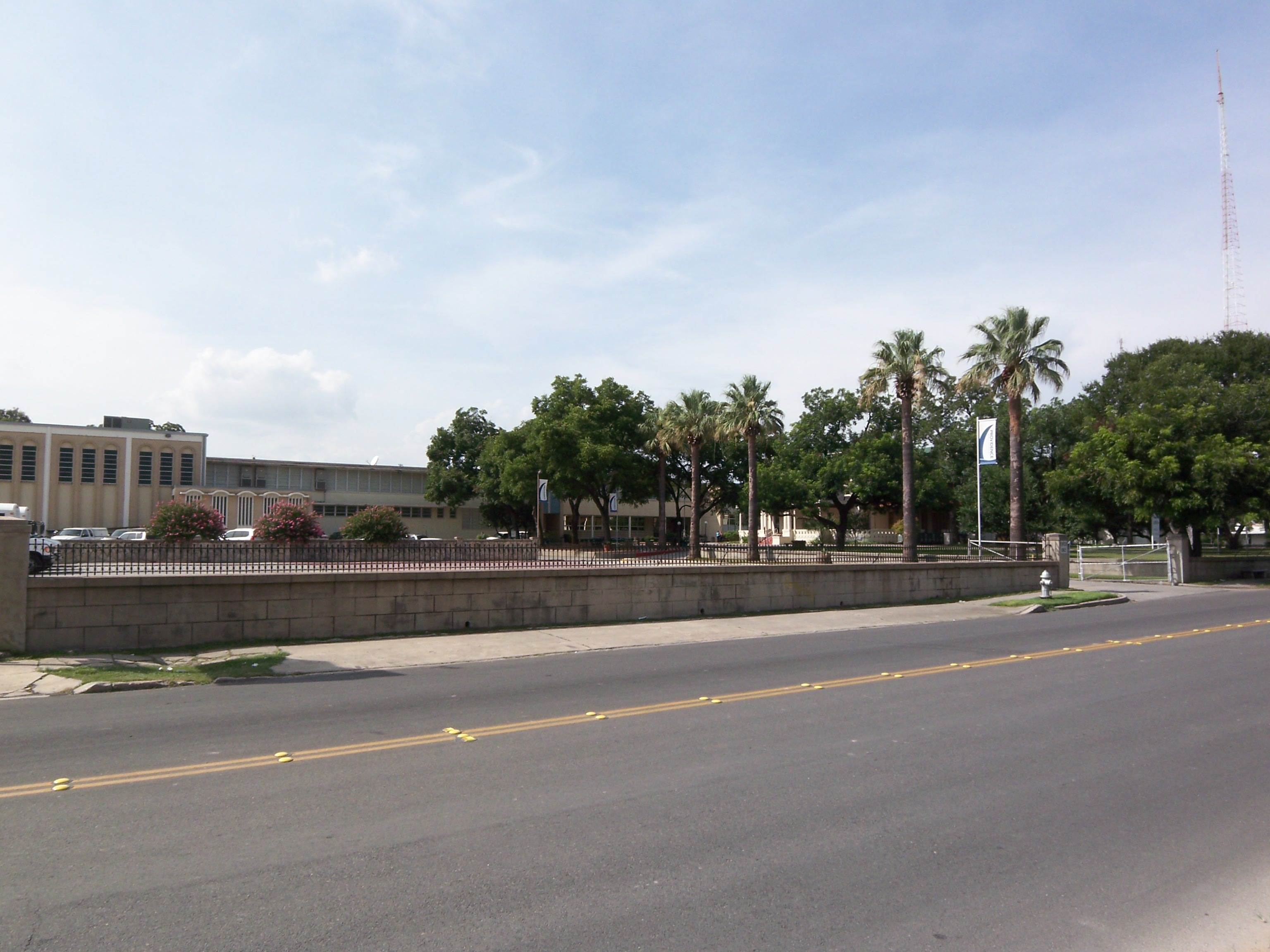

Location
- 1215 North St. Mary's Street; San Antonio, (Bexar County), Texas 78215; United States
- Coordinates: 29°26′6″N 98°29′11″W

Information
- Type: Private
- Religious affiliation: Roman Catholic
- Established: 1951
- Founder: Sisters of Divine Providence
- Principal: Elise Denoux
- Grades: 6–12
- Gender: Girls
- Enrollment: approx. 250 (2020-2021)
- Student to teacher ratio: 10:1
- Colors: Navy Blue and White
- Athletics conference: TAPPS 5A
- Team name: Provets
- Rival: Incarnate Word, Holy Cross
- Accreditation: Southern Association of Colleges and Schools
- Newspaper: The Provue
- Annual tuition: $6,835 - $10,395
- Athletic Director: Toni Gorman
- Website: providencecatholicschool.net

Providence Catholic School is a Catholic, college preparatory school for girls in Downtown San Antonio, Texas, USA. It is accredited by the Texas Catholic Conference Education Department and the Southern Association of Colleges and Schools and is a member of The College Board. It is a member of the Roman Catholic Archdiocese of San Antonio.

== History ==
The Congregation of Divine Providence (CDP), who had founded Our Lady of the Lake College (now University), established Providence High School as a girls' high school on September 4, 1951, with a broad selection of courses taught by 22 sisters. In 1993, Providence High School was incorporated, and established a decision-making board of directors that includes CDP sisters and civic leaders, educators and others.

In fall of 2005, Providence added a Middle School for girls grades 6-8. It was renamed in 2008 to Providence Catholic School.

== Athletics ==
Students elect to participate in various competitive athletic activities, from basketball to cross country to track & field and volleyball. Two of the more recent sports additions are tennis and swimming.

== Faculty and staff ==
Providence hosts a faculty of 43, including members of the CDP and lay teachers.
