= New Braunfels Christian Academy =

Location
- 220 FM 1863; New Braunfels, Texas 78132; United States; 29.718959°N 98.183045°W

Information
- Type: Independent, Private, Christian
- Motto: Christian Leaders Learn Here
- Established: 1981
- Head teacher: Nick Reeves
- Enrollment: 577 day
- Campus size: 40 acres (0 km^{2})
- Campus type: Suburban
- Colors: Black, Hunter green and white
- Athletics: 17 sports
- Mascot: Whiskers the Wildcat
- Website: www.nbcatx.org

New Braunfels Christian Academy (NBCA) is a private preschool - 12th grade Christian school located in New Braunfels, Texas in the United States. NBCA is an independent, non-denominational school founded in 1981. NBCA receives day students from preschool to grade 12. The school is located in New Braunfels, Texas, south of Austin, and north of San Antonio.

NBCA is a member of the Texas Association of Private Schools, and the Texas Association of Private and Parochial Schools. It is accredited by the Association of Christian Schools International, and the Southern Association of Colleges and Schools.

== School mascot and colors ==
The official mascot of New Braunfels Christian Academy is the Wildcat. The boys' sports teams are referred to as the "Wildcats" and the girls' teams as "Lady Cats". The school colors are hunter green and black.

== Fine arts ==
Concert choir performing at Academy Christmas concert.

The NBCA Fine Arts Department for the secondary campus has been ranked first in the State of Texas for its division, TAPPS 2A. The band and choir compete at the district and state levels in concert, solo and ensemble TAPPS competitions. The student musical groups also perform at parades, local events and charity functions.

The elementary school offers students the opportunity to participate in music and art classes. The secondary school offers students the opportunity to participate in middle and high school choir and band. The secondary school also produces a large scale musical once a year which in the past has included Little Women, The Sound of Music, Oklahoma!, Hello, Dolly!, Li'l Abner, Cinderella, Bye Bye Birdie, The Music Man, Annie Get Your Gun, Oliver!, Seven Brides for Seven Brothers, Wizard of Oz, Beauty and the Beast, and Singin' in the Rain.

== Athletics ==
The Athletics Department at NBCA offers courses in health education, physical education, wellness, strength and conditioning, soccer, and athletic training. The Secondary school fields teams in 17 sports over three seasons during the school year. Consistently, more than 80% of the students participate in at least one sport. As a competitive member of the Texas Association of Private and Parochial Schools, the Academy has regularly fielded talented teams.

== Activities ==
There is a weekly chapel service every Wednesday at both campuses. The secondary campus has its own praise and worship team that leads students in worship at the beginning of every chapel service. The secondary campus has organizations such as Business Professionals of America, Distinguished Honors Organization, National Honors Society, National Junior Honors Society, and Student Government.
