= Legacy Christian Academy (Frisco, Texas) =

Private Christian School in Frisco, Texas

Location
- 5000 Academy Drive; Frisco, (Collin County), Texas 75034; United States; 33.128682°N 96.845856°W

Information
- School type: Private, elementary, middle, and college-preparatory school
- Religious affiliation: Christian
- Denomination: Non-denominational
- Established: 1998; 28 years ago
- Founder: Jody Capehart
- Chairman: Robert Copple
- Head of school: Kevin Mosley
- Faculty: 120
- Grades: Pre-K4–12
- Gender: Co-educational
- Colors: Green and Gold
- Athletics conference: TAPPS 5A
- Mascot: Eli (Costumed)
- Team name: Eagles
- Accreditation: ACSI and SACS
- Website: Official website

Legacy Christian Academy is a private, non-denominational Christian school serving grades Pre-K through 12 in Frisco, Texas. serving students from Pre-K through 12th grade. Established in 1998, the school is accredited by the Association of Christian Schools International (ACSI) and the Southern Association of Colleges and Schools (SACS). The institution's upper school was designated a National Blue Ribbon School in 2017. Academically, the school maintains partnerships for dual-credit courses and competes in the TAPPS 5A athletic conference.

== Academics ==
The curriculum includes Advanced Placement (AP) and dual credit courses throug John Brown University and LeTourneau University.

AP courses include: calculus, physics, chemistry, biology, Spanish, Latin, studio art, and computer science. Dual credit courses include: college algebra, survey of calculus, English (composition and literary analysis & research), U.S. history, and computer science.

== Athletics ==
Legacy Christian Academy is part of the TAPPS 5A grouping. Athletic teams compete as the Eagles.

The school sponsors various sports, including football, basketball, soccer, and track for both (boys & girls).

== Awards ==
Legacy's upper school (grades 9–12) was named a national blue ribbon school in 2017.
