= Covenant Christian Academy (Colleyville, Texas) =

Location
- 901 Cheek-Sparger Road; Colleyville, Texas 76034; United States; 32.867848°N 97.155227°W

Information
- Type: Christian, Classical, College Preparatory School
- Religious affiliation: Christian
- Established: 1979
- Head of School: Dr. Rebecca Thomas
- Color
- Athletics: Football, basketball, soccer, volleyball, track, cross country, golf, tennis, swimming, cheerleading
- Athletics conference: TAPPS AAA
- Mascot: Cougars
- Website: Official Website

Covenant Christian Academy of Colleyville, Texas, is a private Christian school that was founded in 1979. It is an accredited ACCS school and a member of the Texas Association of Private and Parochial Schools. Covenant Christian Academy is a non-denominational, classical, college preparatory Christian school serving students age 3 through grade 12. Pre-AP, AP, and Dual-Credit available.

== History ==
The school was established by Colleyville Presbyterian Church in 1980 with six kindergarten pupils.

The classical approach to teaching was added to the college preparatory standards in 1998.

The school was accredited by the Association of Classical and Christian Schools in 2016.
