= Covenant Christian School (Canberra) =

Coordinates: 35.44012°S 149.0902°E

- Canberra, Australian Capital Territory; Australia

Information
- Type: Independent, co-educational, Christian, day
- Motto: For Christ's Crown and Covenant
- Established: 1991
- Principal: Martin Keast
- Staff: 50
- Grades: Preschool – Year 10
- Enrolment: 283
- Colours: Royal blue and gold
- Website: http://www.covenant.act.edu.au

Covenant Christian School, formerly known as Covenant College, is an independent Christian primary and high school located on Woodcock Drive, Gordon in the Australian Capital Territory and owned and operated by an association of like-minded Christian parents and supporters. The official theological position of the school is based on the Westminster Confession of Faith and other expressions of the reformed faith. It currently caters for pupils in years K-10 and is co-educational.

Covenant opened in 1991. As of 2023, it had a roll of around 283 students, and a college feeder program with Trinity Christian School for pupils in years 11 and 12. The school aims to provide quality Christ-centered education to students from Protestant denominations.

In 2013 the school entered into a new phase of its development as it opened its doors to non-Christian students as well as Christian students.

From 2014, the school changed its name to Covenant Christian School, which more clearly reflects its role as a provider of Primary and Secondary education.

There are around 8 classrooms, a science lab, a library, preschool, and a COLA (Covered Outdoor Learning Area) as of 2023. A larger music room was added in 2024.

The school had 183 students enrolled in K-10 in 2021. Of whom, 5 were international students. There were also 37 employed staff at CCS during the 2021 academic year of whom 22 were teaching staff and 15 were non-teaching staff.

== Houses ==
Covenant Christian Schools, like many other schools in Australia, use a house system, and consists of three houses for both Primary and Secondary.

House	Colour	Animal
Taylor		Tiger
Livingstone		Lion
Carey		Cobra

These houses are named after historical Christian figures, James Hudson Taylor, David Livingstone and William Carey.
