= Covenant School (Texas) =

Private Christian K-12 school in Dallas, Texas (USA)

The Covenant School

Location
- 7300 Valley View Lane; Dallas, Texas 75240; United States; 32.925887°N 96.779090°W

Information
- Type: Private school
- Established: 1993 (33 years ago)
- Headmaster: Melissa Hill
- Faculty: 84.9 (on an FTE basis)
- Grades: K-12
- Enrollment: 717 (2023–2024)
- Student to teacher ratio: 10:1
- Color
- Team name: Knights
- Website: covenantdallas.com

The Covenant School is an American K–12 classical Christian private school in Dallas, Texas. It was founded in 1993.

Covenant describes itself as a classical, Christian (non-denominational), K12 institution. The school's curriculum is centered on "orthodox Christian belief" and "the great ideas, art, and books of Western civilization." The mission statement on the school's Mission and History page states that "Covenant exists to glorify God by equipping students with the tools necessary to pursue a lifetime of learning so that they may discern, reason and defend truth in service to our Lord, Jesus Christ."

*The Covenant School does not require faculty members, families, or attending students to be of a certain Christian denomination. In theory, all Christians are welcome. However, all attending families must sign a Statement of Faith affirming Covenant's perspective regarding gender and sexuality---specifically that "professing Christians should resist any and all same-sex sexual attractions and refrain from any and all same-sex sexual acts or conduct," and "affirm their biological sex and refrain from any and all attempts to physically change, alter, or disagree with their predominant biological sex."

== History ==
Covenant carries on the traditions of two prior schools. The first, Covenant Christian Family School (grades K-6), was founded in 1993 by parents who desired a Christ-centered and classical education for their elementary age children. In 1996, several Covenant families joined a small group of other interested parents to start Logos Academy (grades 7-12) so that their children could continue their education within this religious framework. In 2001, these two schools merged to form The Covenant School (grades K-12).

In 2024, the school appointed Melissa Hill as head of school, starting with the 2025–2026 school year.
