= Guadalupe Radio Network =

Catholic radio network in the United States

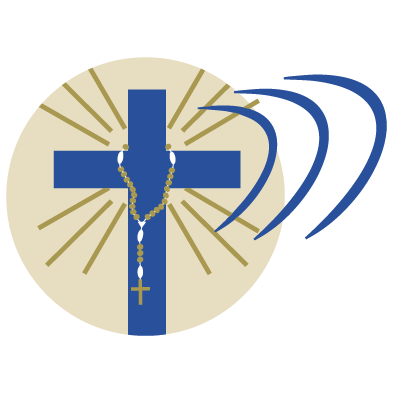
- United States

Links
- Website: https://www.grnonline.com/

Guadalupe Radio Network is an American radio network based in Midland, Texas. It is owned by La Promesa Foundation, and is Doing Business As (D.B.A.) Guadalupe Radio Network. The Guadalupe Radio Network provides Catholic religious radio programming to its stations. As of 2023, it includes 45 radio stations in the United States

== History ==
The Guadalupe Radio Network began on July 19, 2000 with the station KJBC, in Midland, Texas. By 2023, it included 45 radio stations in the Houston, Kansas, North Texas, West Texas, South Texas, Central Texas, Alabama, Florida, Washington, DC, and New Mexico markets.

== Radio stations ==
The Guadalupe Radio Network broadcasts in the following markets:

Alabama & Florida Market

- WJUV-FM 88.3, Cullman, Alabama
- WQOH-FM 88.7, Springville, Alabama
- WMMA-FM 97.9, Irondale, Alabama
- WMMA-AM 1480, Irondale, Alabama
- WDLG-FM 90.1 FM, Grove Hill, Alabama
- WDWR-AM 1230, Pensacola, Florida
- WDWR-FM 103.3, Pensacola, Florida
- WPHK-FM 102.7, Blountstown, Florida
- WCVC-FM 96.9, Tallahassee, Florida
- WCVC-AM 1330, Tallahassee, Florida

Kansas Market

- KQSH-FM 90.7, Dodge City, Kansas

Houston, Texas Market

- KSHJ-AM 1430, Houston, Texas
- KSHJ-FM 96.1, Houston, Texas

North Texas Market

- KEES-AM 1430, Gladewater, Texas
- KATH-AM 910, Frisco, Texas

South & Central Texas Market

- KGWU-AM 1400, Uvalde, Texas
- KJMA-FM 89.7, Floresville, Texas
- KYRT-FM 97.9, Hunt, Texas
- KIVM-FM 91.1, Fredericksburg, Texas
- KBMD-FM 88.5, Marble Falls, Texas

Washington, DC Market

- WMET-FM 103.1, Gaithersburg, Maryland
- WMET-AM 1160, Gaithersburg, Maryland

West Texas & New Mexico Market

- KPDE-FM 91.5, Eden, Texas
- K210BX-FM 89.9, Van Horn, Texas
- KDCJ-FM 91.5, Kermit, Texas
- KBKN-FM 91.3, Lamesa, Texas
- KQOA-FM 91.1, Morton, Texas
- KSIF-FM 91.7, Wellington, Texas
- K219LT-FM 91.7, Clayton, New Mexico

Spanish

- KVDG-FM 90.9, Midland, Texas
- KKUB-AM 1300, Brownfield, Texas
- KJON-AM 850, Carrollton, Texas
- KXGB-FM 105.1, Great Bend, Kansas
- KODC-FM 102.1, Dodge City, Kansas
- KQOA-FM 91.1, Morton, Texas

== Programming ==
Guadalupe Radio Network's programming consists of a blend of original programming and syndicated radio shows. The vast majority of the latter are produced by the radio arm of Eternal Word Television Network or by Catholic Answers. These programs include "Catholic Answers Live", "Catholic Connection" featuring Teresa Tomeo, "Women of Grace", "More 2 Life" featuring Greg and Lisa Popcak, "The Doctor is In" featuring Ray Guarendi, and the Bible in a year with Fr Mike Schmitz,

GRN also broadcasts a number of self produced shows, including 'Morning Joy', 'The Spirit World', 'The Quest' & some internet only programs. Some individual GRN radio stations also include local religious programming, as well as diocesan programming.
