= Notre Dame Catholic School (Wichita Falls, Texas) =

Location
- 2821 Lansing Boulevard; Wichita Falls, (Wichita County), Texas 76309; United States; 33°53′5″N 98°32′46″W

Information
- Type: Private, Coeducational
- Religious affiliation: Roman Catholic
- Established: 1904
- Closed: 2021
- School district: Roman Catholic Diocese of Fort Worth
- Principal: Omar Montemayor
- Grades: pre-K–12
- Colors: Navy Blue & Vegas Gold
- Athletics conference: TAPPS
- Mascot: The Knight
- Team name: Knights
- Accreditation: TCCED and AdvancED
- Yearbook: The Knight
- Website: www.notredamecatholic.org

Notre Dame Catholic School was a Roman Catholic high school, middle school, and elementary school in Wichita Falls, Texas. It was located in the Roman Catholic Diocese of Fort Worth.

Notre Dame Catholic School was one school on two campuses. The lower campus accommodated pre-K through 5th grade. The upper campus accommodated 6th through 12th grade. The traditions of the institution were drawn from the Sisters of Saint Mary of Namur who, in 1904, founded the original school which was known as the Academy of Mary Immaculate. The Congregation of the Holy Cross who joined the Sisters of Saint Mary when the school was broadened to include high school age boys. The original school, which stood on the corner of Holliday and Ninth Streets, was the center of Catholic education in North Central Texas, being the only Catholic school from Fort Worth, 114 miles to the southeast, to Clarendon, 118 miles to the northwest. The present elementary school campus opened in the Fall of 1954 and was known as Our Lady Queen of Peace Parish School. In 1968, Sacred Heart Parish School merged with Our Lady Queen of Peace Parish School, creating a multi-parish school. Today, students attend from these parishes, as well as most of the Catholic parishes in the three-county metro area.

Nate Blakeslee of Texas Monthly stated that as Michael Fors Olson began his term as bishop of the Roman Catholic Diocese of Fort Worth, Notre Dame "had suffered waning attendance and was in need of major repairs."

== Closure ==
After experiencing years of falling enrollment, the cost of deferred maintenance, and a negative balance sheet which forced "Notre Dame to spend virtually all its $581,772 in savings that were on hand at the beginning of the 2014 school year and to borrow approximately $815,000 from the Diocese to cover many of its operational expenses," in March 2021 the Diocese of Fort Worth announced that the school would be shut down at the end of the school year. The high school component is now demolished, with the elementary school remaining. Former principal Joe Cluley stated that right as the closure was happening, the school had "finally turned a corner" and that it would have been economical to repair the school. Additionally, some area parents criticized the closure in Wichita Falls-area media outlets.
