= WTKX =

WTKX could refer to:

- WTKX-FM, a radio station (101.5 FM) licensed to Pensacola, Florida, United States
- WDWR, a radio station (1230 AM) licensed to Pensacola, Florida, United States, which used the call sign WTKX from 1989 until 1995
