= KATH (AM) =

Coordinates: 33°10′32″N 96°54′25″W

Frisco, Texas; United States
- Broadcast area: Dallas-Fort Worth Metroplex/Sherman/Denison
- Frequency: 910 kHz

Programming
- Language: English
- Format: Catholic talk and teaching
- Affiliations: Guadalupe Radio Network; EWTN Radio

Ownership
- Owner: La Promesa Foundation; (Chatham Hill Foundation, Inc.)
- Sister stations: KJON

History
- First air date: October 15, 1936
- Former call signs: KRRV (1949–1975), KIKM (1975–1988), KBLN (1988–1990), KXEB (1990–2007)
- Call sign meaning: Catholic

Technical information
- Licensing authority: FCC
- Class: B
- Power: 1,000 watts (Daytime); 500 watts (Nighttime)

Links
- Public license information: Public file; LMS
- Website: Official website

KATH (910 kHz) is an AM radio station licensed to Frisco, Texas, and serving the northern sections of the Dallas-Fort Worth Metroplex. It features a Catholic talk and teaching radio format. Guadalupe Radio Network, a Midland, Texas, based Catholic broadcasting company, took over operation of KATH on October 1, 2006 along with sister station KJON 850 AM. Guadalupe Radio broadcasts Catholic programs in English on KATH and in Spanish on KJON.

KATH broadcasts at 1,000 watts by day. But to avoid interference with other stations on 910 AM, at night it reduces power to 500 watts. The transmitter is off East University Drive (U.S. Route 380) in Little Elm, Texas.

== History ==
KRRV signed on the air on October 15, 1936 at 1310 AM (at 100 watts, then 250 watts,), moved to 880 AM in June 1940 (at 1,000 watts,), and finally settled at 910 AM by 1949. The call letters stood for "Red River Valley." During the 1950s, it played country music during the day and Top 40 at nights. The station shifted to full-time Top 40 by the 1960s and continued until October 1974, when KRRV shifted back to country.

The next year, in July 1975, the call letters were changed to KIKM, to match sister station, KIKM-FM. The station is owned by Albert W. Brown, who also operated McKinney's KAWB. reverted to an Adult Top 40 format until 1986, when country returned again briefly, then adult standards in 1988 as KBLN.

The KXEB call letters were assigned on March 16, 1990. For a number years following, the station went through several different formats.

For a few years in the 1990s, Marcos A. Rodriguez operated the station as part of his radio group. Throughout the 1990s, the station aired brokered Asian-language programming, ABC Radio's syndicated "Unforgettable" and "Stardust" radio networks and gospel music. KXEB also simulcast briefly with sister station 101.7 KTCY-FM.

Several Spanish-language music formats were heard under the names "Radio Fiesta Mexicana" and "Solo Exitos".

On March 21, 2005, KXEB aired its first day of programming as an Air America Radio Network affiliate. It carried a line-up of progressive talk show hosts.

KXEB debuted its current Catholic talk programming on October 1, 2006, ending its affiliation with Air America Radio. On January 23, 2007, the new owners changed the call sign from KXEB to KATH.
