= American Religious Townhall =

Syndicated weekly television program

The American Religious Townhall is a syndicated weekly television program in which clergy from several religious denominations debate various religious, political, and social issues.^{1} The show was started in 1952 by Bishop A. A. Leiske and continued by his son Pastor Robert Leiske. The moderator of the show is Pastor Jerry Lutz. The show is taped in Dallas, Texas. A different issue is debated on each episode.

== Panelists ==
The show has eleven panelists, six of whom appear on any given episode. The regular panelists are:

- Michael Fors Olson — Bishop of the Roman Catholic Diocese of Fort Worth. He is the fourth Bishop of Fort Worth, and was formerly the rector of Holy Trinity Seminary in Dallas.
- Jordan Ofseyer - Rabbi of Congregation Beth El-Keser Israel (1962–1970), of Temple Isaiah in Palm Springs, California and of Beth Tzedec Congregation in Calgary, Alberta Canada
- Allan Lane — Pastor of Fort Graham Baptist Church in the Lake Whitney area of central Texas.
- Tom Plumbley — Senior Minister of First Christian Church in downtown Fort Worth. The Church is affiliated with the Christian Church Disciples of Christ.
- Ray Flachmeier — A pastor in the Evangelical Lutheran Church in America, now serving as assistant to the president of Lutheran Social Services of the South.
- Othal Hawthorne Lakey — A bishop in the Christian Methodist Episcopal Church, presiding over the state of Georgia for his denomination. His office and headquarters are in Atlanta.
- Bert B. Beach — A minister in the Seventh-day Adventist Church, residing in Silver Spring, Maryland. He previously worked at the world headquarters of the Seventh-day Adventist Church in Washington, D.C. for nearly 25 years in the areas of religious liberty and inter-church relations. He is officially retired, but he is still called upon as needed.
- John Peterson — A minister in the U.S. Episcopal Church, serving as a canon at his denomination's national cathedral in Washington, D.C.
- Jerry Lutz — Senior pastor of the Spencerville Seventh-day Adventist Church in Silver Spring, Maryland and also serves on the adjunct faculty of Washington Adventist University near Washington, D.C.. Lutz has become the moderator of the program since Stephen Gifford's retirement.
- Carl C. Trovall — Associate Professor of Philosophy and History at Concordia University Texas, residing in Austin and affiliated with the Lutheran Church–Missouri Synod.
- Dan Serns — Seventh-day Adventist pastor, of the Richarson Seventh-day Adventist Church on the northside of Dallas.

former panelist:

- Prentice Meador — The former senior minister of the Prestoncrest Church of Christ in Dallas. He held the Batsell Barrett Baxter Chair of Preaching at Lipscomb University in Nashville, Tennessee until his death in November 2008.

== Charter ==
Each episode closes with the moderator reciting the charter of the American Religious Townhall, which provides that "Roman Catholics, Protestants, Jews, educators and others may appear on this program and can declare their beliefs without hesitancy and the rest of the members of the panel will uphold and guarantee that American right to all who will appear, irrespective of race or creed, so that the rest of the world can see that, here in America, we believe in civil and religious freedom, not only in theory but in reality."

== Health Care Facilities ==
The American Religious Townhall generates most of its revenue to pay its television expenses from the various health care centers it operates. This reduces the necessity for donations from viewers and sponsors.

== See also ==
- Religious broadcasting
