= Michael Fors Olson =

American Catholic prelate (born 1966)

His Excellency, The Most Reverend Michael Fors Olson
- Bishop of Fort Worth
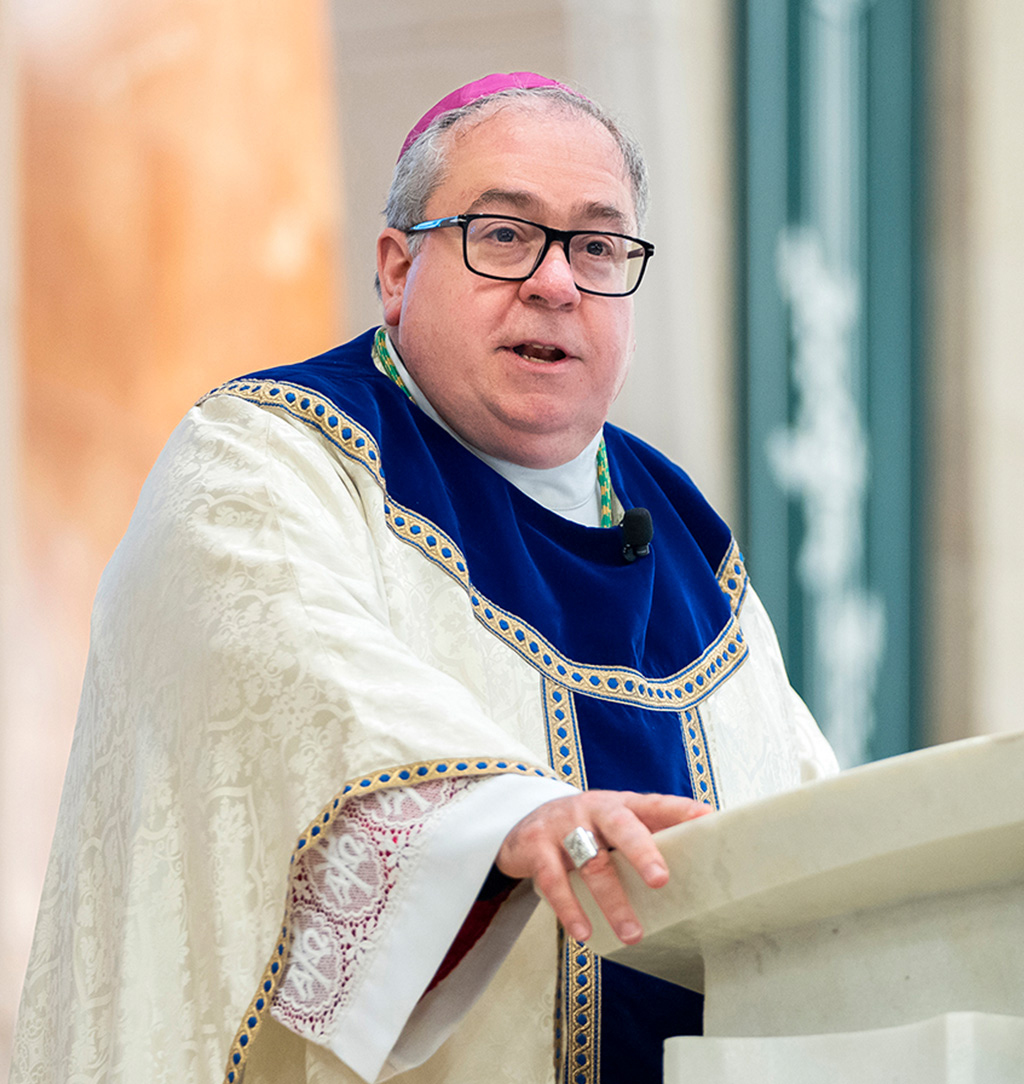
- Olson in 2022, while preaching at Vietnamese Martyrs in Arlington, Texas.
- Diocese: Fort Worth
- Appointed: November 19, 2013
- Installed: January 29, 2014
- Predecessor: Kevin Vann

Orders
- Ordination: June 3, 1994 by Joseph Patrick Delaney
- Consecration: January 29, 2014 by Gustavo García-Siller, Joseph Fiorenza, and Kevin Vann

Personal details
- Born: June 29, 1966 (age 60) Park Ridge, Illinois
- Education: Catholic University of America; University of St. Thomas; Saint Louis University; Pontifical Lateran University
- Motto: Veritatis splendor (Latin for 'Splendor of truth')
- Styles
- Reference style: His Excellency; The Most Reverend
- Spoken style: Your Excellency
- Religious style: Bishop

Michael Fors Olson (born June 29, 1966) is an American Catholic prelate serving as Bishop of Fort Worth in Texas since 2014.

== Biography ==
=== Early life and education ===
Olson was born on June 29, 1966, in Park Ridge, Illinois, to Ronald G. and Janice (Fetzer) Olson. He was raised in Des Plaines, Illinois, where he attended St. Mary's School. Deciding to become a priest, Olson entered Quigley Preparatory Seminary North in Chicago. When the Olson family moved to Fort Worth, Texas, Michael Olson resumed his seminary studies there.

After finishing his early studies, Olson traveled to Washington, D.C. to attend the Catholic University of America. He was awarded a Bachelor of Arts degree in philosophy there in 1988 and a Master of Arts degree in philosophy in 1989.

Olson returned to Texas in 1989 to attend the University of St. Thomas in Houston. He later received Master of Theology and Master of Divinity degrees from St. Thomas in 1994.

=== Priesthood ===
Olson was ordained a priest at St. Patrick Cathedral in Fort Worth by Bishop Joseph Delaney for the Diocese of Fort Worth on June 3, 1994. After his ordination, the diocese assigned Olson as parochial vicar at St. Michael's Parish in Bedford, Texas.

In 1997, Olson traveled to St. Louis, Missouri, for doctoral studies at the Center for Health Care Ethics in the Catholic Tradition at Saint Louis University. He then went to Rome to attend the Alphonsian Academy at the Pontifical Lateran University. Olson was awarded a doctorate in Moral Theology from the academy in 2001.

After returning to Texas in 2001, Olson was appointed as formation director at St. Mary's Seminary in Houston. He left St. Mary's in 2006 after Bishop Kevin William Vann appointed Olson as vicar general of the diocese. In 2008, he was transferred to Holy Trinity Seminary in Irving, Texas to serve as its rector. Pope Benedict XVI named Olson as a chaplain of his holiness in 2010.

=== Bishop of Fort Worth ===
Pope Francis named Olson as bishop of Fort Worth on November 19, 2013. He was consecrated at the Fort Worth Convention Center on January 29, 2014, by Archbishop Gustavo García-Siller. Archbishop Emeritus Fiorenza and Bishop Kevin Vann acted as the co-consecrators.

At the invitation of Olson, the Cristo Rey network of Catholic college preparatory high schools opened a campus in Fort Worth in 2018. Students at Cristo Rey earn more than half of their tuition by working one day each week at corporate partners, thus providing a private school education to economically disadvantaged students.

On September 20-23, 2018, Olson and the Diocese of Fort Worth hosted the fifth National Encuentro of Hispanic/Latino Ministry for 3,000 national clergy and lay leaders in Hispanic Ministry. Olson is a panel member of American Religious Town Hall and a frequent radio guest on Guadalupe Radio Network and The Catholic Current.

Olson reinstated the permanent deacon formation program, and on August 10, 2020, Olson ordained 24 men as permanent deacons at St. Elizabeth Ann Seton Parish in Keller, the first permanent diaconate ordination in 11 years.

Since Olson’s installation on Jan. 29, 2014, the estimated number of Catholics in the diocese has grown from 700,000 to 1.2 million, and Olson has established four new parishes: St. Martin de Porres in Prosper in 2015; St. Benedict in Fort Worth in 2015; Holy Trinity in Azle in 2019; and St. Teresa of Calcutta in Roanoke in 2022.

Olson installed a relic of St. Padre Pio at St. Peter the Apostle Catholic Church in White Settlement on Sept. 19, 2024. The first-class relic is displayed permanently at the church.

The Fort Worth, Texas magazine has frequently named Olson in its special section, "The Most Influential People," since it began the annual list in 2018.

==== Arlington Carmel controversy ====
In April 2023, Olson visited the Most Holy Trinity Monastery in Arlington, Texas, to investigate allegations that the superior, Teresa Agnes Gerlach, had violated her vow of chastity with a priest from another diocese. During the investigation, Gerlach admitted to inappropriate communications with the priest. After the investigation, Gerlach filed civil litigation against Olson, but a judge dismissed the case in June 2023. The Holy See, through the Dicastery for Institutes of Consecrated Life and Societies of Apostolic Life, issued a decree appointing Olson as pontifical commissary of the Monastery, essentially making him the pope’s representative in the matter. In April 2024, the dicastery granted direct oversight and direct responsibility for governance of the Arlington Carmel to the Association of Christ the King in the United States of America, the association of Carmelite monasteries to which the Arlington Carmel belongs.

The Arlington Carmel rejected this decree, and in September 2024, it announced that the monastery had entered an association with the Society of St. Pius X. Olson instructed Catholics in the diocese to not attend mass at, or provide support to, Arlington Carmel, citing the monastery's "scandalous disobedience and disunity."

The Vatican approved a new Discalced Carmelite monastery in the Diocese of Fort Worth: the Carmel of Jesus Crucified, located near Muenster, Texas. Olson celebrated the founding Mass and Rite of Enclosure on December 8, 2025.

== Episcopal succession ==
Catholic Church titles
| Preceded by Kevin Vann | Bishop of Fort Worth; 2014–present | Succeeded by Incumbent |
