= Nolan Catholic High School =

Location
- 4501 Bridge Street; Fort Worth, (Tarrant County), Texas 76103; United States; 32°45′36″N 97°15′24″W

Information
- Type: Private, Coeducational
- Motto: Esto Dux (Be a Leader)
- Religious affiliation: Catholic
- Established: 1961
- Superintendent: Melissa Kasmeier-Millard, Ed.D.
- Assistant Head of School for Student Affairs: Cindy Jung
- Assistant Head of School for Academics: Ryan Faller
- Head of school: Susan LoCoco
- Chaplain: Father Brett Metzler
- Grades: 9–12
- Enrollment: Approximately 609 (2024)
- Colors: Blue and white
- Athletics conference: TAPPS
- Team name: Vikings
- Accreditation: Southern Association of Colleges and Schools
- Website: nolancatholichs.org

Nolan Catholic High School is a private, coeducational, college preparatory school, formerly in the Marianist tradition, and is located in the Diocese of Fort Worth, Texas. It serves grades 9-12, has an average student population of 800, and serves the Church by educating and forming youth in the Catholic faith through its mission.

== School profile ==
Nolan Catholic High School is a private Catholic college preparatory school in Fort Worth, Tarrant County, Texas. It is one of three Catholic college preparatory schools in Tarrant County. Nolan Catholic specializes in providing a faith-filled education that prepares young adults for success in college or university and beyond. The school motto is Esto Dux, which in Latin translates to "be a leader."

Since being founded in 1961, the school has served in the ministry of the Diocese of Fort Worth. Until 2014, the school was under the administration of the Society of Mary (Marianists).

After Michael Fors Olson began his term as bishop of the Fort Worth Diocese, the priests of the Society of Mary were to leave Nolan Catholic; there were fewer and fewer people in the religious order. In 2014, the Marianists departed Nolan Catholic High School. Since then, the school has been administered by the Catholic Diocese of Fort Worth, under the Office of the Superintendent of Schools. Nolan Catholic is accredited by the Southern Association of Colleges and Schools and the Texas Catholic Conference Education Department (as approved by the Texas Education Agency).

Of the 97 members of faculty, two are avowed religious. Among the 115 members of the faculty and staff, 50% hold advanced degrees. Past principal Anthony Pistone (1980–1987), and a priest, William Pais, CMF, were credibly accused of sexual abuse or misconduct.

The traditional college preparatory curriculum at Nolan Catholic requires 27 Carnegie units (3240 hours of instruction) for graduation. Advanced Placement and honors courses are offered in multiple disciplines.

== Athletics ==
NCHS participates in the Texas Association of Private and Parochial Schools (TAPPS) at the Class 6A level. The following sports are offered:

- Baseball
- Basketball
- Cross country
- Football
- Golf
- Soccer
- Softball
- Swimming
- Tennis
- Track
- Volleyball

NCHS sports teams have won state championships in the following sports:

- American football: 2004, 2005, 2008, 2009, 2011, 2012, 2013
- Boys' cross country: 1988, 1999, 2002, 2003
- Boys' pole vault: 2015, 2016
- Boys' soccer: 2001, 2003, 2006, 2011, 2012, 2013
- Girls' cross country: 2007, 2025
- Girls' golf: 2007
- Girls' tennis: 2008
- Ultimate frisbee: 2012, 2013, 2014, 2015

== Notable alumni ==
- Carol Berg, award-winning author of science fiction and fantasy novels
- Eduardo Clark, Nolan Class of 2007, Mexican Deputy Secretary of Health (2024-present)
- Horace Ivory, Nolan Class of 1972 member of the New England Patriots (1977–1981) and Seattle Seahawks (1981–1982)
- Stephanie Klick, Republican member of the Texas House of Representatives from District 91 in Fort Worth
- Dario Lorenzetti, Nolan Class of 1988, U.S. Army and CIA Officer killed in Afghanistan
- Stephen McCarthy, Nolan Class of 2006, member of the New England Revolution
- Katie Meili, Nolan Class of 2009, Olympic bronze and gold medalist 2016 swimming
- Nina Pham, Nolan Class of 2006 first Ebola-stricken nurse
- Chelsea Surpris, Nolan Class of 2015, member of the Haitian Women’s National Team (2020–present)
