= Cassata (surname) =

Cassata is a surname. Notable people with the surname include:

- Francesco Cassata (born 1997), Italian soccer player
- John Joseph Cassata (1908–1989), American Roman Catholic bishop
- Rick Cassata (born 1947), American football player
- Ryan Cassata (born 1993), American musician, public speaker, writer, filmmaker, and actor
