= WPTB =

- Statesboro, Georgia; United States
- Frequency: 850 kHz
- Branding: 99.7 The Pulse, Sports

Programming
- Format: Sports - Fox Sports Radio

Ownership
- Owner: Neal Ardman; (Radio Statesboro, Inc.)

History
- First air date: April 5, 1976; 49 years ago
- Former call signs: WMCD (5/2004-7/2004)

Technical information
- Licensing authority: FCC
- Facility ID: 64417
- Class: B
- Power: 1,000 watts day 25 watts night
- Transmitter coordinates: 32°28′2.00″N 81°50′7.00″W
- Translator: 99.7 W259CH (Statesboro)

Links
- Public license information: Public file; LMS

WPTB (850 AM) is a radio station broadcasting a Sports Talk - radio format Affiliated with Fox Sports Radio. Licensed to Statesboro, Georgia, the station is currently owned by Neal Ardman, through licensee Radio Statesboro, Inc. It uses the dial position of its FM frequency for its moniker, "99.7 The Pulse."

By day, WPTB is powered at 1,000 watts non-directional. But to protect other stations on 850 AM from interference, at night the power is reduced to 25 watts. Programming is heard around the clock on 240-watt FM translator W259CH at 99.7 MHz.

== History ==
The station went on the air as WPTB on 1976-04-05. On 2004-05-17, the station changed its call sign to WMCD. On 2004-07-08, the station changed its call sign back to the original WPTB.
