= KHHO =

Radio station in Tacoma, Washington

- Tacoma, Washington; United States
- Broadcast area: Seattle metropolitan area
- Frequency: 850 kHz
- Branding: Seattle's BIN 850

Programming
- Format: All-news radio
- Affiliations: Black Information Network

Ownership
- Owner: iHeartMedia, Inc.; (iHM Licenses, LLC)
- Sister stations: KBKS-FM, KJAQ, KJEB, KJR, KJR-FM, KPTR, KZOK-FM

History
- First air date: August 1942
- Former call signs: KTBI (1942–1952); KTAC (1952–1992); KMTT (1992–1996)
- Former frequencies: 1490 kHz (1942–1947); 810 kHz (1947–1952)
- Call sign meaning: former branding "K-H_{2}O", the scientific property of water

Technical information
- Licensing authority: FCC
- Facility ID: 18523
- Class: B
- Power: 10,000 watts (day); 1,000 watts (night)
- Transmitter coordinates: 47°13′56″N 122°23′22″W

Links
- Public license information: Public file; LMS
- Webcast: Listen live (via iHeartRadio)
- Website: seattle.binnews.com

KHHO (850 AM) is a commercial radio station licensed to Tacoma, Washington. The station serves the Tacoma portion of the Seattle-Tacoma market. The station is an affiliate of Black Information Network and is owned by iHeartMedia.

The studios are in Seattle's Belltown neighborhood northwest of downtown, while the transmitter is located off 30th Avenue East in Tacoma.

== History ==
=== KTBI ===
The station went on the air as KTBI in August 1942. The call sign stood for Tacoma Broadcasters Incorporated, the company that owned the station. It was originally on AM 1490, powered at only 250 watts.

KTBI later switched to AM 810. That was coupled with a power increase to 1,000 watts but the station became a daytimer, required to sign off at sunset to avoid interfering with 50,000 watt KGO in San Francisco.

=== KTAC ===
The station became KTAC on February 1, 1952. That same year, it made its move to AM 850, still powered at 1,000 watts but allowed to broadcast around the clock. In 1956, KTAC moved its studios and offices to the Winthrop Hotel.

"85 KTAC" was a Top 40 competitor to KJR, KING and KOL throughout the 1970s. Don Wade, Robert O'Smith, John Williams, Ron Erak, Bruce Cannon, Bob Case and Ric Hansen were among the air personalities during its Top 40 dominance of the south Puget Sound area.

=== KMTT and KHHO ===
The call letters changed to KMTT on June 19, 1992, simulcasting with then-sister station KMTT-FM. Entercom sold the station to Southwave Wireless, LLC (Steve West and Dan Walker) in 1996.

On March 11, 1996, the station changed its call sign to the current KHHO. It launched a news/talk format ("K-H-2-O, The Voice of the South Sound") featuring Manda Factor, Jeff Walker and Bruce Cannon.

=== Sports and talk ===
Logo as "Fox Sports Radio 850"

In 1998, the station was acquired by The Ackerley Group and adopted an all-sports format, featuring programming from ESPN Radio, then Fox Sports Radio, CBS Sports Radio and later NBC Sports Radio. For a time, it simulcasted KJR. On November 6, 2000, KHHO broke from the simulcast with KJR and flipped to Fox Sports Radio programming.

In 2002, KHHO was acquired by Clear Channel Communications. KHHO changed from sports radio to a conservative talk format, branded as "South Sound Talk 850", on February 8, 2018. During the conservative talk format's run, KHHO primarily aired nationally syndicated talk shows from Glenn Beck, Armstrong & Getty, Todd Schnitt, Buck Sexton, Clyde Lewis, and Beyond Reality Radio.

The station carried play-by-play of the Tacoma Rainiers Triple-A minor league baseball team until 2019. It was also Tacoma's network affiliate for the Washington State Cougars IMG College network.

=== Black Information Network ===
On June 30, 2020, after stunting with a loop of speeches by noted African American personalities the previous day, KHHO flipped to all-news radio as a charter station of iHeartMedia's new Black Information Network (BIN), which carries local and national news programming catered towards the African American community. The new format competes with Lotus Communications' heritage all-news station KNWN/KNWN-FM.
