= KLPF =

- Midland, Texas; United States
- Broadcast area: Midland-Odessa, Texas
- Frequency: 1180 kHz

Programming
- Format: Christian radio
- Affiliations: Guadalupe Radio Network

Ownership
- Owner: La Promesa Foundation

History
- First air date: August 6, 1950
- Former call signs: KJBC (1950–2007); KVDG (2007–2008)
- Former frequencies: 1150 kHz (1950–2016)

Technical information
- Licensing authority: FCC
- Facility ID: 17235
- Class: D
- Power: 25,000 watts (day); 215 watts (night)
- Transmitter coordinates: 31°56′2.5″N 102°2′34.5″W

Links
- Public license information: Public file; LMS
- Webcast: Listen live
- Website: grnonline.com

KLPF (1180 AM) is a radio station broadcasting a Christian radio format. It is the flagship station of the Guadalupe Radio Network, which provides Catholic religious radio programming to several radio stations in the United States. Licensed to Midland, Texas, United States. The station, established in 1950, is currently owned by the La Promesa Foundation.

KLPF had been granted an FCC construction permit to move to a different transmitter site, change frequency from 1150 kHz to 1180 kHz, and increase day power to 25,000 watts and night power to 215 watts. The license to operate at this transmitter was issued on October 13, 2016.

== History ==
Known as KJBC since it was founded in 1950, the station was assigned call sign KVDG on October 1, 2007. On January 31, 2008, the station changed its call sign to KLPF.
