= KSHJ =

- Houston, Texas]]; United States
- Broadcast area: Greater Houston
- Frequency: 1430 kHz

Programming
- Language: English
- Format: Catholic radio
- Affiliations: Guadalupe Radio Network; EWTN Radio

Ownership
- Owner: La Promesa Foundation

History
- First air date: May 5, 1948
- Former call signs: KCOH (1948–2013)
- Call sign meaning: Sacred Heart of Jesus

Technical information
- Licensing authority: FCC
- Facility ID: 33737
- Class: B
- Power: 5,000 watts (day); 1,000 watts (night)
- Transmitter coordinates: 29°45′20″N 95°16′37″W
- Translator: See § Translator

Links
- Public license information: Public file; LMS
- Website: grnonline.com

KSHJ (1430 AM) is a Catholic radio station in Houston, Texas. It is part of the Guadalupe Radio Network, and is owned by La Promesa Foundation. Some programming from EWTN Radio is also on the schedule. The studios and offices are located in Southeast Houston.

KSHJ's transmitter is off Pleasantville Street in the Pleasantville neighborhood of Houston. Programming is also heard on an FM translator, 96.1 K241CO.

== Translator ==
Broadcast translator for KSHJ
Call sign	Frequency	City of license	FID	ERP (W)	HAAT	Class	FCC info	Notes
K241CO	96.1 FM	Houston, Texas	148446	250	55 m (180 ft)	D	LMS	First air date: April 27, 2017

== History ==
=== KCOH is born; Looking Glass Studios come to life ===
The station began broadcasting in May 5, 1948 as KCOH. Its studios were in the M&M Building (now University of Houston-Downtown campus). It moved to the historic 3rd Ward "Looking Glass Studio" on Almeda Rd. in 1953. Since September 1953, KCOH was the first radio station programmed to the African-American community in Houston, with R&B, gospel, talk, news and blues. In 2013, KCOH programming and call sign moved to AM 1230 KQUE, when AM 1430 was sold to La Promesa.

KCOH programs included "Gospel Melody Time", "Person to Person", "Roex Health Update", "Confessions", "Making Memories", "Sports Rap", "Passion Zone", "This is for Grown Folks", "Person to Person Saturday Morning", and "Just us Oldies". In addition, KCOH was the Houston affiliate carrying University of Oklahoma football and men's basketball games.

In 2007, the station asked for donations from Houston's African American community; the owners threatened to sell the station to radio brokers.

In 2008, the Houston Press named the station as the "best radio station."

=== Sale to La Promesa; flip to Catholic radio ===
In November 2012, the Midland, Texas La Promesa Foundation acquired the station, and announced plans to launch programming in February 2013 through the Catholic-oriented Guadalupe Radio Network. The purchase by La Promesa was consummated on February 28, 2013 at a price of $2.141 million.

On October 19, 2016, La Promesa Foundation consummated a deal which sees them acquire translator K241CO, licensed to Kerrville, Texas, from Wendelynn Tellez, and physically move the facility to a transmit site near Senate Ave. and U.S. Highway 290 in Jersey Village, Texas to rebroadcast 1430. The translator was successfully moved to the new site in Jersey Village, and was licensed on April 27, 2017. The translator was subsequently moved to Houston effective January 24, 2018.
