= WMET =

Radio station near Washington, D.C.

- Gaithersburg, Maryland; United States
- Broadcast area: Washington metropolitan area
- Frequency: 1160 kHz
- Branding: Guadalupe Radio Network

Programming
- Language: English
- Format: Catholic religious programming
- Network: Guadalupe Radio Network
- Affiliations: EWTN Radio

Ownership
- Owner: La Promesa Foundation

History
- First air date: January 1983
- Former call signs: WJOK (1983–1984); WMTG (1984–1986)
- Former frequencies: 1150 kHz (1980–2003)

Technical information
- Licensing authority: FCC
- Facility ID: 4643
- Class: B
- Power: 50,000 watts day; 1,500 watts night
- Transmitter coordinates: 39°11′16.38″N 77°12′54.94″W
- Translator: 103.1 W276DT (Falls Church, Virginia)

Links
- Public license information: Public file; LMS
- Webcast: Listen live
- Website: www.grnonline.com/washingtondc/?station=WMET

WMET (1160 AM) is a mediumwave (AM band) radio station in Gaithersburg, Maryland, serving the Washington, D.C. metropolitan area. Over several decades, it has gone through a number of radio formats, from progressive rock to all-comedy to a conservative talk format. Since May 3, 2010, it has been a Catholic religious radio station.

WMET moved from 1150 kHz to 1160 kHz in 2003. Its transmitter is located in Gaithersburg, Maryland. WMET has a daytime transmitter power of 50,000 watts and a 1,500-watt directional signal at night.

== History ==
The first station in the Washington area to operate at 1150 kHz was WHMC (the Heart of Montgomery County). During the 1960s, WHMC was known as the "500-Watt Flower-pot". 'HMC, as it was nicknamed, hired disc jockey Barry Richards away from WINX (1600 AM) in nearby Rockville, Maryland. He turned the station into one of the D.C. area's first progressive rock stations and the only one on the AM band. The station also sponsored a series of rock concerts underneath the towers (which were on a grassy hillside in Gaithersburg, Maryland) that were well-attended by area teens.

WHMC was shut down on October 29, 1973, after the Federal Communications Commission (FCC) denied renewal of its license over "issues of misreprentation" by owner Nick Chaconas. There were nine competing applications for what was the last open AM allocation in the Washington market. After several years of wrangling before the FCC, a construction permit was granted to Barto Communications in December 1980.

As WJOK, the station ran the first all-comedy format in the country when it went on the air in January 1983. It began before comedy cable TV stations such as Ha!, followed by the successful establishment of Comedy Central, began broadcasting. It was unique at the time for having been the first radio station to broadcast comedy routines from comedy albums recorded by Bob Newhart, Bill Cosby, Eddie Murphy and older radio programs such as "The Great Gildersleeve" and "Baby Snooks". Lesser known, older artists were also aired such as Shelley Berman, Henny Youngman, Hudson & Landry and the Duck's Breath Mystery Theater. Music by "Weird Al" Yankovic was commonly played. From 10:00 p.m. until its midnight sign-off, the station featured "Unexpurgated Comedy", material containing profanity and indecent language.

Originally envisioned by Robert "Bob" Cobbins, WJOK was launched out of the shell of the old rock and roll party station of the late 1960s and early 1970s, with the help of some of his old radio buddies including Tomcat Reeder, and Ron Rubin who hired the airstaff and developed the programming for the World's first all-comedy radio station.

The disc jockeys of WJOK provided patter in between selections and played interactive radio games with the audience for prizes such as tickets to comedy shows at comedy clubs in Washington, DC, including the Comedy Cafe and Garvin's, a comedy club chain with three branches at its height. Their first year's DJs included Brad Krantz, Uncle Walt Howard, Mike Morin, K. Michael Silva, Evan Haning, Steve Willett, and Ron Rubin as the Program Director. In the second year, with advertising down, the original staff left for greener pastures and stronger signals and WJOK was run by Mike Kelly (PD) and Eric Lynch as (Operations Manager) with Eddie "The Kat" Katz, Max Garner, Mike Mahaffie, Dana Cloud, Charlie Kendall, Jack Taylor, Marita McGill, Tony DeNardo, Mac Clift, Tom Jackson, and more.

Some recurrent listeners (notably redneck "Jee-im (Jim) from Poolesville") were integrated into some games. However, the comedy format was short lived and WJOK went off the air due to insufficient growth in ratings. A very weak signal (1000 watts during the day, 500 watts at night), was partially to blame and it was permanently ended at midnight on December 31, 1984.

The station became WMTG playing oldies until June 1986. Later in June 1986, WMTG format was changed to Top 40 with a mix of classic rock. Some of the DJs during the Top 40/classic rock format were Kyle Leslie, Captain Jack Taylor, Michael Thomas, Dave Austin, and Pat Diamond. WMTG was shut down with very little warning on October 15, 1986. WMET went on the air in December 1986 as "Metro Radio", with an adult contemporary format. Some of the DJs when WMET began were Bob Appel, Shawn Anderson and Katie Christopher. Around 1988 WMET went with the Satellite Music Network. The satellite music feed was eventually dropped and replaced with live and local personalities, continuing the adult contemporary format, with brokered ethnic and religious shows on the weekends and mid-day and evening talk shows during the week, in addition to the music. The station also featured top of the hour news from the Satellite News Network, followed by local news from the in-house news staff. The most unique program was the Rocky Road show on Friday and Saturday nights which featured an eclectic mix of blues, country, oldies and rock music.

In the 1990s, WMET simulcast the business news format of WPGC (1580 AM) while airing brokered talk shows on the weekend. The 1994 College World Series final game was broadcast on the station.

By the mid-1990s, WMET picked up the business news format full-time from WPGC. The station's most popular show was The Don MacDonald Show. Show host from various sectors of the financial world would purchase air time on the station. The station also became known as an affiliate of the Frederick Keys (a Baltimore Orioles minor league affiliate) and affiliate of Mount St. Mary's Mountaineers men's basketball. The station's feed was also carried on the Dulles Airport Flight Information Channel on Media General Cable in Northern Virginia.

The Greaseman was hired for the morning drivetime slot in November 2005. WMET switched to a brokered (paid) programming format in March 2006. Greaseman's show was among the few weekday programs to be retained in the transition but he later left on hiatus in November 2007. Until the spring of 2010, WMET aired adult standards from the Music of Your Life network in the slot.

=== Religious format ===
WMET was purchased in February 2010 for $4 million by the Dallas-based Huffines Media, owned by land developers Donald and Phillip Huffines. WMET had previously been owned by Delaware-based CTM Media Holdings.

On May 3, 2010, WMET switched formats to all-Catholic radio. The programming is operated by the Guadalupe Radio Network of Midland, Texas, and provides 24-hour programming in English.

An article in The Washington Times stated: "Two Texas millionaires are funding the Washington area's first Catholic radio station, which is scheduled to go on the air Wednesday." It quoted Donald Huffines as saying, "There are thousands of Protestant stations across the country but Catholics have been behind a little bit as to getting their message on the radio.... I told them [at Guadalupe] I'd help them in that endeavor." The article also stated, "Although Phillip Huffines is a Protestant, Donald Huffines converted to Catholicism a year ago from non-denominational Protestantism. His wife of 22 years, Mary Catherine, is a Catholic from birth and a fan of Catholic radio. Two years ago, they were approached by Guadalupe. "Spiritually, we were led to put a station in Washington," said Len Oswald, president of Guadalupe. "We felt there was a strong need in our nation's capital to have Catholic radio."

In May 2010, WMET programming consisted entirely of nationally syndicated Catholic radio programs. The owners stated their intent to showcase local Catholic programs as well, to include public service announcements, and to offer free air time to the Archdiocese of Washington and the Diocese of Arlington. WMET is the 14th station operated by the Guadalupe Radio Network in the United States. It has a larger population in its broadcast region than any of the other Guadalupe Radio Network stations.

According to an April 28, 2010, press release: "The new lineup starts with 'Son Rise Morning show' with Brian Patrick, then proceeds to 'Catholic Connection' with Teresa Tomeo, 'Women of Grace', 'The Doctor Is In' with Dr. Ray Guarendi & Dr. Colleen Kelly Mast, 'Al Kresta', and 'Catholic Answers Live.'"

The number of Catholic radio stations increased from seven in 2000 to 165 in 2010. Much of the growth is due to these stations being able to use content produced by the Eternal Word Television Network and its radio broadcasting arm.

Effective May 30, 2019, Huffines Media sold WMET to La Promesa Foundation for $1.5 million.

== Other stations with the call-letters WMET ==
The call letters WMET were used for a radio station in Chicago at 95.5 FM from December 1, 1976, to 1986.
