= KJON =

Coordinates: 33°16′42″N 96°49′16″W

Carrollton, Texas; United States
- Broadcast area: Dallas/Fort Worth Metroplex
- Frequency: 850 kHz

Programming
- Format: Spanish Catholic

Ownership
- Owner: Chatham Hill Foundation; (Carrollton Broadcasting of Texas, LP)
- Sister stations: KATH

History
- First air date: 1997
- Former call signs: KRPT

Technical information
- Licensing authority: FCC
- Class: D
- Power: 5,000 Watts (Daytime Only)

Links
- Public license information: Public file; LMS
- Website: Guadalupe Radio Network

KJON (850 kHz) is an AM radio station licensed to Carrollton, Texas, and serving the Dallas-Fort Worth Metroplex. It is owned and operated by Chatham Hill Foundation, which runs the religious Guadalupe Radio Network. KJON carries a Spanish-language Catholic talk and teaching radio format. It is sister stations with KATH 910 AM, which broadcasts a similar format in English.

By day, KJON is powered at 5,000 watts. 850 AM is a clear channel frequency reserved for Class A KOA Denver. For that reason, KJON is a daytimer station and must leave the air at night to avoid interference. The transmitter is off Dallas Parkway in Celina, Texas.

== History ==
The station was KRPT until 1997 in Anadarko, Oklahoma, when it became KJON. The station moved to the Dallas area on June 10, 2003. Station signed on with a Tropical music format on May 3, 2004.

In November, 2006 the station license was transferred from BMP Fort Worth to Chatham Hill Foundation. details
