= KHYI =

Radio station in Howe, Texas

Coordinates: 33.470°N 96.789°W

- Howe, Texas; United States
- Broadcast area: Dallas–Fort Worth metroplex; Sherman–Denison metropolitan area
- Frequency: 95.3 MHz
- Branding: The Range

Programming
- Format: Country/Americana

Ownership
- Owner: Metro Broadcasters of Texas

History
- First air date: August 1, 1969 as KAWB in McKinney
- Former call signs: KAWB (1969–1974); KMMK (1974–1985); KWPL (1985–1988); KSSA (1988–1994)
- Call sign meaning: Calls formerly assigned at 94.9, where they were chosen for their similarity to then-sister station WHYI.

Technical information
- Licensing authority: FCC
- Facility ID: 41328
- Class: C2
- ERP: 15,000 watts
- HAAT: 271 meters

Links
- Public license information: Public file; LMS
- Webcast: Listen Live
- Website: khyi.com

KHYI (95.3 FM) is a radio station with an alternative country music format, focusing on Texas music. The station's city of license is Howe, Texas; it serves the areas between the Dallas–Fort Worth metroplex and the Sherman–Denison metropolitan area, making it a rimshot station. Studios are located along Greenville Avenue in north Dallas, and the transmitter site is northwest of Gunter in Grayson County.

== History ==
The original station at 95.3 in North Texas signed on during the first week of August 1969 under the call sign KAWB based in McKinney with a mixed format of easy listening and country. KAWB's former studios were located between Highway 75 and Highway 121 in McKinney. The station was owned by Albert W. Brown, who owned Sherman's KIKM (910 AM/96.7 FM). On January 9, 1974, the station changed its call letters to KMMK and adopted a MOR format. It was nicknamed "Collin County Radio" right after it relaunched, and was owned by C.R. Graham with the company name of Modern Media of McKinney, which was later taken over by Oaks Broadcasting on May 1, 1984. In the early 1980s, the station became an Adult Contemporary station. When the station changed its call letters to KWPL on October 29, 1985, as 95.3 WPL, the station continued its Adult Contemporary format until June 1986 when it adopted a more Hot Adult Contemporary and Top 40 format mix. The call letters for KWPL stand for "Wonderful Plano", but still remains its license in McKinney.

On August 1, 1988, its Hot AC/Top 40 format was dropped due to the station ending its ownership with Oaks Broadcasting. It became a Spanish Contemporary station. At the time, their call letters were changed to KSSA. The station that is now KHYI was authorized in late 1991 and was licensed in late 1994. It replaced the station that had been on the 95.3 dial position at the time, KSSA-FM now KRVA-FM, which was moved to 106.9 to allow the 94.9 station at Arlington, TX KLTY (then known as KHYI) to upgrade from class C1 to class C, and raise power from 36,000 watts to 100,000 watts. The 95.3 channel was moved outward to the unserved town of Howe, where the new station operates to this day.

== Programming ==
KHYI is an affiliate of the Mean Green Sports Network since August 1974, and carries University of North Texas football and men's basketball games.

KHYI is the home of the Bluegrass Heritage Radio Show, a two-hour program featuring bluegrass and bluegrass gospel music, produced by Alan Tompkins, that has run continuously on KHYI since February 2009. The show is affiliated with the Bluegrass Heritage Foundation, a non-profit organization that presents bluegrass music events and related educational programs frequently in Texas. Alan Tompkins, host of the Bluegrass Heritage Radio Show, was nominated for the International Bluegrass Music Association Broadcaster of the Year Award in 2016, 2017, 2018, and 2020.

== Former programming ==
Throughout its history, the station formerly aired a variety of various local high school and University games.

A few months after KAWB signed on in 1969, KAWB began airing McKinney ISD football games. The station later began to air a primary Plano ISD football games focus into their schedule in the early 1970s. For that reason, McKinney ISD games were separately aired on tape delays throughout the rest of the 1970s and into the 1980s into the station's main focus on the flagship Plano's games (such as Plano, and later added Plano East in 1985). A shorter time later, the station became a flagship for Allen ISD games. Throughout parts of the early-to-mid 1980s, more sporting events such as East Texas Baptist University, Baylor University, and a few other NCAA teams' basketball and football games were aired as well.

During the 1970s, KMMK had a few original talk programs such as "Daily Bread", a 15-minute program that debuted in 1975 and aired on Monday Mornings at 7:15 am; and a Bible and church service programs that aired every Sunday morning and into the afternoon hours.

During the early 1980s, KMMK also aired "Table Talk", a talk program that was hosted by Ray Whitworth and later by C.R. Graham; and had the station's own sports programming simply entitled "Sports Show".

During the adult contemporary and top 40 era of KWPL in the 1980s, the station aired news and information (every 20 minutes) across the Collin County area into their schedule.
