= WDWR =

Radio station in Pensacola, Florida

- Pensacola, Florida; United States
- Broadcast area: Pensacola metropolitan area
- Frequency: 1230 kHz
- Branding: Guadalupe Radio Network

Programming
- Format: Catholic radio
- Affiliations: EWTN

Ownership
- Owner: La Promesa Foundation
- Sister stations: WDLG, WPHK, WCVC

History
- First air date: April 1, 1947 (as WEAR)
- Former call signs: WEAR (1947–1958); WNVY (1958–1985); WBOP (1985–1989); WTKX (1989–1995); WZNO (1995–2007)
- Call sign meaning: Divine Word Radio (former owners)

Technical information
- Licensing authority: FCC
- Facility ID: 21773
- Class: C
- Power: 790 watts
- Transmitter coordinates: 30°25′59.91″N 87°13′8.69″W
- Translator: 103.3 W277CC (Pensacola)

Links
- Public license information: Public file; LMS
- Website: grnonline.com

WDWR (1230 AM) is a radio station broadcasting a Catholic radio format. Licensed to Pensacola, Florida, United States, the station serves the Pensacola area. The station is owned by La Promesa Foundation.

== History ==
=== WEAR ===
The station currently operating as WDWR began broadcasting as WEAR at 1490 kilohertz on April 1, 1947. It was Pensacola's third radio station, carrying programs of the Mutual Broadcasting System and owned by Gulfport Broadcasting Company, consisting of investors from Pensacola and Texas. The 250-watt outlet moved to 1230 on February 1, 1950. WEAR's affiliation soon changed to ABC, in time for WEAR to spawn a television station: WEAR-TV channel 3, which began telecasting January 13, 1954.

On the morning of May 21, 1956, a fire consumed the station's transmitter and two wooden buildings on Bayou Chico. The fire was lit by a five-year-old boy using paper and his mother's cigarette lighter. Four firefighters had to be treated for smoke inhalation after battling the blaze.

=== WNVY ===
In late 1957, Gulfport sold the radio station to the new Florida Radio and Broadcasting Company, a mostly Jacksonville-based concern headed by Ed Bell, an on-air personality in that city. Studio space was obtained in the San Carlos Hotel, and on January 1, 1958, a day after closing on the purchase, WEAR became WNVY. Under its new name and ownership, the station quickly made a mark on Pensacola as a Top 40 outlet. While some criticized the station's music mix—resulting in the station's manager criticizing "the most vicious, dishonest smear campaign ever perpetrated on any radio station" in a newspaper editorial—the relaunched outlet led the Pensacola market ratings.

In 1960, the station left the San Carlos Hotel for studios on Garden Street. It also experienced some financial difficulties; at one point, it was four months behind on payments to the owner of its transmitter tower, prompting him to seek cancellation of the lease before the station paid up. The Florida Radio and Broadcasting Company sold WNVY later that year to Jack Drees and Jim Smith, owners of WKAB in Mobile, Alabama, for $250,000. Under their ownership, WNVY was approved to increase its daytime power to 1,000 watts.

Atlantic States Industries, which at the time only owned one station in Vermont, purchased WNVY in 1965 for $225,000. Under Atlantic States, WNVY initially continued in its Top 40 format. In 1966, after his boss bet that he could not stay on air for 48 consecutive hours, 18-year-old Dick Knight completed a 100-hour air shift.

WNVY moved to a middle-of-the-road "good music" format in July 1967. It also became a network affiliate again, picking up CBS Radio programming in 1969. At the end of the decade, Atlantic States sold WNVY and its licensee, Pensacola Broadcasting Corporation, to Cleve J. Brien; Brien, who paid $80,000, was the general manager and already owned 20 percent.

In 1971, the station changed formats to classic country, promoting itself as "Country Gold". The station tweaked its country blend to be more current in 1977. The revamped format brought with it a new network hookup from NBC.

=== WBOP moves to 1230 ===
Brien attempted to sell WNVY in 1984 to John Walker, Rosemarie Peterson and Steven G. Prickett for $250,000. The sale never closed, and Brien instead divested the station the next year in a three-way transaction. On July 18, 1985, 1230 kHz became the new home of WBOP, an urban outlet which at 980 kHz had been broadcasting since 1956; the 980 frequency was then sold and became WCHZ, "The Big Cheese", utilizing the former WNVY studios and some equipment. WBOP, along with sister station WTKX-FM 101.5, was sold when Holt Communications purchased six stations from the Rodens for $10.5 million in 1986.

=== WTKX: Radio 123 and Kool Gold ===
On December 7, 1989, Holt announced it would pull the plug on WBOP after more than 30 years of broadcasting to launch a new station on the 1230 frequency; Holt noted that WBOP had never been profitable under its ownership. The move left all 14 WBOP staff out of work, including longtime announcer Robert "Cooker" Morgan, and sparked outrage toward the white-owned firm in the African American community; staff found out about the change just minutes before it happened. Holt noted that competition from Mobile FM station WBLX-FM had prompted national advertising accounts to choose that station over WBOP.

WBOP's replacement on 1230 was WTKX, airing an alternative rock format. However, "Radio 123" failed to perform in ratings surveys—unlike WBOP, it registered as a scratch in Arbitron—and it was scrapped in July 1990 in favor of an oldies format from the Satellite Music Network.

=== Florida Information Radio and gospel ===
Kool Gold was short-lived. After being replaced with a simulcast of WTKX-FM, Florida Information Radio took over operations in 1992 under a lease and began programming the outlet with tourism information for visitors to the Pensacola area.

WTKX-AM-FM was sold in June 1994 to Southern Broadcasting of Pensacola for $950,000; Florida Information Radio then acquired the AM frequency outright for $100,000 later that year. Under Florida Information Radio ownership, the call letters were changed to WZNO on March 17, 1995. With a heavy load of sports programming, WZNO became a sports talk outlet.

Mike and Dana Glinter acquired WZNO in 1996 from Florida Information Radio. The couple had decided to move to Pensacola from Kansas City after attending a gospel revival, and in February 1997, WZNO flipped to a gospel format, leaving Pensacola without a sports station.

=== Catholic radio ===
In December 2006, Divine Word Communications, owned by Gene and Jeaniene Church, acquired WZNO from the Glinters for $375,000. The call letters were changed to WDWR, and the station began airing the company's Divine Word Radio format of Catholic radio programming. Divine Word was purchased by the La Promesa Foundation, owner of the Guadalupe Radio Network, in 2015 to create the largest EWTN radio affiliate in the United States.

The sale to La Promesa reignited a debate that had been simmering since 1991 over the location of the station's tower. Located near Jordan and Palafox streets, the tower sits on land that local residents want used to expand a storm water retention pond and reduce flooding in a nearby neighborhood; some residents say the tower's construction was illegal, as it was placed in a conservation district. The original tower had been replaced in 2012.

In 2018, the Federal Communications Commission Enforcement Bureau opened an investigation into translator W246BN (97.1 FM), which at the time was one of two translators assigned to rebroadcast WDWR. An agent of the bureau noted that W246BN was operating from a site other than the one on file with the FCC, 40 miles (64 km) away and not fully retransmitting the station.

== Translator ==
Call sign	Frequency	City of license	FID	ERP (W)	HAAT	Class	Transmitter coordinates	FCC info
W277CC	103.3 FM	Pensacola, Florida	150816	250	123.6 m (406 ft)	D	30°25′59.9″N 87°13′8.7″W	LMS
