= Joseph Patrick Delaney =

American bishop

His Excellency, The Most Reverend Joseph Patrick Delaney
- Bishop of Fort Worth
- See: Fort Worth
- Appointed: July 10, 1981
- Installed: September 18, 1981
- Term ended: July 12, 2005
- Predecessor: John Joseph Cassata
- Successor: Kevin Vann

Orders
- Ordination: December 18, 1960 by Martin John O’Connor
- Consecration: September 13, 1981 by Patrick Flores

Personal details
- Born: August 19, 1934 Fall River, Massachusetts, US
- Died: July 12, 2005 (aged 70) Fort Worth, Texas, US
- Education: Cardinal O’Connell Seminary; Catholic University of America; Pontifical North American College
- Motto: Praised be Jesus

Joseph Patrick Delaney (August 24, 1934 – July 12, 2005) was an American prelate of the Roman Catholic Church. He served as bishop of the Diocese of Fort Worth in Texas from 1981 to 2005.

== Early life ==
Joseph Delaney was born on August 24, 1934, in Fall River, Massachusetts, the son of Joseph Delaney and Jane Delaney. He attended Monsignor Coyle High School in Taunton, Massachusetts. Deciding to become a priest, Delaney entered the Cardinal O’Connell Seminary in Boston. To study theology, he attended the Catholic University of America in Washington, D.C. Delaney then went to Rome to enter the Pontifical North American College.

== Priesthood ==
Delaney was ordained a priest for the Diocese of Fall River on December 18, 1960 at the North American College by Archbishop Martin John O’Connor. Delaney moved to Brownsville, Texas, in 1967 and in 1971 was incardinated, or transferred, into the Diocese of Brownsville. The diocese initially assigned him as assistant pastor of St Jude Parish in Pharr, Texas and Our Lady of Sorrows Parish in McAllen, Texas.

The diocese later appointed Delaney as pastor of Good Shepherd and Christ the King Parishes in Brownsville. He also served as vice-chancellor of the diocese and as chief judge on the marriage tribunal.

== Bishop of Fort Worth ==
On July 10, 1981, Pope John Paul II named Delaney as bishop of Fort Worth. He was consecrated at the Tarrant County Convention Center in Fort Worth by Patrick Flores on September 13, 1981.

Delaney died of pancreatic cancer on July 12, 2005, in Fort Worth at age 70.
