= WDLG =

- Thomasville, Alabama; United States
- Frequency: 90.1 MHz

Programming
- Format: Catholic Radio

Ownership
- Owner: La Promesa Foundation
- Sister stations: WDWR

History
- First air date: 2007
- Call sign meaning: We're Doing Like God

Technical information
- Licensing authority: FCC
- Facility ID: 86328
- Class: A
- ERP: 650 watts
- HAAT: 76 meters (249 feet)
- Transmitter coordinates: 31°44′24″N 87°45′43″W

Links
- Public license information: Public file; LMS
- Website: http://grnonline.com

WDLG (90.1 FM) is a radio station licensed to serve Thomasville, Alabama. The station is owned by La Promesa Foundation. It is airing Catholic Radio programming.

== History ==
Nearly seven years after the initial application was made on April 17, 1997, this station received its original construction permit from the Federal Communications Commission on April 6, 2004. The new station was assigned the call letters WDLG by the FCC on December 25, 2006. WDLG received its license to cover from the FCC on April 6, 2007.

== Silent ==
The station fell silent for the first time on August 21, 2007. Citing technical issues with the station's antenna system, on August 24, 2007, the station applied to the FCC for authority to remain silent. The request was granted on August 27, 2007, with a scheduled expiration date of November 27, 2007.

On February 5, 2008, Nationwide Inspirational Broadcasting applied for an extension to their remain silent authority citing a financial decision to complete the new transmitter site authorized by their October 2007 construction permit rather than complete changes to their existing antenna system. The extension was granted on April 7, 2008, with a caution that the station's license would be subject to forfeiture on August 21, 2008, as the station will have been off the air for 12 continuous months.

WDLG was brought back on the air briefly but fell silent again on August 11, 2008. On August 12, 2008, Nationwide Inspirational Broadcasting filed for a new remain silent authority citing financial difficulties. The station's licensee says the station is seeking a qualified buyer.

WDLG is returned to on-air status in October, 2011.

Divine Word Communications sold WDLG, six other stations, and four translators to La Promesa Foundation effective January 8, 2016, at a purchase price of $1,073,907.59.

== Construction permit ==
On October 3, 2007, WDLG was granted a construction permit to upgrade their effective radiated power to 10,000 watts, raise their antenna's height above average terrain to 205 meters (673 feet), and move the transmitter site north to 32°07'34"N, 87°44'02"W. This permit expires October 3, 2010.
