= St. Patrick Cathedral (Fort Worth, Texas) =

Historic church in Fort Worth, Texas, United States

- St. Patrick Cathedral Complex
- U.S. National Register of Historic Places
- Recorded Texas Historic Landmarks
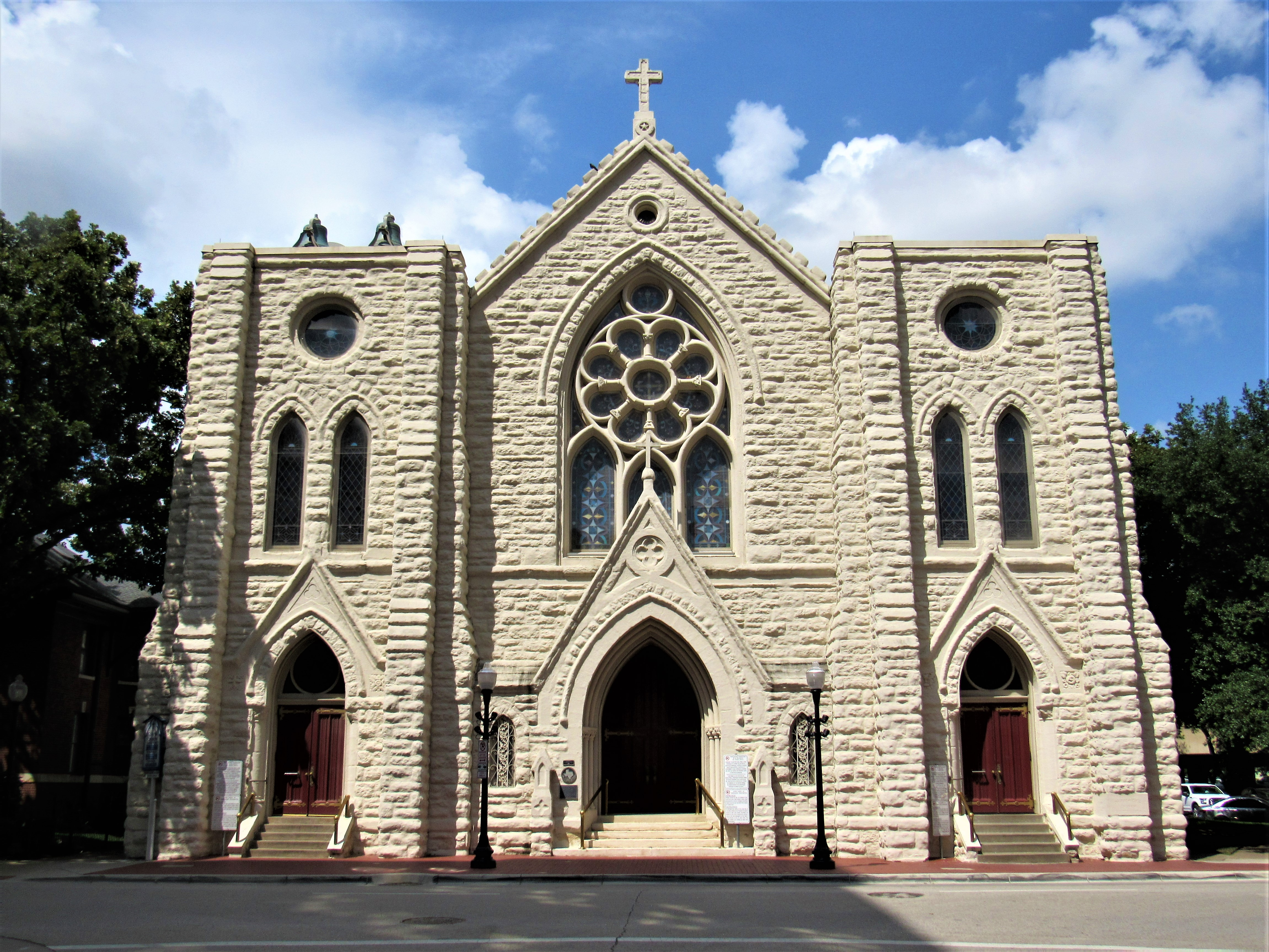
- St. Patrick Cathedral in 2017

- Location within Texas Location within the United States
- Interactive map showing the location for St. Patrick’s Cathedral
- Location: 1206 Throckmorton, Fort Worth, Texas
- Coordinates: 32°44′56″N 97°19′46″W
- Area: 1 acre (0.40 ha)
- Built: 1888
- Architect: James J. Kane
- Architectural style: Second Empire, Gothic Revival, Prairie Style
- Website: St. Patrick Cathedral
- NRHP reference No.: 85000074
- RTHL No.: 4441 (Academy); 4475 (Cathedral)

Significant dates
- Added to NRHP: January 7, 1985
- Designated RTHL: 1962

St. Patrick Cathedral is the cathedral of the Catholic Church located in Fort Worth, Texas, United States. It is a parish of the Diocese of Fort Worth and the seat of its bishop. Construction of St. Patrick's church began in 1888, and it was dedicated in 1892. It is listed along with nearby parish facilities on the National Register of Historic Places as the St. Patrick Cathedral Complex with the church building, the rectory, and St. Ignatius Academy regarded as contributing properties. The church and academy buildings are each recognized as Recorded Texas Historic Landmarks.

== History ==
Starting in 1870, Father Vincent Perrier would visit the Catholics living in Fort Worth twice a year. They met in the Carrico family home. Fort Worth's first Catholic parish was St. Stanislaus. Its church building was a frame structure on Throckmorton Street. In 1879, Father Thomas Loughrey, who by that time had been assigned as the pastor of St. Stanislaus, started a school for boys. Classes were held in the church until 1907, when the frame structure was torn down.

The present St. Patrick's church was built to the north of the old St. Stanislaus Church. The cornerstone was laid in 1888, and the church was dedicated in 1892. James J. Kane designed it in the Gothic Revival style. St. Patrick's was elevated to a co-cathedral in 1953 when Pope Pius XII changed the name of the Diocese of Dallas to the Diocese of Dallas-Fort Worth. Pope Paul VI divided the diocese and created the Diocese of Fort Worth on August 22, 1969. St. Patrick's was retained as the cathedral for the new diocese. It was added to the National Register of Historic Places in 1985.

== In popular culture ==
The interior of the cathedral was filmed for a scene in the 1990 comedy film, Problem Child.

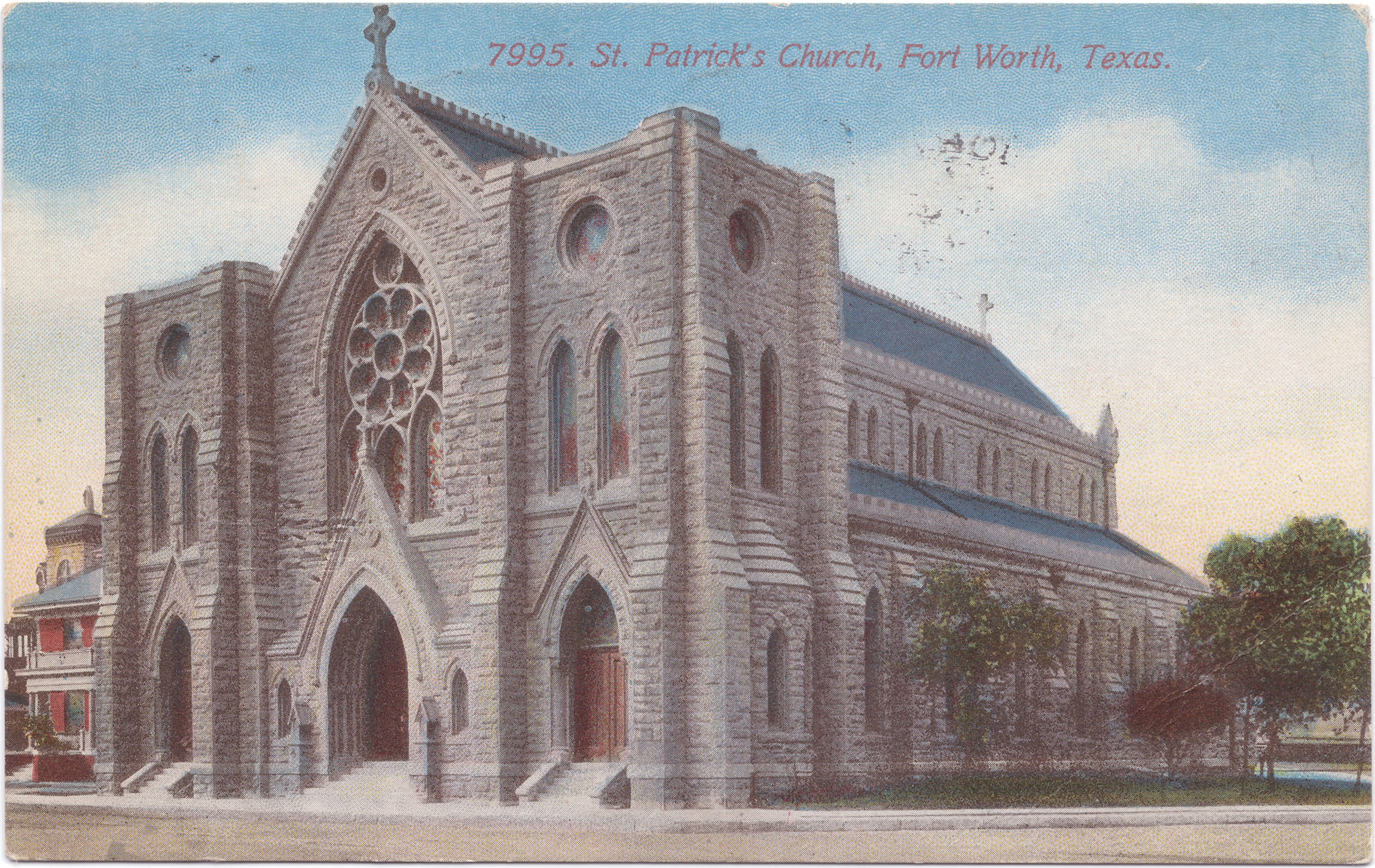
1913 postcard of the cathedral

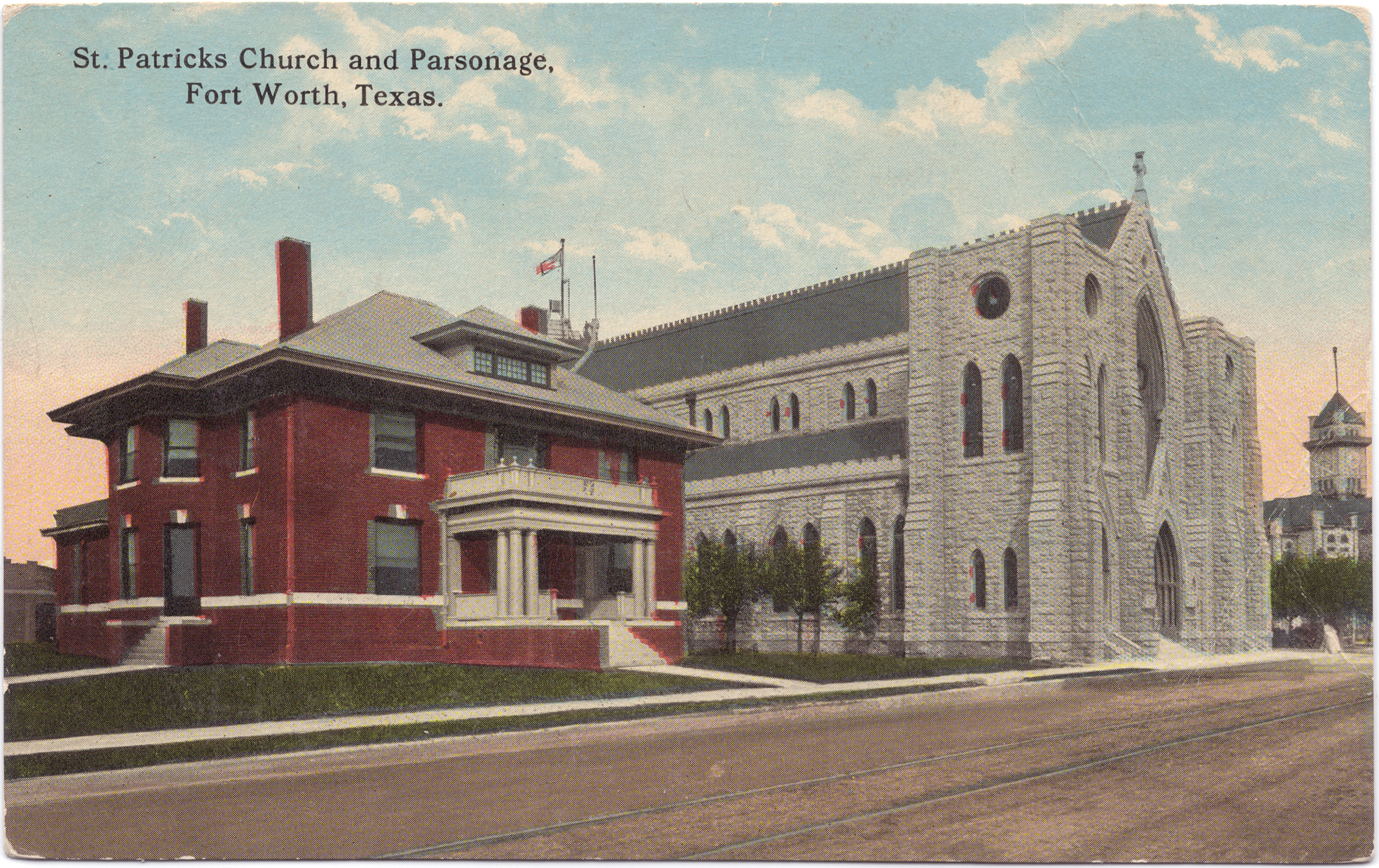
Undated postcard of the cathedral and rectory

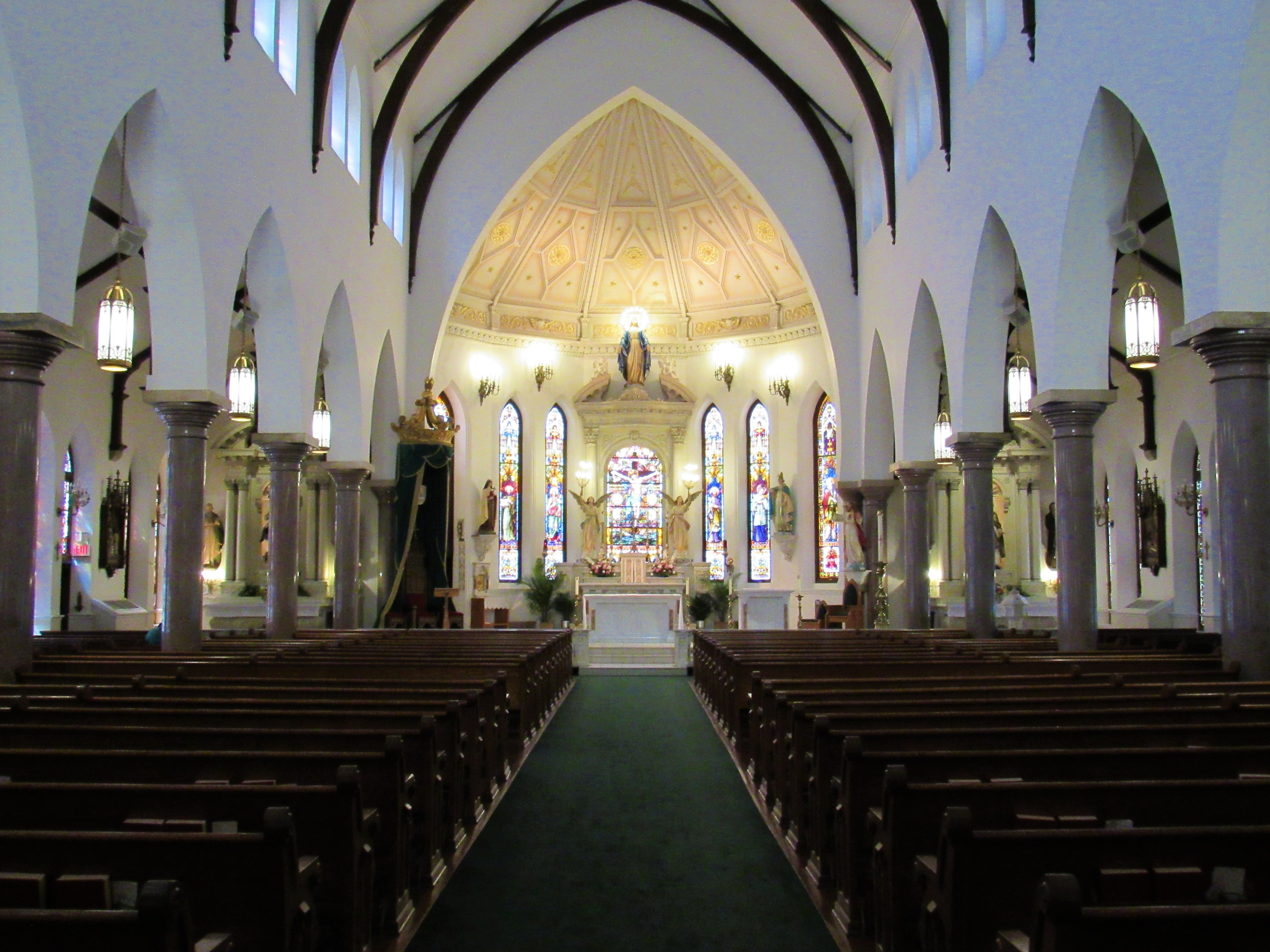
View up the nave to the sanctuary

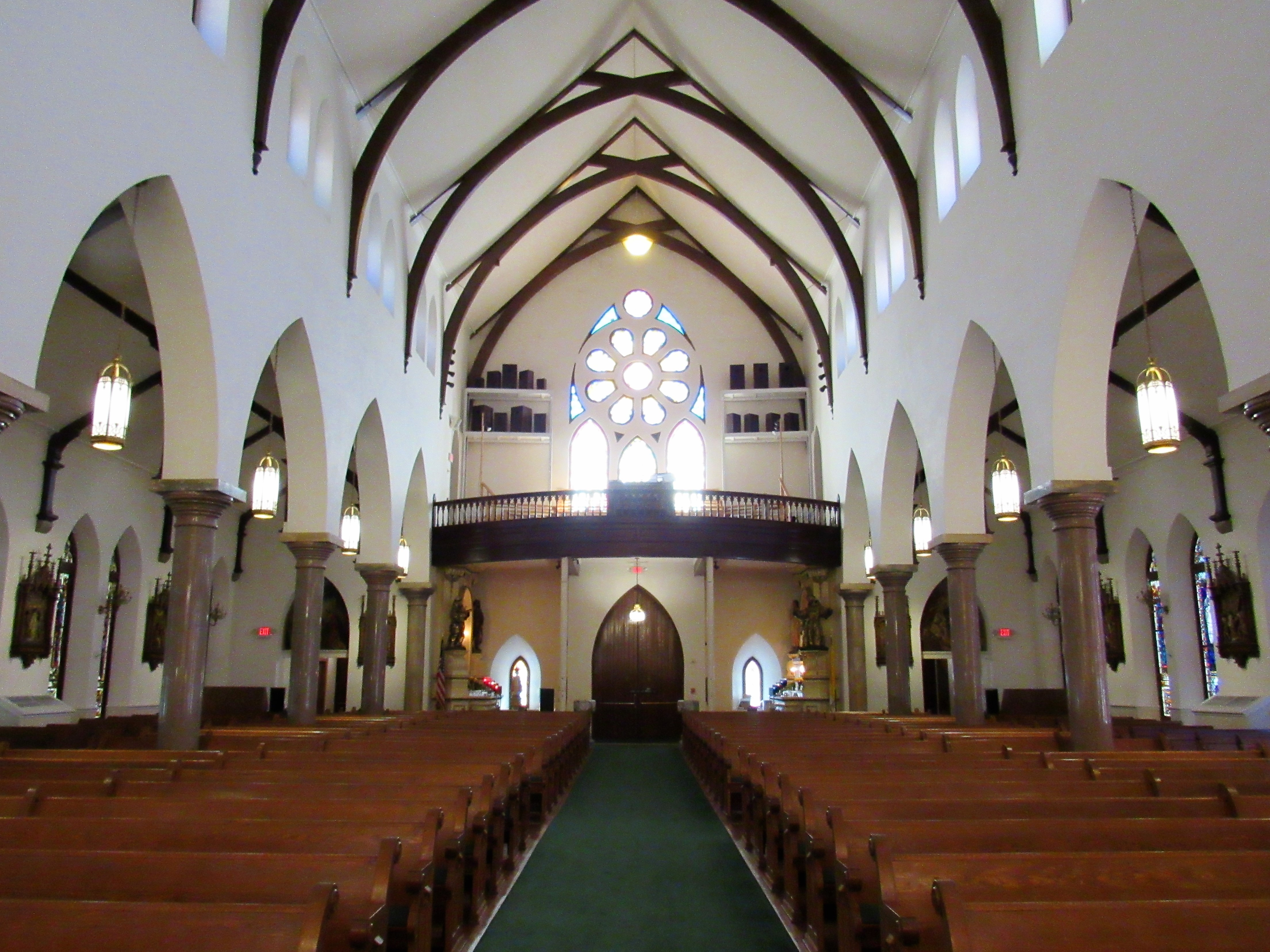
View down the nave to the gallery

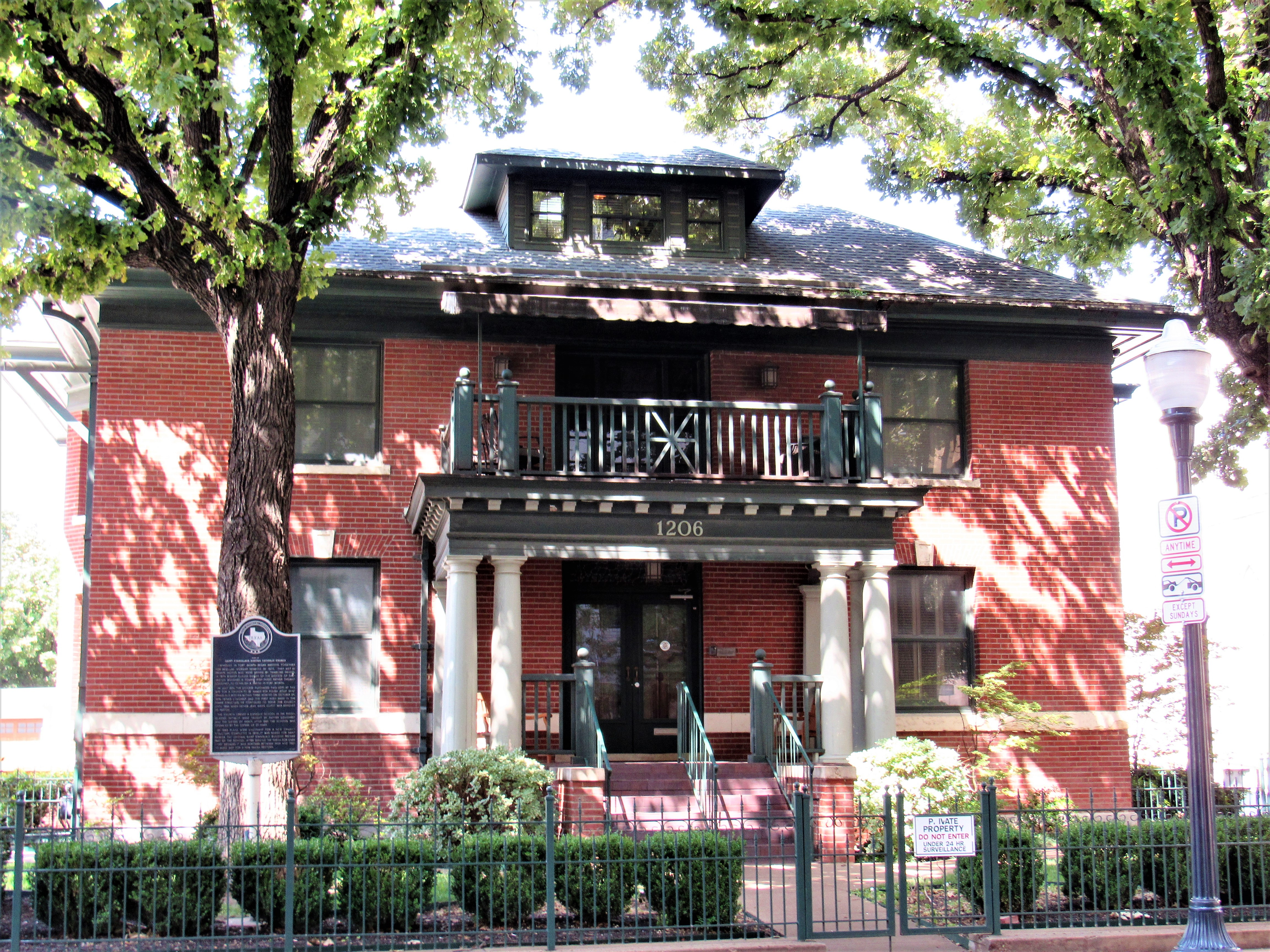
Rectory

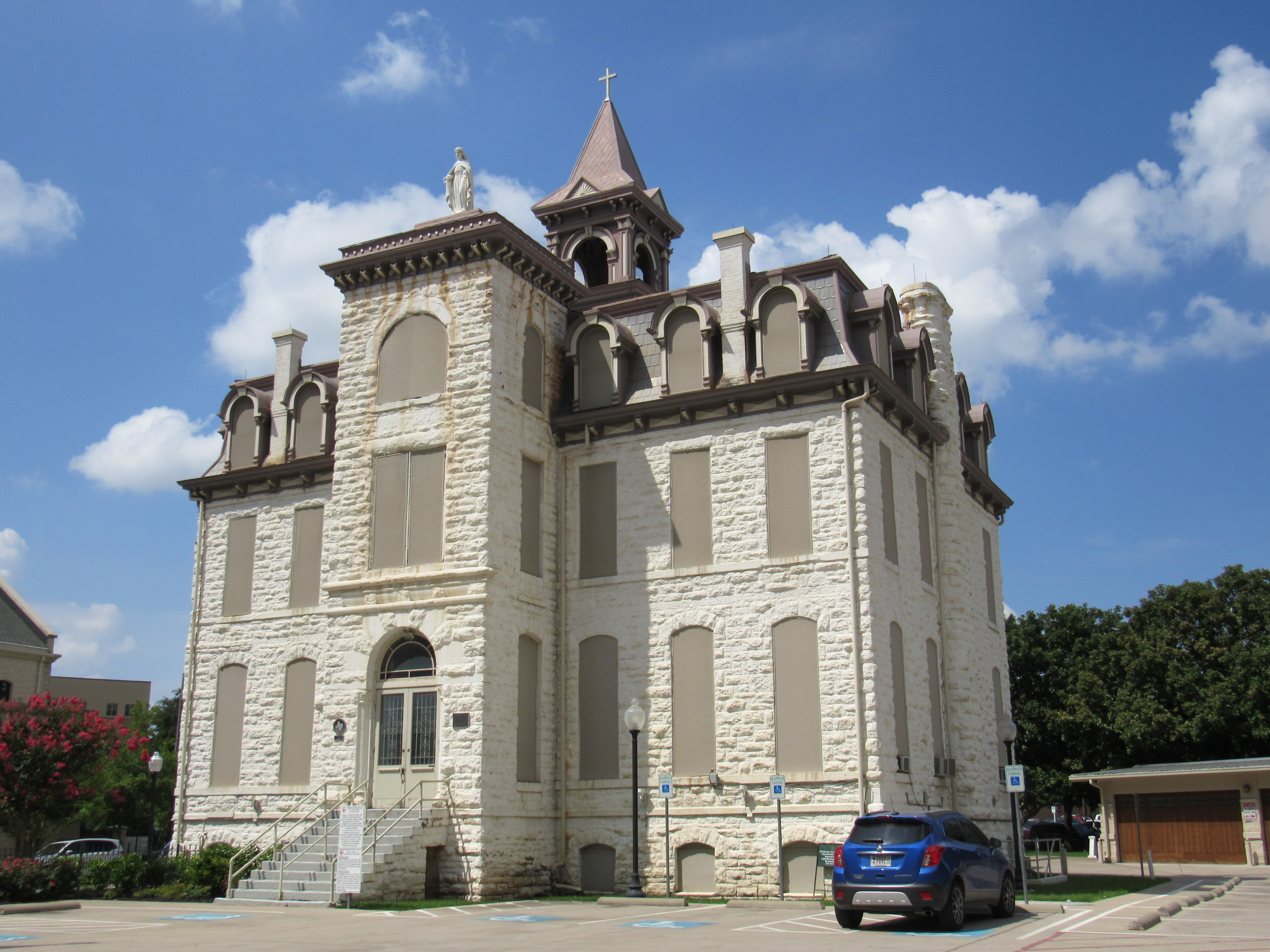
St. Ignatius Academy building

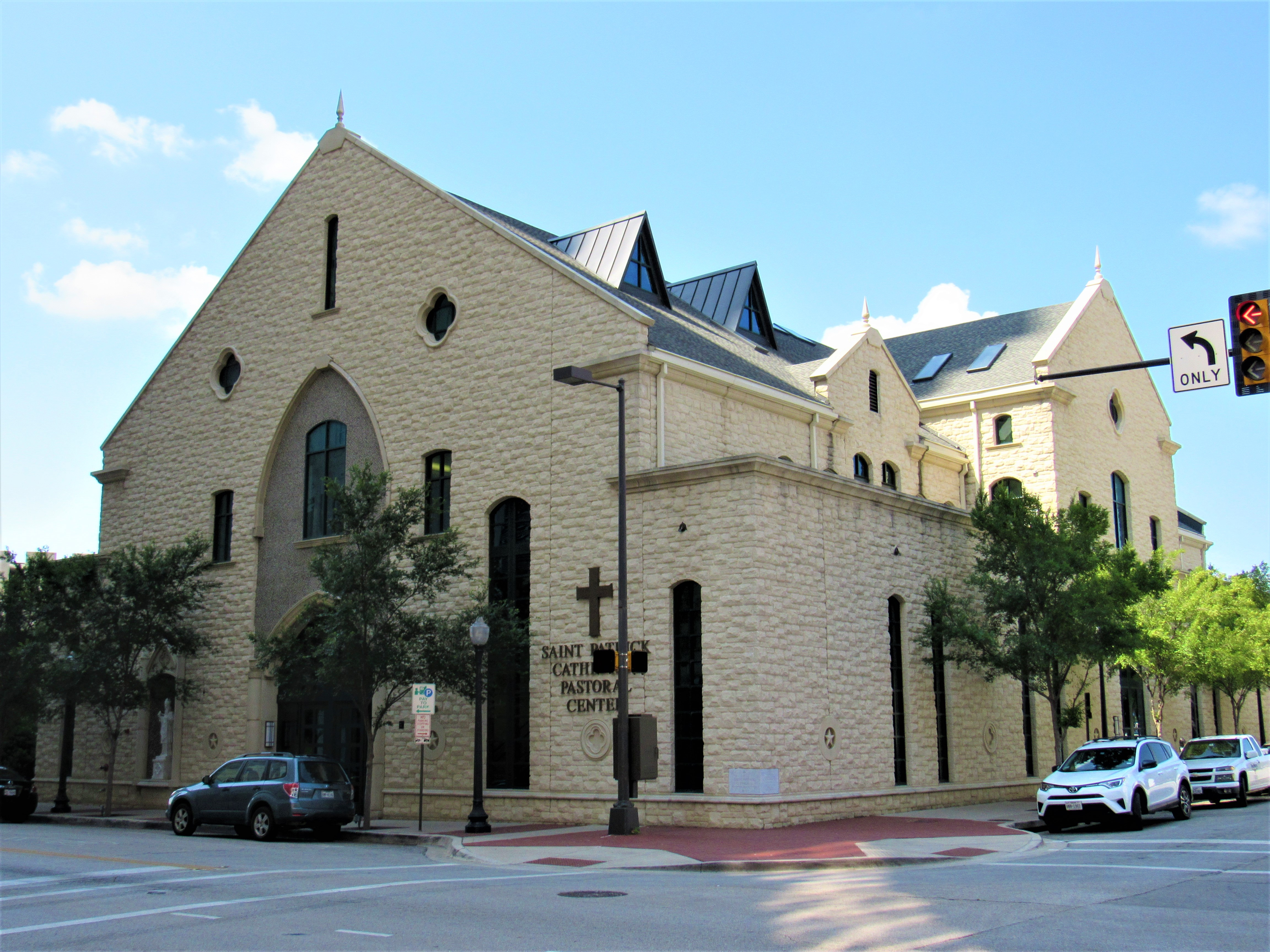
Pastoral Center

== See also ==
- List of Catholic cathedrals in the United States
- List of cathedrals in the United States
- National Register of Historic Places listings in Tarrant County, Texas
- Recorded Texas Historic Landmarks in Tarrant County
