= Ray Guarendi =

American clinical psychologist

Raymond N. Guarendi, also known as Dr. Ray, is an author whose work has focused on parenting, discipline, and family issues.

== Biography ==
Guarendi received his B.A. and M.A. at Case Western Reserve University in 1974, and his Ph.D. at Kent State University in 1978. His experience includes work with school districts, substance abuse and mental health centers, and juvenile courts.

Guarendi has appeared on nationally syndicated United States television programs, including The Oprah Winfrey Show and CBS This Morning, and is a regular on radio programs "Catholic Answers Live" and "The Doctor is In", produced by the Catholic lay apostolate Catholic Answers. He also appears in speaking engagements in the U.S. for Catholic Answers. He also owns a TV show, "Living Right With Dr. Ray", on EWTN.

== Works ==
Guarendi is the author of 12 books:

- Being a Grandparent: Just Like Being a Parent ... Only Different! (2018)
- Advice Worth Ignoring: How Tuning Out the Experts Can Make You a Better Parent (2016)
- When Faith Causes Family Friction: Dr. Ray Tackles the Tough Questions (2015)
- Fighting Mad: Practical Solutions for Conquering Anger (2013)
- Winning the Discipline Debates: Dr. Ray Coaches Parents to Make Discipline Less Frequent, Less Frustrating, and More Consistent (2013)
- Marriage: Small Steps, Big Rewards (2011)
- Raising Good Kids: Back to Family Basics (2011)
- Adoption: Choosing It, Living It, Loving It (2009)
- Good Discipline, Great Teens (2007)
- Discipline that Lasts a Lifetime: The Best Gift You Can Give Your Kids (2003)
- Back to the Family: How to Encourage Traditional Values in Complicated Times (1990)
- You're a Better Parent than You Think!: A Guide to Common-Sense Parenting (1985)

== Personal life ==
He is the father of ten children: Andrew, Hannah, Jonathan, Joanna, Sarah, Samuel, James, Mary, Peter, and Elizabeth whom he and his wife Randi adopted.
