= 850 AM =

AM radio frequency

The following radio stations broadcast on AM frequency 850 kHz: 850 AM is a United States clear-channel frequency. KOA and KICY share Class A status of 850 kHz.

== In Argentina ==
- La Gauchita in Morón, Buenos Aires

== In Mexico ==
- XECPAF-AM in Jalpan de Serra, Querétaro
- XEZF-AM in Mexicali, Baja California

== In the United States ==
Stations in bold are clear-channel stations.

Call sign	City of license	Facility ID	Class	Daytime power (kW)	Nighttime power (kW)	Critical hours power (kW)	Unlimited power (kW)	Transmitter coordinates
KEYH	Houston, Texas	2911	D	10	0.185			29.655278°N 95.671944°W
KFUO	Clayton, Missouri	39258	D	3.8				38.638889°N 90.315833°W
KHHO	Tacoma, Washington	18523	B	10	1			47.232222°N 122.389444°W
KHLO	Hilo, Hawaii	37210	B				5	19.696667°N 155.051389°W
**KICY**	Nome, Alaska	2675	A	50	50	50		64.488333°N 165.311944°W
KJON	Carrollton, Texas	2190	D	5				33.278333°N 96.821111°W
**KOA**	Denver, Colorado	29738	A				50	39.506111°N 104.765833°W
WABA	Aguadilla, Puerto Rico	648	B	5	1			18.400556°N 67.1575°W
WAXB	Ridgefield, Connecticut	66327	D	2.5				41.290833°N 73.487778°W
WEEI	Boston, Massachusetts	1912	B	50	50			42.278056°N 71.267222°W
WFTL	West Palm Beach, Florida	29490	B	50	20			26.541667°N 80.741667°W
WKIX	Raleigh, North Carolina	888	D	9	0.14			35.801111°N 78.814167°W
WKNR	Cleveland, Ohio	28509	B	50	4.7			41.316667°N 81.730833°W
WLRC	Walnut, Mississippi	3494	D	0.94				34.946111°N 88.878889°W
WPTB	Statesboro, Georgia	64417	D	1	0.025			32.465556°N 81.832222°W
WQRM	Duluth, Minnesota	74191	D	50		14		46.655278°N 92.211111°W
WRUF	Gainesville, Florida	69151	D	5	0.086			29.642778°N 82.420278°W
WSMM	Maryville, Tennessee	66618	D	1				35.761111°N 83.982222°W
WSMZ	Muskegon, Michigan	33695	B				1	43.134722°N 86.261389°W
WTAR	Norfolk, Virginia	60472	B	50	25			37.06°N 76.690556°W
WYLF	Penn Yan, New York	39466	D	1	0.045			42.661389°N 77.120556°W

== In Uruguay ==
- CX 16 Radio Carve in Montevideo
