= John Joseph Cassata =

American prelate

His Excellency, The Most Reverend John Joseph Cassata
- Bishop of Fort Worth; Titular Bishop of Bida
- Official Portrait of John J. Cassata the first Bishop of the Diocese of Fort Worth.
- See: Diocese of Fort Worth
- Appointed: August 22, 1969
- Installed: October 21, 1969
- Term ended: September 16, 1980
- Successor: Joseph Patrick Delaney
- Previous posts: Auxiliary Bishop of the Diocese of Dallas-Fort Worth; 1968 to 1969

Orders
- Ordination: December 8, 1932 by Francesco Marchetti Selvaggiani
- Consecration: June 5, 1968 by Thomas Kiely Gorman

Personal details
- Born: November 8, 1908 Galveston, Texas, US
- Died: September 8, 1989 (aged 80) Houston, Texas, US
- Education: Pontifical North American College; Pontifical Urbaniana University; Pontifical Gregorian University
- Motto: Dominus regi me (The Lord leads me)

Styles of John Joseph Cassata
- Reference style: The Most Reverend
- Spoken style: Your Excellency
- Religious style: Monsignor

John Joseph Cassata (November 8, 1908 – September 8, 1989) was an American prelate of the Roman Catholic Church. He served as bishop of the Diocese of Fort Worth in Texas from 1969 to 1980. He previously served as an auxiliary bishop of the Diocese of Dallas-Fort Worth from 1968 to 1969.

== Biography ==
=== Early life ===
Cassata was born in Galveston, Texas, on November 8, 1908. He attended St. Mary’s Cathedral School in Galveston and then St. Mary’s Boarding School in La Porte, Texas. While in high school, Cassata worked as a life guard, soda jerk and vendor at an amusement park.

Cassata then travelled to Rome to reside at the Pontifical North American College. He received a Licentiate in Theology at the Pontifical Urbana University and also studied at Pontifical Gregorian University.

=== Priesthood ===
Cassata was ordained a priest for the Diocese of Galveston in Rome by Cardinal Francesco Marchetti Selvaggiani on December 8, 1932. After his ordination, Cassata was assigned in 1934 as assistant pastor to Holy Name Parish in Houston. He was named pastor there in 1945. In 1956, the Vatican honored Cassata with the title of domestic prelate.

=== Auxiliary Bishop of Dallas-Fort Worth ===
On March 12, 1968, Pope Paul VI named Cassata as titular bishop of Bida and auxiliary bishop of Dallas-Fort Worth. He was consecrated bishop at the Sacred Heart Co-Cathedral in Dallas by Bishop Thomas Kiely Gorman on June 5, 1968.

=== Bishop of Fort Worth ===
On August 22, 1969, Cassata was appointed by Paul VI as the first bishop of the new Diocese of Fort Worth. On September 16, 1980, Pope John Paul II accepted Cassata's resignation as bishop of Fort Worth. John Cassata died in Houston of complications from cardiac surgery on September 8, 1989, at age 80.
