= WCVC =

Radio station in Tallahassee, Florida

- Tallahassee; United States
- Broadcast area: Tallahassee
- Frequency: 1330 kHz

Programming
- Format: Catholic radio
- Network: EWTN Radio

Ownership
- Owner: La Promesa Foundation, Guadalupe Radio Network

History
- First air date: 1953
- Former call signs: WMEN (1953-1976)
- Call sign meaning: Christian Voice of the Capital

Technical information
- Licensing authority: FCC
- Class: D
- Power: 3,200 watts 26 watts night
- Transmitter coordinates: 30°30′32.3″N 84°20′07.1″W
- Translators: W245CB (96.9 MHz, Tallahassee)

Links
- Public license information: Public file; LMS
- Website: http://www.grnonline.com

WCVC is a radio station broadcasting on 1330 kilohertz in Tallahassee, Florida. WCVC is owned and operated by Guadalupe Radio Network of Midland Texas, and broadcasts a Catholic talk format from EWTN Radio.

== History ==
After its launch in 1953, WMEN was at one point the dominating country station in the Tallahassee market, only losing market share upon the rise of FM radio’s popularity in the early 1970s, which drew more listeners to newcomer WOMA (now WTNT-FM). On September 29, 1975, it attempted a switch to an all-news format as a member of the NBC News and Information Service, but fell silent in May 1976. WMEN was sold in October 1976 to Rev. William R. Crews, a preacher and televangelist, who changed its calls to WCVC and relaunched the station as a Christian one on January 1, 1977. WCVC changed its format in April 2001 to talk radio, with callers and hosts discussing news and events of national and local interest. The station changed its format again to EWTN programming in August 2005.
