= Roman Catholic Diocese of Fort Worth =

Latin Catholic jurisdiction in the US

Coordinates: 32°45′26.5″N 97°19′59.5″W

Diocese of Fort Worth Diœcesis Arcis-Vorthensis
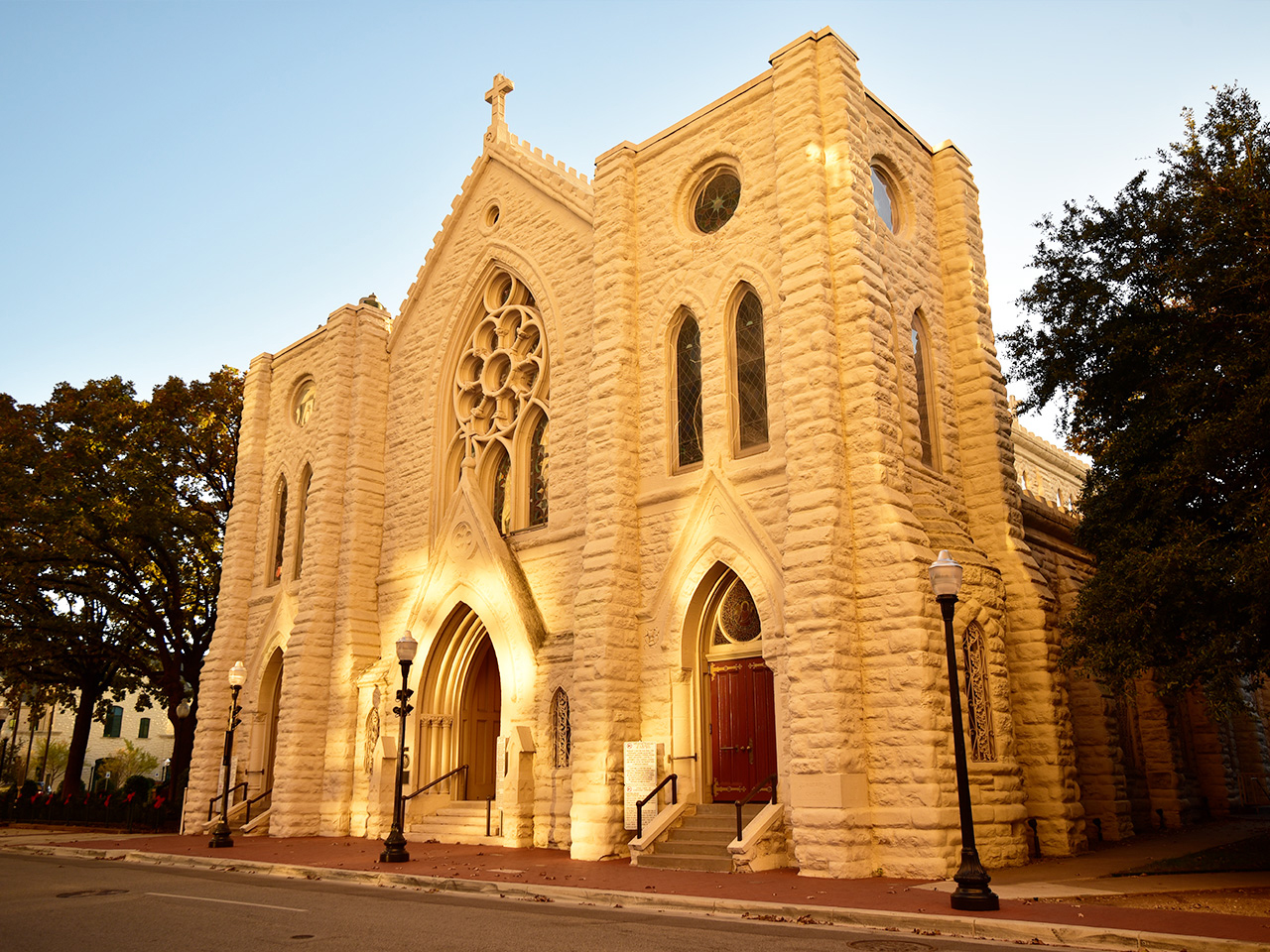
- St. Patrick Cathedral

- Coat of arms

Location
- Country: United States
- Territory: 28 counties of North Central Texas
- Ecclesiastical province: San Antonio

Statistics
- Area: 23,950 sq mi (62,000 km^{2})
- Population: Total; Catholics: ▲3,260,246; ▲1,101,236 (33.8%)
- Parishes: 92
- Schools: 17

Information
- Denomination: Catholic
- Sui iuris church: Latin Church
- Rite: Roman Rite
- Established: August 9, 1969
- Cathedral: St. Patrick Cathedral
- Patron saint: St. Patrick
- Secular priests: 155

Current leadership
- Pope: Leo XIV
- Bishop: Michael F. Olson
- Metropolitan Archbishop: Gustavo Garcia-Siller

Map
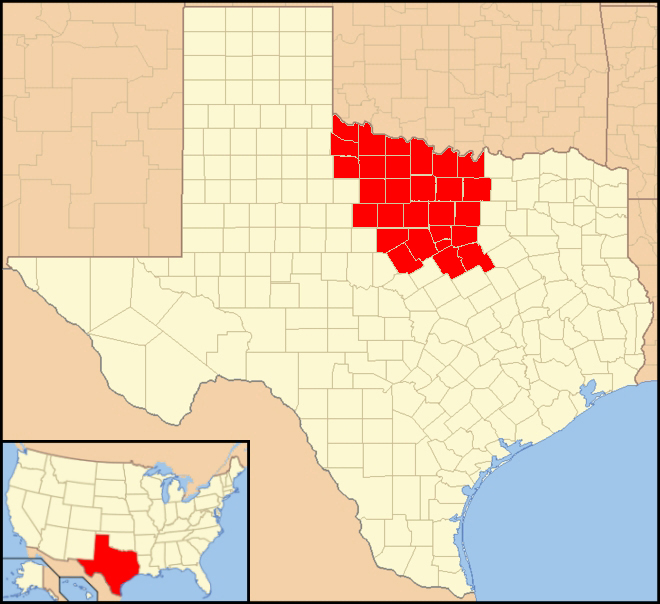

Website
- fwdioc.org

The Diocese of Fort Worth (Latin: Diœcesis Arcis-Vorthensis) is a Catholic diocese in North Texas in the United States. Erected in 1969, it is a suffragan diocese of the metropolitan Archdiocese of San Antonio. The bishop is Michael Fors Olson.

== Territory ==
The diocese contains the following counties with a total area of 23,950 mi^{2:} Archer, Baylor, Bosque, Clay, Comanche, Cooke, Denton, Eastland, Erath, Foard, Hardeman, Hill, Hood, Jack, Johnson, Knox, Montague, Palo Pinto, Parker, Shackelford, Somervell, Stephens, Tarrant, Throckmorton, Wichita, Wilbarger, Wise, and Young.

== Demographics ==
As of 2025, the diocese had a Catholic population exceeding 1,200,000 in 92 parishes, served by 108 priests, 136 deacons, and 47 sisters.

== History ==
=== Name changes ===
The Fort Worth area has been under several different Catholic jurisdictions since 1841:

- Prefecture Apostolic of Texas (1841 to 1847)
- Vicariate Apostolic of Texas (1847 to 1874)
- Diocese of Galveston (1874 to 1890)
- Diocese of Dallas (1890 to 1953)
- Diocese of Dallas-Fort Worth (1953 to 1969)
- Diocese of Fort Worth (1969 to present)

=== 1847 to 1890 ===
During the 1860s, the Diocese of Galveston would periodically send priests to visit the small, but growing, town of Fort Worth. In 1870, Vincent Perrier of the Society of Mary started visiting Fort Worth twice a year. By 1875, the population growth of Fort Worth had persuaded Bishop Claude Dubuis of Galveston to send Perrier and another priest to the town every month.

After 1875, Irish-Catholic workers started arriving in Fort Worth to work on the railroads, prompting the diocese to send a resident priest there. He established St. Stanislaus Kostka, the first Catholic Church in Fort Worth. The first Catholic school opened in Denton in 1874.

In 1879, Father Thomas Loughrey, pastor of St. Stanislaus, opened a boys' school at the church. Weatherford had its first Catholic school in 1880. In 1885, the Sisters of Saint Mary of Namur established Saint Ignatius Academy in Fort Worth and Xavier Academy in Denison. St. Joseph's Infirmary opened in 1885 in Fort Worth.

=== 1890 to 1969 ===
In 1892, the new St. Patrick's Church in Fort Worth was dedicated by Bishop Thomas Brennan of Dallas. The following Catholic schools opened during this time period:

- Gainesville (1892)
- Muenster (1890 and 1895)
- Pilot Point (1893)
- Cleburne (1896)

In 1910, the Sisters of St. Mary of Namur opened Our Lady of Victory College in Fort Worth. In 1953 Pope Pius XII renamed the Diocese of Dallas as the Diocese of Dallas–Fort Worth, and elevated Saint Patrick's Church in Fort Worth to a co-cathedral.

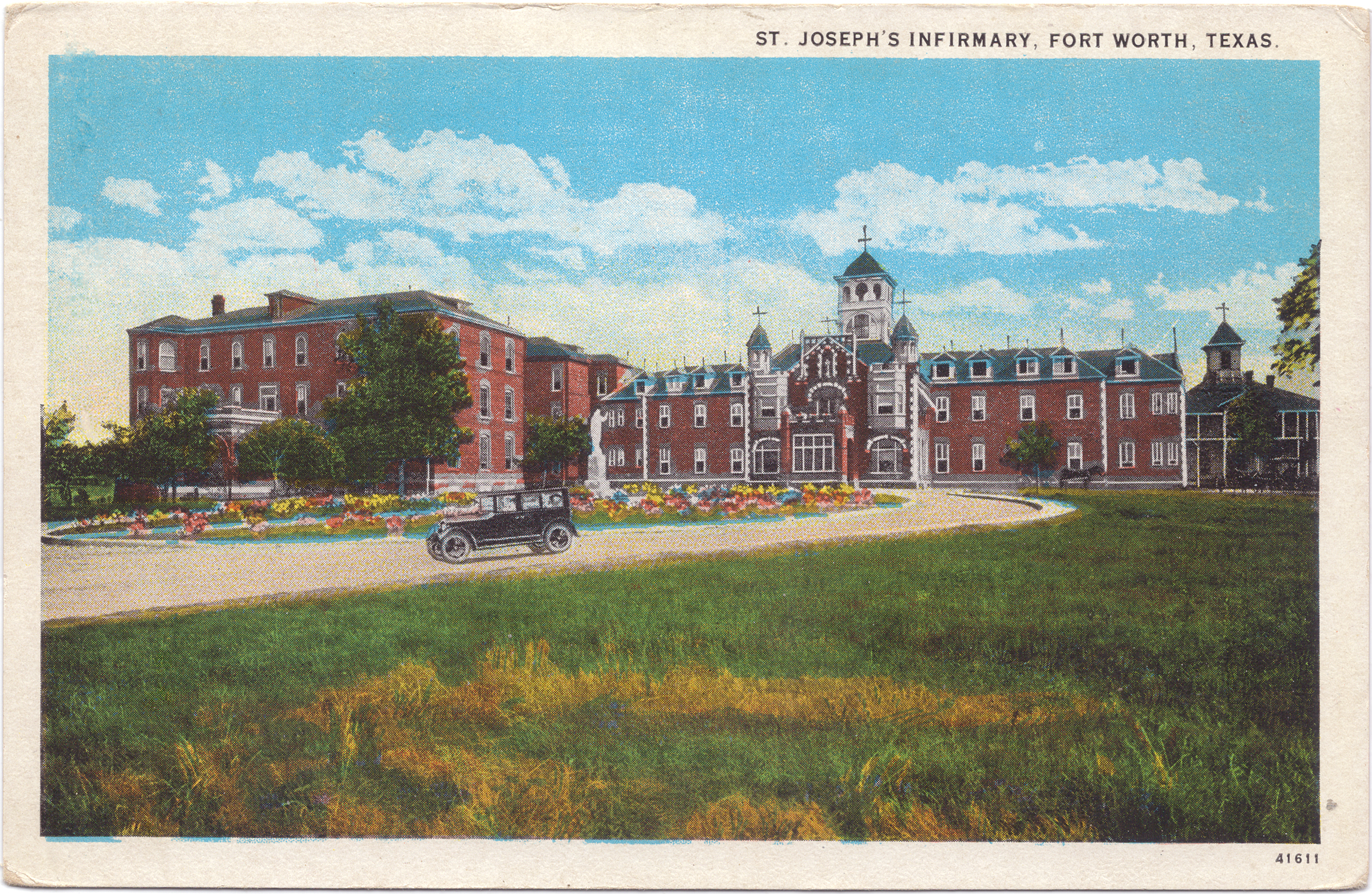
Postcard of St. Joseph's Infirmary, Fort Worth, Texas (1913)

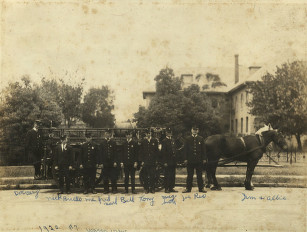
Firemen in front of St Joseph Infirmary

=== 1969 to 2000 ===
On August 22, 1969, Pope Paul VI suppressed the Diocese of Dallas-Fort Worth, erecting the Diocese of Fort Worth and the Diocese of Dallas. He named Auxiliary Bishop John Cassata of Dallas-Fort Worth as the first bishop of Fort Worth. When Cassata became bishop, the Catholic population of the new diocese was 67,000. Cassata retired in 1981.

The second bishop of Fort Worth was Joseph P. Delaney, appointed in 1981. In 1985, St. Patrick Cathedral, St. Ignatius Church, and the St. Ignatius rectory were added to the National Register of Historic Places. By 1986, the Catholic population of the diocese had grown to 120,000. The diocese had 14 primary schools, three secondary schools, the Cassata Learning Center and a new Catholic Center.

=== 2000 to present ===
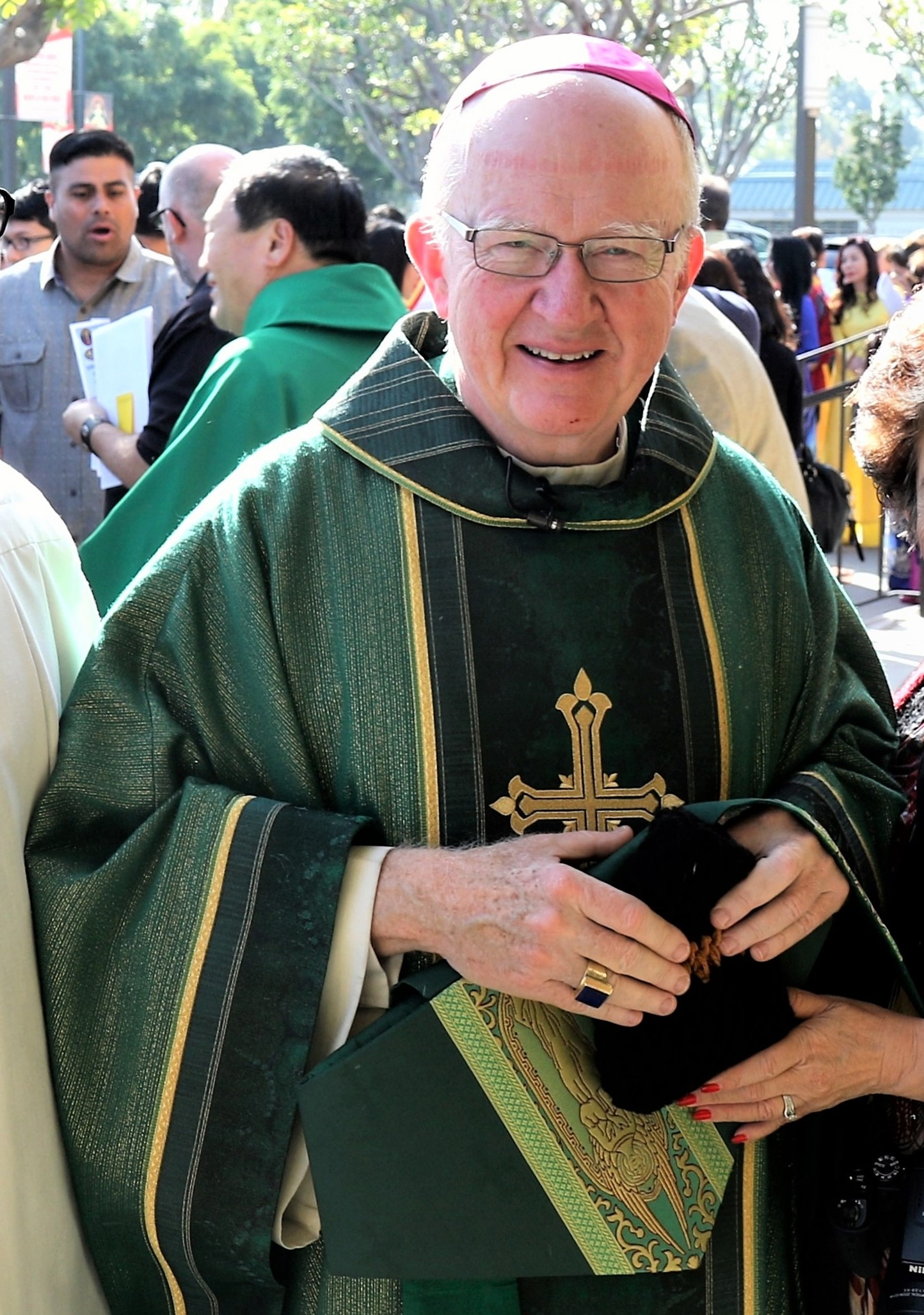
Bishop Vann (2017)

In May 2005, Pope Benedict XVI appointed Monsignor Kevin Vann of the Diocese of Springfield in Illinois as coadjutor bishop in Fort Worth to assist Delaney. However, one day before Vann's consecration, Delaney died in his sleep. The next day, July 13, Vann was consecrated as bishop of the diocese instead of coadjutor bishop. Seven years later Vann was appointed bishop of the Diocese of Orange in 2012. The diocese paid a $1.4 million financial settlement in 2005 to a man who claimed to have been abused as a minor during the early 1990s by Thomas Teczar, a diocesan priest in Ranger. Teczar left the Diocese of Worcester in the early 1980s after being removed from ministry there. The plaintiff had argued that Bishop Delaney showed negligence by allowing him to serve in Fort Worth despite his record in Massachusetts. After being tried and convicted on rape charges in Eastland, Texas, Teczar was sentenced to 50 years in state prison. He was laicized in 2011.In 2007, the diocese published a list of 17 clergy from the diocese with credible accusations of sexual abuse of minors since the 1960s.

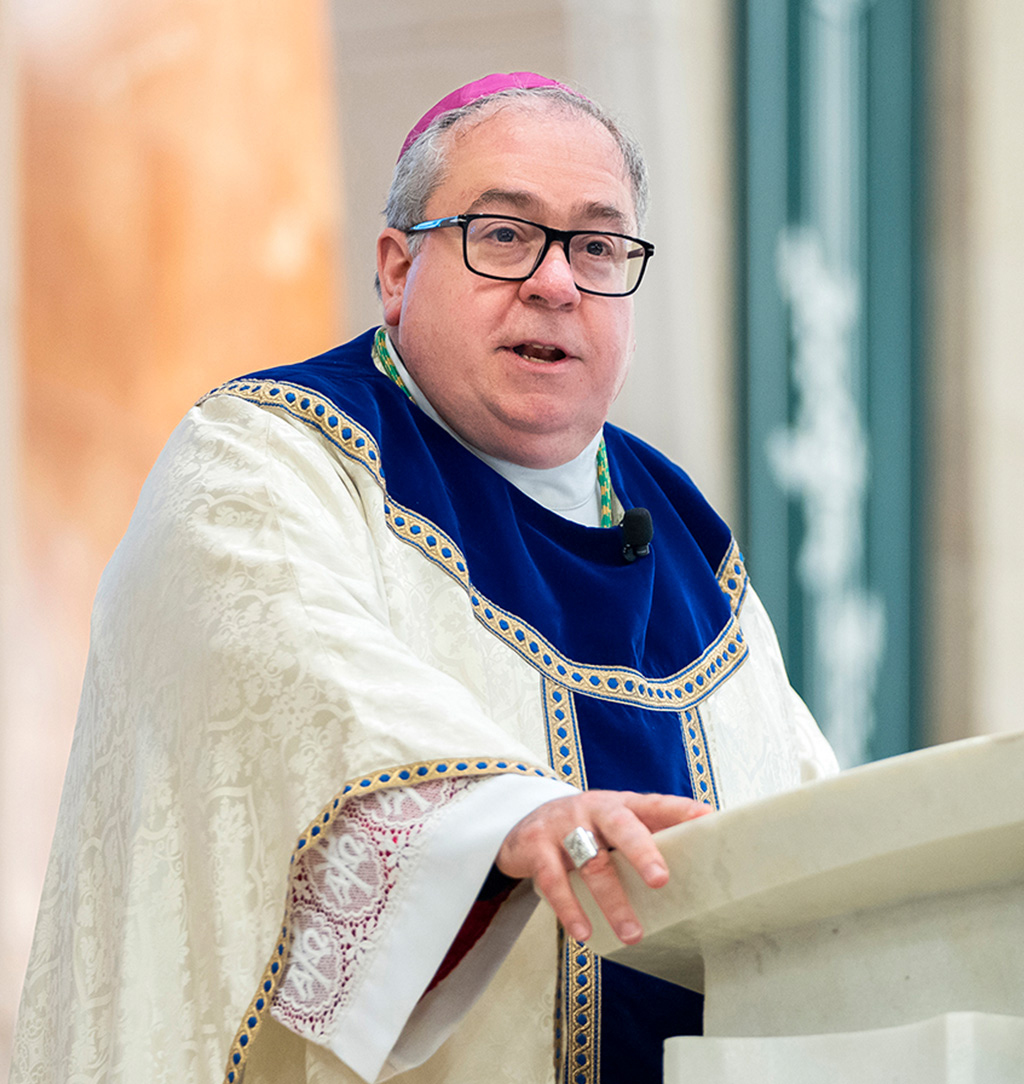
Bishop Olsen (2022)

As of 2026, the bishop of the diocese is Michael Fors Olson, named by Pope Francis in 2013.

In June 2021, six seminarians were ordained as priests by Olson at the Vietnamese Martyrs Church in Arlington. This was the largest ordination class of priests in diocesan history.

A study from the Center for Applied Research in the Apostolate (CARA) at Georgetown University showed that the diocese grew by 878,000 Catholics during the period from 2000 – 2020, making it the third fastest growing Catholic diocese in the U.S.

The diocese has added new parishes to accommodate the growing Catholic population. On Sept. 4, 2022, the opening Mass was celebrated at St. Teresa of Calcutta Catholic Church in Roanoke, making it the 92^{nd} parish in the diocese.

In April 2022, Olson requested the resignation of Christopher Plumlee, CEO of Catholic Charities Fort Worth (CCFW). The agency had planned to host a Women's Empow[her]ment Summit in Hurst in late April. Olson criticized that speakers had not been cleared with diocesan officials. Plumlee originally refused Olson's request, but canceled the summit one month later. Plumlee resigned from CCFW.

In December 2024, the Dicastery for Institutes of Consecrated Life and Societies of Apostolic Life in Rome suppressed the Carmelite Monastery of the Most Holy Trinity in Arlington after an extended battle, both in ecclesiastical and civil court, between Olson and the Carmelite religious sisters.

The Vatican approved a new Discalced Carmelite monastery in the diocese: the Carmel of Jesus Crucified, located near Muenster, Texas. Bishop Michael Olson celebrated its founding Mass and Rite of Enclosure on Dec. 8, 2025.

Our Mother of Mercy Catholic Church, the only historically Black Catholic parish in the diocese, marked its 95-year anniversary in 2025.

In 2026, Heather Reynolds returned to Catholic Charities Fort Worth to serve as its president/CEO, after overseeing the nonprofit from 2005 to 2018.

== Bishops ==
=== Bishops of Fort Worth ===
1. John Joseph Cassata (1969–1980)
2. Joseph Patrick Delaney (1981–2005)
3. Kevin William Vann (2005–2012), appointed Bishop of Orange
4. Michael Fors Olson (2014–present)

=== Coadjutor bishop ===
Kevin William Vann (2005). He was appointed coadjutor bishop, but Bishop Delaney died the day before Vann's consecration. He was consecrated instead as bishop of the diocese.

=== Other diocesan priest who became bishop ===
Stephen Jay Berg, appointed Bishop of Pueblo in 2014.

== Churches ==
=== Cathedral ===
St. Patrick Cathedral – Fort Worth

== Education ==
As of 2025, the diocese had 14 elementary schools and three high schools. The total enrollment as of 2024 was approximately 3,900.

=== University and college communities ===
The diocese operates ministries at five colleges and universities:

- University Catholic Community, University of Texas at Arlington – Arlington
- MSU Catholic Campus Center Midwestern State University – Wichita Falls
- St. John Paul II Parish and Campus Ministry, University of North Texas, Texas Woman's University – Denton
- TCU Catholic, Texas Christian University – Fort Worth
- Catholic Campus Ministry, Tarleton State University – Stephenville

=== High schools ===
As of 2025, there are three high schools in the diocese:

- Cassata Catholic High School – Fort Worth
- Nolan Catholic High School – Fort Worth
- Sacred Heart Catholic School – Muenster
