= List of schools in Harris County, Texas =

This is a list of schools within Harris County, Texas in Greater Houston.

== Public schools ==
This is a list of school districts entirely or partially within Harris County, Texas, with the schools of the latter that are in the county documented here.

All schools within the following districts are within Harris County:

- Aldine ISD
- Alief ISD
- Channelview ISD
- Crosby ISD
- Cypress-Fairbanks ISD
- Deer Park ISD
- Galena Park ISD
- Goose Creek CISD (as of 2022, while the district has territory in Chambers County it does not operate schools within Chambers County)
- Houston ISD (See the list of schools)
- Humble ISD (as of 2022, its one school in Montgomery County, Kingwood Park High School, is also within Harris County, as in it is on the county line)
- Klein ISD
- La Porte ISD (as of 2022, while the district has territory in Chambers County it does not operate schools within Chambers County)
- Pasadena ISD
- Sheldon ISD
- Spring ISD
- Spring Branch ISD

Defunct

- North Forest ISD

The following lists schools within districts partially within Harris County:

=== Clear Creek ISD ===
Zoned high schools

- Clear Brook High School (Unincorporated Harris County)
- Clear Lake High School (Houston)

Alternative high schools

- Clear Horizons Early College High School (Houston)
- Clear View Education Center (Webster)

Intermediate schools

- Brookside Intermediate School (Harris Co. By Friendswood)
- Creek Side Intermediate (League City)
- Clear Lake Intermediate School (Houston)
- Seabrook Intermediate School (Seabrook)
- Space Center Intermediate School (Houston)
- Westbrook Intermediate School (Houston, formerly Webster Intermediate School in Webster)

Elementary schools

- Armand Bayou Elementary School (Houston)
- Bay Elementary School (Seabrook)
- Brookwood Elementary School (Pasadena)
- Clear Lake City Elementary School (Houston)
- Falcon Pass Elementary School (Houston)
- P. H. Greene Elementary School (Unincorporated Harris County by Friendswood/)
- Landolt Elementary School (Unincorporated Harris Countynear Friendswood)
- Margaret S. McWhirter Elementary School (Webster)
- North Pointe Elementary School (Houston)
- G. W. Robinson Elementary School (Pasadena)
- Ward Elementary School (Houston)
- Arlyne and Alan Weber Elementary School (Unincorporated Harris County)
- Wedgewood Elementary School (Friendswood)
- G. H. Whitcomb Elementary School (Houston)
- White Elementary School (El Lago)

=== Katy ISD ===
Zoned high schools

- James E. Taylor High School (Unincorporated Harris County) (Est. 1979)
  - 1994-1996 National Blue Ribbon School
- Mayde Creek High School (Unincorporated Harris County) (Est. 1984)
  - 1994-1996 National Blue Ribbon School
- Morton Ranch High School (Unincorporated Harris County) (Est. 2004)

Zoned junior high schools

- Cardiff Junior High School (Unincorporated Harris County) (Est. 2008-09)
- Katy Junior High School (Katy) (Est. 1965 next to Katy High School, present location 1995)
- Mayde Creek Junior High School (Unincorporated Harris County) (Est. 1980)
  - 1999-2000 National Blue Ribbon School
- Memorial Parkway Junior High School (Unincorporated Harris County) (Est. 1982)
  - 1999-2000 National Blue Ribbon School
- T. H. McDonald Junior High School (Unincorporated Harris County) (Est. 1991)
- Garland McMeans Junior High School (Unincorporated Harris County) (Est. 2000)
- Morton Ranch Junior High School (Unincorporated Harris County) (Est. 2003)
- West Memorial Junior High School (Unincorporated Harris County) (Est. 1976)

=== County-operated schools ===
In addition the Harris County Department of Education, which is not classified as a school district under Texas law, operates several special Education and alternative schools.

=== State-chartered charter schools ===
Charter school organizations

- Harmony Public Schools
- KIPP Houston
- The Varnett Public School
- YES Prep Public Schools

Individual schools

- Amigos Por Vida Friends For Life Charter School
- Aristoi Classical Academy
- Juan B. Galaviz Charter School
- Houston Heights High School
- George I. Sanchez Charter Schools
- SER-Niños Charter School
- University of Houston Charter School (closing 2021)
- Raul Yzaguirre School for Success

Defunct

- Benji's Special Educational Academy
- Girls and Boys Preparatory Academy
- Jamie's House Charter School
- High School for Business and Economic Success, became an HISD charter named Leader's Academy High School for Business and Academic Success in 2007 and later merged into Victory Prep
- Medical Center Charter School, a pre-kindergarten through 5th grade charter school, was located in the Westbury area. Despite its name, the school is not located in the Texas Medical Center area. Medical Center Charter School opened in 1996, and catered to employees working in the Medical Center and had the Montessori method, used until grade two. Its specialty as of 2003 was foreign languages. In 2014 the Texas Education Agency (TEA) announced that the school's performance was insufficient and that it sought to revoke its charter. By 2018 its charter had closed.
- Victory Preparatory Academy (became an HISD charter in 2016, closed in 2018)

== Private schools ==
=== Secular private schools ===
- Alexander-Smith Academy - Houston
- Awty International School (French School of Houston) - Houston
- The Briarwood School - Houston
- British International School of Houston - Unincorporated area in Greater Katy (formerly in Houston)
- Chinquapin Preparatory School - Highlands, unincorporated area
- The Harris School - Houston
- The Kinkaid School - Piney Point Village
- Memorial Private High School - Houston
- Mirus Academy - City of Katy
- The Monarch School - Houston
- The Parish School - Houston
- The Post Oak School - Bellaire and Houston
- The Rainard School - Houston
- School of the Woods - Houston and Hilshire Village
- St. John's School - Houston
- Houston Sudbury School - Houston
- The Tenney School - Houston
- The Village School - Houston
- The Woodlands Preparatory School - The Woodlands, unincorporated area
- Robindell Private School (Kindergarten and grade 1) - In Gulfton, Houston
- Trafton Academy (K-8) - in Willowbend, Houston, Opened in 1973
- Melinda Webb School (infants to 7 years old) - Located in the Texas Medical Center, it is operated by the Center for Hearing and Speech and was previously at 3636 W. Dallas. The school serves as a day school for children not yet mainstreamed into regular classrooms and a speech and therapy center for those that are. Previously known as the Houston School for Deaf Children, it was given its current name, after a deaf girl, in 1997. The girl died of leukemia circa 1958; a former student of the school, she had been the first area deaf child to be mainstreamed into a public school, as she began attending one in Texas City in 1954. Her father, Frank Webb, donated $1 million to what became the Melinda Webb School in 2002. That year its enrollment was 35-40. In 2020 it began admitting preschool students without hearing difficulties to provide a more mainstream environment.

=== Religious private schools ===
Roman Catholic

- See List of schools in the Roman Catholic Archdiocese of Galveston–Houston as almost all of them are in Harris County

Protestant Christian

- Baytown Christian Academy - Baytown
- Christian Life Center Academy - Kingwood, Houston
- Concordia Lutheran High School - Tomball
- The Covenant Preparatory School - Kingwood, Houston
- Cypress Christian School - Cypress, unincorporated area
- Episcopal High School - Bellaire
- Faith West Academy - Unincorporated area, Greater Katy
- Family Christian Academy - Channelview, unincorporated area
- Grace Christian Academy - Clear Lake City and Houston
- Highlands Latin School, a private K-12 Christian School, is in Meyerland Section 3. The campus previously housed Pilgrim Lutheran School, a private K-8 Christian School, which later closed its K-8 section and now only has early childhood.
- Lutheran High School North (Texas) - Houston
- Lutheran South Academy - Houston
- Northland Christian School - Unincorporated area
- The Oaks Adventist Christian School - Unincorporated area
- River Oaks Baptist School - Houston
- Rosehill Christian School - Rose Hill, unincorporated area
- Second Baptist School - Houston
- St. Francis Episcopal School - Houston and Piney Point Village
- St. Stephen's Episcopal School - Houston
- St. Thomas Episcopal School - Houston
- Westbury Christian School - Houston
- St. Mark's Episcopal School - West University Place
- St. Nicholas School (K-8) is an Anglican school. In 1987 the school was established, and in 1993 it opened the Saint Nicholas School II campus in the Texas Medical Center. As of 2020 residents of apartment complexes make up about 25% of the parents of the students, and the school rents from Bethany United Methodist Church. It will later occupy a new development on a 47-acre (19 ha) property along South Main Street, in the 5 Corners District.
- Veritas Christian Academy of Houston in Bellaire
- Yellowstone Schools - Houston

Greek Orthodox

- Annunciation Orthodox School - Houston

Jewish

- Robert M. Beren Academy - Houston
- The Emery/Weiner School - Houston
- Torah Day School of Houston - Houston
- Beth Yeshurun Day School - Houston
- Shlenker School - Houston

Muslim

- Al-Hadi School of Accelerative Learning - Houston
- Iman Academy - Houston
- Islamic Education Institute of Texas (Darul Arqam Schools) - Multiple campuses in Harris County, some in Houston, some in unincorporated areas

Defunct

- Mount Carmel High School (Houston)
- North Houston Baptist School - Houston
- Pilgrim Lutheran School (K-8), in Meyerland, Houston It now only has early childhood as its K-8 section closed, with Highlands Latin School occupying the space.

== See also ==
- List of schools in Houston - Includes parts of Houston in Fort Bend and Montgomery counties
