= List of schools in Houston =

This is a list of schools within Houston. Almost all of the city is in Harris County but some parts are in Fort Bend County and Montgomery County.

== Public high schools ==
This is a list of school districts which cover sections of the Houston city limits.

- Houston ISD (See the list of schools)
- Aldine ISD
- Alief ISD
- Clear Creek ISD
- Conroe ISD
- Crosby ISD
- Cypress-Fairbanks ISD
- Galena Park ISD
- Humble ISD
- Klein ISD
- New Caney ISD
- Pasadena ISD
- Sheldon ISD
- Spring ISD
- Spring Branch ISD
- Katy ISD

Defunct

- North Forest ISD

=== Individual district-operated schools ===
Note that there are portions of Houston zoned to schools outside of the city limits, and vice versa.

Each of these school districts has or had (in the case of North Forest) a majority of its territory in the Houston city limits, so consult the district pages for lists of their schools:

- All Houston ISD schools except Bellaire High School, Pin Oak Middle School (Bellaire), West University Elementary School (West University Place), Condit Elementary School (Bellaire), and Horn Elementary School (Bellaire) are in the city limits of Houston. Formerly Gordon Elementary School and Mandarin Immersion Magnet School were in the Bellaire city limits. See: List of Houston Independent School District schools
- Most Alief ISD schools are in the city of Houston; those in unincorporated areas include Alief Taylor High School, Jack Albright Middle School, O'Donnell Middle School, Judith G. Miller Intermediate School, Charlette Taylor Hearne Elementary School, Howard J. Hicks Elementary School, David Kent Holmquist Elementary School, Willard L. Petrosky Elementary School, and Flem Rees Elementary School
- All Spring Branch ISD schools except Memorial High School (Hedwig Village), Spring Branch Middle School (Hedwig Village), Bunker Hill Elementary School (Bunker Hill Village), Frostwood Elementary School (Bunker Hill Village), Hunters Creek Elementary School (Hunters Creek Village), and Memorial Drive Elementary School (Piney Point Village) are in the city limits of Houston
- North Forest ISD (closed 2013) had its schools in the Houston city limits

The following are of school districts with some territory in Houston: Only schools in the Houston city limits are listed here; schools physically located in unincorporated areas or other municipalities which have "Houston, Texas" United States Postal Service addresses are not listed here.

- Aldine Independent School District
  - Aldine Senior High School
  - Carver High School
  - Eisenhower Senior High School
  - Victory Early College High School
  - Aldine Ninth Grade School
  - Dunn Elementary School
  - Eisenhower Ninth Grade School
  - Hoffman Middle School
  - Thomas J. Stovall Middle School
  - Anderson Academy
  - Mary M. Bethune Academy
  - Caraway Elementary School
  - Ermel Elementary School
  - Goodman Elementary School (formerly Hidden Valley Elementary School)
  - Harris Academy
  - Marcella Elementary School
  - Smith Academy
  - Stovall Academy
  - Thompson Elementary School
  - Reece Pre-K – K Academy
  - Vines EC/PK & Head Start Center
- Clear Creek Independent School District
  - Clear Lake High School
  - Clear Lake Intermediate School
  - Space Center Intermediate School
  - Armand Bayou Elementary School
  - Clear Lake City Elementary School
  - Falcon Pass Elementary School
  - North Pointe Elementary School
  - John F. Ward Elementary School
  - G. H. Whitcomb Elementary School
- Cypress Fairbanks Independent School District
  - Berta Dean Middle School
  - Bane Elementary School
  - Lillie Holbrook Elementary School
- Fort Bend Independent School District
  - Willowridge High School
  - Christa McAuliffe Middle School
  - Blue Ridge Elementary School
  - Briargate Elementary School
  - Ridgegate Elementary School - Construction began in 1979 and it opened in January 1981
  - Ridgemont Elementary School
- Galena Park Independent School District
  - Woodland Acres Middle School
  - Cimarron Elementary School
  - Pyburn Elementary School
  - Woodland Acres Elementary School - Opened in the 1950s and occupied its current building in August 2018. As of 2019 it had about 400 students
- Humble Independent School District (includes Kingwood)
  - Kingwood High School (Kingwood)
  - Kingwood Park High School (Kingwood)
  - Atascocita Middle School (within the limited purpose city limits)
  - Creekwood Middle School (Kingwood)
  - Kingwood Middle School (Kingwood)
  - Riverwood Middle School (Kingwood)
  - Bear Branch Elementary School (Kingwood)
  - Deerwood Elementary School (Kingwood)
  - Elm Grove Elementary School (Kingwood)
  - Foster Elementary School (Kingwood)
  - Lakeshore Elementary School (within the limited purpose city limits)
  - Maplebrook Elementary School (within the limited purpose city limits)
  - Shadow Forest Elementary School (Kingwood)
  - Summerwood Elementary School (within the limited purpose city limits)
  - Willow Creek Elementary School (Kingwood)
  - Woodland Hills Elementary School (Kingwood)
- Katy Independent School District
  - Maurice L. Wolfe Elementary School
- Pasadena Independent School District
  - Dobie High School
  - Beverly Hills Intermediate School
  - Thompson Intermediate School
  - Earnesteen Milstead Middle School
  - Morris Middle School (formerly Morris Fifth Grade Center)
  - Rick Schneider Middle School
  - Atkinson Elementary School
  - John H. Burnett Elementary School
  - Laura Welch Bush Elementary School
  - Robert Bevis Frazier Elementary School
  - A.B. Freeman Elementary School
  - Garfield Elementary School
  - Genoa Elementary School
  - Charles D. Jessup Elementary School
  - Meador Elementary School
  - Richard H. Moore Elementary School
  - Stuchbery Elementary School

=== County-operated schools ===
In addition the Harris County Department of Education, which is not classified as a school district under Texas law, operates HCDE Academic and Behavior Schools with two campuses in Houston, East and West. They were previously known as Adaptive Behavior Centers (ABC). As of 2001 all school districts in the county may send students to these schools.

=== State-chartered charter schools ===
Charter school organizations

- Harmony Public Schools
- KIPP Texas Public Schools
- The Varnett Public School
- YES Prep Public Schools

Individual schools

- Amigos Por Vida Friends For Life Charter School
- Juan B. Galaviz Charter School
- Houston Heights High School
- George I. Sanchez Charter Schools
- SER-Niños Charter School
- Raul Yzaguirre School for Success

Defunct

- Benji's Special Educational Academy (merged into Victory Prep)
- Girls and Boys Preparatory Academy
- High School for Business and Economic Success, became an HISD charter named Leader's Academy High School for Business and Academic Success in 2007 and later merged into Victory Prep
- Medical Center Charter School, a pre-kindergarten through 5th grade charter school, was located in the Westbury area. Despite its name, the school was not located in the Texas Medical Center area. Medical Center Charter School opened in 1996, and catered to employees working in the Medical Center and had the Montessori method, used until grade two. Its specialty as of 2003 was foreign languages. In 2014, the Texas Education Agency (TEA) announced that the school's performance was insufficient and that it sought to revoke its charter. By 2018, its charter had closed.
- University of Houston Charter School
- Victory Preparatory Academy (became an HISD charter in 2016, closed in 2018)

== Private schools ==
=== Secular private schools ===
- Awty International School (French School of Houston)
- The Briarwood School
- Lycée International de Houston - Designated as a French overseas school by the AEFE.
- Memorial Private High School
- The Monarch School
- The Parish School
- The Post Oak School (has one campus in Houston)
- The Rainard School
- School of the Woods (partially in Houston)
- St. John's School
- Houston Sudbury School
- The Tenney School
- The Village School
- Robindell Private School (Kindergarten and grade 1) - In Gulfton
- Trafton Academy (K-8) - In Willowbend, Opened in 1973
- Melinda Webb School (infants to 7 years old) - Located in the Texas Medical Center, it is operated by the Center for Hearing and Speech and was previously at 3636 W. Dallas. The school serves as a day school for children not yet mainstreamed into regular classrooms and a speech and therapy center for those that are. Previously known as the Houston School for Deaf Children, it was given its current name, after a deaf girl, in 1997. The girl died of leukemia circa 1958; a former student of the school, she had been the first area deaf child to be mainstreamed into a public school, as she began attending one in Texas City in 1954. Her father, Frank Webb, donated $1 million to what became the Melinda Webb School in 2002. That year its enrollment was 35–40. In 2020 it began admitting preschool students without hearing difficulties to provide a more mainstream environment.

Schools formerly in the Houston city limits which have since moved outside of the city limits

- British International School of Houston (now in unincorporated Harris County)
- The Kinkaid School (now in Piney Point Village)

=== Religious private schools ===
Roman Catholic

- Cristo Rey Jesuit College Preparatory of Houston
- Incarnate Word Academy (Girls only)
- Saint Agnes Academy (Girls only)
- St. Pius X High School
- St. Thomas High School (Boys only)
- Strake Jesuit College Preparatory (Boys only)
- John Paul II Catholic School
- Our Lady of Guadalupe School
- The Regis School of the Sacred Heart (boys only)

Protestant Christian

- Christian Life Center Academy
- Concordia Lutheran High School
- The Covenant Preparatory School
- Highlands Latin School, a private K-12 Christian School, is in Meyerland Section 3. The campus previously housed Pilgrim Lutheran School, a private K-8 Christian School, which later closed its K-8 section and now only has early childhood.
- Lutheran High School North (Texas)
- Lutheran South Academy
- Second Baptist School
- St. Francis Episcopal School (one campus is in Houston)
- St. Stephen's Episcopal School
- St. Thomas Episcopal School
- Westbury Christian School
- Yellowstone Academy
- St. Nicholas School (K-8) is an Anglican school. In 1987 the school was established, and in 1993 it opened the Saint Nicholas School II campus in the Texas Medical Center. As of 2020 residents of apartment complexes make up about 25% of the parents of the students, and the school rents from Bethany United Methodist Church. It will later occupy a new development on a 47-acre (19 ha) property along South Main Street, in the 5 Corners District.

Greek Orthodox

- Annunciation Orthodox School

Jewish

- Robert M. Beren Academy
- The Emery/Weiner School
- Torah Day School of Houston
- Beth Yeshurun Day School
- Shlenker School

Muslim

- Al-Hadi School of Accelerative Learning
- Iman Academy
- Islamic Education Institute of Texas (Darul Arqam Schools) - the Spring Branch campus, Southeast Campus, and Southwest Campus, all K-8 schools, are in the Houston city limits Its high school in north Harris County is outside of the city limits.

Defunct

- Mount Carmel High School
- North Houston Baptist School
- Pilgrim Lutheran School (K-8), in Meyerland, Houston It now only has early childhood as its K-8 section closed, with Highlands Latin School occupying the space.

== See also ==
- Education in Houston
- List of schools in Harris County, Texas
- List of state-chartered charter schools in Greater Houston
