= Tiza =

Tiza may refer to:

== People ==
- Tiza Mafira, Indonesian environmental activist

== Places ==
- La Tiza, Panama
- Tiza, Boumerdès, Algeria

== Other ==
- Tarek ibn Ziyad Academy, United States
