= River Oaks Academy =

Private school in Texas, United States

Coordinates: 29.728479°N 95.563192°W

Location
- 10600 Richmond Avenue; Houston, Texas 77042

Information
- Religious affiliation: Nonsectarian
- Established: 1988; 38 years ago
- Locale: Urban
- CEEB code: 440440
- NCES School ID: BB912535
- Teaching staff: 11.0 (FTE)
- Grades: K-12
- Gender: Coeducational
- Enrollment: 38 (2023-2024)
  - Grade 3: 1
  - Grade 5: 2
  - Grade 6: 3
  - Grade 7: 6
  - Grade 8: 4
  - Grade 9: 3
  - Grade 10: 4
  - Grade 11: 9
  - Grade 12: 6
- Student to teacher ratio: 3.5
- Hours in school day: 8
- Website: riveroaksacademy.com

River Oaks Academy is a private school at 10600 Richmond Avenue in the Westchase district of Houston, Texas, United States. The school covers grades Kindergarten through 12.

== History ==
The school opened in 1988.

In the 1990s, after voters rejected a Houston Independent School District $390 million bond package, superintendent Rod Paige contracted with River Oaks Academy, the Varnett School, and Wonderland School to house 250 students who could not be placed in HISD schools. The schools were paid $3,565 per student. This was 10% lower than the district's own per pupil cost.
