= JBG =

JBG may refer to:

- James Bond girl
- JBG Smith, an American real estate investment trust
- JBIG, an image compression format
- Jerusalem Botanical Gardens
- Juan B. Galaviz Charter School in Houston, Texas, United States
- Jung, brutal, gutaussehend, a musical album (2009)
