= List of state-chartered charter schools in Greater Houston =

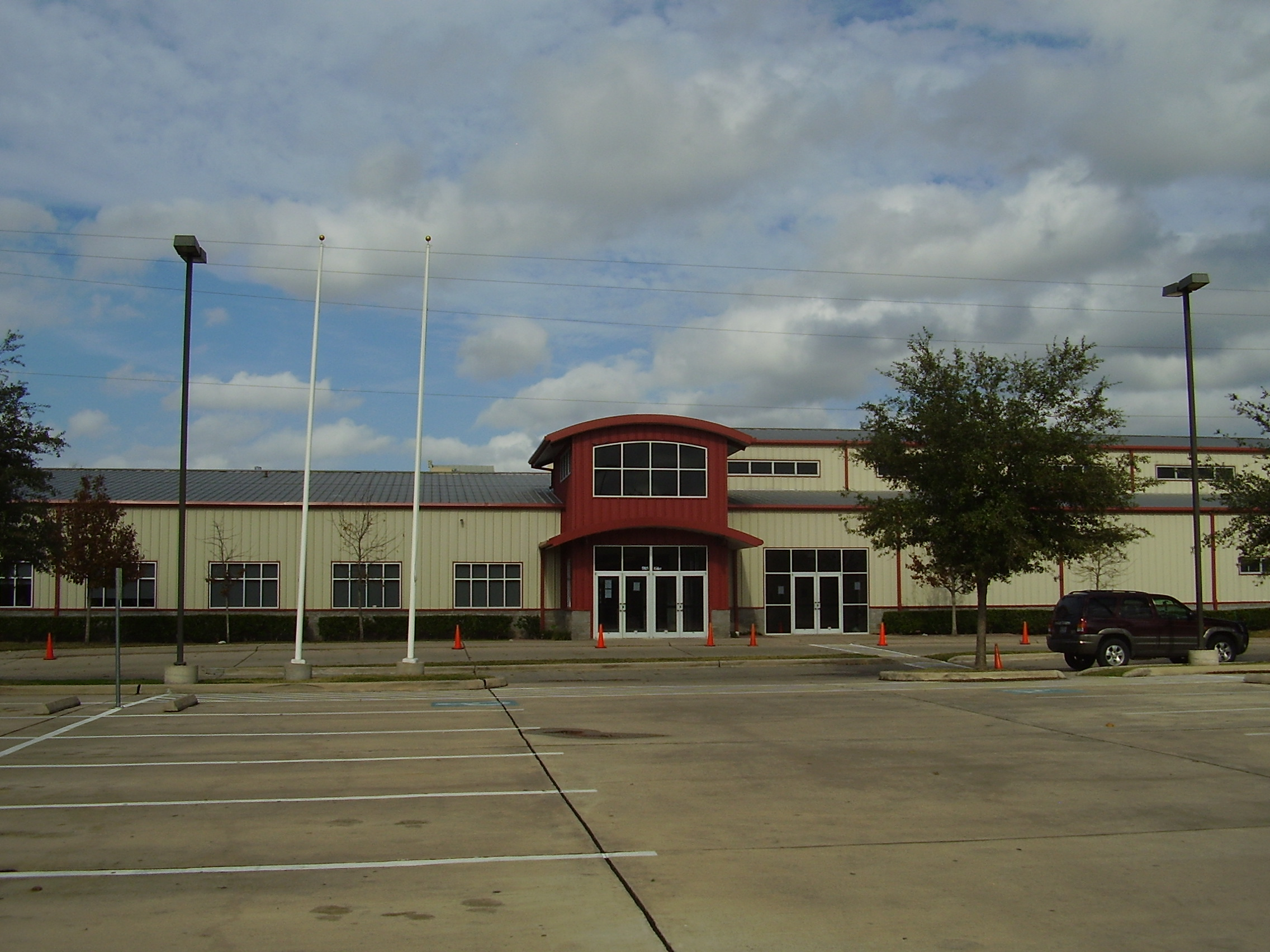
SER-Niños Charter School

This is a list of charter schools in Greater Houston directly administered by the Texas Education Agency (TEA). This list does not include charter schools administered by local school districts such as Houston ISD and Spring Branch ISD.

== List of charter schools in the city limits of Houston ==
=== School Systems ===
- Harmony Public Schools
- KIPP Texas schools in Houston
- YES Prep Public Schools

=== K-12 schools ===
- Academy of Accelerated Learning and
- Houston Alternative Preparatory Charter School
- Raul Yzaguirre School for Success

=== 3-12 schools ===
- Pro-Vision Academy

=== 6-12 schools ===
- Alphonso Crutch Life Support Center Charter School
- YES Prep Southeast, home of the Wizards(1998)
- YES Prep North Central, home of the Trailblazers(2003)
- YES Prep Southwest, home of the Mavericks(2004)
- YES Prep East End, home of the Explorers(2006)
- YES Prep Gulfton, home of the Force(2007)
- YES Prep Bray Oaks, home of the Cavaliers(2009)
- YES Prep West, home of the Marvels(2009)
- YES Prep North Forest, home of the Legends(2010)
- YES Prep Fifth Ward, home of the Titans(2011)
- YES Prep Northside, home of the Pride(2011)
- YES Prep White Oak, home of the Owls(2013)

6-10

- YES Prep Southside, home of the Giants(2015)

6-8

- YES Prep Northbrook Middle School, home of the Knights(2012)
- YES Prep Hoffman, home of the Hornets(2013)
- YES Prep Northline, home of the Revolutionaries(2017)

6-7

- YES Prep Northwest, home of the Hawks(2018)

6

- YES Prep Hobby, home of the Aviators(2019)

=== 9-12 schools ===
- Juan B. Galaviz Charter School
- YES Prep Northbrook High School, home of the Raiders(2015)
- YES Prep Eisenhower, home of the Eagles(2016)

9-10

- KIPP CONNECT High School(2018)

=== PreK-8 schools ===
- Amigos Por Vida Friends For Life Charter School
- Brazos School for Inquiry & Creativity Gano Street
- Brazos School for Inquiry & Creativity York Street
- Diversity, Roots, and Wings Academy
- SER-Niños Charter School

=== K-8 schools ===
- Houston Gateway Academy

=== 5-8 schools ===
- KIPP Academy Middle School, (Houston), home of the Bulldogs(1994)
- KIPP 3D Academy, home of the Tigers(2001)
- KIPP Spirit College Prep(2006)
- KIPP Liberation College Preparatory Middle School, home of the Eagles(2006)
- KIPP Sharpstown College Prep Middle School, home of the Phoenix(2007)
- KIPP Polaris Academy For Boys, home of the Panthers(2007)
- KIPP Intrepid Preparatory, home of the Lions(2008)
- KIPP Voyage Academy For Girls(2009)
- KIPP Courage College Prep, home of the Lions(2012)
- KIPP CONNECT Middle School(2014)
- KIPP Academy West Middle School(2015)
- KIPP Prime College Preparatory(2016)

5-7

- KIPP NEXUS Middle School, home of the Bobcats(2017)

5

- KIPP Journey Collegiate(2019)

=== PreK-7 schools ===
- Children First Academy of Houston

=== Secondary schools ===
==== High schools ====
- Crossroads Community Education Center
- Houston Can! Academy Charter School, home of the Bulldogs
- Houston Can! Academy Hobby
- Houston Heights High School, home of the Panthers
- KIPP Houston High School, home of the Kerberos (2004)
- North Houston High School for Business
- George I. Sanchez High School, home of the Eagles
- KIPP Sunnyside High School, home of the Senators(2010)
- KIPP Generations Collegiate, home of the Jaguars(2011)
- KIPP Northeast College Preparatory, home of the Navigators(2013)

=== Primary schools ===
PreK-6

- Brazos School for Inquiry & Creativity Rosslyn
- Sam Houston State University Charter School Brighton Academy

PreK-5

- Houston Heights Learning Academy
- The Varnett School East
- The Varnett School Northeast
- The Varnett School Southwest
- Sam Houston State University Charter School Cypress Trails
- Sam Houston State University Charter School Greengate Academy

K-5

- Meyerpark Elementary School
- Ripley's House Charter School
- University of Houston Charter School (closing 2021)

PreK-4

- KIPP SHINE Preparatory School(2004)
- KIPP DREAM Preparatory School(2006)
- KIPP SHARP College Prep, home of the Kangaroos(2008)
- KIPP ZENITH Academy (2009)
- KIPP Explore Academy(2009)
- KIPP Legacy Preparatory School, home of the Trailblazers(2010)
- KIPP PEACE Elementary School(2011)
- KIPP CONNECT Primary School(2014)
- KIPP Unity Primary School(2015)

K-3rd

- KIPP Climb Academy(2016)

K-2nd

- KIPP NEXUS Primary School, home of the Bobcats(2017)
- Sam Houston State University Charter School Spring Woods

K

- KIPP Journey Primary (2019)

== List of charter schools near the city of Houston ==
=== Secondary schools (outside city limits) ===
==== High schools (outside city limits) ====
- Richard Milburn Academy (Unincorporated Harris County) * Richard Milburn Academy Pasadena (Unincorporated Harris County)

=== 6-12 schools (outside city limits) ===
- Yes North Central, home of the Trailblazers (2003) (Unincorporated Harris County)
- Yes Prep Southwest, home of the Mavericks (2004)
- YES Southeast, home of the Wizards (1998)

=== K-12 schools (outside city limits) ===
- Aristoi Classical Academy (formerly West Houston Charter School) (Katy) and (K-12)

== List of formerly-operated schools ==
- Bay Area Charter School (opened 1998, TEA sought closure in 2014) - In 2014 it had 758 students divided among three campuses in El Lago and League City. In a three year period to 2014 the state gave the school a failing academic ranking.
- Benji's Academy Charter School
- Girls and Boys Preparatory Academy
- Impact Charter School
- Jamie's House Charter School (Unincorporated Harris County)
- Koinonia Community Learning Academy
- Life's Beautiful Educational Centers Inc. (closed 1999) - It operated H.O.P.E. in northeast Houston. Intended for African-American students encountering issues at traditional public schools, it was established by Sylvia L. Terry. The founder, who had campaigned for teacher's unions, was dead by 1999, and the corporation dissolved in 1999 after attempts of the four schools to become independent. Bill Outlaw of the TEA stated that he did not find any proof that the school improperly spent money. Stuart Eskenazi, using it as an example of early charter operators encountering difficulty with managing school finances, wrote in the Houston Press that "Life's Beautiful appears to have made honest accounting mistakes. Still, it demonstrates the operator's appalling lack of financial sense and savvy."
- Northwest Preparatory Academy (opened 1998, TEA sought closure in 2014) - In 2014 it had 300 students, and at the time it had two campuses. In a two year period to 2014 the state gave the school a failing academic ranking, and the state deemed its 2011 and 2013 finances substandard.
- 7-12 schools
  - Leader's Academy High School for Business and Academic Success (formerly Gulf Shores Academy)
  - Victory Preparatory Academy (was state charter for a period)
- K-8 schools
  - Medical Center Charter School - In opened in 1996, and catered to employees working in the Texas Medical Center and had the Montessori method, used until grade two. Its specialty as of 2003 was foreign languages. Medical Center Charter School was located in the Westbury area. Despite its name, the school is not located in the Texas Medical Center area. In 2014, the TEA announced that the school's performance was insufficient and that it sought to revoke its charter. By 2018, its charter had closed.

== See also ==
- List of schools in Houston - Includes portions of Houston in Harris, Fort Bend, and Montgomery counties
- List of schools in Harris County, Texas
