= North Houston Baptist School =

Coordinates: 29.8698°N 95.4001°W

North Houston Baptist School (NHBS) was a Baptist private school in Houston, Texas, and a ministry of North Houston Baptist Church, in operation from 1972-2011.

It served elementary school through senior high school. The church and school were previously at 125 West Little York Road, and later were at a temporary location at the Iglesia Bautista Fundamental del Norte de Houston at 706 Cather; the building was previously dedicated to the church's Spanish language ministry.

== See also ==
- List of schools in Houston
- List of schools in Harris County, Texas
