= Hellenic Classical Charter School =

Coordinates: 40°39′46.5″N 73°59′31.5″W

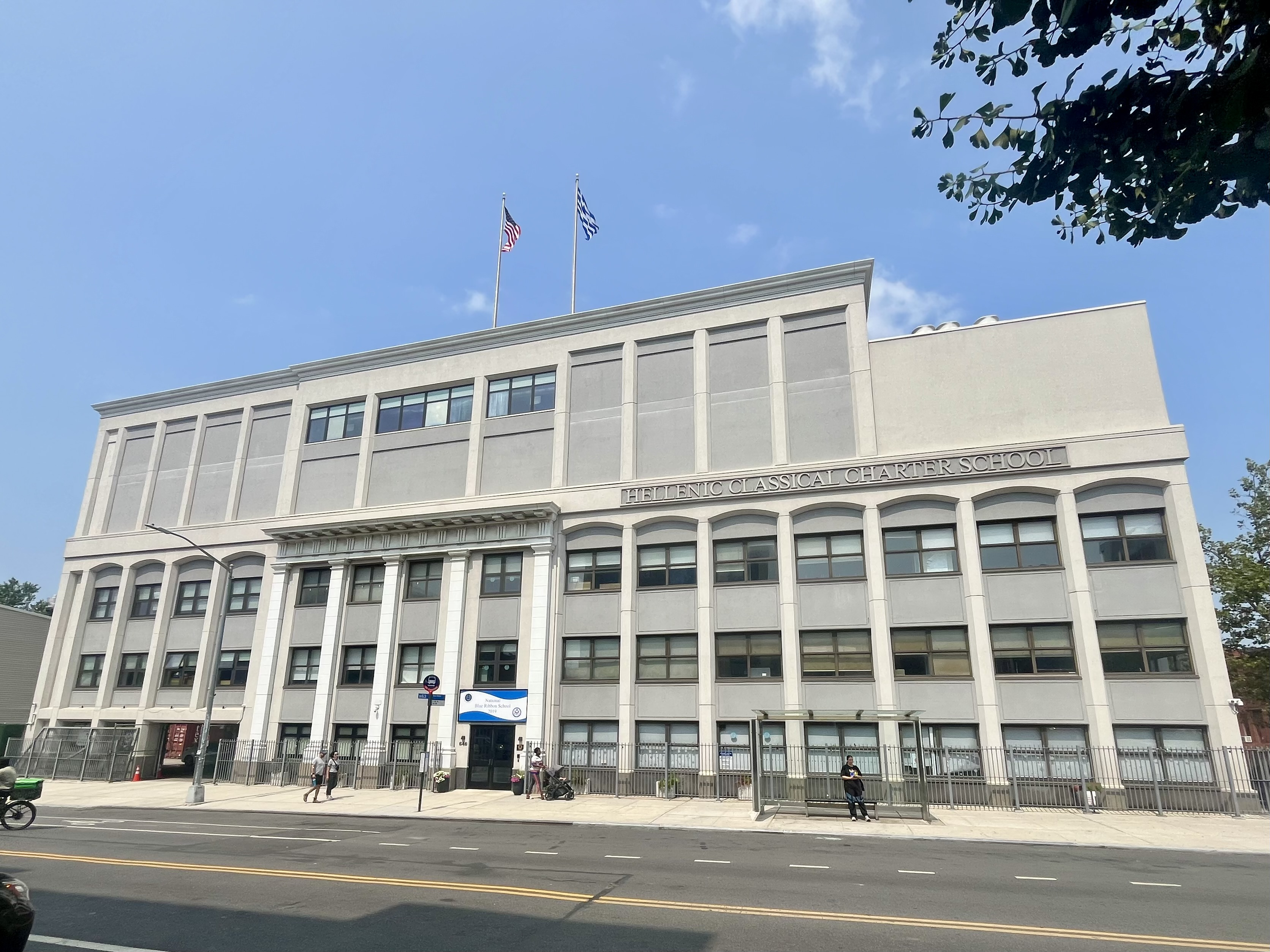
The school in 2025

The Hellenic Classical Charter School is a Brooklyn, New York City Ethnic-culture based charter school that focuses on the "classical study of the Greek and Latin languages, as well as history, art, and other cultural studies.”

== Overview ==
The modern Greek language is part of the curriculum. Funding from Greece directly pays the salaries of five teachers, a donation worth $275,000 in 2007, and a Greek minister of education helps develop the curriculum.

The school shares a building with a Greek parochial school, Soterios Ellenas. A number of students and teachers who had attended or taught at the parochial school transferred to the charter school when it opened. Father Damaskinos Ganas, the priest of Soterios Ellenas, has no formal relationship with Hellenic, but educators there refer to him as Hellenic's "spiritual leader."

== See also ==
- Ethnic-culture based charter school
