= Language/culture-based charter school =

A language/culture-based charter school is a charter school whose curriculum is based on the language and culture of a specific ethnic nation or group of nations, although the schools are open to students of all ethnic backgrounds.

A review by the Washington advocacy group, National Alliance for Public Charter Schools, found that among the more than 4,600 charters nationwide, 113 have mission statements specifying such ethnic cultural themes. These include the Amber Charter School in the Harlem neighborhood of Manhattan, the Eugenio Maria de Hostos Charter School in Rochester, New York, both of which feature instruction in Spanish and in Hispanic cultures, the Ben Gamla Charter School, the country’s first Hebrew language charter school, which opened in Hollywood, Florida, in 2007, the Tarek ibn Ziyad Academy, the Pioneer Valley Chinese Immersion Charter School, where by grade six all subjects except English language arts will be taught in Chinese, and the Hellenic Classical Charter School in Brooklyn, New York.

A language/culture-based charter school is similar in many respects to a religious charter school. Lawrence D. Weinberg, in his book Religious Charter Schools: Legalities and Practicalities, argues that a charter school can be religious in many ways and that charter schools may accommodate religious beliefs, but not endorse religious beliefs. Religious charter schools would include Catholic schools that converted to charters as happened in Washington, D.C. and some Hebrew or Arabic language schools.

== Schools ==
- Massachusetts
  - Pioneer Valley Chinese Immersion Charter School
- Minnesota
  - Hmong College Prep Academy
  - Tarek ibn Ziyad Academy
- New York
  - Amber Charter School
  - Hellenic Classical Charter School
  - Eugenio Maria de Hostos Charter School
- Pennsylvania
  - Folk Arts-Cultural Treasures Charter School
- Texas
  - Amigos Por Vida Friends for Life Charter School
  - SER-Niños Charter School
- Wisconsin
  - Hmong American Peace Academy
