= Tiza Mafira =

Indonesian environmental lawyer

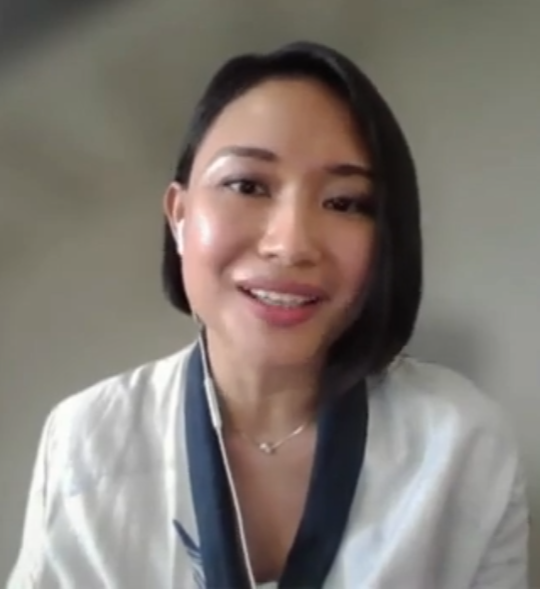
- In a Lowy Institute online discussion in 2022
- Born: Jakarta, Indonesia
- Occupation: Environmental activist
- Employer: Climate Policy Initiative
- Known for: Environmental policy, Indonesia's "Plastic Bag Diet" campaign

Tiza Mafira is an environmental activist from Jakarta, Indonesia. She initiated the paid plastic bag policy enforced in supermarkets throughout Indonesia, and the Indonesia Plastic Bag Diet Movement with various organizations to raise awareness of the harms of single-use plastic bags. Mafira received the Ocean Heroes Award from the UN Environment.

== Education ==
Mafira holds a bachelor of laws from the University of Indonesia, where she majored in International Law. After that, she pursued a master of laws at Harvard University, specializing in Corporate Law, Climate Change, Carbon Trading.

== Career ==
Mafira worked as a corporate lawyer for six years at the Makarim & Taira S. law firm, in natural resources and forestry law, before switching to environmental policy.

She joined the Climate Policy Initiative in 2014 as an Associate Director, based in Indonesia She is also the executive director of the Indonesia Plastic Bag Diet Campaign. Mafira is as a guest lecturer at Pelita Harapan University in Trade, Environment, and Climate Change.

Mafira became one of five environmental activist figures from five countries (Indonesia, India, United Kingdom, Thailand and the United States) who received the Ocean Heroes award from the United Nations Environment Programme on 8 June 2018.

== Campaigns ==
Concerned with the increasing use of plastic, Mafira started the Indonesia Plastic Bag Diet campaign in October 2010. This campaign invited the public to start reducing the use of plastic bags, by bringing their own shopping bags or reusing plastic bags. The campaign is worked with a retailer in 6 major cities, which ultimately can reduce 8,233,930 pieces of plastic bags and can collect voluntary funds from consumers of 117 million rupiah for city cleaning activities from plastic bags in Bogor, Yogyakarta, Surabaya and Bali.

Mafira believes that policies are needed to promote large-scale lifestyle changes regarding the use of plastic bags.

In early 2013, Mafira together with organizations activating plastic bag issues such as Change.org, Ciliwung Institute, Earth Hour Indonesia, Greeneration Indonesia, Leaf Plus, Indorelawan, Si Dalang, The Body Shop, and several individual representatives initiated a joint national movement called the Indonesia Plastic Bag Diet Movement (Gerakan Indonesia Diet Kantong Plastik, or GIDKP). The aim of the collaboration is to increase the participation of the Indonesian people at individual and institutional levels, and to unify the impact of the entire campaign. That same year, Mafira created a "Pay for Plastic Bag" petition asking traders and retailers to stop giving out free plastic bags, which was signed by 70,000 people.

The trial of the paid plastic bag policy came into effect on 21 February 2016 in 23 cities across Indonesia. As a result, there was an 80 percent decrease in the use of plastic bags. However, the trial did not last long, as many parties disagreed with the implementation of the policy. Some retailers expressed concerns that customers would leave if free bags were not provided. Additionally, plastic producers worried that bans on single-use plastics would lead to job losses and other economic impacts; Mafira says that a demand for reusables could help support the economy through local crafts. Although many do not agree with this enforcement, the Indonesian government supports the policy on plastic bag use.

Mafira also leads the "Plastic Bag Robbery" campaign, where organized volunteers approach people on the street and offer to exchange their plastic bags for reusable ones, with the interaction providing an opportunity to raise awareness and educate the public.
