= Girls and Boys Preparatory Academy =

Location
- 8282 Bissonnet Street, Suite 125; Houston, Texas 77074; United States; 29.679281°N 95.525404°W

Information
- Type: Charter school
- Opened: 1995
- Status: Permanently closed
- Closed: 2015
- Grades: K-12
- Enrollment: 758 (2014-2015)
- Website: gbprep.com at the Wayback Machine (archive index)

Girls and Boys Preparatory Academy (GBPA) was a K-12 state-chartered primary and secondary school located in Greater Sharpstown, Houston, Texas. It operated from 1995, making it one of the first Texas charter schools, to 2015.

== History ==
The school received its operating charter in 1995. It was one of the first 19 charter schools to ever open in the State of Texas.

According to an article of the African-American News and Issues, Carroll Salley, a former employee of the Houston Independent School District (HISD), opened the school because she did not like how African-American students were treated in that district. Initially it had high school grades only but later added earlier grades. It catered to students classified as "at risk". Kimya McKinney, the daughter of Salley, at one point became the school principal.

In 1996, the school opened in a three-story office building. Soon after the opening, the school administrators learned that they needed to spend $30,000 so the building was in compliance with City of Houston fire codes. In 1997 the school offered Arabic, French, Spanish, and Swahili.

Up to July 2007 several teachers never received certification to teach. In 2007 the school board began efforts to ensure all teachers were certified. It also, in July of that year, hired Victoria Dunn as superintendent. This began a power struggle within the school community. Dunn removed McKinney from her position circa January 2008.

In 2008 the Texas Education Agency (TEA) ranked the school "academically unacceptable." In 2011 the school had a 50% graduation rate.

At the end of the school's life, it was fully K-12. In 2014 the system had 758 students.

=== Closure ===
According to Texas Education Agency (TEA) spokesperson Debbie Ratcliffe, the charter school establishment process was, in 1995, simpler and less arduous compared to the 2015 process, and that therefore many of the earlier charter schools did not have the foundation to ultimately survive. Margaret Downing of the Houston Press wrote that establishing a charter school is "an ambitious enterprise for anyone" and that since the TEA inspectors meant to oversee the school were "overburdened", the school "didn’t even get the minimal oversight a school chartered to a local school district would get — little attention was being paid to the school as matters continued to spiral out of control."

The school's final president of the school's board of directors, Peter Clark, stated that the school had $600,000 in debt in March 2014. Margaret Downing of the Houston Press stated that "According to some" the school destroyed its financial stability by trying to purchase property, as it was trying to avoid significant expenses in renting property.

In December 2014, the TEA announced that the school's performance was insufficient, with a failing academic grade in the 2012–2013 school year, and that it had insufficient financial performance levels in the 2011-2012 and 2013-2014 school years. The agency sought to revoke its charter, and even though the school administration attempted to relieve itself of the debt in attempt to ward off the order, the TEA announced that its revocation was permanent. Ratcliffe stated that the school frequently faced financial problems and instability, and that the agency had on two occasions each attempted to correct it with conservators and monitors, respectively. Of the Houston-area charters the TEA was seeking to close that year, Girls and Boys was the largest. In August 2015 the school owed $157,835 in interest and back taxes from the Internal Revenue Service (IRS); The school system closed in August 2015; area parents stated that school officials had promised that the school would still continue, but it ultimately did not.

Creditors filed lawsuits against the school upon the closure. The mid-September 2015 balance owed to the IRS was down to $7,148, as Clark stated that the IRS reduced the money owed. Downing concluded that GBPA "ultimately sank under the weight of those ambitions in a manner both very public and profound".

== Campuses ==
In 2014 it had three campuses. 8282 Bissonnet Street was the address of the primary campus. One of its other campuses was 8415 West Bellfort. Its campuses were in Brays Oaks and Sharpstown. 11851 South Gessner was to be the school's new campus. In its lifetime the school frequently switched locations.

== Curriculum ==
The school did not get a standard curriculum until 2008, when the board of directors adopted the one based on that of the Fort Bend Independent School District (FBISD).

== Demographics ==
Its peak population was 750. In 2012 85% of the students were black and fewer than 13% were Hispanic or Latino. Of the peak population, 90% were classified as economically disadvantaged as they were signed up for free or reduced lunches.

In 1997 the school had about 350 students in grades 6 through 12. Most of them were African American.

== See also ==
- List of state-chartered charter schools in Houston
- List of schools in Harris County, Texas
