= The Varnett Public School =

Public charter school in Houston, Texas

Coordinates: 29°39′23″N 95°27′59″W

Information
- Type: Title 1 charter school
- Established: 1984
- Grades: Pre-k–5th grade
- Accreditations: Texas Education Agency and Southern Association of Colleges and Schools
- Website: varnett.org

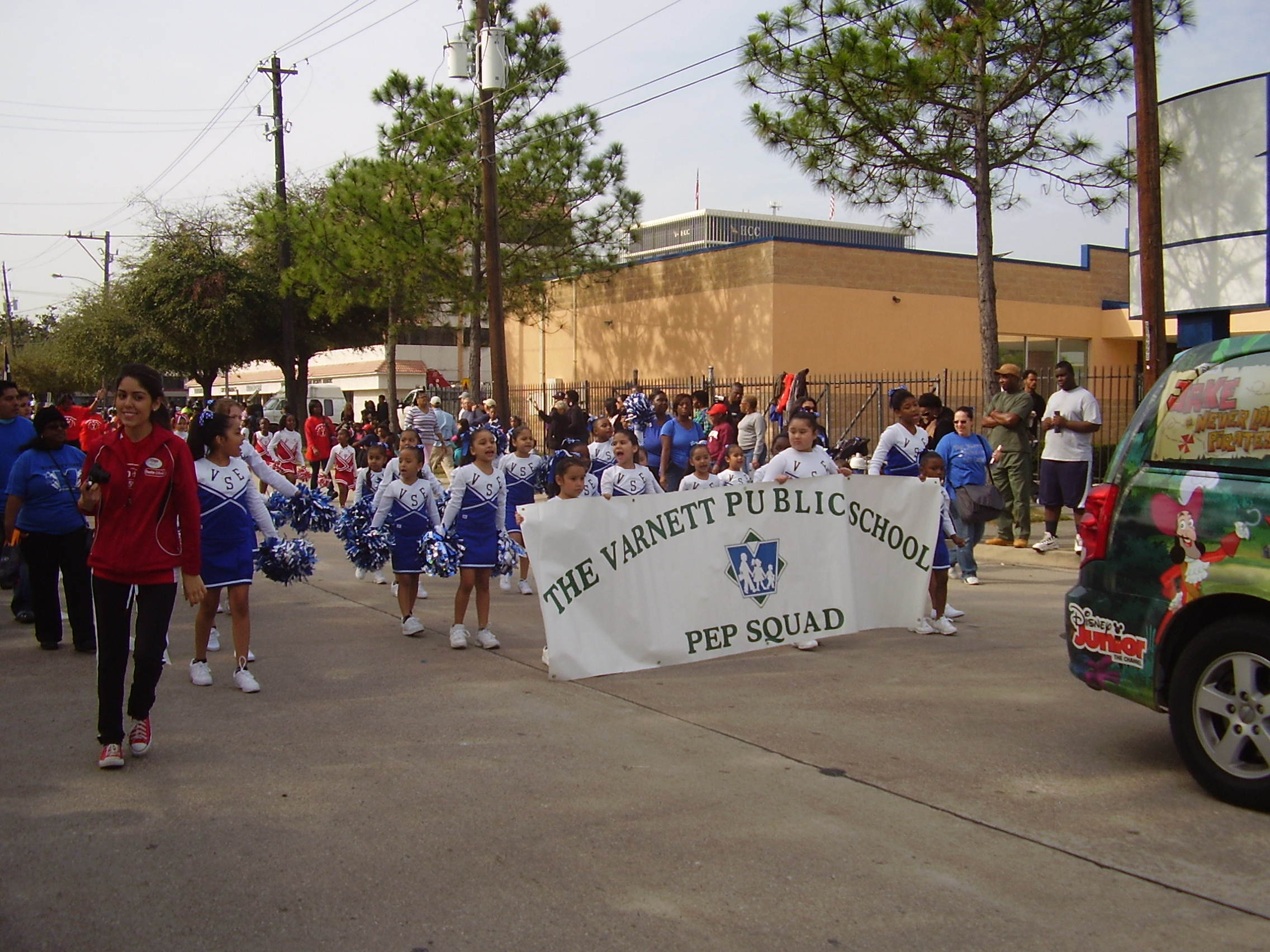
Varnett Public School Pep Squad at the 2013 MLK day parade

The Varnett Public School is a state charter school network headquartered in the Varnett School Southwest Campus in Houston, Texas. The system has four campuses with more than 1,600 students. The school was founded as a private school in 1984 and became a public charter school in 1998.

In 2015 Ericka Mellon of the Houston Chronicle wrote that the school system "was a standout among schools serving mostly poor, minority children." That year the founders of the school were indicted by federal prosecutors, accused of embezzling $2.6 million of school funds. They pleaded guilty, and sentenced to prison in 2018.

== History ==
The Varnett School opened in 1984. Dr. Marian Annette Cluff and her husband, Alsie Cluff Jr., started the school, then a private school, so they could give their son, then in preschool, a better education. Annette Cluff served as the owner of the school system.

In the 1990s, after voters rejected a Houston Independent School District $390 million bond package, superintendent Rod Paige contracted with Varnett, River Oaks Academy, and Wonderland School to house 250 students who could not be placed in HISD schools. The schools were paid $3,565 per student. This was 10% lower than the district's own per pupil cost. In 1998 Varnett received its open enrollment charter from the state, and it converted into a public state charter school.

In 2004 The Varnett School appointed Ronique Bastine-Robinson, a municipal judge of Stafford, Texas, to its board of directors.

In 2007 Harold Dutton, a member of the Texas House of Representatives, sponsored a resolution that honored Annette Cluff for winning the service award Audrey Lawson Impact Award.

In 2009 Varnett had three campuses with over 1,400 students in grades pre-Kindergarten through 5. In 2010 Varnett the three campuses had 1,700 students. During that year 300 or 400 children were on a waiting list. In 2010 the East Campus won the National Blue Ribbon Award.

At one time Annette Cluff won the Pinnacle Award, an award from the Houston Citizens Chamber of Commerce which honors African American entrepreneurs.

In 2012 1,730 students attended Varnett schools. That year a spokesperson of the Texas Education Agency (TEA) stated that the agency was investigating issues at the Varnett School system and in the Rhodes charter school system. Since March 2012, during a review of issues not specified, the TEA withheld the accreditation of the Varnett school system. In August 2013 the TEA released a report stating that the school system conducted business out of the view of the public, had conflicts of interest, and spent millions of dollars in manners it considered questionable. The school responded through an attorney, Rusty Hardin, stating that it did no wrongdoing.

In August 2014 the Cluff family resigned from positions related to the operations of the school. On Thursday July 16, 2015 federal prosecutors announced a 19-count indictment against Marian Annette Cluff and Alsie Cluff Jr. It accused them of embezzling $2.6 million from the school system. U.S. Attorney Ryan Patrick stated that the Cluffs charged parents and students for various privileges and used the money to fund luxury goods and services.

The Cluffs pleaded guilty in 2017. They were sentenced by Melinda Harmon, the district judge, to prison in 2018; Annette Cluff got ten years and Alsie Cluff got three years. In 2019 the U.S. Attorneys Office issued a $4.4 million restitution order. As part of that, about 4,000 families affected by the Cluffs' overbilling were to receive $110.02 per child enrolled, multiplied by the number of years each child attended the school system. The total amount of money to be paid out to the families is $604,889.79.

== Operations ==
Dr. Nita White was named superintendent in December 2022. Previously Annette Cluff served as the superintendent and campus director of the system. Her husband, Alsie Cluff Jr., was the operations manager. Alsie Cluff III the son of Annette and Alsie Jr., served as the assistant operations manager. Melissa Cluff, the daughter of Annette and Alsie Jr., is the assistant director of a kindergarten program. At one time a daughter in law of Annette and Alsie Jr. used to work for Cluff.

Varnett did business with companies owned by the Cluff family. In the 2008-2009 school year the school paid over $1.5 million to Cluff-owned businesses. The school paid $822,000 to Texas School Bus Co. Annette Cluff said that the insurance carrier for Varnett School did not permit the Varnett School to own buses, so she had to create a separate school bus company. According to Annette Cluff, the state's charter agreement, which came into effect when Varnett became a public school, allowed the practice. The school also paid $786,400 to rent buildings from the Varnett Academy Inc., a Cluff company. In Texas traditional school districts and charter schools are permitted to do business in this manner as long as the people who would directly benefit from such arrangements do not vote in the matters, and all of the requirements for bidding are satisfied.

The Texas Education Agency records state that for the 2008-2009 school year, Annette Cluff's annual salary was $252,000, while Internal Revenue Service records state that her annual salary was $372,961. TEA records state that Alsie Cluff Jr.'s annual salary was $166,800, Alsie Cluff III's annual salary was $68,900, and Melissa Cluff's annual salary was $48,000. Annette Cluff says that the individuals received high salaries because "[m]y people have to wear multiple hats" because "[w]e don't have the big administration building with lots of staff," like a traditional school district would have. As of 2012 Cluff's salary was $264,600, which would place her among the most highly paid school superintendents in the State of Texas. That year, the principal of Lamar High School in Houston, which housed two times the combined total of students in the entire Varnett system, had a salary of $127,000. Alsie Cluff Jr. had a salary of $175,166 during that school year. By 2012 the salaries of the Cluff's had increased by 32% in a three year period.

== Campuses ==
Campuses in Houston

All campuses are in the City of Houston.

- East Campus
  - In the 2009-2010 school year the school had 358 students. 98% of them qualified for free or reduced lunch.
- Northeast Campus
- Southeast Campus
- Southwest Campus
  - The Southwest Campus, in the Brays Oaks district, includes the administrative offices of the entire system. The headquarters was under construction in 2009. The headquarters houses the administrative divisions, including communications, curriculum, human resources, registration, and transportation. It also serves as a meeting space for the board of directors. The building houses a break room, a conference room, and a kitchen. Annette Cluff said that she had always envisioned having a headquarters facility built on the property of one of the campuses.

== See also ==
- List of state-operated charter schools in Houston
