= The Briarwood School (Houston, Texas) =

Private school in west Houston, Texas

Briarwood School
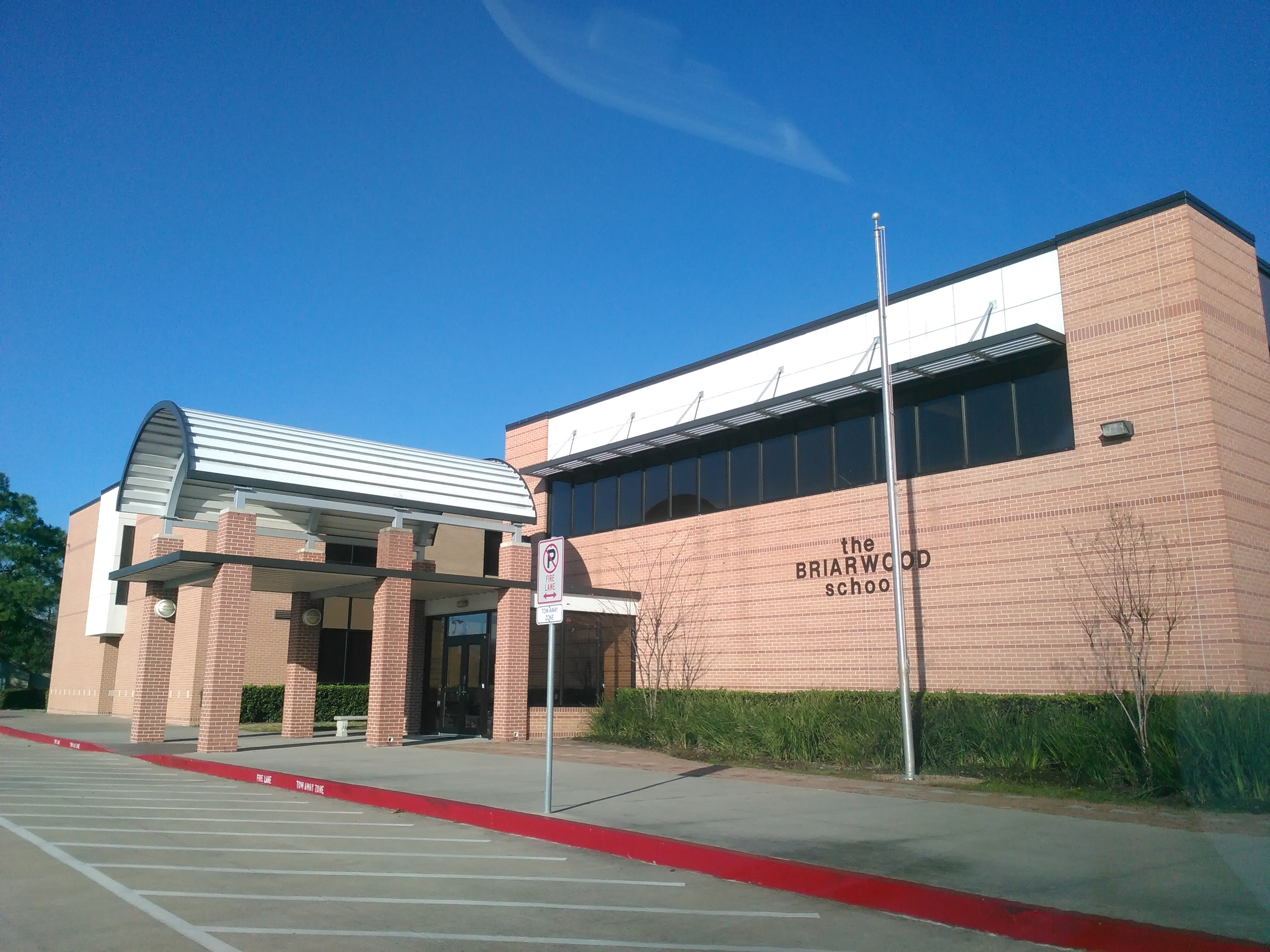
- The Briarwood School front exterior

Location
- 12207 Whittington Drive; Houston, Texas 77077-4999; 29.7472°N 95.5957°W

Information
- Type: Private
- Motto: “Every child can learn and has the right to be taught in the way that he or she learns best.”
- Founded: 1967
- Founder: Yvonne and Dave Streit
- NCES School ID: BB912602
- Head of school: Lisa Landi
- Grades: K-12
- Enrollment: 337 (2024)
- Colors: White, Blue, Gray
- Athletics conference: TAPPS
- Mascot: Mustangs
- Yearbook: Focus
- Website: www.briarwoodschool.org
- Last updated: November 9, 2026

The Briarwood School is a private school in Houston, Texas, in the Briar Forest community. Briarwood serves students with diagnosed learning disabilities, including dyslexia, dysgraphia, dyscalculia, and/or ADHD. (Note: While students with ADHD are served at Briarwood, a prospective student must also have a separate primary diagnosis of a specific learning disability as ADHD is not legally considered a learning disability under the Individuals with Disabilities Education Act (IDEA).) The school was founded by Yvonne Tuttle Streit in 1967. Streit also founded The Brookwood Community, a Christian-affiliated residential and work community for adults with intellectual and developmental disabilities located in Brookshire, Texas. Briarwood has been accredited by the Independent Schools Association of the Southwest since 2025.

== History ==
Yvonne Tuttle Streit started The Briarwood School out of necessity to educate her daughter, who developed intellectual disabilities and brain damage following complications from encephalitis and meningitis at fifteen months. She and her husband traveled across the country for doctors and resources. Eventually, Streit and three other mothers founded Briarwood in 1967, originally located at Memorial Drive Baptist Church on Piney Point Road (now home to Ecclesia Church) next to St. Francis Episcopal School. The school later shared a space with a daycare center in 1968. As of 1969, Briarwood had moved to St. Philip Presbyterian Church, 4807 San Felipe. For the 1969–70 school year, the school had a full-time enrollment of 88, totaling around 130 students. Tuition ranged from $80 to $110 monthly.

Briarwood, nationally renowned by the 1970s, moved into its current building on Whittington Drive in April 1973, although the east wing was still under construction as late as 1978. The addition was to host Briarwood's technical programs, including a greenhouse, in a campus expansion project estimated to have cost $1.85 million. Briarwood had 210 students during the 1974–75 school year, and tuition was $180 per month. By 1978, the campus building's expansion was complete, and school staff had assisted in implementing similar innovative curricula to that of Briarwood's internationally in countries such as West Germany, Mexico, and England. This coincided with the first senior graduation exercise, which took place that May. Over 300 students were enrolled in 1977–78. The two-story east wing currently houses the Middle and Upper Schools, grades 6–12.

In 1996, students at Briarwood adopted Flash, an American Bashkir Curly horse. Originating from Cheboygan, Michigan, Flash arrived in Texas that March and became the school's live mascot. Flash was the subject of a literary magazine, which included a short novel (see External links). Select academic courses included Flash and the subject of horses as part of their lesson plans, including biology, Spanish, and art. The arrival of Flash also jumpstarted Explore, an experimental learning program fostering responsibility, cooperation between different classes, self-confidence, and positive risk-taking. The “Flash Fund” was also established to create tuition scholarships.

Briarwood celebrated its 50th anniversary during the 2016–17 school year, a feat recognized by Houston news media. Renowned journalist Linda Ellerbee spoke at an event hosted by Briarwood at the Junior League of Houston on November 15, 2016. During halftime at the annual alumni basketball game on January 6, 2017, former KKBQ (93Q) personality and 2005 alumnus Al Farb read a declaration from Houston Mayor Sylvester Turner designating January 6 as Briarwood Day.

== Campus ==
Briarwood is located on Whittington Drive in west Houston, Texas, next to Ashford Elementary School. The campus building, built in 1973, is two stories tall and contains two gymnasiums, three lunch rooms, and three academic wings. An athletic field is also used for flag football, soccer, and physical education classes. Attached to the athletic field is a small tennis/pickleball complex.

== Academics ==
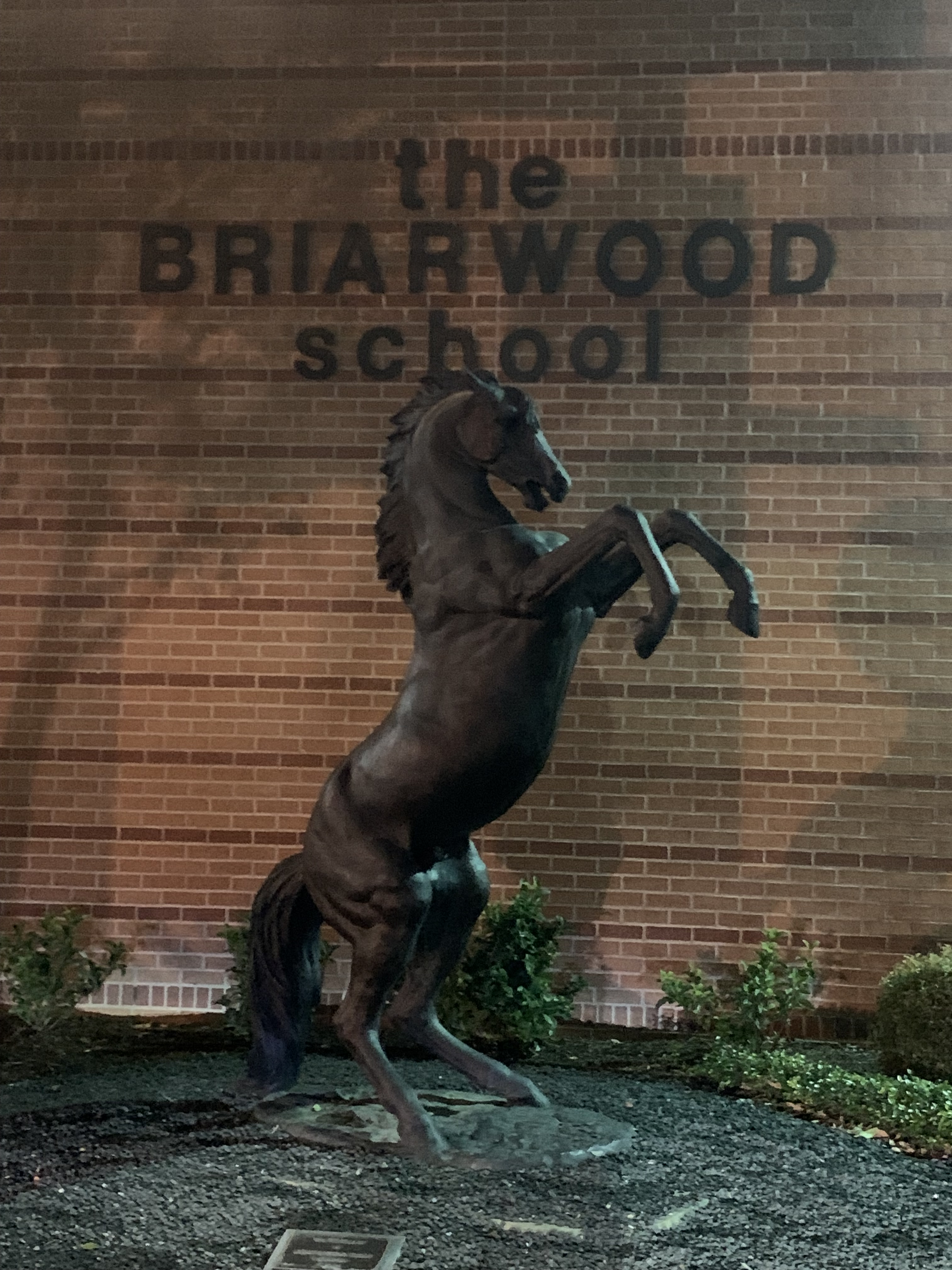
Bronze mustang statue in front of the campus

The Briarwood School utilizes academic curricula as recommended by Texas academic standards plus the addition of multiple classes unique to the school for all three divisions.

The Lower School, grades K–5, introduces core curriculum classes to students with English literature, language arts, math, history, science, art, music, and physical education classes. Unique to Briarwood's Lower School division are "Focused Intervention Time" (FIT) classes designed to help students with their academic weaknesses. These classes and programs center around reading comprehension, math, and writing interventions. Lower School also has a specialty class called Teaching Opportunities in Pragmatic Skills (TOPS). TOPS centers around building social skills, character development, bullying prevention, and understand learning disabilities.

Throughout Middle School, grades 6–8, students are exposed to a more sophisticated curriculum centering around core classes, electives, academic advisory, technology, interscholastic athletics, and student clubs. Junior high students at Briarwood are afforded elective classes for the first time, including technology-centered courses, family and consumer sciences, and theatre. Middle School is when students first receive Chromebooks.

Upper School (grades 9–12) expands on the lessons achieved throughout Middle School. High school students are given the same academic and extracurricular opportunities as junior high and then some, including public speaking, yearbook staff, and a college readiness course. One required course endemic to Briarwood is Choices: a one-semester class for freshmen which focuses solely on students' LDs. Beginning in 9th grade, Briarwood students are required to complete a designated amount of community service hours. Seniors will write an essay reflecting on these experiences which is presented at the Senior Breakfast near the end of the school year. The Assistance League of Houston, who has served Briarwood since at least 1970, annually gives out college scholarships to select Briarwood seniors. Vocational training in auto mechanics, woodworking, and drafting was offered to Middle-Upper students in the 1970s.

== School culture ==
=== Theatre ===
The Briarwood School has a full theatre and arts program highlighted by one professionally directed production every semester. Previous plays have included classics, such as Welcome to Four Way: The Town That Time Forgot, and original performances, including Broadway Comes to Briarwood, performed in November 2014.

==== Shakespearean class ====
Briarwood had an elective class revolving around William Shakespeare that was started by teacher Bob Ives in 1993. The class was a combination of traditional academics and theatre production, which prompted Ives to offer the class to all students rather than only those with more advanced language skills. Bob Ives recruited several of his past colleagues from Rice University, Alley Theatre, and Houston Community College to volunteer and help produce a full Shakespearean play in 1995. He also invited professional actors, including Corin Redgrave and a professional fighting director, to Briarwood as educational guests for the specialty class.

The production of the first play, A Midsummer Night's Dream, presented challenges. Ives' management included a "multi-sensory approach" taking into account the different learning styles of LD students, including flash cards and videos for visual learners and repetitive practice of scenes for kinesthetic learners. The students were fully involved in the play production process, including costume and set design, making and selling tickets, and cooking food as part of a dinner theatre. The play was performed in May 1996. One student brought her reading scores up by four grades as a result of the class.

=== Alumni basketball game ===
Briarwood holds the distinction of hosting its famous alumni basketball game every January. The annual event takes place between the JV and varsity boys basketball teams and a makeshift alumni team. The highly anticipated event and often close scoring outcomes create vast camaraderie for both Briarwood students and alumni.

=== Student ambassadors ===
Briarwood selects students to visit Houston-area colleges and universities, such as the University of St. Thomas and Houston Christian University, to discuss their perspectives on dyslexia and other specific learning disabilities. The school has also hosted dyslexia panels on campus, which have included former students, staff members, and school alumni. In January 2017, select students spoke at the Dyslexia Summit, an event sponsored by the Harris County Department of Education. Both the 2015 and 2017 cohorts of student ambassadors and administrators presented the 2012 documentary The Big Picture: Rethinking Dyslexia, which focuses on a dyslexic individual seeking to attend Middlebury College. The documentary also stars famous individuals with dyslexia such as David Boies, Richard Branson, Gavin Newsom, and Charles Schwab.

=== Annual Benefit ===
Briarwood hosts an annual fundraising gala during the spring referred to as the Annual Benefit. The Benefit typically includes a sit-down dinner, speakers, musical entertainment, and a silent and live auction. From its inception in 1970 until the early-2000s, the Annual Benefit was traditionally held at large Houston-area theaters, including Jones Hall and the Wortham Theater Center, and was headlined by celebrity singers or entertainers. Some celebrities who have performed for the Annual Benefit include Henry Mancini (1979), John Denver (1987), Gladys Knight (1992), and The Pointer Sisters (1999). Special patron ticket buyers were occasionally treated to an afterparty, including the 1988 Benefit with Johnny Mathis, which Ninfa Laurenzo notably attended. The Annual Benefit regularly raises six figures in donations; for example, the 2001 Benefit featuring Lou Rawls raised $600,000.

== Athletics ==
Briarwood provides an all-inclusive selection of sports for Middle and Upper Schools. The Mustangs are associated with TAPPS, competing as a 2A member, along with the Texas Christian Flag League (TCFL) for flag football. Flag football won back-to-back state championships in 2023 and 2024. Boys tennis was a small-school powerhouse in the 1990s, winning five straight state championships from 1991 to 1995.

Boys sports	Girls sports	Coed sports
Basketball	Basketball	Winter Soccer
Cross Country (9–12)	Cross Country (9–12)	
Flag Football	Golf (9–12)	
Golf (9–12)	Swimming	
Swimming	Tennis	
Tennis	Track & Field	
Track & Field	Volleyball	

=== Athletic championships ===
Championship was a TAPPS championship unless otherwise stated.

Briarwood High School Athletic Championships
Sport	Year	Source(s)
Boys Cross Country	1991 (1A), 1992 (1A)	
Boys Flag Football	2023 (TCFL), 2024 (TCFL)	
Boys Tennis	1991 (1A), 1992 (1A), 1993 (1A), 1994 (1A), 1995 (1A), 2000 (1A/2A), 2024 (1A)	
Boys Track and Field	1989 (1A), 1990 (1A)	

== Former students ==
- Woody Harrelson
- Anthony J. Nocella (1995), anarchist educator and activist
