= University of Houston Charter School =

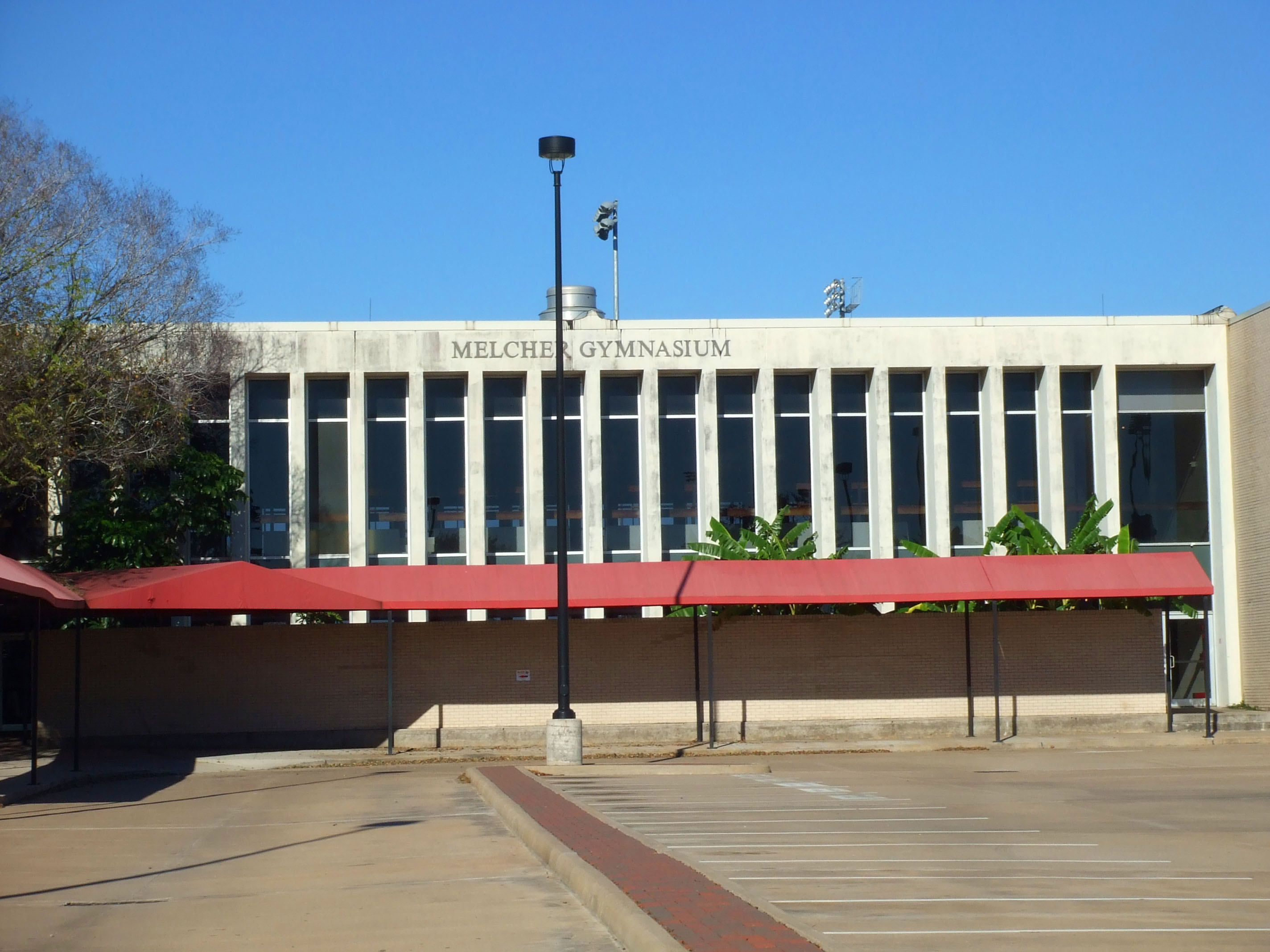
- Melcher Gymnasium, which housed the charter school offices

Location
- 3855 Holman Street; Houston, Texas 77204; United States; 29.725268°N 95.348197°W

Information
- School type: Public elementary
- Opened: 1997
- Closed: 2021
- Grades: K-5
- Gender: Coed
- Campus type: state charter school
- Website: https://uh.edu/charter-school/

University of Houston Charter School (UCHS) was a state charter primary school located in the Melcher Gymnasium 100 at 3855 Holman Street in Houston, Texas, United States. The school was operated by the University of Houston. The university operated the school in affiliation with its Human Development Laboratory School. The Texas State Board of Education chartered the school. Circa 2002, it was the only school counted by the U.S. Census Bureau as a "dependent school system" (that is, dependent on another layer of government) in Texas.

The school first opened on January 29, 1997. It was one of the nineteen schools to be granted the first school charters under Texas law. In 2007 it had almost 130 students. Historically the maximum enrollment was 138.

The education program emphasized problem solving and was known as "constructivist". The UH board annually spent $268,000 to operate the school.

In December 2020 the principal alerted parents that the board would consider whether to close the school, catching some parents off guard. That month the UH board voted to close the school due to problems with the COVID-19 pandemic in Texas and general financial problems. By December 2020 enrollment was down to 89, and the school had a shortage of employees. The charter was scheduled to expire in July 2021, when the institution would ordinarily have applied for renewal. The school was closed on July 31, 2021.

== See also ==
- List of schools in Houston
- List of state-chartered charter schools in Greater Houston
- University of Texas Elementary School
