= Jamie's House Charter School =

State charter school in Harris County, Texas, United States

Coordinates: 30.02102°N 95.45276°W

Information
- School type: Charter school
- Grades: 6-12

Jamie's House Charter School was a 6-12 state charter school in unincorporated northern Harris County, Texas.

== History ==
The Texas Education Agency (TEA) revoked accreditation on December 28, 2013 due to poor financial and/or academic performance ratings.

=== Teacher incident ===
In May 2010, a video of a teacher attacking a student was released to the public. The video, captured on April 29, 2010 shows the teacher dragging a 13-year-old male student across the floor before hitting the student. The teacher in the video, Sheri Lynn Davis (who did not have a teaching certificate), was fired and arrested. Gabriel Hahn Moseley, another teacher who witnessed the event but did not intervene, was also fired. The mother of the child filed a lawsuit against the teacher. The Texas Education Agency sent investigators to the school to conduct an investigation. The superintendent and the principal of the school, Ollie Hilliard and David Jones, were charged with failure to report child abuse, a misdemeanor. Davis was charged with felony injury, and Moseley was given misdemeanor charges. Davis pleaded "no contest." She received a five-year probation sentence and an order that she cannot work at a school during her probationary period. In June 2011, Jones and Hilliard were acquitted of the charges against them.

== See also ==
- List of state-operated charter schools in Houston
