= Aristoi Classical Academy =

Coordinates: 29.7967°N 95.8221°W

Location
- Main Campus (grades PK–4): 5618 Eleventh Street, Katy, TX 77449; Morton Road Campus (grades 5–12): 5610 Morton Rd. Katy, TX 77493

Information
- Former name: West Houston Charter School
- Type: Charter agency
- Motto: Truth, Goodness, and Beauty
- Religious affiliation: None
- Opened: 1996
- Status: Open
- Locale: Suburb
- NCES District ID: 4800019
- Superintendent: Brenda Davidson
- CEEB code: 443498
- Dean: Douglas Thompson
- Headmaster: Brenda Davidson
- Head of school: Terrence Boling; Kathryn Locheed (interim)
- Employees: 100
- Grades: K–12
- Gender: Co-educational
- Enrollment: approx. 900 (2018–19 school year)
- Student to teacher ratio: 1 to 15.49
- Education system: Classical education
- Language: English
- Schedule type: A/B Block Schedule
- Hours in school day: 7
- Campus: Lower campus (K–4); Upper campus (5–12)
- Campus type: Suburban
- Houses: Unnamed (four different houses)
- Sports: Basketball; Cross Country; Flag Football; Soccer; Volleyball; Track
- Mascot: Griffin
- Accreditation: Texas Education Agency
- Tuition: Tuition-free
- Revenue: $4,594,000
- Website: aristoiclassical.org

Aristoi Classical Academy is a K-12 open-enrollment public charter school based in Katy, Texas. The school originally opened in 1996 and was then called West Houston Charter School. The school was renamed in 2006. It has three campuses, two of which serve a portion of the Katy Independent School District area, and the remaining one the Cypress Fairbanks Independent School District area.

== History ==
Aristoi Classical Academy in Katy, Texas is a second-generation public charter school in its 23rd year of operations as of 2019. The school was originally West Houston Charter School, but by 2006 it had low enrolment. The original model focused on catering to each student's preferred learning style or styles, with different content for auditory, kinesthetic, and visual learners, respectively.

2016 STAAR test scores were good for students attending the school.

The school expanded into a new K-12 campus on Morton Road in 2016.

In May 2019, Brenda Davidson, the school's superintendent, announced Dr. Terrence O. Moore as the new Headmaster after Matthew Watson serving in the position for five years to develop the high school. On October 18, 2019, Dr. Moore “tendered his resignation” as Headmaster. Kathryn Locheed took his place as the interim Head of Upper School.

== Campus ==
Aristoi Classical Academy has two campuses. Aristoi's Main Campus (5618 Eleventh St.) houses the school's elementary grades—Kindergarten through 4th Grade. The Morton Road Campus (5610 Morton Rd.) houses 5th through 12th Grades, and the district offices.

On December 21, 2018, it was announced that Aristoi will create a campus based in Crossover Bible Fellowship as an effort expand into the Cypress-Fairbanks Independent School District area.

== Curriculum ==
Aristoi Classical Academy uses a classical curriculum.

The substance of the curriculum traces its roots to ancient Greece and Rome, the civilizations that Aristoi sees as the first to systematically explore the meaning of human existence. The school sees the literature, poetry, philosophy, and political experience of those ancient cultures serve as the foundation of Western civilization and form the basis of classical education. The classical education Aristoi employs aims to recognize “the experiences of historical peoples and societies as a rich source of wisdom for the present."

== Dress code ==
The school has a dress code.

== See also ==
- List of state-operated charter schools in Houston
- Aristoi
