= Tarek ibn Ziyad Academy =

Location
- 4100 East 66th Street; Inver Grove Heights, Minnesota, 55076; United States; 44°51′12″N 93°01′19″W

Information
- Type: Charter School
- Principal: Asad Zaman
- Staff: 9
- Faculty: 38
- Grades: K-8
- Enrollment: 300
- Affiliation: Islamic Relief USA
- Website: Tarek ibn Ziyad Academy

Tarek ibn Ziyad Academy (TIZA, Arabic: أكادمية طارق ابن زياد) was a K-8 school in Inver Grove Heights, Minnesota named after Tarek ibn Ziyad, the Muslim general of medieval Morocco who entered Gibraltar in 711 CE on behalf of the Umayyad Caliphate and defeated the Visigoths. The school was sponsored by Islamic Relief USA. The school had a primarily Muslim student body and has been embroiled in a number of controversies regarding the separation of church and state. The school had a waiting list of 1,500 students. Around 80% of students were English language learners. Despite this, the school had one of the highest reading scores on standardized tests in the state. As of July 2011 TiZA was shut down by order of the Minnesota Education Department, due to lack of an approved charter school sponsor.

== Founding ==
Tarek ibn Ziyad Academy opened in the fall of 2003 for the 2003–2004 school year. The school was founded by its current principal, Asad Zaman and Hesham Hussein, both local imams and leaders of the Muslim American Society of Minnesota (MAS-MN). The school opened with an enrollment of 215 students in grades K-5. The school was very popular and had 765 applicants in the first year.

== Students ==
As of the 2006–2007 school year, 302 students attended TIZA. The majority were Black (83%), with Asian (14%) and White (2%) being the other major ethnic groups. Seventy-seven percent of students qualify for Free and Reduced Price Lunch, an indicator of poverty, and the majority (81%) have had limited English proficiency. Four percent of students qualify for special education. The school's math proficiency was 23 percentage points higher than the state average and the school's reading proficiency was 3 percentage points higher than the state average, at 67 percent. Principal Asad Zaman estimates that 80 to 90 percent of students are Muslim.

== Curriculum ==
The school's curriculum focused on historical civilizations in Africa, Asia and the Middle East, and taught the Arabic language in addition to English. The school curriculum placed an emphasis on the Arabic language. After the school day ended, several optional extracurricular activities were offered. The teaching of Islamic studies after school generated controversy. The Muslim American Society of Minnesota (MAS-MN), which shared the building with TIZA, offered the classes.

== Lawsuit ==
In January, 2009, describing the Academy as "in essence, a private religious school", Charles Samuelson, executive director of the Minnesota ACLU, announced that the ACLU would file a lawsuit alleging that the Academy promotes the Muslim religion and that its directors illegally use a holding company to channel taxpayer dollars to a religious organization. The suit accuses the school of holding group prayers during school hours, including a 30-minute prayer session on Fridays, allowing teachers to post religious material on classroom bulletin boards, and enforcing Islamic rules on modesty of dress – including sleeves and skirts or trousers of a certain length, on female but not male students and teachers.

The lawsuit also named the Minnesota Department of Education and Islamic Relief, the charter school's authorizer, as co-defendants. A settlement reached in February 2011 between the ACLU and the other defendants included an agreement that Islamic Relief would not to seek to incorporate in Minnesota; under a new state law, this effectively means the out-of-state organization may no longer continue serving as TiZA's authorizer. After the school closed operations on June 30, 2011, the ACLU reached a settlement with TIZA and the individual defendants.

== Controversy ==
Star Tribune columnist Katherine Kersten spurred an inquiry into TiZA by the Minnesota Department of Education after her column suggested the school had violated the Establishment Clause of the First Amendment to the United States Constitution by teaching religion in the schools. The accusation was made by Republican Party activist Amanda Getz, who closely collaborated with Katherine Kersten as part of her ongoing efforts to close down the school.

The Department of Education found that the school had violated some lesser statutes, involving seat time and busing as well as holding prayer services on school grounds, but that it was not teaching Islam to students.

When a news crew from KSTP-TV entered the school grounds to ask for a comment about the MDoE findings, school director Asad Zaman and another school official grabbed the crew's camera. Police were already in the area at the time of the incident. No charges against KSTP (for trespassing) or the school officials (for assault) were pursued.

Asad Zaman claims that the school has received threatening telephone and e-mail messages after a newspaper journalist questioned whether the school promotes Islam. CAIR, an Islamic advocacy group, has filed a complaint with police. Authorities were investigating the messages as possible hate crimes as of April 2008.

== See also ==
- Free Exercise Clause of the First Amendment
- Separation of church and state in the United States
- Faith-based initiatives
- Board of Education of Kiryas Joel Village School District v. Grumet
- Khalil Gibran International Academy
- Ethnic-culture based charter school
