= Raul Yzaguirre Schools for Success =

State charter school system in Texas

Coordinates: 29.69793°N 95.27889°W

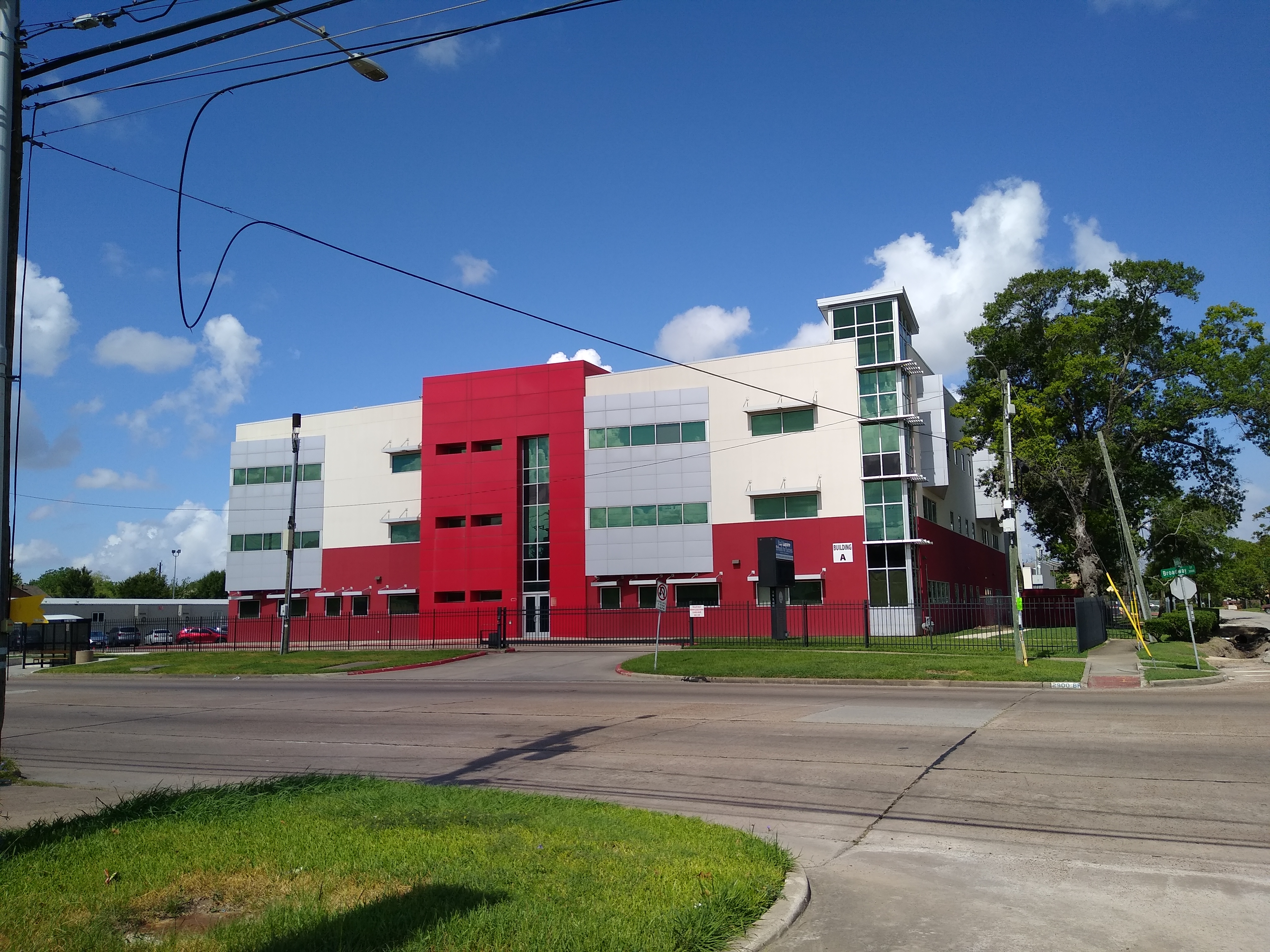
East Houston campus

Raul Yzaguirre Schools for Success (RYSS) is a state charter school system in Texas. The organization operates two schools in Texas; one is in Brownsville, and one is in Houston. The Tejano Center for Community Concerns, which operates the charter school system, has its headquarters in the RYSS campus in Houston. The Houston school has grades PK-12 in elementary, middle, and high school divisions while the Brownsville school is K-8.

The school system was named after Raul Yzaguirre, the founder of the National Council of La Raza. Richard Farias, the founder, borrowed $90,000 so he could open the school. The Houston campus originally was located in the Latino Learning Center. In 1996 the school had 100 students. In 1997 the enrollment doubled to 200. The school, which had a mostly Hispanic student body, had grades 6 through 8. Farias planned to expand the school to K-12. In 2002 the Brownsville campus was established.

As of 2019 the system had 1,299 students, with 981 combined in Houston and 349 in Brownsville.

Farias believed that middle school students need individual attention and are not well served by larger middle schools.

== See also ==
- List of state-chartered charter schools in Houston
