= Amigos Por Vida Friends For Life Charter School =

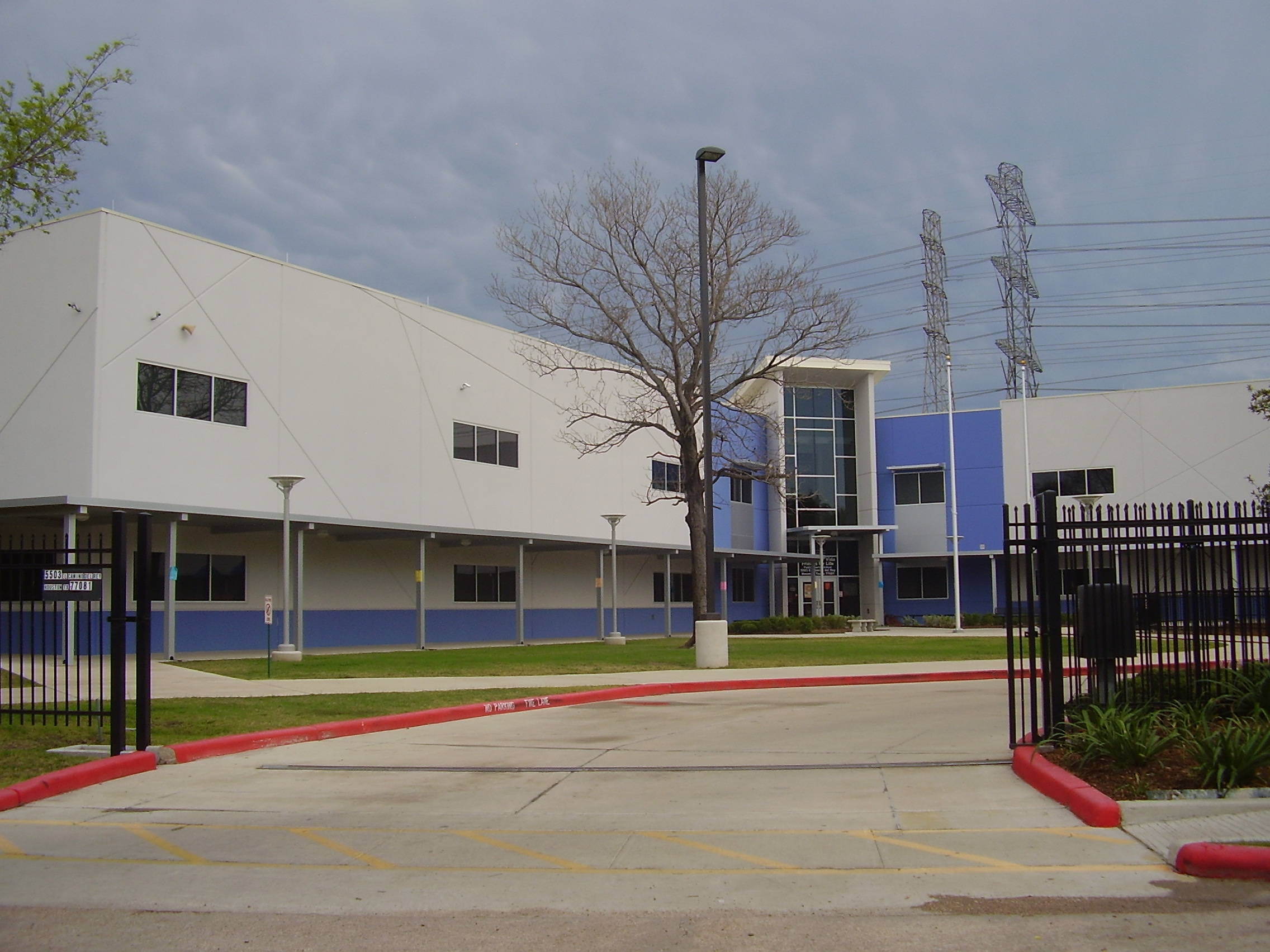

Location
- 5503 El Camino del Rey; Houston, Texas 77081; United States; 29.7221°N 95.4792°W

Information
- School type: Public K-8
- Opened: 1999
- Grades: K-8
- Gender: Coed
- Campus type: state charter school
- Website: amigosporvida.com

Amigos Por Vida Friends For Life Charter School ("Amigos por Vida" is "Friends for Life" in Spanish) is a state charter school located in the Sierra Vista Apartments in Gulfton, Houston.

== History ==
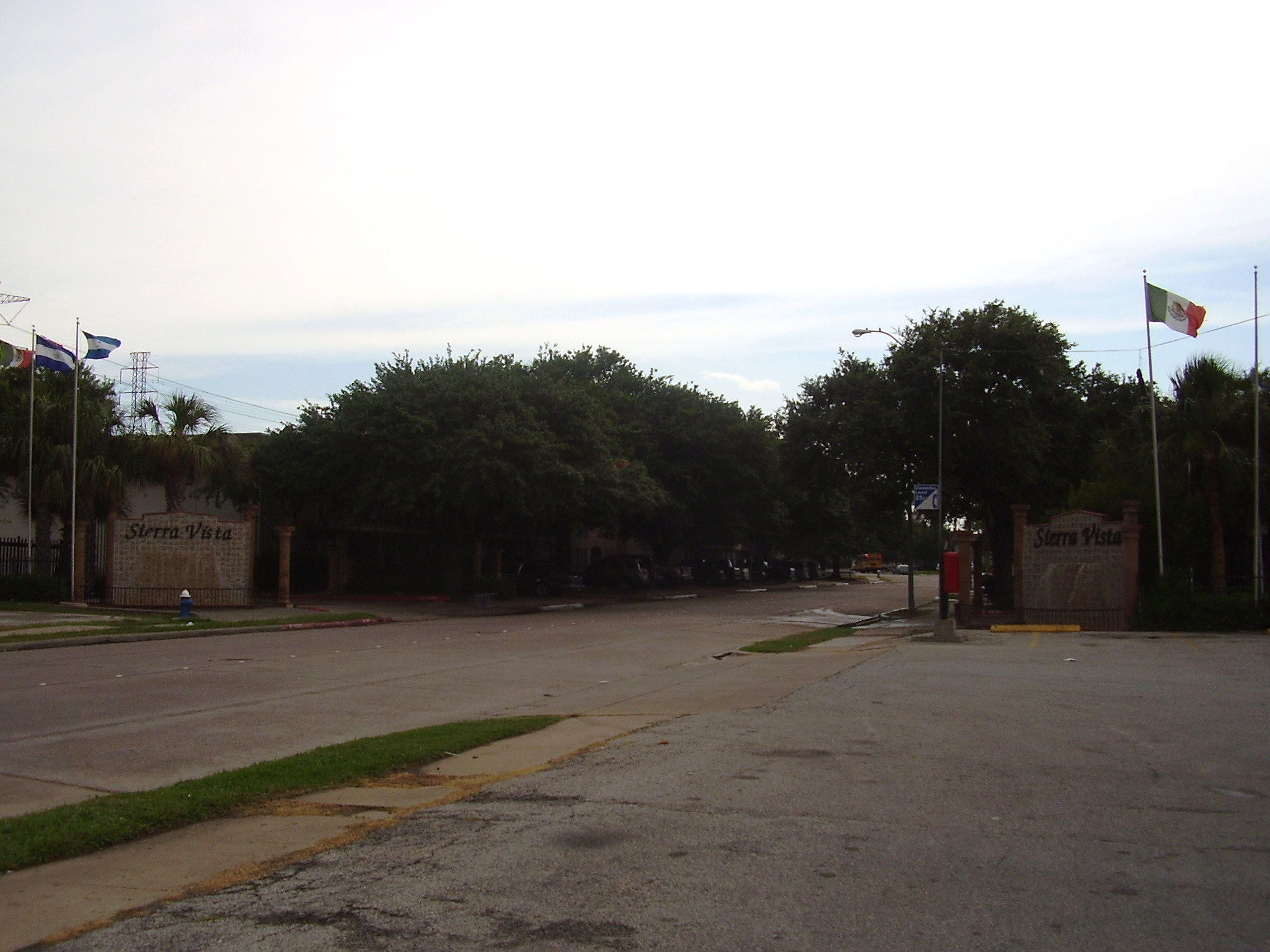
Sierra Vista Apartments

The school first opened in 1999.

In 2006, due to high Texas Assessment of Knowledge and Skills (TAKS) scores, the school received the Governor's Excellence Award. In September 2007 the U.S. Department of Education gave the school an award for helping remove the achievement gap between socioeconomically wealthy students and socioeconomically poor students.

As of 2007 the school had 430 students. During that year the school was located within several converted two and three bedroom apartment units in the Sierra Vista complex. A former clubhouse served as a cafeteria. Two efficiency units served as a library. A series of fences partially separated the school area from the residential area. As of 2007 the school rented 27 units and paid $33,500 per month. Jennifer Radcliffe of the Houston Chronicle said "The proximity is ideal for the impoverished immigrant community: Kids have few excuses for missing class and, when they do, teachers are a short walk from their front doors." In addition, parents could easily attend school meetings and functions.

As of 2007 the school had a long waiting list, and was engaging in a capital campaign to raise funds so it can move into a new building. The school hoped to establish a permanent campus with science laboratory facilities and a soccer field.

The lease in Sierra Vista was scheduled to expire in May 2009.

== Curriculum ==
The school uses a dual-immersion bilingual education program, teaching students in English and Spanish. As of 2007, first and second graders alternate between English and Spanish with one half of the day dedicated to one language, and one half dedicated to the other. With third graders and higher, each week uses one language.

== Controversy ==
In July 2024, the ACLU of Texas sent Amigos Por Vida Friends For Life Charter School a letter, arguing that the school's 2023-2024 dress and grooming code appeared to violate the Texas Creating a Respectful and Open World for Natural Hair (or CROWN) Act, which prohibits racial discrimination based on hairstyles or hair texture and which took effect in September 2023, and asking the school to revise its policies for the 2024-2025 school year.

== See also ==
- List of state-chartered charter schools in Houston
- Language/culture-based charter school
- SER-Niños Charter School
- https://www.greatschools.org/texas/houston/8541-Amigos-Por-Vida-Friends-For-Life-C/
