= Houston Heights High School =

Charter school in Texas, United States

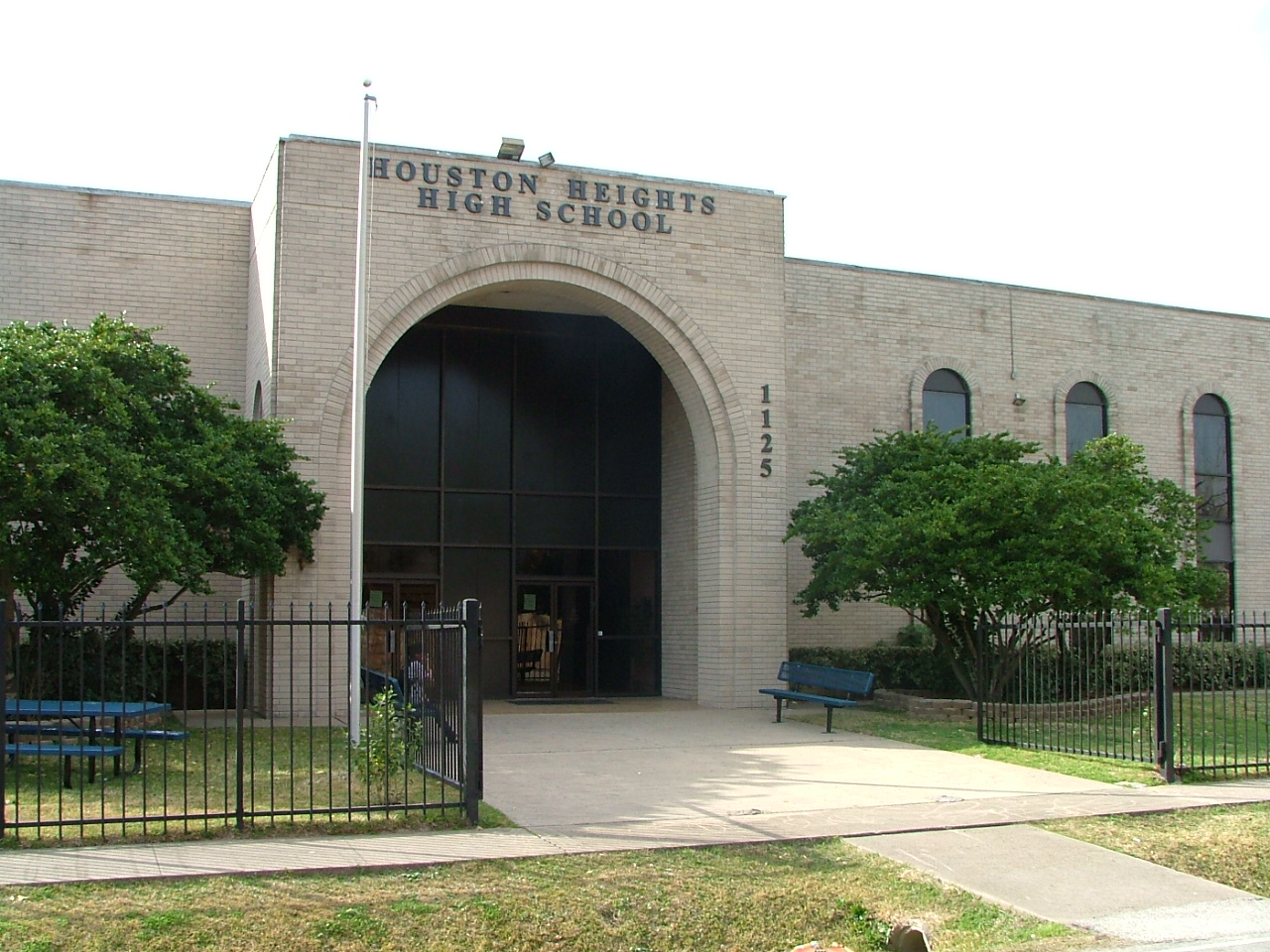

Location
- 1125 Lawrence Street; Houston, Texas 77008; United States; 29.791664°N 95.407307°W

Information
- Other name: HHHS
- Type: Public charter high school
- Motto: Leadership, Excellence, Perseverance
- Established: 1999
- NCES School ID: 480011508239
- Principal: Erica McCready
- Teaching staff: 19.13 (on an FTE basis)
- Grades: 9–12
- Enrollment: 173 (2022-2023)
- Student to teacher ratio: 9.04
- Campus type: Urban
- Color: Azure blue
- Mascot: Panther
- Website: www.heightshs.org

Houston Heights High School (HHHS, formerly Houston Heights Charter) is a public charter high school in Houston, Texas, United States. It was established in 1999 by superintendent Richard Mik.

Located in the Houston Heights neighborhood, it serves 96% at-risk students and partners with Houston Community College to give students the opportunity to gain college credit during their junior and/or senior years, including in the area of construction management.

In 2009, the school was rated "academically acceptable" by the Texas Education Agency.

== Athletics ==
Houston Heights High School offers Men's Basketball, Men's Soccer, and Cheerleading. The basketball team won the Texas Charter School Academic & Athletic League (TCSAAL) state championship in 2010 after finishing runner-up in 2009.

== Student body ==
HHHS had 251 students during the 2007–2008 school year.

- 61% were Hispanic
- 32% were African-American
- 7% were White
- 0% were Asian

86% of the students qualified for free or reduced breakfast.

== See also ==
- List of state-chartered charter schools in Houston
