= KIPP Texas Public Schools =

Charter school network in Texas, United States

KIPP Texas Public Schools, is the branch of the KIPP charter school network in the U.S. state of Texas.

It consists of four regional offices each in Austin, Dallas, Houston, and San Antonio.

== History ==
Circa 2003 KIPP had four separate charter school networks in the state for each of the regions it operated in: Austin, Dallas, Houston, and San Antonio.

Mark Larson, a graduate of Trinity University, established the San Antonio branch in 2003. He eventually became the chief external officer of KIPP Texas, as well as the KIPP San Antonio superintendent.

Larson resigned in 2019. As of 2019 he is the head of City Education Partners (CEP). Allen Smith became the head of the KIPP San Antonio schools.

In 2018 KIPP announced that its four Texas divisions would merge into a single statewide network.

== Schools ==
=== Houston area ===
As of 2017 KIPP Houston had 12,100 students.

High schools(9-12)

- KIPP Mosaic Academy (2020)
- KIPP: East End High School (2020)
- KIPP Journey Collegiate (2019)
- KIPP: Connect High School (2018) serving Gulfton and Sharpstown
- KIPP Generations Collegiate (KGC) (2011) (north Houston)
- KIPP Houston High School (2004)
- KIPP Northeast College Preparatory (2013)
- KIPP: Sunnyside High School - Opened in 2010. KIPP Sunnyside HS serves students from the Sunnyside, Third Ward, and Hiram Clarke areas.

Middle schools(5-8)

- KIPP Voyage Academy for Girls (2009)
- KIPP Mosaic Academy (2020)
- KIPP 3D Academy(2001)
- KIPP Academy (1994) (west Houston)
- KIPP Academy West (2015) (far west Houston)
- KIPP CONNECT Middle School (2014)
- KIPP Courage College Prep at Landrum Middle School(2012-2024) (Spring Branch), at Landrum Middle School of the Spring Branch Independent School District
- KIPP Intrepid (2008)
- KIPP Journey (2019) (west Houston)
- KIPP Liberation(2006) (Third Ward)
- KIPP Nexus (2017) (northwest Houston)
- KIPP Polaris Academy for Boys (2007) (northeast Houston)
- KIPP Prime College Prep (2016) (East End)
- KIPP Sharpstown College Prep(2007)
- KIPP Spirit College Prep (2006)(Sunnyside area)
  - In 2015 Children at Risk ranked this school as "F".

Elementary schools(K-4)

- KIPP Mosaic Primary(2020)
- KIPP Climb Academy (2016)
- KIPP CONNECT Primary school (2014)
- KIPP Dream Prep(2006) (north Houston)
- KIPP Explore Academy(2009) (southeast Houston)
- KIPP Journey (2019) (west Houston)
- KIPP Legacy Preparatory School (2010)(northeast Houston)
- KIPP NEXUS Primary School (2017) (northwest Houston)
- KIPP PEACE Elementary School(2011)
- KIPP SHARP Prep(2008)
- KIPP SHINE Prep(2004) (west Houston)
- KIPP Unity Primary (2015)
- KIPP: Zenith Academy (Sunnyside area) - KIPP Zenith opened as part of a wave of KIPP elementary schools opening in 2010. In 2015 Children at Risk ranked this school as "F".

Closed schools

- KIPP North Forest Lower School and Lower Girls School

=== San Antonio area ===
The San Antonio branch was known as KIPP San Antonio Public Schools

High schools
grades 9-12
- KIPP: University Prep High School (2009)
grade 6-12
- KIPP: Somos Collegiate ("somos" means "we are" in Spanish)
Middle schools
Grades 5-8
- KIPP: Aspire Academy (2003)
- KIPP: Camino Academy (2010)
Elementary schools
Grades PK-4
- KIPP: Esperanza Primary School (2015) ("esperanza" means "hope" in Spanish)
- KIPP: Un Mundo Primary School (2012)("un mundo" means "a world" in Spanish)
- KIPP Somos Primary (PK-2nd;2023)

=== Austin area ===
High schools
grades 9-12
- KIPP Austin Brave High School (2016)
- KIPP Austin Collegiate (2008)
Middle schools
Grades 5-8
- KIPP Austin Academy of Arts and Letters (2009)
- KIPP Austin Beacon Prep (2012)
- KIPP Austin College Prep (2002)
- KIPP Austin Vista Middle School (2012)
- KIPP Paseo Preparatory (2020)
Elementary schools
grades PK-4
- KIPP Algeria Primary School (2020)
- KIPP Austin Comunidad (2010)
- KIPP Austin Connections (2011)
- KIPP Paseo Primary School (2020)
- KIPP Austin Obras (2013)
- KIPP Austin Leadership Elementary School (2013)

=== Dallas Fort Worth Area ===
High schools
Grades 9-12
- KIPP Oak Cliff Academy (2018)
Middle schools
Grades 5-8
- KIPP Destiny Middle School (2015)
- KIPP Truth Academy (2003)
Elementary schools
Grades PK-4th
- KIPP Destiny Elementary (2013)
- KIPP Truth Elementary (2015)

== See also ==
- Education in San Antonio
- List of state-chartered charter schools in Houston
- Education in Houston
