= Iman Academy =

- Houston, Texas; United States

Information
- Type: Private school
- Motto: Striving for Excellence
- Established: 1996
- Faculty: 20
- Grades: K-12
- Enrollment: 500 (2012)
- Color(s): Green and White
- Website: imanacademy.org

Iman Academy (Arabic: مدارس الإيمان) is an Islamic K-12 private school system in Houston with two campuses serving grades one through grade twelve. Iman Academy was established in 1995 by a group of community members and families.

Iman Academy offers Arabic K-12 along with Quran and Islamic Studies in addition to its standard coursework. Iman Academy requires all students to complete a minimum of 120 hours of community service before graduation. Iman Academy has certified teachers many of whom hold Masters and PhD's. Iman Academy has a little over 100 employees across the two campuses.

Iman Academy has between 700-1,000 students across both campuses. The student body is made up of Arabs, Hispanics, African Americans, Africans, Indian, Bengali, Pakistani, Indonesians, etc. Many students are American born and raised along with students who are immigrants to the U.S. Iman Academy has students who come from single family homes and traditional family homes.

Iman Academy Southeast is located in southeast Houston. Iman Academy Southeast is spread over two campuses with a K-5 program at the Almeda location and a middle school and high school program at the Jestream campus.

Iman Academy has a licensed early child care programs at both locations under the name of Faith Southwest Childcare and Faith Southeast Childcare, both are located on the same property as the school. The childcare offers centers based learning programs and teaches Arabic, Quran, English, Math and Islamic Studies. Faith Childcare takes children anywhere from 1 month to 5 years old.

== Campuses ==
Campuses in Houston

Iman Academy Southwest is currently in the limited purpose Houston city limits. Previously it was in Mission Bend CDP. Students reside in Southwest Houston, Bellaire, Stafford, and Sugar Land.

The southeast campus is in Houston, with a Webster postal address. Students attending the southeast campus reside in the Clear Lake area, Friendswood, League City, Pasadena, Pearland, and Webster. The school administration and Southeast Campus were previously at 10929 Almeda Genoa Road in Houston.

== Student body ==
As of 2012 Iman Academy Southwest had 500 students.

== Athletics ==
As of 2012 Iman Academy Southwest schedules its own athletic games against other schools. Some athletes from the school join city-based athletic leagues. In 2010 Iman Academy Southwest submitted an application to join the Texas Association of Private and Parochial Schools (TAPPS), the state's private school athletic and competition league. TAPPS responded by asking Iman to complete a questionnaire with questions like "Historically, there is nothing in the Koran that fully embraces Christianity or Judaism in the way a Christian and/or a Jew understands his religion. Why, then, are you interested in joining an association whose basic beliefs your religion condemns?" Iman Academy SW did, unlike other schools, fill out the questionnaire and the attached application, and TAPPS denied Iman SW admission into the league. In 2012 the school again attempted to join TAPPS, but it was again denied.

In 2012-2013 Iman Academy Southwest joined an All Girls Softball League, one of the four Iman Academy Southwest All Girls Softball teams placed second in finals. Iman Academy has a strong and competitive soccer team. Many Iman Academy students play in local baseball, soccer, karate, basketball, and fencing teams and are star players. Iman Academy has had Olympic qualifying students in different areas.

Iman Academy is not associated with any organization or mosque. None of the campuses are attached to a mosque, but prayer services are held on campus for students, teachers and staff online.

== See also ==
- Islam in Houston
