= Memorial Private High School =

Educational institution in Texas

Coordinates: 29.774479°N 95.598119°W

Memorial Private School is a private life and college prep school for grades 6-12 in the Memorial area of Houston, Texas. Opened in 2004, the school was established by Harry and Pam Camp, who respectively originated from the Sharpstown and Spring Branch communities.. A leading innovator in research-based education, Memorial Private School works closely with top companies and universities. Accredited by the Southern Association of Colleges and Schools (SACS).
