= Wonderland Avenue Elementary School =

Public elementary school in Laurel Canyon, Los Angeles

Location
- 8510 Wonderland Ave, Los Angeles, CA 90046; United States; 34.114395°N 118.379806°W

Information
- Type: Public, gifted magnet program
- School district: Los Angeles Unified School District
- Grades: K-5
- Website: wonderlandavees.lausd.org

Wonderland Avenue Elementary School is a public elementary school in the Laurel Canyon neighborhood of Los Angeles, California. Ranked one of the best elementary schools in California, Wonderland is known for its gifted magnet program and high number of prominent parents in the entertainment industry.

== Notable alumni ==
- James Badge Dale, actor
- Rachel Mason, artist
