= The Tenney School =

Private school in Houston, Texas, United States

Coordinates: 29.725712°N 95.539934°W

The Tenney School is a private middle and high school in western Houston, Texas, United States. It is within the Westchase Management District and the City of Houston-defined Westchase Super Neighborhood.

The school was established in 1973. In 2013 the school opened a new facility. Students at Tenney School are taught on a one by one basis. George Tenney, the director, said in 1993 that his school had to turn away prospective applicants. The Tenney School offers a unique one-to-one teaching model of individualized learning. The Tenney School has maintained accreditation through AdvancED since 1979, most recently receiving the highest possible rating in 4 of 7 categories.
