= SER-Niños Charter School =

Coordinates: 29.718375°N 95.480182°W

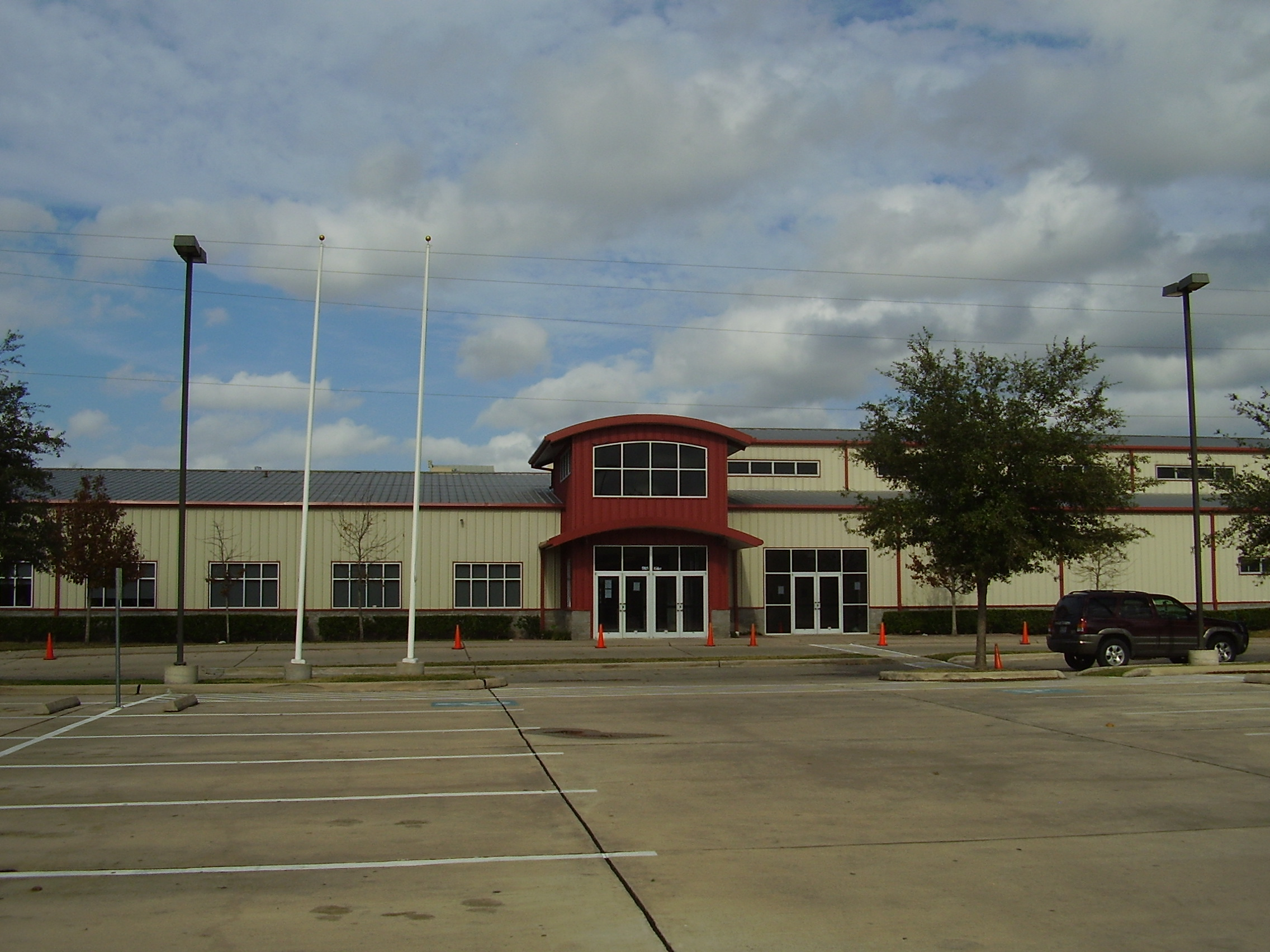
- SER-Niños Charter School original campus

Location
- Original: 5815 Alder St. Houston, TX 77081; Middle: 5610 Gulfton St. Houston, TX 77081; II: 5919 Dashwood Dr. Houston, TX 77081; Gulfton, Houston, Texas; United States

Information
- Type: Charter school
- Established: 1996
- Grades: Kindergarten—12th
- Website: serninos.org

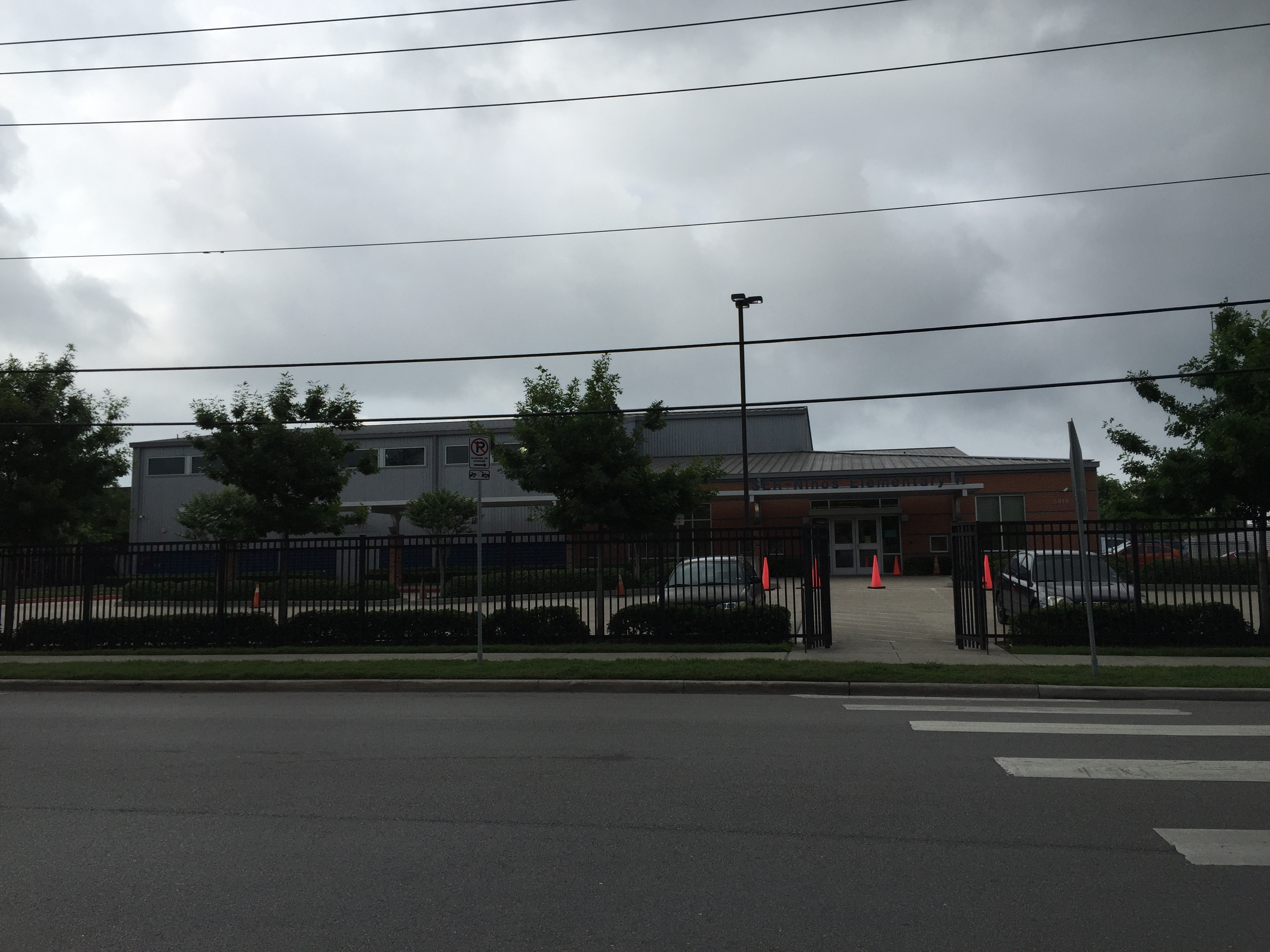
SER-Niños II

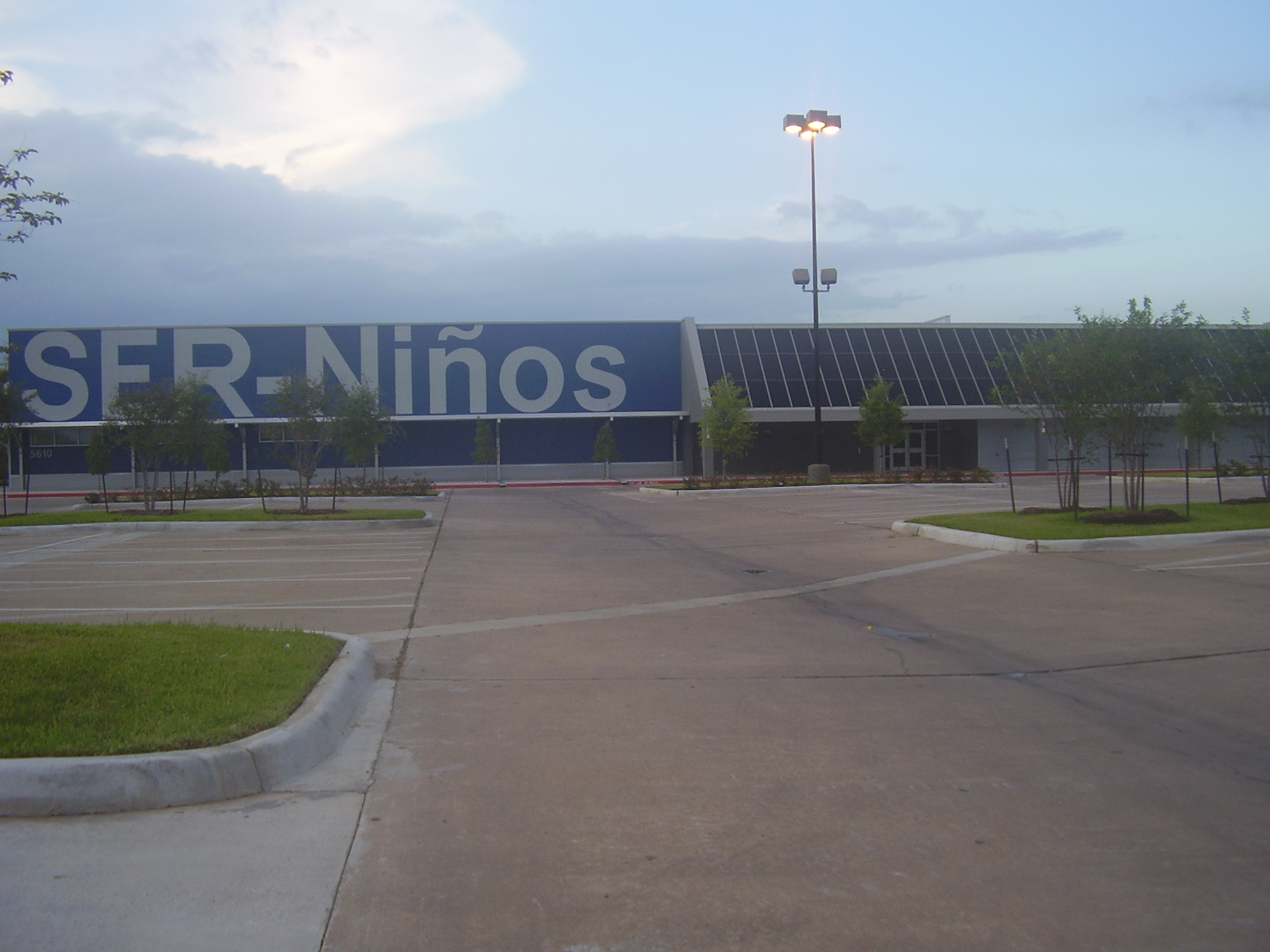
Middle school campus

SER-Niños Charter School ("Niños" means children in Spanish) is a PreK-12 state charter school in the Gulfton area of Houston, Texas. The school has four campuses: An elementary school, a middle school, SER-Niños Charter School II and a high school.

== History ==
The concept of SER-Niños was created by Dianne Mancus; she worked with the Houston Hispanic Forum to help obtain a charter to operate the school. Mancus said "if they could open a Rice School in West U, then we can open one in the barrio." SER-Niños, which opened in 1996, was among the first generation of Texas charter schools. SER-Niños was originally within rented rooms of the Bellaire Christian Church in Gulfton before moving into its own $5 million facility on Alder Drive. Mancus left her job after her husband's job was transferred to Atlanta, Georgia. Even though the school did not engage in much promotion, it became very popular. The school's initial 155 slots quickly filled after its opening. The school added fifth grade classes in 1997 and middle school classes in 2004. Word of mouth regarding the school spread throughout the Gulfton community. By 2009 the school planned to find a new site for elementary school classes within a three-year period. The school has since opened SER-Niños II.

== Admissions ==
The school admits students via a lottery. The only preference that the school gives in the lottery is to siblings of already admitted students.

Campuses in Gulfton

== Administration ==
SER-Niños as of 2009 receives state funds per student and relies on philanthropy for other expenses. While the school's teacher pay scales are equivalent to the pay scales of the Houston Independent School District, SER-Niños does not have signing bonuses. Since SER-Niños not a part of any school district, administrators do not go to a central authority to ask for approval of any proposed changes. A decision by the administration is made after a teacher submits a proposal and other faculty vote on the proposal.

== Curriculum ==
The school's classes are completely bilingual. As of 2009 the language of instruction of the classes alternates each week between English and Spanish. Originally the students switched languages every day, but the faculty believed that the approach was too chaotic, so the school instead had the languages switch on a weekly basis. Allen Matusow, a history professor and academic affairs director who served on the board of directors of SER-Niños as a member and as a one-time chairperson, said that the school decided to use the dual language approach because studies demonstrated that the approach was the most effective manner of teaching two languages. Classes of lower grades tend to have mixed grade level classes; for instance one class would have first and second grade students together. As of 2009 each student has to take three years of learning a musical instrument. All students have to learn keyboarding. Middle school students go on field trips to colleges and universities. Students in the seventh and eighth grades are required to take French.

As of 2009 parents are required to sign agenda books and assignments on a daily basis. Parents are also required to attend parent-teacher conferences. The school calls parents and asks them to go to the school if a student submits unsigned or incomplete assignments. Charmaine Constantine, the principal of the school, said in 2009 that students who fail courses at the school tend to do so because they do not continue doing their assignments or because their parents are no longer willing to continue signing assignments and drive the students to extra Saturday classes.

== School uniforms ==
Students are required to wear school uniforms. The uniform for elementary consists of white or yellow polo shirts and navy blue pants, skirt, or shorts. Middle school uniforms include shirts and khaki pants: the 6th grade has a green shirt w/the logo of the school logo on the left side, 7th grade has a red shirt with the school logo, and the 8th grade has a blue shirt with the school logo as well. Students may not wear pants with tears or any type of skinny jeans.

== Student body ==
As of 2007 most students are of Mexican and Salvadoran descent and around 80 percent of the students are economically disadvantaged. Most students begin attending the school in the Pre-Kindergarten classes, and the school sees little student turnover. Many parents enroll their children in SER-Niños because they want their children to develop better English language skills quickly or because they do not want their children to lose their Spanish language skills. In 2009, Christopher Strane, a teacher at SER-Niños, said that when the school loses students before graduation, most of the students move to suburbs or out of Greater Houston.

== Student performance ==
In 2000 the school's overall passing rate for Texas Assessment of Academic Skills (TAAS) examinations was 27 points below the Texas state average of 78%. The school's scores were below the state's averages by 26 points in mathematics, 29 points in reading, and 27 points in writing.

In 2009 the school's Texas Assessment of Knowledge and Skills (TAKS) scores included 97% in mathematics, 91% for reading, 76% for science, 99% for social studies, and 99% for writing.

== See also ==
- List of state-chartered charter schools in Houston
- Language/culture-based charter school
- Amigos Por Vida Friends For Life Charter School
