= The Monarch School =

Location
- Houston, Texas; United States; 29.823825°N 95.537920°W

The Monarch School is a combined primary and secondary school headquartered in Spring Branch, Houston, Texas. Monarch serves children with neurological disorders and learning disabilities, including attention deficit hyperactivity disorder, dyslexia, autism spectrum disorders, Tourette's syndrome, and epilepsy.

Monarch opened in September 1998 with twenty-three students. Monarch now serves grades kindergarten through 12th grade. Young adults are also served through the Monarch post-graduate program and through a community-based, school-sponsored supportive living program.

== History ==
In 1997 the school was founded and opened for classes in the northern hemisphere fall of 1998. In 2001 the school opened its Challenger Campus. In 2005 the school was given a 90-year lease on a 10.75-acre plot of land. In 2009 the first building, Chrysalis, was completed. The Butterfly building was completed in 2013.

== Campuses ==
The campus is located at 2815 Rosefield Drive in Spring Branch. Staff faculty and students are dispersed between 3 buildings the Chrysalis building (K-12), the Butterfly building (6–12), an Administration building and a life Academy which houses a commercially licensed kitchen and a business center. The Monarch School is also a participant in the living building challenge which they are striving to reach a certain point to where they can complete the challenge which is to have a freestanding fully self sustained building. Previously the main campus of The Monarch School was on grounds owned by the Houston Mennonite Church, within the city of Hilshire Village; Monarch has no affiliation with the church. The original Hilshire Village Campus was called the Apprentice Campus. The Craig and Lee Williams Challenger Campus was located five blocks south of the Apprentice campus.

The school is currently involved in a major capital campaign program as it prepares for Phase 2 and 3 of the building project. These phases consist of two additional buildings that are to be named the Butterfly Building and the Monarch Center, and will complete The Monarch School's permanent home. The project was completed in 2013.

== Diagnostic clinic ==
Both programs of The Monarch School have a Monarch Diagnostic Clinic, established in 2004. The clinics were established to provide services to students of the school and to the community at large. Services include:

- psychological, diagnostic, and educational assessments
- DIR© (Developmental, Individual-Difference, Relationship-Based) therapy services
- speech/language evaluations
- tutoring
- consultation, including training of faculty from other schools.

== School uniforms ==
The Monarch School requires its students to wear school uniforms. Currently the uniform is a white or dark green shirt with the Monarch symbol over the left breast, and beige pants or shorts.
