= George I. Sanchez Charter Schools =

State charter secondary school system in Houston, Texas

George I. Sanchez Charter Schools is a state charter secondary school system in Houston, Texas, operated by the Association for the Advancement of Mexican Americans (AAMA; Spanish: Asociación del Avance de México Americanos). It operates George I. Sanchez Charter School, also known as George I. Sanchez High School; and George I. Sanchez Charter School North. They are located in the East End and Northside, respectively. As of 2003 the schools cater to students who experienced difficulties at other schools.

== History ==
Sanchez was established on 1995 as a private school and was converted into a charter school, making it one of the first charter schools in Texas.

== Campus ==
The East End campus is located at the AAMA complex on Interstate 45, and in 2002 was surrounded by industrial facilities. The current 55,000-square-foot (5,100 m^{2}) three story building of the East End campus opened in 2009, with a cost of $7.5 million. The building design was inspired by Mayan architecture. A 40-foot (12 m) ceramic tile mural, funded by grant money from the Texas Commission on the Arts and the United Way of Greater Houston, was unveiled at the East End campus in 2008. The Orange Show Center for Visionary Art oversaw its creation, done by Sanchez students.

The first East End building had a capacity of 300-400 students.

== Student body ==
As of 2009 the East End campus had about 600 students.

By 2001 the enrollment there was about 500, above the capacity of the facility.

== Operations ==
The school does not have zero tolerance policies held in traditional school districts.

In 2001 the school administration stated that it had a relatively lean school spending apparatus, so it could do more tasks with a lower budget.

== Academic performance ==
In 2002 77% of the students passed the state writing tests, 87% passed the mathematics tests, and 95% passed the reading tests. In 2001 11th grade students (juniors) were in the Texas Assessment of Academic Skills (TAAS) mathematics test 90th percentile and 10th grade students (sophomores) were in the TAAS mathematics 80th percentile. The school's mathematics scores increased by 28 points in 2000.

As of 2001, and 2003, the school had relatively low accountability ratings from the state due to a large number of students dropping out, despite its test scores.

== See also ==
- List of state-chartered charter schools in Houston

== See also ==
- History of Mexican Americans in Houston
