= Harris County Department of Education =

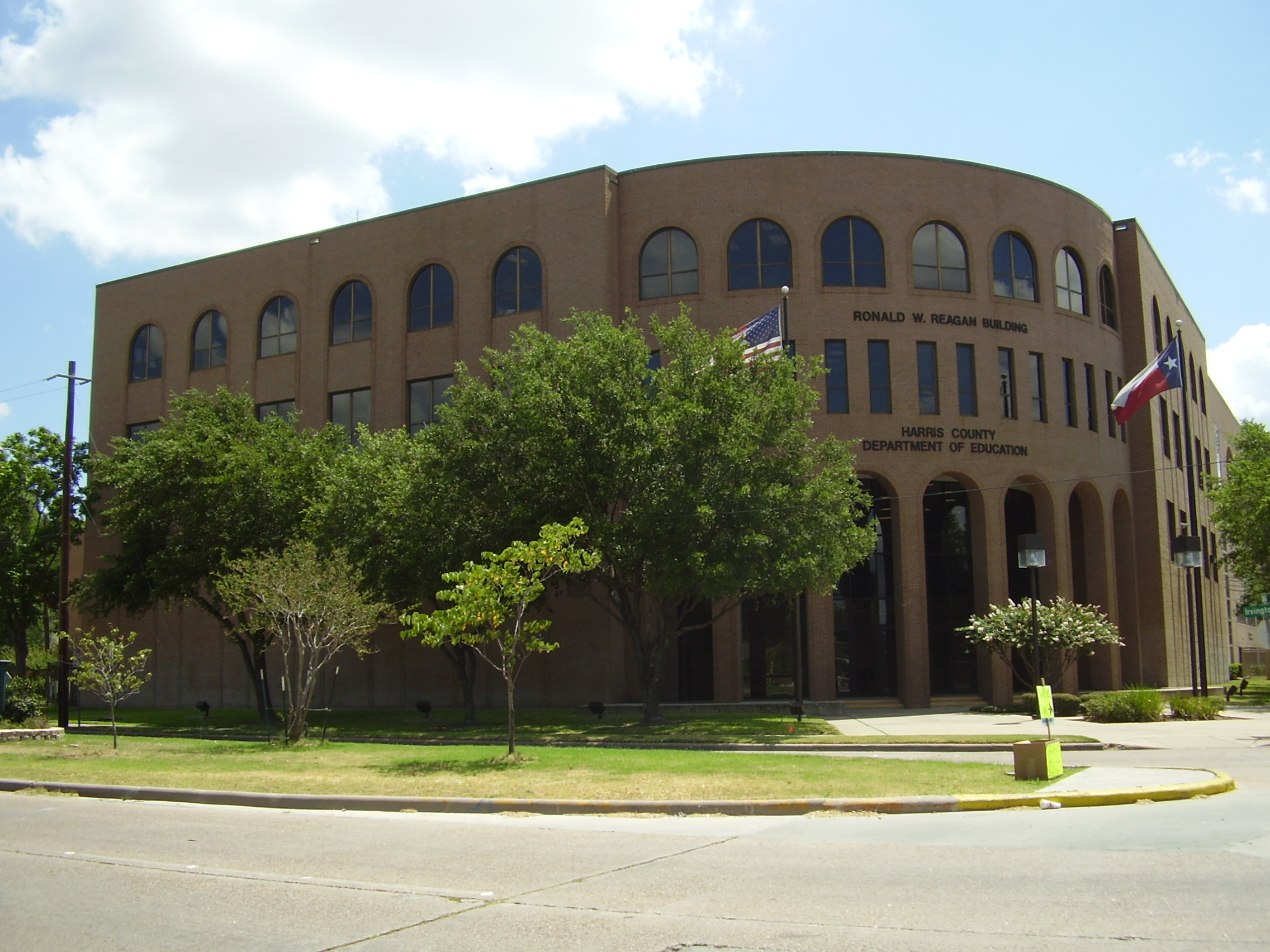
Ronald W. Reagan Building, the agency's headquarters in Northside, Houston

Harris County Department of Education (HCDE) is an agency of the government of Harris County, Texas, in the Houston metropolitan area; it is headquartered in Northside district in Houston. As of 2018 it handles the enrollment of around 200 students with special needs.

Under Texas law it is not a school district.

Seven elected Harris County school trustees oversee the operation of the Harris County Department of Education. Trustees are elected through a partisan election process via the Republican and Democratic primaries and in the November general elections, serving staggered six-year terms of office, with three trustees elected countywide and four trustees elected to oversee the four commissioner precincts in Harris County.

== Facilities ==
It is headquartered in the Ronald W. Reagan Administration Building in Northside district in Houston.

=== Schools ===
It directly operates the following alternative schools:

- HCDE Academic and Behavior Schools - Two campuses in Houston, East and West. They were previously known as Adaptive Behavior Centers (ABC). As of 2001 all school districts in the county may send students to these schools.
  - For students with disabilities that affect their classroom behavior or performance, they serve ages 5–22.
- Fortis Academy - unincorporated area, in Greenspoint
  - It was scheduled to open in 2018 and is the first recovery high school to open in Harris County.
- Highpoint School East - unincorporated area
  - It enrolls children who were expelled from regular public school districts and/or adjudicated delinquent by youth courts. It serves grades 6-12.

The county previously operated Highpoint North, an alternative school for children with behavior problems, located at the current Fortis Academy location.

As of 2001 seven school districts sent students with behavior problems to Harris County Highpoint Schools.

== See also ==
- List of schools in Harris County, Texas
