= The Covenant Preparatory School =

Coordinates: 30.028638°N 95.228929°W

Location
- 1711 Hamblen Road, Kingwood, Texas 77339; Houston, Texas; United States

Information
- Former name: Northeast Christian Academy
- Type: Preparatory school, Private school, Christian school
- Established: 1993
- School board: Shaun Dean, Chair; Kyle Lipstreu, Vice Chair; Robert White, Treasurer; Jeff Rogers, Secretary; Chris Pitts; Ali Trousdale; Nathan Lino
- School number: (281) 359-1090
- Lower School Principal: Dr. Erica Nevenglosky
- Upper School Principal: Jessica Crowell
- Head of school: Lorraine Hill
- Grades: PreK-12
- Enrollment: 291
- Average class size: 9.22
- Education system: Classical education, Classical Christian education
- Language: Latin, Spanish
- Athletics conference: TAPPS
- Mascot: Knight
- Accreditation: ACSI AdvancED
- Communities served: Kingwood, TX; Humble, TX; Porter, Texas; New Caney, TX; Huffman, TX; Splendora, TX; Northeast Houston, TX; Cleveland, TX
- Affiliation: Texas Private Schools Assoc.
- Website: www.covenantknights.org

Established in 1993, The Covenant Preparatory School (previously named Northeast Christian Academy) is a private college preparatory Christian school located in the Kingwood area of Houston, Texas. The school consists of Pre-K through 12th Grade.
