= Juan B. Galaviz Charter School =

Location
- 1507 Little York; Houston, Texas 77093; United States
- Coordinates: 29.871619°N 95.363182°W

Information
- Superintendent: Luis R. Cano, Ed.D
- CEEB code: 443578
- Principal: Roberto Lopez
- Teaching staff: 9.6 (FTE) (as of 2007-08)
- Grades: 9-12
- Enrollment: 68 (as of 2007-08)
- Student to teacher ratio: 7.1 (as of 2007-08)
- Mascot: Phoenix
- Website: galavizacademy.org

Juan B. Galaviz Charter School (JBG) was a state charter school located in Houston, Texas. The charter high school was an affiliate of the National Council of La Raza. Previously the school was located in the Northside district of Houston.

== History ==
Galaviz Charter School was one program of Galaviz Academy, an educational organization established in 1993. The organization's programs include vocational training, ESL instruction, and an education support and advocacy program for adjudicated youth 10–16 years of age. In 2012 it had 70 students; they were categorized as at-risk.

In 2012 Nency Garcia pleaded guilty to embezzling $40,000 ($56095.09 according to inflation) from Galaviz.

The school was scheduled to hold another school year starting in fall 2013, but it closed shortly before the beginning of the school year since it was in financial trouble. It owed $27,000 ($37317.86 according to inflation) in payroll taxes to the Internal Revenue Service (IRS) as of March 2013. The Texas Education Agency (TEA) revoked accreditation due to the loss of the tax-exempt status, with notification that it would do so dated July 19, 2013.

== School uniform ==
Students are required to wear school uniforms.

== Data from Texas Education Agency (TEA) ==
The school has District Number 101852 and Campus Number 101852001. The school is located in Harris County and Houston Metropolitan Area. The school teaches grades 9–12. "Years of Operation" numbers indicate that the school most likely started operation in the 2002–2003 school year.

Performance Data (school year)
school year	Rating	Enrollment	Student-Teacher Ratio	Completion Rate	Attendance Rate	Mobility Rate	Dropout Rate	Four-year Graduation Rate	Student Achievement index	Student Progress index	Closing Performance Gaps index	Postsecondary Readiness index	TAKS Reading/ELA Passing	TAKS Math Passing	notes
2003–2004	Academically Unacceptable	92 (Note: The exact dates for these data are unclear, and could be, for example, for the previous or upcoming year.)	14.2		84.7[%]								30.0%	43.0%	
2004–2005	AEA, Academically Acceptable	86	10.0		90.6[%]		8.5[%]						32.0%	13.0%	
2005–2006	AEA, Academically Acceptable	100	11.1		89.3[%]								68%	25%	
2006–2007	AEA: Academically Acceptable	70	10.0	58.1[%]	85.1[%]								52%	33%	
2008–2009	AEA: Academically Unacceptable	64													
2011–2012						46.7%	1.8%	12.5%					48%	64%	
2012–2013						55.1%	5.2%	16.7%	55[%]	34[%]	57[%]	25[%]	38%	79%	

Performance Data (calendar year)
year	Adjusted Campus TAKS Score	notes
2007	44.053	

Demographic Data
school year	African American	Hispanic	White	Economically Disadvantaged	notes
2003–2004	3.3%	92.4%	3.3%	82.6%	
2004–2005	2.3%	96.5%	1.2%	91.9%	
2005–2006	3.0%	95.0%	2.0%	96.0%	
2006–2007	0.0%	97.1%	2.9%	88.6%	

Financial Data
school year	Expenditure Per Student	6100	6200	6300	6400	6500	6600	Total Expenditures	Local Revenue	FSP + PER CAPITA Revenue	Other State Revenue	Total State Revenue	Federal Revenue	Total Revenue	Difference Revenue vs Expend	% Difference	Expenditures per Enroll	Expenditures per ADA	Revenue per Enroll	Revenue per ADA	notes
2003–2004		$507,704	$121,832	$17,408	$35,718	$817	$0	$683,479	$54,722	$485,395	$7,168		$247,464	$794,749	$111,270	14.0%	$7,429	$9,863	$8,639	$11,469	
2004–2005		$695,463	$96,418	$14,133	$5,153	$0	$0	$811,167	$50,905	$584,208	$10,377		$84,655	$730,145	-$81,022	-11.1%	$9,432	$10,818	$8,490	$9,738	
2005–2006	$4,739	$485,944	$119,805	$39,234	$1,505	$0		$646,488	$0			$629,277	$134,048	$763,325	$116,837	15.3%	$6,465	$8,278	$7,633	$9,774	
2006–2007	$4,637																				

ADA Data
school year	Enrollment	ADA	Enrollment to ADA	1st Six Weeks ADA	2nd Six Weeks ADA	% Change	3rd Six Weeks ADA	% Change	4th Six Weeks ADA	% Change	5th Six Weeks ADA	% Change	6th Six Weeks ADA	% Change	Notes
2003–2004	92	69													
2004–2005	86	75	114.7%	80.5	77.9	-3.2%	75.4	-3.3%	73.9	-1.9%	73.1	-1.1%	69.0	-5.7%	
2005–2006	100	78	128.0%	80	86	7.4%	84	-2.6%	79	-6.0%	73	-7.0%	67	-8.5%	

== See also ==
- List of state-operated charter schools in Houston
