= List of high schools in Texas =

This is a list of high schools in the state of Texas.

== Anderson County ==
- Cayuga High School, Cayuga
- Elkhart High School, Elkhart
- Frankston High School, Frankston
- Neches High School, Neches
- Slocum High School, Slocum

=== Palestine ===
- Palestine High School
- UT Tyler University Academy Palestine, charter school
- Westwood High School

== Andrews County ==
- Andrews High School, Andrews

== Angelina County ==
- Central High School, Pollok
- Diboll High School, Diboll
- Huntington High School, Huntington
- Zavalla High School, Zavalla

=== Lufkin ===
- Hudson High School
- Lufkin High School
- Pineywoods Community Academy

== Aransas County ==
- Rockport-Fulton High School, Rockport

== Archer County ==
- Archer City High School, Archer City
- Holliday High School, Holliday
- Windthorst High School, Windthorst

== Armstrong County ==
- Claude High School, Claude

== Atascosa County ==
- Charlotte High School, Charlotte
- Jourdanton High School, Jourdanton
- Lytle High School, Lytle
- Pleasanton High School, Pleasanton
- Poteet High School, Poteet

== Austin County ==
- Bellville High School, Bellville
- Brazos High School, Wallis
- Sealy High School, Sealy

== Bailey County ==
- Muleshoe High School, Muleshoe

== Bandera County ==
- Bandera High School, Bandera
- Medina High School, Medina

== Bastrop County ==
- McDade High School, McDade
- Smithville High School, Smithville

=== Bastrop ===
- Bastrop High School
- Cedar Creek High School
- Colorado River Collegiate Academy
- Genesis High School

=== Elgin ===
- Elgin High School
- Phoenix High School

== Baylor County ==
- Seymour High School, Seymour

== Bee County ==
- A C Jones High School, Beeville
- Pettus High School, Pettus
- Skidmore-Tynan High School, Skidmore

== Bell County ==
- Academy High School, Little River
- Bartlett High School, Bartlett
- Harker Heights High School, Harker Heights
- Holland High School, Holland
- Rogers High School, Rogers
- Salado High School, Salado
- Troy High School, Troy

=== Belton ===
- Belton High School
- Belton New Tech High School

=== Killeen ===
- Chaparral High School
- Ellison High School
- Killeen High School
- Shoemaker High School

=== Temple ===
==== Public Schools ====
- Lake Belton High School
- Temple High School
- Wheatley Alternative Education Center

==== Private Schools ====
- Central Texas Christian School
- Holy Trinity Catholic High School

== Bexar County ==
- Judson High School, Converse
- Pieper High School, Timberwood Park
- Randolph High School, Randolph AFB

=== Castle Hills ===
- Antonian College Preparatory High School
- The Christian School at Castle Hills

=== San Antonio ===
==== Alamo Heights Independent School District ====
- Alamo Heights High School
- Bexar County JJAEP (6-12)

==== East Central Independent School District ====
- Bexar County Learning Center
- East Central High School
- CAST Lead High School

==== Edgewood Independent School District ====
- Edgewood Fine Arts Academy
- Kennedy High School
- Memorial High School

==== Fort Sam Houston Independent School District ====
- Cole High School

==== Harlandale Independent School District ====
- Harlandale High School
- McCollum High School
- STEM Early College High School
- Tejeda Academy

==== Judson Independent School District ====
- Wagner High School
- Veterans Memorial High School

==== Lackland Independent School District ====
- Stacey High School (Lackland AFB)

==== North East Independent School District ====
- Academy of Creative Education
- Churchill High School
- Johnson High School
- LEE High School
  - International School of the Americas
  - North East School of the Arts
  - STEM Academy
- MacArthur High School
  - Electrical Systems Technology Academy
- Madison High School
  - Agriscience Magnet Program
- Reagan High School
- Roosevelt High School
  - Design and Technology Academy
  - Engineering & Technologies Academy
  - Space & Engineering Technologies Academy

==== Northside Independent School District ====
- Brandeis High School
- Brennan High School
- Chavez Excel Academy High School
- Clark High School
- Harlan High School
- Health Careers High School
- Holmgreen Center
- Holmes High School
  - NSITE High School
- Jay High School
- John Jay Science and Engineering Academy
- Marshall High School
  - Law and Medical Services Magnet School
- Northside Alternative High School
- O'Connor High School
  - Agriculture Science & Technology Academy
- Reddix Center
- Sotomayor High School
- Stevens High School
  - CAST Teach High School
- Taft High School
  - Communications Arts High School
- Warren High School
  - Construction Careers Academy

==== San Antonio Independent School District ====
- Advanced Learning Academy at Fox Tech (PK–12)
- Brackenridge High School
- Brewer Academy (6-12)
- Burbank High School
- CAST Tech High School
- Cooper Academy at Navarro
- Edison High School
- Estrada Alternative Center (7-12)
- Fox Tech High School
- Highlands High School
- James Fenimore Cooper Academy (K-12)
- Jefferson High School
- Lanier High School
- Sam Houston High School
- Phoenix Middle College (10-12)
- St. Philip's Early College High School
- Travis Early College High School
- Young Women's Leadership Academy

==== South San Antonio Independent School District ====
- South San Antonio High School

==== Southside Independent School District ====
- Southside High School

==== Southwest Independent School District ====
- CAST STEM High School
- Southwest High School
- Southwest Legacy High School

==== Somerset Independent School District ====
- Somerset High School
- Zacharias Early College Leadership Academy

==== Charter Schools ====
- Anne Frank Inspire Academy
- BASIS Schools San Antonio
- Brooks Academy of Science and Engineering
- Brooks Collegiate Academy
- Compass Rose Charter School Legacy Campus
- Early College High School at Texas A&M University-San Antonio
- Gervin Charter Academy
- Great Hearts Schools (Monte Vista North, Northern Oaks)
- Harmony Science Academy - San Antonio
- IDEA Charter Schools (Brackenridge, Carver, Eastside, Ewing Halsell, Ingram Hills, Judson, Mays, Monterrey Park, Najim, South Flores, Walzem)
- Jubilee Charter Academies (Highland Hills, Highland Park, Lake View, Livingway, San Antonio, Sendero, Westwood)
- KIPP Texas Public Schools (Somos, University Prep)
- Lee Academy of Science and Engineering
- Madla Early College High School
- Por Vida Charter High School
- Sanchez Charter High School
- School of Science & Technology - San Antonio
- Southwest Prep Schools (New Directions, Southeast, Seguin)
- Texans Can Academy - San Antonio

==== Private Schools ====
- Central Catholic Marianist High School
- Cornerstone Christian School
- Holy Cross High School
- Incarnate Word High School
- Keystone School
- Legacy Christian Academy
- Lutheran High School of San Antonio
- Providence High School
- St. Anthony Catholic High School
- St. Gerard Catholic High School
- Saint Mary's Hall
- San Antonio Christian School
- San Juan Diego Catholic High School
- TMI Episcopal

=== Universal City ===
- First Baptist Academy

== Blanco County ==
- Blanco High School, Blanco
- Lyndon B. Johnson High School, Johnson City

== Borden County ==
- Borden County High School, Gail

== Bosque County ==
- Clifton High School, Clifton
- Cranfills Gap High School, Cranfills Gap
- Iredell High School, Iredell
- Kopperl High School, Kopperl
- Meridian High School, Meridian
- Morgan High School, Morgan
- Walnut Springs High School, Walnut Springs

== Bowie County ==
- James Bowie High School, Simms
- Dekalb High School, Dekalb
- Hooks High School, Hooks
- Maud High School, Maud
- New Boston High School, New Boston
- Redwater High School, Redwater

=== Texarkana ===
- Liberty-Eylau High School
- Pleasant Grove High School
- Premier Charter School - Texarkana
- Texas High School

== Brazoria County ==
- Alvin High School, Alvin
- Brazosport Christian School, Lake Jackson
- Brazosport High School, Freeport
- Columbia High School, West Columbia
- Danbury High School, Danbury
- Iowa Colony High School, Iowa Colony
- Manvel High School, Manvel
- Sweeny High School, Sweeny

=== Angleton ===
- Angleton High School
- Trinity Charter Schools - Angleton

=== Clute ===
- Brazoswood High School
- Lighthouse Alternative Learning Center

=== Pearland ===
- Glenda Dawson High School
- Pearland High School
- Robert Turner College and Career High School
- Shadow Creek High School

== Brazos County ==
=== Bryan ===
- Allen Academy
- Brazos Christian School
- Bryan Collegiate High School
- Bryan High School
- Harmony Science Academy - Bryan/College Station
- James Earl Rudder High School
- St. Joseph Catholic High School

=== College Station ===
- A&M Consolidated High School
- College Station High School
- International Leadership Academy of Texas - Aggieland

== Brewster County ==
- Alpine High School, Alpine
- Marathon High School, Marathon
- Big Bend High School, Terlingua

== Briscoe County ==
- Silverton High School, Silverton

== Brooks County ==
- Falfurrias High School, Falfurrias

== Brown County ==
- Bangs High School, Bangs
- Blanket High School, Blanket
- Brookesmith High School, Brookesmith
- Brownwood High School, Brownwood
- May High School, May
- Zephyr High School, Zephyr

=== Early ===
- Early High School
- Premier Charter School - Early

== Burleson County ==
- Caldwell High School, Caldwell
- Snook High School, Snook
- Somerville High School, Somerville

== Burnet County ==
- Burnet High School, Burnet

=== Marble Falls ===
- Faith Academy
- Falls Career High School
- Marble Falls High School

== Caldwell County ==
- Lockhart High School, Lockhart
- Luling High School, Luling
- Prairie Lea High School, Prairie Lea

== Calhoun County ==
=== Port Lavaca ===
- Calhoun High School
- Hope High School

== Callahan County ==
- Baird High School, Baird
- Clyde High School, Clyde
- Cross Plains High School, Cross Plains
- Eula High School, Eula

== Cameron County ==
- La Feria High School, La Feria
- Los Fresnos High School, Los Fresnos
- Port Isabel High School, Port Isabel
- Rio Hondo High School, Rio Hondo
- Santa Maria High School, Santa Maria
- Santa Rosa High School, Santa Rosa

=== Brownsville ===
- Brownsville Academic Center
- Brownsville Early College High School
- Brownsville Learning Academy
- First Baptist School
- Hanna High School
- Harmony School of Innovation - Brownsville
- IDEA Schools (Brownsville, Frontier, Riverview, Sports Park)
- Jubilee Charter Academy - Brownsville
- Lincoln Park Alternative School
- Lopez High School
- Pace High School
- Porter High School
- Premier Charter School - Brownsville
- Saint Joseph Academy
- Rivera High School
- Triumph School Brownsville
- Veterans Memorial High School

=== Harlingen ===
- Harlingen Collegiate High School
- Harlingen High School
- Harlingen High School South
- Harlingen School of Health Professions
- Jubilee Charter Academy - Harlingen
- KEYS Academy
- Marine Military Academy
- Secondary Alternative Center

=== San Benito ===
- IDEA Schools - San Benito
- San Benito High School
- Triumph School - San Benito

== Camp County ==
- Pittsburg High School, Pittsburg

== Carson County ==
- Groom High School, Groom
- Panhandle High School, Panhandle
- White Deer High School, White Deer

== Cass County ==
- Atlanta High School, Atlanta
- Avinger High School, Avinger
- Bloomburg High School, Bloomburg
- Hughes Springs High School, Hughes Springs
- Linden-Kildare High School, Linden
- McLeod High School, McLeod
- Queen City High School, Queen City

== Castro County ==
- Dimmitt High School, Dimmitt
- Hart Junior-Senior High School, Hart
- Nazareth High School, Nazareth

== Chambers County ==
- Anahuac High School, Anahuac
- Barbers Hill High School, Mont Belvieu
- East Chambers High School, Winnie

== Cherokee County ==
- Alto High School, Alto
- Bullard High School, Bullard
- Jacksonville High School, Jacksonville
- New Summerfield High School, New Summerfield
- Rusk High School, Rusk
- Wells High School, Wells

== Childress County ==
- Childress High School, Childress

== Clay County ==
- Bellevue High School, Bellevue
- Petrolia High School, Petrolia

=== Henrietta ===
- Henrietta High School
- Midway High School

== Cochran County ==
- Morton High School, Morton
- Whiteface High School, Whiteface

== Coke County ==
- Bronte High School, Bronte
- Robert Lee High School, Robert Lee

== Coleman County ==
- Coleman High School, Coleman
- Panther Creek High School, Valera
- Santa Anna High School, Santa Anna

== Collin County ==
- Allen High School, Allen
- Anna High School, Anna
- Blue Ridge High School, Blue Ridge
- Celina High School, Celina
- Community High School, Nevada
- Farmersville High School, Farmersville
- McMillen High School, Murphy
- Melissa High School, Melissa
- Princeton High School, Princeton

=== Frisco ===
- Founders Classical Academy - Frisco
- Frisco High School
- Centennial High School
- Heritage High School
- Independence High School
- Leadership Prep School
- Lebanon Trail High School
- Legacy Christian Academy
- Liberty High School
- Lone Star High School
- Memorial High School
- Panther Creek High School
- Reedy High School
- Rock Hill High School (Prosper ISD)
- Wakeland High School

=== Lucas ===
- Lovejoy High School
- Lucas Christian Academy

=== McKinney ===
- Cornerstone Christian Academy
- Emerson High School (Frisco ISD)
- McKinney High School
- McKinney Boyd High School
- McKinney Christian Academy
- McKinney North High School

=== Plano ===
- Clark High School
- Coram Deo Academy - Plano
- Faith Lutheran School
- Jasper High School (Plano, Texas)
- John Paul II High School
- Legacy Prep - Plano
- Plano East Senior High School
- Plano ISD Academy High School
- Plano Senior High School
- Plano West Senior High School
- Shepton High School
- Spring Creek Academy
- Vines High School
- Williams High School

=== Prosper ===
- Prestonwood Christian Academy
- Prestonwood Christian Academy-North
- Prosper High School

=== Wylie ===
- Achieve Alternative Academy
- Wylie East High School
- Wylie High School
- Wylie Preparatory Academy

== Collingsworth County ==
- Wellington High School, Wellington

== Colorado County ==
- Columbus High School, Columbus
- Rice High School, Altair
- Weimar High School, Weimar

== Comal County ==
- Bracken Christian School, Bulverde
- Canyon Lake High School, Fischer
- Davenport High School, Garden Ridge
- Smithson Valley High School, Spring Branch

=== New Braunfels ===
- Calvary Baptist Academy
- Canyon High School
- New Braunfels Christian Academy
- New Braunfels High School
- Premier Charter School - New Braunfels

=== Schertz ===
- Founders Classical Academy - Schertz
- John Paul II Catholic High School

== Comanche County ==
- De Leon High School, De Leon
- Gustine High School, Gustine
- Sidney High School, Sidney

=== Comanche ===
- Comanche High School
- Premier Charter School - Comanche

== Concho County ==
- Eden High School, Eden
- Paint Rock High School, Paint Rock

== Cooke County ==
- Callisburg High School, Callisburg
- Era High School, Era
- Gainesville High School, Gainesville
- Lindsay High School (Texas), Lindsay
- Valley View High School, Valley View

=== Muenster ===
- Muenster High School
- Sacred Heart Catholic High School

== Coryell County ==
- Copperas Cove High School, Copperas Cove
- Evant High School, Evant
- Jonesboro School, Jonesboro
- Gatesville High School, Gatesville
- Oglesby High School, Oglesby

== Cottle County ==
- Paducah High School, Paducah

== Crane County ==
- Crane High School, Crane

== Crockett County ==
- Ozona High School, Ozona

== Crosby County ==
- Crosbyton High School, Crosbyton
- Lorenzo High School, Lorenzo
- Ralls High School, Ralls

== Culberson County ==
- Van Horn High School, Van Horn

== Dallam County ==
- Dalhart High School, Dalhart
- Texline High School, Texline

== Dallas County ==
- Golden Rule Charter Schools - Wilmer, Wilmer
- Highland Park High School, University Park
- Lancaster High School, Lancaster
- Rowlett High School, Rowlett
- Sachse High School, Sachse
- Sunnyvale High School, Sunnyvale

=== Addison ===
- Greenhill School
- Trinity Christian Academy

=== Balch Springs ===
- Balch Springs Christian Academy
- KIPP Pleasant Grove Leadership Academy

=== Cedar Hill ===
- Cedar Hill High School
- Cedar Hill Preparatory Academy
- Newman International Academy - Cedar Hill
- Trinity Christian School

=== Carrollton ===
- Creekview High School
- Harmony Science Academy - Carrollton
- Newman Smith High School
- Prince of Peace Christian School
- The Saint Anthony School
- Texans Can Academy - Carrollton/Farmers Branch
- Turner High School

=== Coppell ===
- Coppell Classical Academy
- Coppell High School
- Universal Academy - Coppell

=== Dallas ===
==== Public Schools ====
- Adams High School
- Adamson High School
- Carter High School
- Conrad High School
- Hillcrest High School
- Jefferson High School
- Kimball High School
- Lake Highlands High School
- Lincoln High School
- Madison High School
- Molina High School
- North Dallas High School
- Pinkston High School
- Roosevelt High School
- Samuell High School
- Seagoville High School
- Smith High School
- South Oak Cliff High School
- Spruce High School
- Sunset High School
- White High School
- Wilson High School

==== Career/Magnet High Schools ====
- Angelou High School
- Darrell New Tech High School
- Gilliam Collegiate Academy
- Harmony Science Academy/Harmony School of Innovation - Dallas
- Lassiter Early College High School
- Obama Male Leadership Academy
- Rangel Young Women's Leadership School
- Skyline High School
- Townview Magnet Center
- Washington Performing/Visual Arts High School

==== Charter Schools ====
- A+ Charter Schools (A+ Academy, Inspired Vision)
- Cityscape Schools (Buckner, East Grand)
- Clay Classical Academy
- Gateway Charter Academy
- Golden Rule Charter Schools (Pleasant Grove, Sunnyside)
- Life School - Oak Cliff
- Pegasus School of Liberal Arts & Sciences
- Pioneer Technology & Arts Academy
- Richland Collegiate High School
- Texans Can Academy (Garland, Grant East, North, Oak Cliff, Pleasant Grove)
- UME Prep Academy
- Uplift Charter Schools (Atlas, Hampton, Heights, Luna, Williams, Wisdom)
- Winfree Academy Dallas

==== Private Schools ====
- Alcuin School
- Bishop Dunne Catholic School
- Bishop Lynch High School
- The Cambridge School of Dallas
- The Covenant School
- Cristo Rey Dallas College Prep
- Dallas Academy
- Dallas International School
- Dallas Lutheran School
- Episcopal School of Dallas
- Fairhill School
- Faith Family Academy
- First Baptist Academy of Dallas
- The Hockaday School
- Jesuit College Preparatory School of Dallas
- June Shelton School
- Kingdom Collegiate Academies
- Lakehill Preparatory School
- Logos Academy
- Mesorah High School for Girls
- Parish Episcopal School
- St. Mark's School of Texas
- Ursuline Academy of Dallas
- The Westwood School
- The Winston School
- Yavneh Academy of Dallas

=== DeSoto ===
- DeSoto High School/DeSoto High School-Freshman Campus
- Golden Rule Charter Schools - DeSoto Secondary
- International Leadership Academy of Texas - Lancaster-DeSoto
- Premier Charter School - DeSoto

=== Duncanville ===
- Duncanville High School
- Village Tech School

=== Garland ===
- Brighter Horizons Academy
- Garland Christian Academy
- Garland High School
- Harmony School of Innovation - Garland
- International Leadership Academy of Texas - Garland
- Lakeview Centennial High School
- Naaman Forest High School
- North Garland High School
- South Garland High School

=== Grand Prairie ===
- Advantage Academy - Grand Prairie East
- Dubiski Career High School
- Golden Rule Charter Schools - Grand Prairie
- Grand Prairie Collegiate Institute
- Grand Prairie Fine Arts Academy
- Grand Prairie High School
- International Leadership of Texas - Arlington-Grand Prairie High School
- South Grand Prairie High School
- Uplift Schools - Grand Prairie
- Winfree Academy Grand Prairie
- Young Women's Leadership Academy at Arnold

=== Irving ===
- The Academy of Irving ISD
- Cistercian Preparatory School
- Great Hearts - Irving
- The Highlands School
- Irving High School
- Islamic School of Irving
- MacArthur High School
- Nimitz High School
- North Lake Early College High School
- Premier Charter School - Irving
- Ranchview High School
- StoneGate Christian Academy
- Universal Academy - Irving
- Uplift Schools (Infinity, North Hills)
- Winfree Academy Irving

=== Mesquite ===
- Dallas Christian School
- Founders Classical Academy - Mesquite
- Horn High School
- Legacy Prep (Mesquite, West)
- Mesquite High School
- North Mesquite High School
- Poteet High School
- Premier Charter School - Mesquite
- Vanderbilt High School
- West Mesquite High School

=== Richardson ===
- Berkner High School
- Canyon Creek Christian Academy
- Evolution Academy Richardson
- IANT Quranic Academy
- North Dallas Adventist Academy
- Pearce High School
- Richardson High School
- Salam Academy
- Winfree Academy Richardson

== Dawson County ==
- Dawson High School, Welch
- Sands High School, Ackerly

=== Lamesa ===
- Klondike High School
- Lamesa High School

== Deaf Smith County ==
- Hereford High School, Hereford

== Delta County ==
- Cooper High School, Cooper

== Denton County ==
- Aubrey High School, Aubrey
- Byron Nelson High School, Trophy Club
- The Colony High School, The Colony
- Krum High School, Krum
- Little Elm High School, Little Elm
- Northwest High School, Justin
- Pilot Point High School, Pilot Point
- Ponder High School, Ponder
- Prestonwood Christian Academy, Plano
- Sanger High School, Sanger

=== Argyle ===
- Argyle High School
- Liberty Christian School

=== Carrollton ===
- Creekview High School
- Hebron High School

=== Corinth ===
- Founders Classical Academy - Corinth
- Lake Dallas High School

=== Denton ===
- Braswell High School
- Denton Calvary Academy
- Denton High School
- Guyer High School
- Moore High School
- Ryan High School
- Selwyn School
- Texas Academy of Mathematics and Science

=== Flower Mound ===
- Coram Deo Academy - Flower Mound
- Flower Mound High School
- Marcus High School
- Temple Christian Academy

=== Haslet ===
- Eaton High School
- Legacy Classical Christian Academy

=== Lewisville ===
- Founders Classical Academy - Lewisville
- iSchool of Lewisville
- Lewisville High School
- Winfree Academy Lewisville

== Dewitt County ==
- Cuero High School, Cuero
- Nordheim High School, Nordheim
- Yoakum High School, Yoakum
- Yorktown High School, Yorktown

== Dickens County ==
- Patton Springs High School, Afton
- Spur High School, Spur

== Dimmit County ==
- Carrizo Springs High School, Carrizo Springs

== Donley County ==
- Clarendon High School, Clarendon
- Hedley High School, Hedley

== Duval County ==
- Benavides High School, Benavides
- Freer High School, Freer
- San Diego High School, San Diego

== Eastland County ==
- Cisco High School, Cisco
- Eastland High School, Eastland
- Gorman High School, Gorman
- Ranger High School, Ranger
- Rising Star High School, Rising Star

== Ector County ==
=== Odessa ===
- George H.W. Bush New Tech Odessa
- Odessa High School
- Permian High School
- Premier Charter School - Odessa

== Edwards County ==
- Nueces Canyon High School, Barksdale
- Rocksprings High School, Rocksprings

== El Paso County ==
- Anthony High School, Anthony
- Canutillo High School, Canutillo
- San Elizario High School, San Elizario
- Tornillo High School, Tornillo

=== Clint ===
- Clint High School
- Horizon High School
- Mountain View High School

=== El Paso ===
==== Public Schools ====
- Americas High School
- Andress High School
- Austin High School
- Bel Air High School
- Bowie High School
- Burges High School
- Chapin High School
- College Career & Tech Academy
- Coronado High School
- Del Valle High School
- Eastlake High School
- Eastwood High School
- El Dorado High School
- El Paso High School
- Franklin High School
- Hanks High School
- Irvin High School
- Jefferson High School
- Montwood High School
- Parkland High School
- Pebble Hills High School
- Riverside High School
- Socorro High School
- Silva Health Magnet High School
- Transmountain Early College High School
- Ysleta High School

==== Charter/Private Schools ====
- Cathedral High School
- César Chávez Academy
- El Paso Academy East/West
- Father Yermo High School
- Founders Classical Academy - El Paso
- Harmony Science Academy/Harmony School of Innovation - El Paso
- KEYS Academy
- Loretto Academy
- Lydia Patterson Institute
- Plato Academy
- Premier Charter School (Eastpointe, Mesa)
- Radford School
- Triumph School (East, West)

=== Fabens ===
- Cotton Valley Early College High School
- Fabens High School

== Ellis County ==
- Avalon High School, Avalon
- Ennis High School, Ennis
- Ferris High School, Ferris
- Italy High School, Italy
- Maypearl High School, Maypearl
- Milford High School, Milford
- Ovilla Christian School, Ovilla
- Palmer High School, Palmer
- Red Oak High School, Red Oak

=== Midlothian ===
- Midlothian High School
- Midlothian Heritage High School

=== Waxahachie ===
- Waxahachie High School
- Waxahachie Global High School
- Life School - Waxahachie
- Waxahachie High School of Choice
- Waxahachie Preparatory School

== Erath County ==
- Dublin High School, Dublin
- Huckabay High School, Huckabay
- Lingleville High School, Lingleville
- Stephenville High School, Stephenville

== Falls County ==
- Chilton High School, Chilton
- Marlin High School, Marlin
- Rosebud-Lott High School, Rosebud

== Fannin County ==
- Bonham High School, Bonham
- Dodd City High School, Dodd City
- Ector High School, Ector
- Fannindel High School, Ladonia
- Honey Grove High School, Honey Grove
- Leonard High School, Leonard
- Sam Rayburn High School, Ivanhoe
- Savoy High School, Savoy
- Trenton High School, Trenton

== Fayette County ==
- Fayetteville High School, Fayetteville
- Flatonia Secondary School, Flatonia
- La Grange High School, La Grange
- Round Top-Carmine High School, Carmine
- Schulenburg High School, Schulenburg

== Fisher County ==
- Roby High School, Roby
- Rotan High School, Rotan

== Floyd County ==
- Floydada High School, Floydada
- Lockney High School, Lockney

== Foard County ==
- Crowell High School, Crowell

== Fort Bend County ==
- Needville High School, Needville
- Stafford High School, Stafford
- Willowridge High School, Houston

=== Fulshear ===
- Fulshear High School
- Jordan High School

=== Missouri City ===
- Elkins High School
- Hightower High School
- Marshall High School

=== Richmond ===
- Foster High School
- International Leadership Academy of Texas - Katy-Westpark
- Randle High School

=== Rosenberg ===
- Lamar Consolidated High School
- Terry High School

=== Sugar Land ===
- Clements High School
- Dulles High School
- Fort Bend Christian Academy
- Harmony School of Innovation - Sugar Land
- Logos Preparatory Academy
- Kempner High School

=== Unincorporated Fort Bend County ===
- Austin High School
- Bush High School
- Cinco Ranch High School
- George Ranch High School
- Ridge Point High School
- Seven Lakes High School
- Travis High School
- Tompkins High School

== Franklin County ==
- Mount Vernon High School, Mount Vernon

== Freestone County ==
- Fairfield High School, Fairfield
- Teague High School, Teague
- Wortham High School, Wortham

== Frio County ==
- Dilley High School, Dilley
- Pearsall High School, Pearsall

== Gaines County ==
- Loop High School, Loop
- Seagraves High School, Seagraves
- Seminole High School, Seminole

== Galveston County ==
- Clear Lake High School, Houston
- Clear View High School Webster
- Dickinson High School, Dickinson
- High Island High School, High Island
- Hitchcock High School, Hitchcock
- La Marque High School, La Marque
- Santa Fe High School, Santa Fe
- Texas City High School, Texas City

=== Friendswood ===
- Clear Brook High School
- Friendswood High School

=== Galveston ===
- Ball High School
- O'Connell College Preparatory School

=== League City ===
- Bay Area Christian School
- Clear Creek High School
- Clear Falls High School
- Clear Path Alternative School
- Clear Springs High School

== Garza County ==
- Post High School, Post
- Southland High School, Southland

== Gillespie County ==
- Fredericksburg High School, Fredericksburg
- Harper High School, Harper

== Glasscock County ==
- Garden City High School, Garden City

== Goliad County ==
- Goliad High School, Goliad

== Gonzales County ==
- Gonzales High School, Gonzales
- Nixon-Smiley High School, Nixon
- Waelder High School, Waelder

== Gray County ==
- Lefors High School, Lefors
- McLean High School, McLean
- Pampa High School, Pampa

== Grayson County ==
- Bells High School, Bells
- Collinsville High School, Collinsville
- Denison High School, Denison
- Gunter High School, Gunter
- Howe High School, Howe
- Pottsboro High School, Pottsboro
- S&S Consolidated High School, Sadler
- Tioga High School, Tioga
- Tom Bean High School, Tom Bean
- Van Alstyne High School, Van Alstyne
- Whitesboro High School, Whitesboro
- Whitewright High School, Whitewright

=== Sherman ===
- Sherman High School
- Texoma Christian School

== Gregg County ==
=== Gladewater ===
- Gladewater High School
- Sabine High School

=== Kilgore ===
- Kilgore High School, Kilgore

=== White Oak ===
- White Oak High School, White Oak

=== Longview ===
- East Texas Charter High School
- Longview Christian School
- Longview High School
- Pine Tree High School
- Premier Charter School - Longview
- Spring Hill High School
- Trinity School of Texas

== Grimes County ==
- Anderson-Shiro High School, Anderson
- Iola High School, Iola
- Navasota High School, Navasota
- Richards High School, Richards

== Guadalupe County ==
- Marion High School, Marion
- Navarro High School, Geronimo
- Byron P. Steele II High School, Cibolo

=== Schertz ===
- Samuel Clemens High School
- Allison Steele Enrichment Center

=== Seguin ===
- Lifegate Christian School
- Seguin High School

== Hale County ==
- Abernathy High School, Abernathy
- Cotton Center High School, Cotton Center
- Hale Center High School, Hale Center
- Petersburg High School, Petersburg
- Plainview High School, Plainview

== Hall County ==
- Memphis High School, Memphis
- Valley High School, Turkey

== Hamilton County ==
- Jonesboro High School, Jonesboro
- Hamilton High School, Hamilton
- Hico High School, Hico

== Hansford County ==
- Gruver High School, Gruver
- Spearman High School, Spearman

== Hardeman County ==
- Chillicothe High School, Chillicothe
- Quanah High School, Quanah

== Hardin County ==
- Hardin-Jefferson High School, Sour Lake
- Kountze High School, Kountze
- Lumberton High School, Lumberton
- Silsbee High School, Silsbee
- West Hardin High School, Saratoga

== Harris County ==
- Channelview High School/Kolarik 9th Grade Center, Channelview
- The Chinquapin School, Highlands
- Clear Brook High School, Friendswood
- Crosby High School, Crosby
- Deer Park High School, Deer Park
- Galena Park High School, Galena Park
- Hargrave High School, Huffman
- Humble High School, Humble
- Jersey Village High School, Jersey Village
- The Kinkaid School, Piney Point Village
- Klein High School, Klein
- La Porte High School, La Porte
- Memorial High School, Hedwig Village
- Northeast Christian Academy, Kingwood
- Providence Classical School, Spring
- South Houston High School, South Houston

=== Baytown ===
- Baytown Christian Academy
- Goose Creek Memorial High School
- Lee High School
- Sterling High School

=== Bellaire ===
- Bellaire High School
- Episcopal High School

=== Cypress ===
- Covenant Academy
- Cypress Park High School
- Cypress Ranch High School
- Cypress Springs High School
- Cypress Woods High School
- Bridgeland High School

=== Houston ===
==== Public Schools ====
- Aldine High School
- Alief Elsik High School
- Alief Hastings High School
- Alief Kerr High School
- Alief Taylor High School
- Austin High School
- Blanson Career/Tech High School
- Carnegie Vanguard High School
- Carver High School for Applied Technology
- Challenge Early College High School
- Chávez High School
- Clear Lake High School
- Davis High School
- DeBakey High School for Health Professions
- Dobie High School
- East Early College High School
- Eastwood Academy
- Eisenhower High School
- Energy Institute High School
- Forest Brook High School
- Furr High School
- Heights High School
- High School for Law and Justice
- Houston Academy for International Studies
- Jordan Career Center
- Kashmere High School
- Kinder Performing/Visual Arts High School
- Kingwood High School
- Kingwood Park High School
- Lamar High School
- Liberty Alternative High School
- MacArthur High School
- Madison High School
- Milby High School
- Nimitz High School
- North Forest High School
- North Houston Early College High School
- North Shore Senior High School
- Northbrook High School
- Northside High School
- Rogers Alternative School
- Sam Houston High School
- Scarborough High School
- Sharpstown High School
- Smiley High School
- South Early College High School
- Spring Woods High School
- Sterling High School
- Stratford High School
- Victory Early College High School
- Waltrip High School
- Washington High School
- Westbury High School
- Westchester Academy for International Studies
- Westside High School
- Wheatley High School
- Wisdom High School
- Worthing High School
- Yates High School

=== Charter Schools ===
- Beta Academy
- Harmony Public Schools (Advancement, Discovery, Ingenuity, Science Academy)
- Houston Heights High School
- International Leadership Academy of Texas - Windmill Lakes-Orem
- KIPP Texas Public Schools (Connect, East End, Generations, Northeast, Sunnyside)
- Premier Charter School (Champions, Gallery, Hobby, Sharpstown)
- Pro-Vision Academy
- Sanchez Charter Schools (East End, Northside)
- Ser-Niños High School
- Texans Can Academy (Hobby, North, Southwest)
- YES Prep Public Schools (Bray Oaks, East End, Eisenhower, Fifth Ward, Gulfton, North Central, North Forest, Northbrook, Northside, Southeast, Southside, Southwest, West, White Oak)
- Yzaguirre School for Success

==== Private Schools ====
- Al-Hadi School of Accelerative Learning
- Archway Academy
- Awty International School
- Beren Academy
- British International School of Houston
- The Covenant Preparatory School
- Cristo Rey Jesuit College Preparatory of Houston
- Duchesne Academy
- The Emery/Weiner School
- Grace Christian Academy
- Houston Christian High School
- Houston Heights High School
- Iman Academy
- Incarnate Word Academy
- Islamic Education Institute of Texas
- Lutheran North Academy
- Lutheran South Academy
- Mount Carmel High School
- Northland Christian School
- The Oaks Adventist Christian School
- Saint Agnes Academy
- St. Francis Episcopal School (Piney Point Village, Houston)
- St. John's School
- St. Pius X High School
- St. Thomas' Episcopal School
- St. Thomas High School
- School of the Woods
- Second Baptist School
- Strake Jesuit College Preparatory
- St. Stephen's Episcopal School Houston
- The Village School
- Westbury Christian School
- Xavier Educational Academy

=== Katy ===
- Aristoi Classical Academy
- Calvin Nelms Charter High School
- Faith West Academy
- Harmony School of Innovation - Katy
- Katy High School
- Mirus Academy
- Pope John XXIII High School

=== League City ===
- Clear Creek High School
- Clear Falls High School
- Clear Springs High School

=== Pasadena ===
- First Baptist Christian Academy-Pasadena
- Pasadena High School
- Pasadena Memorial High School
- Rayburn High School

=== Tomball ===
- Concordia Lutheran High School
- Tomball High School
- Tomball Memorial High

=== Unincorporated Harris County ===
==== Public ====
- Atascocita High School
- Bridgeland High School
- Cy-Fair High School
- Cypress Creek High School
- Cypress Falls High School
- Cypress Lakes High School
- Cypress Ridge High School
- Dekaney High School
- King High School
- Klein Collins High School
- Klein Forest High School
- Klein Oak High School
- Langham Creek High School
- Mayde Creek High School
- Morton Ranch High School
- Paetow High School
- Quest High School
- Spring High School
- Summer Creek High School
- Taylor High School
- Westfield High School
- Windfern High School
- Wunsche High School

==== Private ====
- Cypress Christian School
- Faith West Academy
- Family Christian Academy
- Rosehill Christian School

== Harrison County ==
- Elysian Fields High School, Elysian Fields
- Hallsville High School, Hallsville
- Harleton High School, Harleton
- Marshall High School, Marshall
- Waskom High School, Waskom

== Hartley County ==
- Channing High School, Channing
- Hartley High School, Hartley

== Haskell County ==
- Rule High School, Rule

=== Haskell ===
- Haskell High School, Haskell
- Paint Creek High School, Haskell

== Hays County ==
- Dripping Springs High School, Dripping Springs
- Hays High School, Buda
- Veritas Academy, Austin

=== Kyle ===
- Lehman High School
- Valor Academy - Kyle

=== San Marcos ===
- Ki Charter Academy
- San Marcos Baptist Academy
- San Marcos High School

=== Wimberley ===
- Katherine Anne Porter School
- Wimberley High School

== Hemphill County ==
- Canadian High School, Canadian

== Henderson County ==
- Brownsboro High School, Brownsboro
- Cross Roads High School, Cross Roads
- Eustace High School, Eustace
- LaPoynor High School, Larue
- Malakoff High School, Malakoff
- Trinidad High School, Trinidad

=== Athens ===
- Athens Christian Preparatory Academy
- Athens High School

== Hidalgo County ==
- Edcouch-Elsa High School, Edcouch
- Hidalgo High School, Hidalgo
- La Villa High School, La Villa
- Monte Alto High School, Monte Alto
- Premier Charter School - Palmview, Palmview
- Progreso High School, Progreso

=== Alamo ===
- Pharr-San Juan-Alamo Memorial High School
- Valley Christian Heritage School
- Vanguard Charter Academy - Mozart

=== Donna ===
- IDEA Schools - Donna
- Donna High School

=== San Juan ===
- IDEA Schools - San Juan
- Pharr-San Juan-Alamo North High School
- Premier Charter School - San Juan

=== Edinburg ===
- Economedes High School
- Edinburg High School
- Edinburg North High School
- IDEA Schools (Edinburg, Quest, Toros)
- Premier Charter School - Edinburg Career/Tech Center
- South Texas Business, Education & Technology Academy
- Vanguard Charter Academy - Beethoven
- Vela High School

=== La Joya ===
- Juarez-Lincoln High School
- La Joya High School

=== McAllen ===
- Achieve Early College High School
- IDEA Schools (McAllen, Tres Lagos)
- Lamar Academy
- McAllen High School
- McAllen Memorial High School
- Rowe High School
- Triumph School - McAllen

=== Mercedes ===
- Mercedes High School
- The Science Academy of South Texas (SciTech)
- South Texas High School for Health Professions (Med High)
- Triumph School Mercedes

=== Mission ===
- IDEA Schools (Mission, North Mission)
- Mission High School
- Palmview High School
- Premier Charter School - Mission
- Sharyland High School
- Veterans Memorial High School

=== Pharr ===
- IDEA Schools - Pharr
- Jefferson T-Stem Early College High School
- Pharr-San Juan-Alamo High School
- Pharr-San Juan-Alamo Southwest High School
- Valley View High School
- Vanguard Charter Academy - Rembrandt

=== Weslaco ===
- IDEA Schools (Alamo, Weslaco, Weslaco Pike)
- Charter School - Weslaco
- South Palm Gardens High School
- Weslaco Alternative School
- Weslaco High School
- Weslaco East High School

== Hill County ==
- Abbott High School, Abbott
- Aquilla High School, Aquilla
- Blum High School, Blum
- Bynum High School, Bynum
- Covington High School, Covington
- Hillsboro High School, Hillsboro
- Hubbard High School, Hubbard
- Itasca High School, Itasca
- Mt. Calm High School, Mt Calm
- Penelope High School, Penelope
- Whitney High School, Whitney

== Hockley County ==
- Anton High School, Anton
- Levelland High School, Levelland
- Ropes High School, Ropesville
- Smyer High School, Smyer
- Sundown High School, Sundown
- Whitharral High School, Whitharral

== Hood County ==
- Lipan High School, Lipan
- Tolar High School, Tolar

=== Granbury ===
- Cornerstone Christian Academy
- Granbury High School
- Lone Star Success Academy
- North Central Texas Academy
- Premier Charter School - Granbury

== Hopkins County ==
- Cumby High School, Cumby
- Como-Pickton High School, Pickton
- Miller Grove High School, Miller Grove
- Saltillo High School, Saltillo
- Sulphur Bluff High School, Sulphur Bluff

=== Sulphur Springs ===
- North Hopkins High School
- Sulphur Springs High School

== Houston County ==
- Crockett High School, Crockett
- Grapeland High School, Grapeland
- Kennard High School, Kennard
- Latexo High School, Latexo
- Lovelady High School, Lovelady

== Howard County ==
- Big Spring High School, Big Spring
- Coahoma High School, Coahoma
- Forsan High School, Forsan

== Hudspeth County ==
- Dell City High School, Dell City
- Fort Hancock High School, Fort Hancock
- Sierra Blanca High School, Sierra Blanca

== Hunt County ==
- Bland High School, Merit
- Caddo Mills High School, Caddo Mills
- Campbell High School, Campbell
- Celeste High School, Celeste
- Commerce High School, Commerce
- Lone Oak High School, Lone Oak
- Royse City High School, Royse City
- Wolfe City High School, Wolfe City

=== Greenville ===
- Greenville Christian School
- Greenville High School

=== Quinlan ===
- Boles High School
- Ford High School

== Hutchinson County ==
- Borger High School, Borger
- Sanford-Fritch High School, Fritch
- West Texas High School, Stinnett

== Irion County ==
- Irion County High School, Mertzon

== Jack County ==
- Bryson High School, Bryson
- Jacksboro High School, Jacksboro
- Perrin-Whitt High School, Perrin

== Jackson County ==
- Edna High School, Edna
- Ganado High School, Ganado
- Industrial High School, Vanderbilt

== Jasper County ==
- Brookeland High School, Brookeland
- Buna High School, Buna
- Evadale High School, Evadale
- Jasper High School, Jasper
- Kirbyville High School, Kirbyville

== Jeff Davis County ==
- Fort Davis High School, Fort Davis
- Valentine High School, Valentine

== Jefferson County ==
- Hamshire-Fannett High School, Hamshire
- Nederland High School, Nederland
- Port Neches–Groves High School, Port Neches
- Sabine Pass High School, Sabine Pass

=== Beaumont ===
- Beaumont United High School
- Evolution Academy Beaumont
- Harmony Science Academy - Beaumont
- Legacy Christian Academy
- Monsignor Kelly Catholic High School
- Richard Milburn Academy
- Texas Academy for Leadership in the Humanities
- West Brook Senior High School

=== Port Arthur ===
- Bob Hope High School
- Memorial High School

== Jim Hogg County ==
- Hebbronville High School, Hebbronville

== Jim Wells County ==
- Ben Bolt-Palito Blanco High School, Ben Bolt
- Orange Grove High School, Orange Grove
- Premont High School, Premont

=== Alice ===
- Alice High School
- Alice Christian School

== Johnson County ==
- Alvarado High School, Alvarado
- Cleburne High School, Cleburne
- Godley High School, Godley
- Grandview High School, Grandview
- Joshua High School, Joshua
- Rio Vista High School, Rio Vista
- Venus High School, Venus

=== Burleson ===
- Burleson High School
- Centennial High School

=== Keene ===
- Chisholm Trail Academy
- Wanda R. Smith High School

== Jones County ==
- Anson High School, Anson
- Hamlin High School, Hamlin
- Hawley High School, Hawley
- Lueders-Avoca High School, Lueders
- Stamford High School, Stamford

== Karnes County ==
- Falls City High School, Falls City
- Karnes City High School, Karnes City
- Kenedy High School, Kenedy
- Runge High School, Runge

== Kaufman County ==
- Crandall High School, Crandall
- Kaufman High School, Kaufman
- Kemp High School, Kemp
- Mabank High School, Mabank
- Scurry-Rosser High School, Scurry

=== Forney ===
- Forney High School
- North Forney High School

=== Terrell ===
- Poetry Community Christian School
- Terrell High School

== Kendall County ==
- Comfort High School, Comfort

=== Boerne ===
- Boerne High School
- Champion High School
- Geneva School of Boerne

== Kerr County ==
- Center Point High School, Center Point
- Tom Moore High School, Ingram

=== Kerrville ===
- Our Lady of the Hills High School
- Tivy High School

== Kent County ==
- Jayton High School, Jayton

== Kimble County ==
- Junction High School, Junction

== King County ==
- Guthrie High School, Guthrie

== Kinney County ==
- Brackett High School, Brackettville

== Kleberg County ==
- Kaufer High School, Riviera

=== Kingsville ===
- Academy High School
- Jubilee Charter Academy - Kingsville
- King High School
- Presbyterian Pan American School

== Knox County ==
- Benjamin High School, Benjamin
- Knox City High School, Knox City
- Munday High School, Munday

== La Salle County ==
- Cotulla High School, Cotulla

== Lamar County ==
- Prairiland High School, Pattonville

=== Paris ===
- Chisum High School
- North Lamar High School
- Paris High School
- Trinity Christian Academy

== Lamb County ==
- Amherst High School, Amherst
- Littlefield High School, Littlefield
- Olton High School, Olton
- Springlake-Earth High School, Earth
- Sudan High School, Sudan

== Lampasas County ==
- Lampasas High School, Lampasas
- Lometa High School, Lometa

== Lavaca County ==
- Moulton High School, Moulton

=== Hallettsville ===
- Hallettsville High School
- Sacred Heart High School

=== Shiner ===
- Shiner Catholic School
- Shiner High School

== Lee County ==
- Dime Box High School, Dime Box
- Giddings High School, Giddings
- Lexington High School, Lexington

== Leon County ==
- Buffalo High School, Buffalo
- Centerville Junior-Senior High School, Centerville
- Leon High School, Jewett
- Normangee High School, Normangee
- Oakwood High School, Oakwood

== Liberty County ==
- Hardin High School, Hardin
- Hull-Daisetta High School, Daisetta
- Liberty High School (Texas), Liberty

=== Dayton ===
- Dayton High School
- Premier Charter School - Dayton

=== Cleveland ===
- Cleveland High School
- International Leadership Academy of Texas - Liberty
- Tarkington High School

== Limestone County ==
- Coolidge High School, Coolidge
- Groesbeck High School, Groesbeck
- Mexia High School, Mexia

== Lipscomb County ==
- Booker High School, Booker
- Darrouzett High School, Darrouzett
- Follett High School, Follett
- Higgins High School, Higgins

== Live Oak County ==
- George West High School, George West
- Three Rivers High School, Three Rivers

== Llano County ==
- Kingsland School, Kingsland
- Llano High School, Llano

== Lubbock County ==
- Frenship High School, Wolfforth
- Idalou High School, Idalou
- New Deal High School, New Deal
- Shallowater High School, Shallowater
- Slaton High School, Slaton

=== Lubbock ===
- All Saints Episcopal School
- Christ the King High School
- Cooper High School
- Coronado High School
- Estacado High School
- Kingdom Preparatory Academy
- Lubbock Christian High School
- Lubbock High School
- Monterey High School
- Premier Charter School (Briercroft, Lubbock)
- Roosevelt High School
- Southcrest Christian School
- Trinity Christian High School
- Triumph School Lubbock

== Lynn County ==
- New Home High School, New Home
- O'Donnell High School, O'Donnell
- Tahoka High School, Tahoka
- Wilson High School, Wilson

== Madison County ==
- Madisonville High School, Madisonville
- North Zulch High School, North Zulch

== Marion County ==
=== Jefferson ===
- Jefferson Christian Academy
- Jefferson High School

== Martin County ==
- Grady High School, Lenorah
- Stanton High School, Stanton

== Mason County ==
- Mason High School, Mason

== Matagorda County ==
- Bay City High School, Bay City
- Palacios High School, Palacios
- Tidehaven High School, El Maton
- Van Vleck High School, Van Vleck

== Maverick County ==
=== Eagle Pass ===
- Eagle Pass High School
- Winn High School

== McCulloch County ==
- Brady High School, Brady
- Lohn High School, Lohn
- Rochelle High School, Rochelle

== McLennan County ==
- Axtell High School, Axtell
- Bosqueville High School, Bosqueville
- Bruceville-Eddy High School, Eddy
- China Spring High School, China Spring
- Crawford High School, Crawford
- Gholson High School, Gholson
- Lorena High School, Lorena
- Mart High School, Mart
- McGregor High School, McGregor
- Moody High School, Moody
- Riesel High School, Riesel
- Robinson High School, Robinson
- Valley Mills High School, Valley Mills
- West High School, West

=== Waco ===
- Connally High School
- Eagle Christian Academy
- Harmony School of Innovation - Waco
- La Vega High School
- Live Oak Classical School
- Midway High School
- Premier Charter School - Waco
- Rapoport Academy Charter School
- Reicher Catholic High School
- University High School
- Vanguard College Preparatory School
- Waco High School

== McMullen County ==
- McMullen County High School, Tilden

== Medina County ==
- D'Hanis High School, D'Hanis
- Devine High School, Devine
- Hondo High School, Hondo
- Medina Valley High School, Castroville
- Natalia High School, Natalia

== Menard County ==
- Menard High School, Menard

== Midland County ==
=== Midland ===
- Coleman Alternative High School
- Greenwood High School
- Holy Cross Catholic High School
- Legacy High School
- Midland Classical Academy
- Midland Christian High School
- Midland High School
- Premier High School of Midland
- Texas Leadership Charter Academy - Midland
- Trinity High School of Midland

== Milam County ==
- Buckholts High School, Buckholts
- Milano High School, Milano
- Rockdale High School, Rockdale
- Thorndale High School, Thorndale
- Yoe High School, Cameron

== Mills County ==
- Goldthwaite High School, Goldthwaite
- Mullin High School, Mullin
- Priddy High School, Priddy
- Star School, Star

== Mitchell County ==
- Colorado High School, Colorado City
- Loraine High School, Loraine
- Westbrook High School, Westbrook

== Montague County ==
- Bowie High School, Bowie
- Forestburg High School, Forestburg
- Gold-Burg High School, Stoneburg
- Saint Jo High School, Saint Jo

=== Nocona ===
- Nocona High School
- Prairie Valley High School

== Montgomery County ==
- Splendora High School, Splendora

=== Conroe ===
- Caney Creek High School
- Conroe High School
- Covenant Christian School
- Oak Ridge High School

=== Magnolia ===
- Magnolia High School
- Magnolia West High School

=== Montgomery ===
- Lake Creek High School
- Montgomery High School

=== New Caney ===
- Infinity Early College High School
- New Caney High School
- Porter High School
- West Fork High School

=== Spring ===
- Evolution Academy Spring
- Frassati Catholic High School
- Grand Oaks High School

=== Willis ===
- Trinity Charter Schools - Willis
- Willis High School

=== The Woodlands ===
- Conroe ISD Academy of Science and Technology
- Cunae International School
- The John Cooper School
- Legacy Preparatory Christian Academy
- The Woodlands Christian Academy
- The Woodlands High School
- The Woodlands College Park High School

== Moore County ==
- Dumas High School, Dumas
- Sunray High School, Sunray

== Morris County ==
- Daingerfield High School, Daingerfield
- Pewitt High School, Omaha

== Motley County ==
- Motley County High School, Matador

== Nacogdoches County ==
- Central Heights High School, Central Heights
- Chireno High School, Chireno
- Cushing High School, Cushing
- Douglass High School, Douglass
- Garrison High School, Garrison
- Martinsville High School, Martinsville
- Woden High School, Woden

=== Nacogdoches ===
- Nacogdoches High School
- Regents Academy
- St. Boniface Catholic High School

== Navarro County ==
- Blooming Grove High School, Blooming Grove
- Corsicana High School, Corsicana
- Dawson High School, Dawson
- Frost High School, Frost
- Kerens High School, Kerens
- Mildred High School, Corsicana
- Rice High School, Rice

== Newton County ==
- Burkeville Junior-Senior High School, Burkeville
- Deweyville High School, Deweyville
- Newton High School, Newton

== Nolan County ==
- Blackwell High School, Blackwell
- Sweetwater High School, Sweetwater

=== Roscoe ===
- Highland High School
- Roscoe Collegiate High School

== Nueces County ==
- Agua Dulce High School, Agua Dulce
- Banquete High School, Banquete
- Bishop High School, Bishop
- Port Aransas High School, Port Aransas
- Robstown High School, Robstown

=== Corpus Christi ===
==== Public Schools ====
- Calallen High School
- Carroll High School
- Flour Bluff High School
- King High School
- London High School
- Miller High School
- Moody High School
- Ray High School
- Tuloso-Midway High School
- Veterans Memorial High School
- West Oso High School

=== Charter/Private Schools ===
- Annapolis Christian Academy
- Incarnate Word Academy
- St. John Paul II Academy
- Por Vida Academy - Corpus Christi
- Premier Charter School - Corpus Christi
- Richard Milburn Academy
- School of Science and Technology
- Trinity Charter Schools - Corpus Christi

== Ochiltree County ==
- Perryton High School, Perryton

== Oldham County ==
- Adrian High School, Adrian
- Boys Ranch High School, Boys Ranch
- Vega High School, Vega

== Orange County ==
- Bridge City High School, Bridge City
- Little Cypress-Mauriceville High School, Orange
- Orangefield High School, Orangefield
- Vidor High School, Vidor
- West Orange-Stark High School, West Orange

== Palo Pinto County ==
- Gordon High School, Gordon
- Graford High School, Graford
- Mineral Wells High School, Mineral Wells
- Santo High School, Santo
- Strawn High School, Strawn

== Panola County ==
- Beckville Junior-Senior High School, Beckville
- Gary High School, Gary

=== Carthage ===
- Carthage High School
- Panola Schools (Charter, Early College)

== Parker County ==
- Aledo High School, Aledo
- Brock High School, Brock
- Millsap High School, Millsap
- Peaster High School, Peaster
- Poolville High School, Poolville
- Springtown High School, Springtown
- Trinity Christian Academy, Willow Park

=== Weatherford ===
- Victory Baptist Academy
- Weatherford Christian School
- Weatherford High School

== Parmer County ==
- Bovina High School, Bovina
- Farwell High School, Farwell
- Friona High School, Friona
- Lazbuddie High School, Lazbuddie

== Pecos County ==
- Buena Vista High School, Imperial
- Fort Stockton High School, Fort Stockton
- Iraan High School, Iraan

== Polk County ==
- Big Sandy High School, Dallardsville
- Corrigan-Camden High School, Corrigan
- Goodrich High School, Goodrich
- Leggett High School, Leggett
- Livingston High School, Livingston
- Onalaska High School, Onalaska

== Potter County ==
- Bushland High School, Bushland

=== Amarillo ===
- Accelerate Christian School
- Highland Park High School
- Holy Cross Catholic Academy
- Palo Duro High School
- Premier Charter School - Amarillo
- River Road High School
- St. Andrew's Episcopal School
- San Jacinto Christian Academy
- Tascosa High School

== Presidio County ==
- Marfa High School, Marfa
- Presidio High School, Presidio

== Rains County ==
- Rains High School, Emory

== Randall County ==
=== Amarillo ===
- Amarillo High School
- Ascension Academy
- Caprock High School
- Randall High School

=== Canyon ===
- Canyon High School
- Premier Charter School - Canyon

== Reagan County ==
- Reagan County High School, Big Lake

== Real County ==
- Leakey High School, Leakey

== Red River County ==
- Avery High School, Avery
- Clarksville High School, Clarksville
- Detroit High School, Detroit
- Rivercrest High School, Bogata

== Reeves County ==
- Balmorhea High School, Balmorhea
- Pecos High School, Pecos

== Refugio County ==
- Austwell-Tivoli High School, Tivoli
- Refugio High School, Refugio
- Woodsboro High School, Woodsboro

== Roberts County ==
- Miami High School, Miami

== Robertson County ==
- Bremond High School, Bremond
- Calvert High School, Calvert
- Franklin High School, Franklin
- Hearne High School, Hearne
- Mumford High School, Mumford

== Rockwall County ==
- Rockwall-Heath High School, Heath
- Royse City High School, Royse City

=== Rockwall ===
- Heritage Christian Academy
- Providence Academy
- Rockwall High School

== Runnels County ==
- Ballinger High School, Ballinger
- Miles High School, Miles
- Winters High School, Winters

== Rusk County ==
- Carlisle High School, Price
- Henderson High School, Henderson
- Laneville High School, Laneville
- Leverett's Chapel High School, Laird Hill
- Mount Enterprise High School, Mount Enterprise
- Overton High School, Overton
- Tatum High School, Tatum
- West Rusk High School, New London

== Sabine County ==
- Hemphill High School, Hemphill
- West Sabine High School, Pineland

== San Augustine County ==
- Broaddus High School, Broaddus
- San Augustine High School, San Augustine

== San Jacinto County ==
- Coldspring-Oakhurst High School, Coldspring
- Shepherd High School, Shepherd

== San Patricio County ==
- Aransas Pass High School, Aransas Pass
- Gregory-Portland High School, Portland
- Ingleside High School, Ingleside
- Mathis High School, Mathis
- Odem High School, Odem
- Sinton High School, Sinton
- Taft High School, Taft

== San Saba County ==
- Cherokee High School, Cherokee
- Richland Springs High School, Richland Springs
- San Saba High School, San Saba

== Schleicher County ==
- Eldorado High School, Eldorado

== Scurry County ==
- Hermleigh High School, Hermleigh
- Ira High School, Ira
- Snyder High School, Snyder

== Shackelford County ==
- Albany Junior-Senior High School, Albany
- Moran High School, Moran

== Shelby County ==
- Center High School, Center
- Joaquin High School, Joaquin
- Shelbyville High School, Shelbyville
- Tenaha High School, Tenaha
- Timpson High School, Timpson

== Sherman County ==
- Stratford High School, Stratford

== Smith County ==
- Arp High School, Arp
- Lindale High School, Lindale
- Troup High School, Troup
- Whitehouse High School, Whitehouse
- Winona High School, Winona

=== Bullard ===
- Brook Hill School
- Bullard High School

=== Tyler ===
- All Saints Episcopal School
- Bishop Gorman High School
- Chapel Hill High School
- Christian Heritage School
- Founders Classical Academy - Tyler
- Grace Community School
- Harvest Time Christian Academy
- King's Academy Christian School
- Premier Charter School - Tyler
- Trinity Charter Schools - Tyler
- Tyler High School
- Tyler Legacy High School

== Somervell County ==
- Glen Rose High School, Glen Rose
- Brazos River Charter School, Nemo

== Starr County ==
- Roma High School, Roma
- San Isidro High School, San Isidro

=== Rio Grande City ===
- Grulla High School
- IDEA Schools - Rio Grande City
- Prep for Early College High School
- Rio Grande City High School

== Stephens County ==
- Breckenridge High School, Breckenridge

== Sterling County ==
- Sterling City High School, Sterling City

== Stonewall County ==
- Aspermont High School, Aspermont

== Sutton County ==
- Sonora High School, Sonora

== Swisher County ==
- Happy High School, Happy
- Kress High School, Kress
- Tulia High School, Tulia

== Tarrant County ==
- Azle High School, Azle
- Bell High School, Hurst
- Crowley High School, Crowley
- Everman High School, Everman
- Haltom High School, Haltom City
- Lake Worth High School, Lake Worth
- Pantego Christian Academy, Pantego
- Saginaw High School (Texas), Saginaw
- Trinity Prep, Watauga
- Western Hills High School, Benbrook

=== Arlington ===
==== Public Schools ====
- Arlington High School
- Bowie High School
- Lamar High School
- Mansfield Timberview High School
- Martin High School
- Sam Houston High School
- Seguin High School

==== Charter/Private Schools ====
- Burton Adventist Academy
- Gateway School
- Grace Preparatory Academy
- Newman International Academy (Arlington, Grace)
- The Oakridge School
- Premier Charter School - Arlington
- St. Paul's Preparatory Academy
- Uplift Schools - Summit International Prep
- Texas Leadership Charter Academy - Arlington

=== Colleyville ===
- Colleyville Heritage High School
- Covenant Christian Academy

=== Euless ===
- Harmony Science Academy - Euless
- Treetops School International
- Trinity High School

=== Fort Worth ===
==== Public Schools ====
- Arlington Heights High School
- Boswell High School
- Brewer High School
- Carter-Riverside High School
- Castleberry High School
- Chisholm Trail High School
- Diamond Hill-Jarvis High School
- Dunbar High School
- Eastern Hills High School
- Fossil Ridge High School
- Keller Central High School
- Marine Creek Collegiate School
- North Crowley High School
- North Side High School
- Paschal High School
- Polytechnic High School
- South Hills High School
- Southwest High School
- TCC South Collegiate High School
- Terrell STEM/VPA Academy
- Timber Creek High School
- Trimble Technical High School
- World Languages Institute
- Wyatt High School
- Young Men's Leadership Academy
- Young Women's Leadership Academy

==== Charter/Private Schools ====
- All Saints' Episcopal School
- Bethesda Christian School
- Cassata Catholic High School
- Christian Life Preparatory School
- Covenant Classical School
- Cristo Rey Fort Worth College Prep
- Fort Worth Country Day School
- Harmony School of Innovation - Fort Worth
- International Leadership of Texas - Keller-Saginaw
- Lake Country Christian School
- Mercy Culture Preparatory School
- Nolan Catholic High School
- Premier Charter School (Fort Worth, Jacksboro, Southside)
- Southwest Christian School
- Temple Christian School
- Texans Can Academy (Lancaster, West Creek)
- Trinity Charter Schools (East Seminary, Fort Worth)
- Trinity Valley School
- Uplift Schools - Mighty Prep

=== Grapevine ===
- Grapevine Faith Christian School
- Grapevine High School

=== Keller ===
- Harvest Christian Academy
- Keller High School

=== Kennedale ===
- Fellowship Academy
- Kennedale High School

=== Mansfield ===
- Mansfield High School
- Mansfield Lake Ridge High School
- Mansfield Legacy High School
- Mansfield Summit High School

=== North Richland Hills ===
- Birdville High School
- E. A. Young Academy
- Fort Worth Christian School
- Richland High School
- Winfree Academy North Richland Hills

=== Southlake ===
- Carroll High School
- The Clariden School

== Taylor County ==
- Merkel High School, Merkel
- Trent High School, Trent
- Jim Ned High School, Tuscola

=== Abilene ===
- Abilene Christian School
- Abilene High School
- Academy of Technology, Engineering, Mathematics, and Science
- Cooper High School
- Holland Medical High School
- Premier Charter School - Abilene
- Wylie High School

== Terrell County ==
- Sanderson High School, Sanderson

== Terry County ==
- Brownfield High School, Brownfield
- Meadow High School, Meadow
- Wellman-Union High School, Wellman

== Throckmorton County ==
- Throckmorton High School, Throckmorton
- Woodson High School, Woodson

== Titus County ==
=== Mount Pleasant ===
- Chapel Hill High School
- Mount Pleasant High School

== Tom Green County ==
- Christoval High School, Christoval
- Grape Creek High School, Grape Creek
- Veribest High School, Veribest
- Wall High School, Wall
- Water Valley High School, Water Valley

=== San Angelo ===
- Central High School
- Lake View High School
- Premier Charter School (Ingram, San Angelo, Windcrest)
- Texas Leadership Charter Academy - San Angelo

== Travis County ==
- Del Valle High School, Del Valle
- Lago Vista High School, Lago Vista

=== Austin ===
==== Public Schools ====
- Akins High School
- Anderson High School
- Austin High School
- Bowie High School
- Crockett High School
- Eastside Memorial High School
- Garza High School
- Johnson High School/Liberal Arts/Science Academy
- Lake Travis High School
- Lanier High School
- McCallum High School
- McNeil High School
- Reagan High School
- Travis High School
- Vandegrift High School
- Westlake High School
- Westwood High School

==== Charter Schools ====
- Austin Achieve High School
- Chaparral Star Academy
- Harmony School of Excellence - Austin
- IDEA Schools (Bluff Springs, Montopolis, Parmer Park, Rundberg)
- Jubilee Charter Academy - Austin
- KIPP Austin Schools (Brave, Collegiate)
- NYOS Charter School
- Premier Charter School (South, Wells)
- Texans Can Academy - Austin
- Valor Academy (North, South)
- Wayside Sci-Tech High School

==== Private Schools ====
- Austin Peace Academy
- Austin Waldorf School
- Brentwood Christian School
- The Griffin School
- Headwaters School
- Hill Country Christian School
- Huntington-Surrey High School
- Hyde Park Baptist High School
- Kirby Hall School
- Regents School of Austin
- St. Andrew's Episcopal School
- St. Dominic Savio Catholic High School
- St. Michael's Academy
- St. Stephen's Episcopal School
- San Juan Diego Catholic High School
- Veritas Academy

=== Cedar Park ===
- Cedar Park High School
- Summit Christian Academy

=== Manor ===
- Manor Early College High School
- Manor Excel Academy
- Manor High School
- Manor New Technology High School

=== Pflugerville ===
- Concordia Academy
- Connally High School
- Harmony Science Academy - Pflugerville
- Hendrickson High School
- PACE Alternative High School
- Pflugerville High School
- Weiss High School
- Premier Charter School - Pflugerville

== Trinity County ==
- Apple Springs High School, Apple Springs
- Centerville High School, Groveton
- Groveton Junior/Senior High School, Groveton
- Trinity High School, Trinity

== Tyler County ==
- Chester High School, Chester
- Colmesneil High School, Colmesneil
- Spurger High School, Spurger
- Warren High School, Warren
- Woodville High School, Woodville

== Upshur County ==
- Gilmer High School, Gilmer
- Gladewater High School, Gladewater
- New Diana High School, Diana
- Ore City High School, Ore City
- Union Grove High School, Union Grove
- Union Hill High School, Union Hill

=== Big Sandy ===
- Big Sandy High School
- Harmony High School

== Upton County ==
- McCamey High School, McCamey
- Rankin High School, Rankin

== Uvalde County ==
- Knippa High School, Knippa
- Sabinal High School, Sabinal
- Utopia High School, Utopia
- Uvalde High School, Uvalde

== Val Verde County ==
- Comstock High School, Comstock

=== Del Rio ===
- Del Rio High School
- Premier Charter School - Del Rio

== Van Zandt County ==
- Canton High School, Canton
- Edgewood High School, Edgewood
- Fruitvale High School, Fruitvale
- Grand Saline High School, Grand Saline
- Martin's Mill High School, Martins Mill
- Van High School, Van
- Wills Point High School, Wills Point

== Victoria County ==
- Bloomington High School, Bloomington

=== Victoria ===
- Faith Academy
- Memorial High School
- St. Joseph High School
- Victoria East High School
- Victoria West High School

== Walker County ==
=== Huntsville ===
- Alpha Omega Academy
- Huntsville High School (Texas)
- Premier Charter School - Huntsville

=== New Waverly ===
- New Waverly High School
- Raven School

== Waller County ==
- Hempstead High School, Hempstead
- Royal High School, Brookshire
- Waller High School, Waller

== Ward County ==
- Grandfalls-Royalty High School, Grandfalls
- Monahans High School, Monahans

== Washington County ==
- Burton High School, Burton

=== Brenham ===
- Brenham High School
- Citadel Christian School
- Trinity Charter Schools - Brenham

== Webb County ==
- Bruni High School, Bruni

=== Laredo ===
- Alexander High School
- Cigarroa High School
- Gateway Academy
- Harmony School of Excellence - Laredo
- Johnson High School
- Martin High School
- Nixon High School
- Premier Charter School - Laredo
- Triumph School - Laredo
- United High School
- United South High School

== Wharton County ==
- Boling High School, Boling
- East Bernard High School, East Bernard
- El Campo High School, El Campo
- Louise High School, Louise
- Wharton High School, Wharton

== Wheeler County ==
- Fort Elliott High School, Briscoe
- Kelton High School, Kelton
- Shamrock High School, Shamrock
- Wheeler High School, Wheeler

== Wichita County ==
- Burkburnett High School, Burkburnett
- Electra High School, Electra
- Iowa Park High School, Iowa Park

=== Wichita Falls ===
- Christ Academy
- City View Junior/Senior High School
- Hirschi High School
- Notre Dame High School
- Premier Charter School - Wichita Falls
- Rider High School
- Wichita Christian School
- Wichita Falls High School

== Wilbarger County ==
- Harrold High School, Harrold
- Northside High School, Fargo
- Vernon High School, Vernon

== Willacy County ==
- Lyford High School, Lyford
- Raymondville High School, Raymondville
- San Perlita High School, San Perlita

== Williamson County ==
- Florence High School, Florence
- Granger High School, Granger
- Hutto High School, Hutto
- Jarrell High School, Jarrell
- Liberty Hill High School, Liberty Hill
- Thrall High School, Thrall

=== Cedar Park ===
- Cedar Park High School
- Vista Ridge High School

=== Georgetown ===
- Chip Richarte High School
- East View High School
- Georgetown High School

=== Leander ===
- Founders Classical Academy - Leander
- Glenn High School
- Leander High School
- Rouse High School

=== Round Rock ===
- Cedar Ridge High School
- Round Rock Christian Academy
- Round Rock High School
- Stony Point High School

=== Taylor ===
- St. Mary's Catholic School
- Taylor High School

== Wilson County ==
- Floresville High School, Floresville
- La Vernia High School, La Vernia
- Poth High School, Poth
- Stockdale High School, Stockdale

== Winkler County ==
- Kermit High School, Kermit
- Wink High School, Wink

== Wise County ==
- Alvord High School, Alvord
- Boyd High School, Boyd
- Chico High School, Chico
- Decatur High School, Decatur
- Paradise High School, Paradise
- Slidell High School, Slidell

=== Bridgeport ===
- Bridgeport High School
- Wise County Special Education Cooperative

== Wood County ==
- Alba-Golden High School, Alba
- Hawkins High School, Hawkins
- Mineola High School, Mineola
- Quitman High School, Quitman
- Winnsboro High School, Winnsboro
- Yantis High School, Yantis

== Yoakum County ==
- Denver City High School, Denver City
- Plains High School, Plains

== Young County ==
- Graham High School, Graham
- Newcastle High School, Newcastle
- Olney High School, Olney

== Zapata County ==
- Zapata High School, Zapata

== Zavala County ==
- Crystal City High School, Crystal City
- La Pryor High School, La Pryor

== See also ==
- List of school districts in Texas
- List of schools in Harris County, Texas
