= St. Hedwig, Texas =

- Town
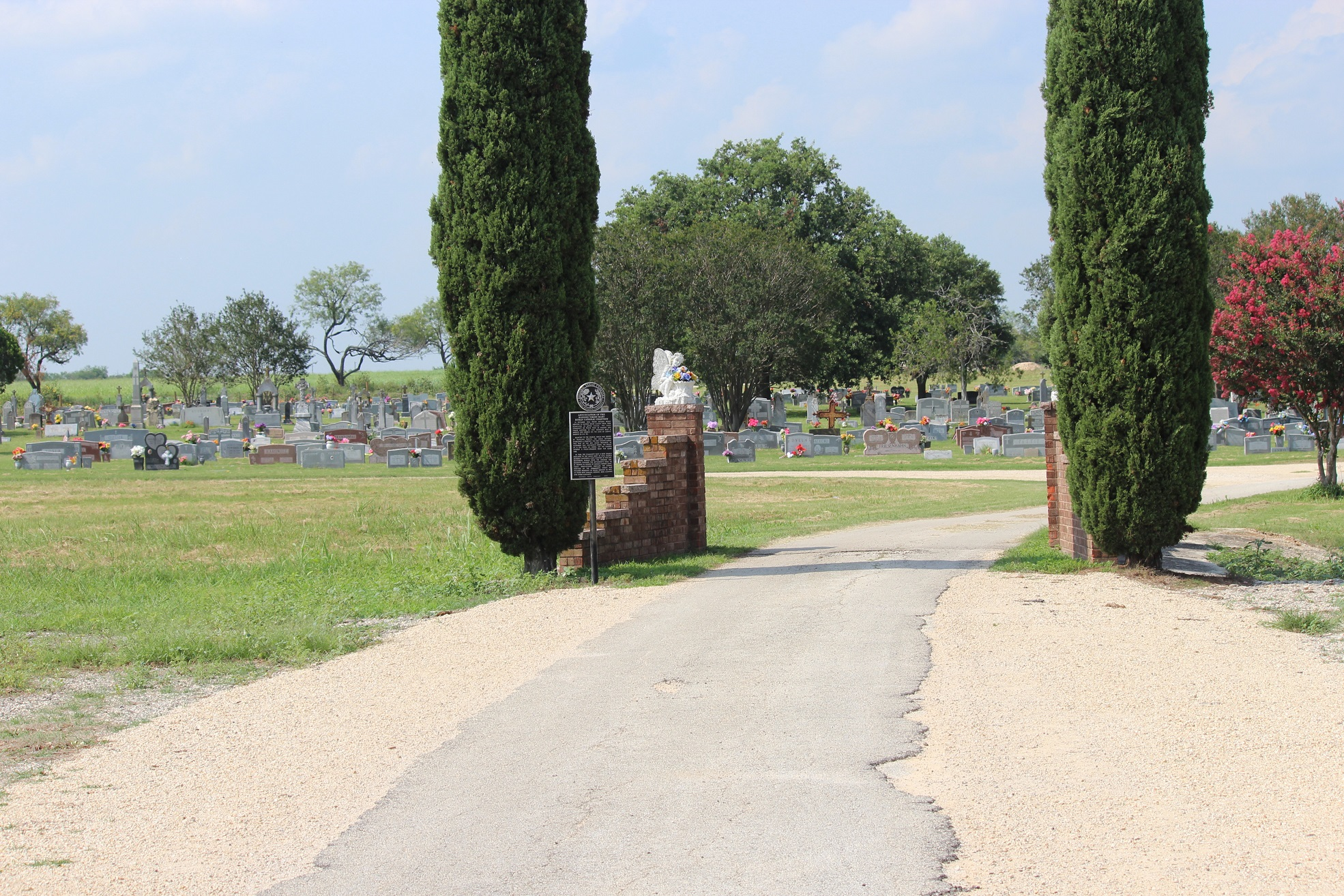
- Annunciation of the Blessed Virgin Mary Roman Catholic Cemetery

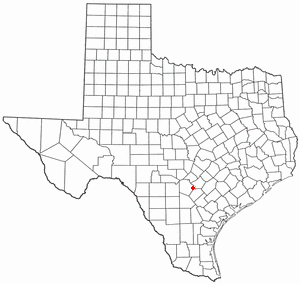
- Location of St. Hedwig, Texas

- Coordinates: 29°25′28″N 98°12′52″W
- Country: United States
- State: Texas
- County: Bexar

Area
  - Total: 29.90 sq mi (77.45 km^{2})
  - Land: 29.63 sq mi (76.75 km^{2})
  - Water: 0.27 sq mi (0.70 km^{2})
- Elevation: 577 ft (176 m)

Population (2020)
  - Total: 2,227
  - Density: 84.0/sq mi (32.42/km^{2})
- Time zone: UTC-6 (Central (CST))
  - Summer (DST): UTC-5 (CDT)
- ZIP Code: 78152
- Area codes: 210, 726
- FIPS code: 48-64172
- GNIS feature ID: 1345901
- ANSI Code: 2412593
- Website: http://sainthedwigcity.com/

St. Hedwig is a rural town in Bexar County, Texas, United States founded by German and Polish emigrants in 1852. The population was 2,227 at the 2020 census. It is part of the San Antonio Metropolitan Statistical Area. It was founded by German and Polish emigrants and named after Saint Hedwig, a prominent Polish saint in the Catholic Church.

== History ==
The town was founded by John Demmer in 1852 when he moved to the area from his native Silesia (modern day Poland). In 1856, four more Silesians immigrated to the area and built the site's first Catholic Church, Annunciation (under the Roman Catholic Archdiocese of San Antonio). In 1860, a post office named Cottage Hill was opened, but was later renamed St. Hedwig after the patron saint of Silesia. By 1868, the community had built a stone church, and in 1897, the town boasted 200 families, mainly from Poland and Germany. To this day, most of the area's residents can trace their ancestry back to Poland and Germany.

== Geography ==
According to the United States Census Bureau, St. Hedwig has a total area of 30.1 square miles (78 km^{2}), all land.

== Demographics ==
Historical population
Census	Pop.	Note	%±
1880	64		—
1990	1,443		—
2000	1,875		29.9%
2010	2,094		11.7%
2020	2,227		6.4%
U.S. Decennial Census

St. Hedwig racial composition as of 2020 (NH = Non-Hispanic) (Note: Note: the US Census treats Hispanic/Latino as an ethnic category. This table excludes Latinos from the racial categories and assigns them to a separate category. Hispanics/Latinos can be of any race.)
Race	Number	Percentage
White (NH)	1,529	68.66%
Black or African American (NH)	42	1.89%
Native American or Alaska Native (NH)	2	0.09%
Asian (NH)	8	0.36%
Pacific Islander (NH)	1	0.04%
Mixed/Multi-Racial (NH)	81	3.64%
Hispanic or Latino	564	25.33%
Total	2,227	

As of the 2020 United States census, there were 2,227 people, 790 households, and 573 families residing in the town.

=== 2000 census ===
Largest ancestries (2000)	Percent
German (Germany)	34.2%
Polish (Poland)	28.9%
Irish (Republic of Ireland)	11.5%
English (England)	4.7%
American (United States)	4.6%
Czech (Czech Republic)	2.3%

As of the census of 2000, there were 1,875 people, 653 households, and 543 families residing in the town. The population density was 62.3 inhabitants per square mile (24.1/km^{2}). There were 687 housing units at an average density of 22.8 per square mile (8.8/km^{2}). The racial makeup of the town was 91.95% White, 2.88% African American, 0.32% Native American, 0.21% Asian, 0.05% Pacific Islander, 2.67% from other races, and 1.92% from two or more races. Hispanic or Latino of any race were 10.35% of the population.

There were 653 households, out of which 40.0% had children under the age of 18 living with them, 73.0% were married couples living together, 6.3% had a female householder with no husband present, and 16.7% were non-families. 13.6% of all households were made up of individuals, and 7.5% had someone living alone who was 65 years of age or older. The average household size was 2.87 and the average family size was 3.17.

In the town, the population was spread out, with 27.2% under the age of 18, 6.1% from 18 to 24, 30.2% from 25 to 44, 25.9% from 45 to 64, and 10.5% who were 65 years of age or older. The median age was 38 years. For every 100 females, there were 105.8 males. For every 100 females age 18 and over, there were 101.6 males.

The median income for a household in the town was $55,481, and the median income for a family was $58,603. Males had a median income of $34,615 versus $27,700 for females. The per capita income for the town was $19,477. About 4.1% of families and 6.7% of the population were below the poverty line, including 9.3% of those under age 18 and 11.4% of those age 65 or over.

== Education ==
Most of St. Hedwig is in East Central Independent School District. A portion is in Schertz-Cibolo-Universal City Independent School District.

East Central ISD operates Tradition Elementary in St. Hedwig. East Central High School is that district's comprehensive high school.
