= St. Paul's Academy =

St. Paul('s) Academy may refer to:

- St. Paul's R.C. Academy, a high school in Dundee, Scotland
- St. Paul's Preparatory Academy, a defunct school in Phoenix, Arizona, United States
- St. Paul Academy and Summit School, an independent school in St. Paul, Minnesota, United States
- St. Paul Christian Academy, an independent school in Nashville, Tennessee, United States
- St Paul's Academy, Abbey Wood, a secondary school in Abbey Wood, London, England

== See also ==
- Saint Paul's College (Virginia)
