= China Grove, Texas =

- Town
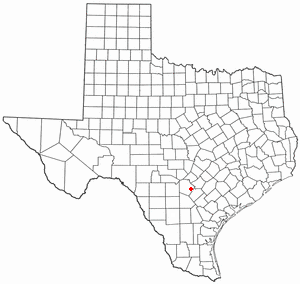
- Location of China Grove, Texas

- Coordinates: 29°23′35″N 98°20′44″W
- Country: United States
- State: Texas
- County: Bexar

Area
  - Total: 4.34 sq mi (11.24 km^{2})
  - Land: 4.31 sq mi (11.17 km^{2})
  - Water: 0.027 sq mi (0.07 km^{2})
- Elevation: 653 ft (199 m)

Population (2020)
  - Total: 1,141
  - Density: 306.3/sq mi (118.26/km^{2})
- Time zone: UTC-6 (Central (CST))
  - Summer (DST): UTC-5 (CDT)
- ZIP code: 78263
- Area codes: 210, 726 (planned)
- FIPS code: 48-14716
- GNIS feature ID: 1332767
- ANSI Code: 2413198
- Website: www.cityofchinagrovetx.gov

China Grove is a town in Bexar County, Texas, United States, located on the far east side of San Antonio. The population was 1,141 at the 2020 census. It is part of the San Antonio Metropolitan Statistical Area.

== Geography ==
China Grove is located approximately 12 miles (19 km) east of downtown San Antonio.

According to the United States Census Bureau, the town has a total area of 4.3 square miles (11 km^{2}), all land.

== Demographics ==
Historical population
| Census | Pop. | Note | %± |
|---|---|---|---|
| 1970 | 329 | | — |
| 1980 | 434 | | 31.9% |
| 1990 | 872 | | 100.9% |
| 2000 | 1,247 | | 43.0% |
| 2010 | 1,179 | | −5.5% |
| 2020 | 1,141 | | −3.2% |
U.S. Decennial Census

China Grove racial composition as of 2020 (NH = Non-Hispanic) (Note: Note: the US Census treats Hispanic/Latino as an ethnic category. This table excludes Latinos from the racial categories and assigns them to a separate category. Hispanics/Latinos can be of any race.)
| Race | Number | Percentage |
|---|---|---|
| White or European American (NH) | 549 | 48.12% |
| Black or African American (NH) | 74 | 6.49% |
| Native American or Alaska Native (NH) | 6 | 0.53% |
| Asian (NH) | 6 | 0.53% |
| Pacific Islander (NH) | 1 | 0.09% |
| Mixed/Multi-Racial (NH) | 39 | 3.42% |
| Hispanic or Latino | 466 | 40.84% |
| Total | 1,141 | |

As of the 2020 United States census, there were 1,141 people, 363 households, and 306 families residing in the town.

At the 2000 census 1,247 people, 404 households, and 355 families were residing in the town. The population density was 303.0 inhabitants per square mile (117.0/km^{2}). There were 417 housing units at an average density of 101.3 per square mile (39.1/km^{2}). The racial makeup of the town was 86.93% White, 5.93% African American, 0.24% Native American, 0.08% Asian, 4.81% from other races, and 2.00% from two or more races. Hispanic or Latino of any race were 22.53%.

Of the 404 households 43.1% had children under the age of 18 living with them, 80.0% were married couples living together, 6.9% had a female householder with no husband present, and 11.9% were non-families. 9.9% of households were one person and 5.0% were one person aged 65 or older. The average household size was 3.09 and the average family size was 3.30.

The age distribution was 28.1% under the age of 18, 6.7% from 18 to 24, 25.9% from 25 to 44, 27.2% from 45 to 64, and 12.1% 65 or older. The median age was 40 years. For every 100 females, there were 98.9 males. For every 100 females age 18 and over, there were 96.5 males.

The median household income was $67,333 and the median family income was $73,125. Males had a median income of $43,482 versus $30,391 for females. The per capita income for the town was $22,745. About 2.4% of families and 3.4% of the population were below the poverty line, including 2.6% of those under age 18 and 2.2% of those age 65 or over.

== Cultural references ==
The community became famous in 1973 when the Doobie Brothers' "China Grove" became a hit song. It was written and sung by The Doobies' Tom Johnston, who wrote "China Grove"' after passing through the town on tour, on his way to a concert in San Antonio, Texas. Johnston later said he did not recall noticing the town's name at the time, but later thought it must have been a subconscious memory that led him to use "China Grove" as a song title, and in the song's lyrics, about the small town.

It was probably named after a grove of chinaberry trees in town.

== Climate ==
The climate in this area is characterized by hot, humid summers and generally mild to cool winters. According to the Köppen Climate Classification system, China Grove has a humid subtropical climate, abbreviated "Cfa" on climate maps.

== Education ==
It is in the East Central Independent School District. The public high school is East Central High School.
