= Calvary Baptist Academy =

Calvary Baptist Academy may refer to:

- Calvary Baptist Academy (midland, Michigan)
- Calvary Baptist Academy (New Braunfels, Texas)
- Calvary Baptist Academy (Shreveport, Louisiana)
