= Michael Toudouze =

American football player (born 1983)

No. 75, 73, 60
- Position: Offensive tackle

Personal information
- Born: April 27, 1983 (age 43); San Antonio, Texas, U.S.
- Listed height: 6 ft 6 in (1.98 m)
- Listed weight: 303 lb (137 kg)

Career information
- High school: East Central (San Antonio)
- College: TCU
- NFL draft: 2006: 5th round, 162nd overall pick

Career history
- Indianapolis Colts (2006–2008); New York Sentinels (2009); Indianapolis Colts (2009); Tennessee Titans (2010)*; Florida Tuskers (2010)*; Indianapolis Colts (2010–2011); San Diego Chargers (2012)*
- * Offseason or practice squad member only

Awards and highlights
- Super Bowl champion (XLI); First-team All-MW (2005)

Career NFL statistics
- Games played: 9
- Games started: 1
- Stats at Pro Football Reference

John Michael Toudouze (born April 27, 1983) is an American former professional football player who was an offensive tackle in the National Football League (NFL). He played college football for the TCU Horned Frogs and was selected by the Indianapolis Colts in the fifth round of the 2006 NFL draft.

Toudouze was also a member of the New York Sentinels, Tennessee Titans, Florida Tuskers and San Diego Chargers.

== Early life ==
Toudouze grew up in San Antonio, and was an all-district football player at East Central High School.

== College career ==
At Texas Christian University (TCU), he spent most of his early years as the backup to former Miami Dolphins' offensive tackle Anthony Alabi. He became the starter as a senior in 2005, and was named First-team All-MWC as the Horned Frogs went 10–2 to win the conference championship.

== Professional career ==
Pre-draft measurables
Height	Weight	Arm length	Hand span	40-yard dash	10-yard split	20-yard split	20-yard shuttle	Three-cone drill	Vertical jump	Broad jump	Bench press
6 ft 5 3/4 in (1.97 m)	303 lb (137 kg)	34 1/4 in (0.87 m)	10 3/8 in (0.26 m)	5.12 s	1.78 s	2.99 s	4.70 s	7.45 s	26.5 in (0.67 m)	8 ft 4 in (2.54 m)	23 reps
All values from NFL Combine

In his rookie year with the NFL, Toudouze was a member of the Indianapolis Colts' Super Bowl XLI championship team.

On September 29, 2007, the Colts released him at the end of training camp. He was re-signed on November 10, and made his NFL debut a day later on Sunday Night Football against the San Diego Chargers. On December 9, 2009, Toudouze was re-signed by the Colts.

On August 10, 2010, he signed with the Tennessee Titans.

The San Diego Chargers signed him on August 8, 2012, but was terminated on August 27, 2012.
