= Kirby Hall School =

Coordinates: 30°17′40″N 97°44′25″W

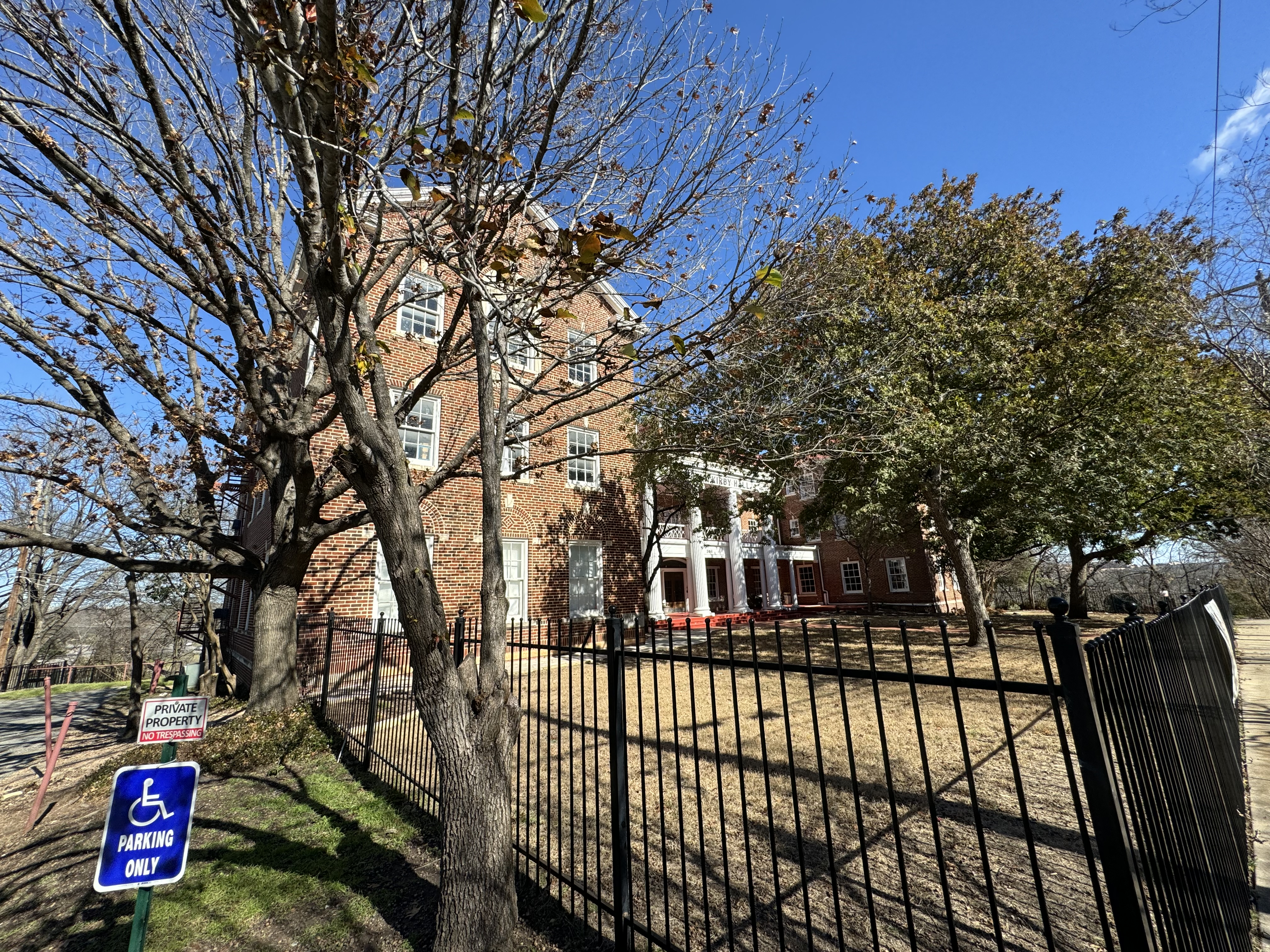
- 306 W 29th St, Austin, TX 78705

Information
- Established: 1976
- Founder: Beverly Rase
- Grades: Pre-K4 - 8th
- Gender: Co-Ed
- Average class size: 15
- Colors: Red and White
- Mascot: Penguin
- Accreditation: Cognia
- Website: http://www.kirbyhallschool.org/

Kirby Hall School is a private Pre-K4 through 8th grade non-faith based private school located in Austin, Texas on the historic grounds of Helen M. Kirby Hall. Dr. and Mrs. Howard F. Rase founded Kirby Hall School in 1976 as a school for academically curious and creative students.

== History ==
Kirby Hall was constructed nearby the University of Texas at Austin campus by the Methodist Board of Missions in 1924 as an all-women dormitory. The dormitory remained open until the fall of 1971 and sat empty until it received renovations and updates for the opening of Kirby Hall School in 1976. Kirby Hall School gained recognition by Austin's Historic Landmark Committee as a historic building shortly before opening in 1976.

== Notable alumni ==
- Will Creedle
- Christopher Pettiet
- Andy Roddick

== Notable former instructors ==
- H.W. Brands
