= Bexar County Learning Center =

Location
- 3621 Farm Road; San Antonio, Texas 78223; United States
- 29.311143°N 98.426818°W

Information
- Other name: BCLC
- Type: Public high school
- Locale: Rural
- School district: East Central Independent School District
- NCES District ID: 4817850
- Educational authority: Texas Education Agency
- Superintendent: Keeley Boyer
- NCES School ID: 481785007517
- Principal: Dustin Breithaupt
- Faculty: 12
- Teaching staff: 3.00 (FTE)
- Grades: 7-12
- Enrollment: 41 (2024-2025)
  - Grade 7: 1
  - Grade 8: 4
  - Grade 9: 27
  - Grade 10: 8
  - Grade 11: 0
  - Grade 12: 1
- Student to teacher ratio: 13.67
- Website: bclcrtc.ecisd.net

Bexar County Learning Center is a secondary alternative school located in San Antonio, Texas, in the East Central Independent School District. The campus serves youth at the Cyndi Zachary taylor Krier Center from across Bexar County. In 2019, the campus was recognized by Georgetown University for their Capstone Project to improve educational outcomes for students at the Krier Center. Former principal Dr. Dustin Breithaupt left the campus to join Lytle ISD as assistant superintendent. For the 2024-2025 school year, the school remained unrated by the Texas Education Agency.
