= Sanchez High School =

Sanchez High School may refer to:

- Simon Sanchez High School - Yigo, Guam
- George I. Sanchez High School (charter) - Houston, Texas
