= Gold-Burg High School =

Public school in Texas, United States

Location
- 468 Prater Road; Bowie, Texas 76230-9801; United States; 33.673335°N 97.903319°W

Information
- School type: Public high school
- School district: Gold-Burg Independent School District
- Principal: Steve Cope
- Staff: 15.54 (on an FTE basis)
- Grades: PK-12
- Enrollment: 155 (2023–24)
- Student to teacher ratio: 9.97
- Colors: Green & White
- Athletics conference: UIL Class A
- Mascot: Bear
- Website: Gold-Burg High School website

Gold-Burg High School or Gold-Burg Secondary School is a 1A public high school located near unincorporated Stoneburg, Texas (USA) but has a Bowie mailing address. It is part of the Gold-Burg Independent School District located in western Montague County and is a consolidation of Ringgold and Stoneburg. In 2011, the school was rated "Academically Acceptable" by the Texas Education Agency.

== Athletics ==
The Gold-Burg Bears compete in the following sports:

- Basketball
- Cross Country
- 6-Man Football
- Golf
- Tennis
- Track and Field
- Volleyball

=== State Titles ===
- Girls Golf -
  - 1985(1A)

== See also ==
- List of high schools in Texas
