= Gold-Burg Independent School District =

School district in Texas

Location
- 468 Prater Rd. Bowie, Texas ESC Region 9 USA
- Coordinates: 33°40′28″N 97°54′13″W

District information
- Type: Public
- Grades: Pre-K through 12
- Superintendent: Kim Williams
- NCES District ID: 4820970

Students and staff
- Athletic conference: UIL Class A (six man football participant)
- Colors: green and white

Other information
- Mascot: bear
- Website: Gold-Burg ISD

Gold-Burg Independent School District is a public school district in northwestern Montague County, Texas (USA). A small portion of the district extends into northeastern Clay County.

The district's name is a conglomerate of the two unincorporated communities that it serves – "Gold" from Ringgold and "Burg" from Stoneburg.

In 2009, the school district was rated "academically acceptable" by the Texas Education Agency.

== Schools ==
- Gold-Burg Junior High/High School (Grades K–12; Located in Stoneburg)

== Special programs ==
=== Athletics ===
Gold-Burg High School plays six-man football.

== See also ==
- List of school districts in Texas
