= Winfree Academy =

Charter school system in Texas, United States

Coordinates: 32°56′27″N 96°55′2″W

Winfree Academy is a set of charter high schools located in North Texas.

== Locations ==
- Dallas Campus - 2550 Beckleymeade Ave #150,170, Dallas, TX 75237
- Grand Prairie Campus - 2985 S State Highway 360 #160, Grand Prairie, TX 75052
- Irving Campus - 3110 Skyway Cir S, Irving, TX 75038
- Lewisville Campus - 341 Bennett Ln, Lewisville, TX 75057
- North Richland Hills Campus - 6311 Boulevard 26, North Richland Hills, TX 76118
- Richardson Campus - 1661 Gateway Blvd, Richardson, TX 75080
