= Premier High School of Midland =

Coordinates: 31.994791°N 102.102438°W

Information
- Former names: Eagle Charter School (1999-2002); Eagle Academy of Midland (2002-2007)
- School type: Charter school
- Established: 1999; 26 years ago
- Grades: 9-12

Premier High School of Midland is a charter school in Midland, Texas that serves students in ninth grade through twelfth grade. It is part of Responsive Education Solutions of Texas.

Campus Director: Jarret Hostas

== History ==
Premier High School of Midland opened in 1999 as Eagle Charter School with 50 students and three staff and, in 2000, had an enrollment of 150 students. In 2002, Eagle Charter School moved to a larger facility and changed its name to Eagle Academy of Midland. In 2007, it changed its name to Premier High School of Midland and added an Advanced Placement Program for the 2007-2008 school year. In 2007 Premier High School of Midland was noted in the local newspaper The Midland Reporter Telegram for its improvement in its TEKS test scores. In August 2010, the school relocated to a third and still larger facility on Big Spring St. which allowed it to increase its enrollment. For the 2013 school year, the campus moved to a new location on Illinois Drive.
