= Pineywoods Community Academy =

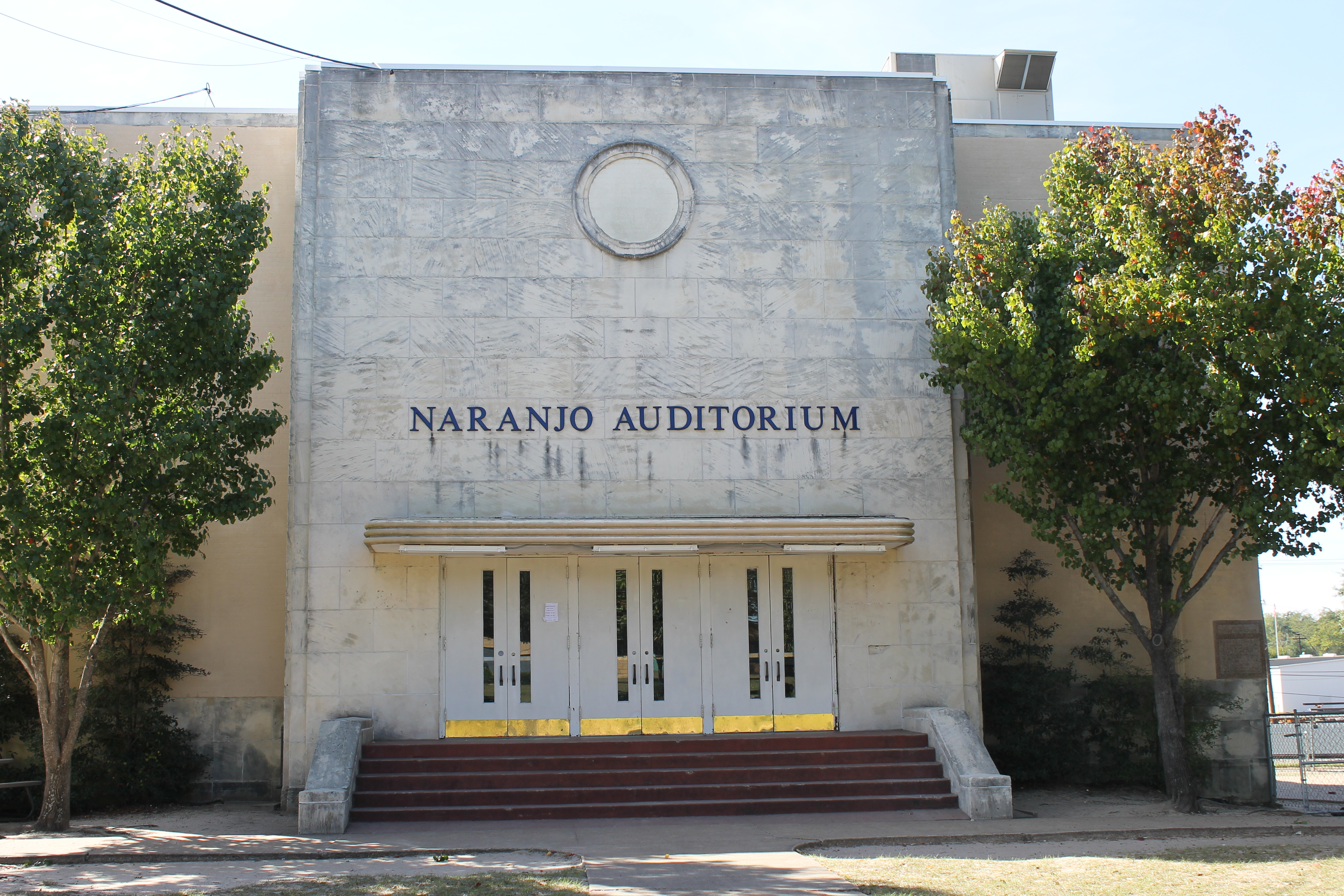
- Naranjo Auditorium located at the school

Location
- 602 South Raguet, Lufkin, Texas, United States; 31.332602°N 94.732178°W

Information
- Other name: PCA
- Type: Charter
- Established: 1998
- Principal: Christopher Draper
- Grades: PreK–12th
- Enrollment: 1,020 (2017–2018)
- Student to teacher ratio: 15.86
- Website: pcacharter.net

Pineywoods Community Academy, also known by the abbreviation PCA, is a PreK–12th grade charter school district located in Lufkin, Texas.

== Curriculum ==
Pineywoods is a Pre-K through twelfth grade charter school. Students in Angelina County, Texas and surrounding areas are open for enrollment. The student teacher ratio is 1 teacher per 15.86 students, and the graduation rate is 100%.

Starting in the 2023–2024 school year students will only attend 4 days per week

Overall, Pineywoods was rated "A" by the Texas Education Agency.

=== Academics ===
High school students are able to take dual-credit courses available through Angelina College. Students are issued their own laptop that can be used at school as well as at home. The ECHS program allows for students to earn up to 60 college hours towards an associate degree. Pineywoods states that their curriculum goes beyond state-mandated TEKS.

=== Athletics ===
Athletic programs offered by the school include:

- Swim and Dive
- High School Boys Basketball
- High School Girls Basketball
- Middle School Boys Basketball
- Middle School Girls Basketball
- Middle School Cross Country
- High School Cross Country
- High School Tennis
- High School Golf

== History ==
Pineywoods Community Academy opened in 1998.

In November 2019, three students, inspired by the Columbine massacre, were arrested for plotting via text message to commit a shooting on the campus.

== Revenue ==
Pineywoods obtains $9,332,000 annually of which $531,000 is from the federal government, $475,000 from local government, and $8,326,000 is from the state government.

== Staff and student body ==
Enrollment by race
Race	Percent of student
White	54.1%
Hispanic and Latino	25.6%
Black or African American	16.4%
Asian	1.4%
Native Americans and Alaska Natives	0%
Native Hawaiians and Other Pacific Islanders	0.1%
Two or more races	2.5%

=== Student body ===
There is a total of 1,020 students enrolled in the school in the 2017–2018 school year. The student body of Pineywoods is 54.1% White, 25.6% Hispanic, 16.4% African American, 1.4% Asian, 0.1% Pacific Islander, and 2.5% two or more races. 50.7% of students are economically disadvantaged and 49.3% are non-educationally disadvantaged. Of the 82 students with disabilities 50 or 61% have an intellectual disability, 18 or 22% have a physical disability, 7 or 8.5% have autism, and 7 or 8.5% have a behavioral disability.

=== Staff ===
Teachers at Pineywoods make $48,574, which is lower than the state of Texas average. The school director is Dr. Ken Vaughn and the principal is Christopher Draper.

==== School board ====
Members of the school board include:

- J. Neal Naranjo, PhD (President)
- Linda Robbins (vice-president)
- Charlie E. Grumbles (Secretary)
- Louise LaVane (Treasurer)
- Joe Douglas, III
- Dr. Josefa Santiago, M.D.
- Sarah Strinden, PhD (Member Emeritus)
