= Berean Christian Academy =

Private Christian School in Katy, Tx

Coordinates: 29.8047°N 95.7937°W

Location
- 2225 Porter Road; Katy, Texas 77493; United States

Information
- Type: Private
- Motto: Excellence Without Compromise
- Religious affiliation: Christian
- Established: 1982
- Locale: Large suburb
- CEEB code: 443733
- NCES School ID: A0109364
- Principal: Mary Strickland
- Teaching staff: 40.9 (on an FTE basis)
- Gender: Coeducational
- Enrollment: 352
  - Pre-kindergarten: 52
  - Kindergarten: 26
  - Grade 1: 20
  - Grade 2: 24
  - Grade 3: 20
  - Grade 4: 13
  - Grade 5: 20
  - Grade 6: 23
  - Grade 7: 25
  - Grade 8: 37
  - Grade 9: 30
  - Grade 10: 11
  - Grade 11: 26
  - Grade 12: 25
- Student to teacher ratio: 7.3
- Hours in school day: 7.5
- Tuition: US$10,200–US$11,900
- Website: www.faithwest.org

Berean Christian Academy, formerly operating as Faith West Academy (pre-merger), is a non-denominational, coeducational, private Christian school with grades preschool-12 with boarding facilities, located in unincorporated Harris County, Texas, near Katy.

== History ==
Faith West began operations in 1982. With 623 students and an annual budget of over $6 million, Faith West was, circa 2001, one of the ten largest private schools in the Greater Houston and Greater Katy areas.

The pre-merger Berean Christian Academy began operations in 2016 and held classes at First Baptist Church in the City of Katy. Faith West was scheduled to merge with Berean following the 2025-2026 school year, with the combined school operating under the name Berean Christian Academy at Faith West.

== Extracurricular activities ==
Circa 2004, Faith West started a theater department.

== Notabe alumni ==
Alumni of Faith West include Ted Cruz, the junior United States senator from Texas, who attended but did not graduate from the school.
