= Phoenix High School (Texas) =

Location
- 902 West 2nd Street; Elgin, Texas 78621; United States; 30.347805°N 97.378515°W

Information
- Type: Public high school
- School district: Elgin Independent School District
- Principal: Cheryl Williams
- Teaching staff: 4.15 (FTE)
- Grades: 9-12
- Enrollment: 45 (2023–2024)
- Student to teacher ratio: 10.84
- Website: Official Website

Phoenix High School is a secondary alternative school located in Elgin, Texas, in the Elgin Independent School District. The school serves all of EISD, including the city of Elgin, as well as portions of Travis County, Lee County and northern Bastrop County. In 2024-2025, the school was given a "C" by the Texas Education Agency.

Phoenix High School is an alternative school and does not have school team sports.
