= Huntington-Surrey High School =

Huntington-Surrey School
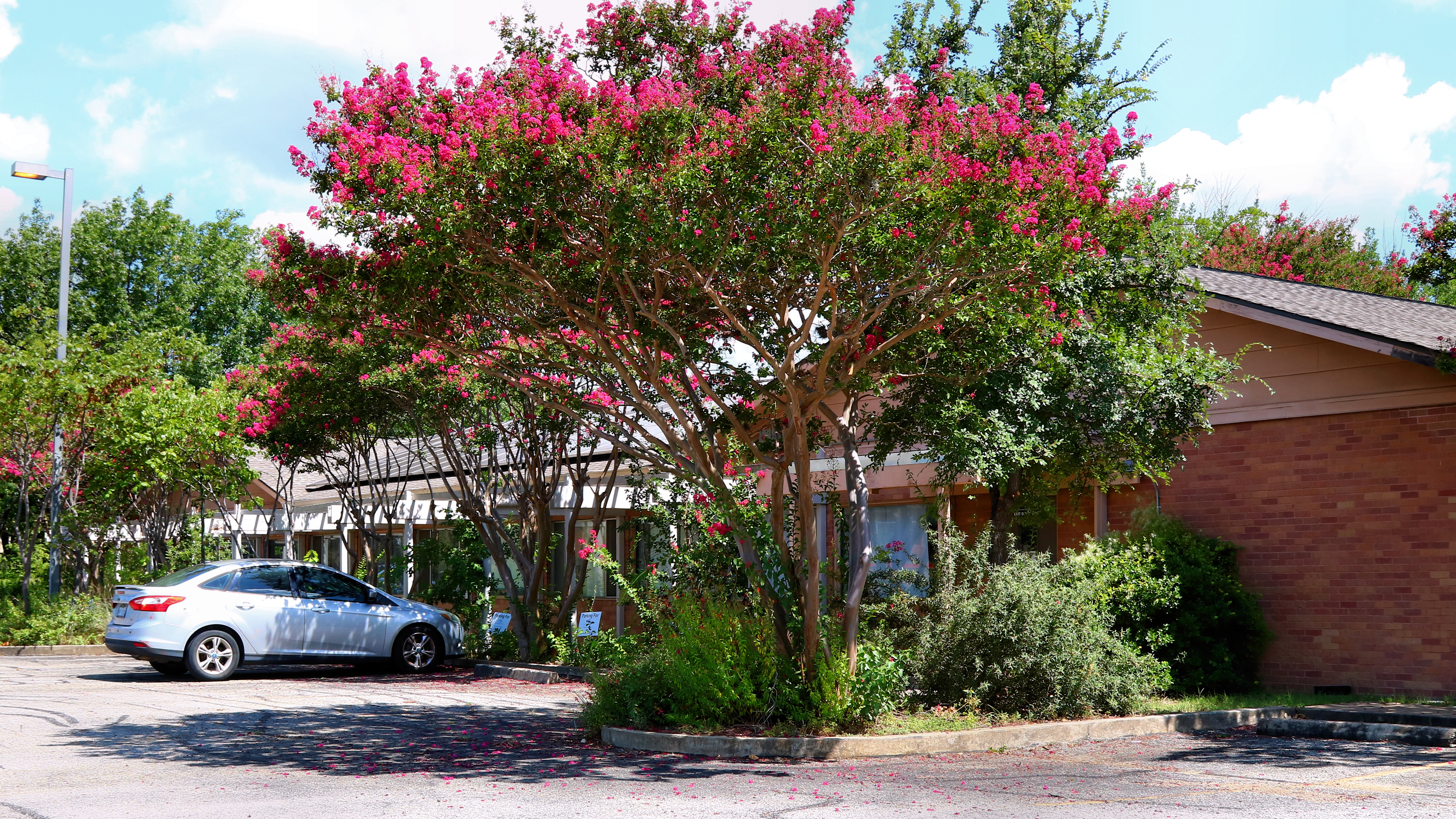
- Huntington-Surrey logo

Location
- 4700 Grover Avenue; Austin, Texas 78731; United States; 30°19′5.97″N 97°44′15.28″W

Information
- Type: Private
- Motto: College Prep - with heart
- Founded: 1973
- Founder: Judy L. Meuth and Timothy A. Noyes
- CEEB code: 440309
- Head of school: Margaret Connor
- Staff: 15
- Grades: 9‒12
- Gender: Coed
- Enrollment: 76
- Average class size: 6
- Student to teacher ratio: 6:1
- Education system: College Preparatory
- Campus size: small
- Campus type: Urban
- Athletics: none
- Mascot: Sapling Oak
- Accreditation: SACS
- Website: http://www.huntingtonsurrey.org/

Huntington-Surrey School is a private non-sectarian college preparatory high school located in Austin, Texas. It was founded in 1973 and is located northwest of the University of Texas campus.

The school offers a curriculum with a focus on composition and literature, with standard science, history, and math classes. Electives, which are offered on Fridays, draw on the various interests and talents of the faculty.

The school is accredited by Cognia (formerly AdvancED/ Southern Association of Colleges and Schools).

== Alumni ==
Notable alumni, in order of the most recent year of attendance (if known), then alphabetically by last name:

- 2003 - Andrew Cadima, composer
- 2003 - Thomas Herndon, economist
