= Wheatley Alternative Education Center =

Location
- 515 East Avenue D Temple, Texas 76501; United States
- Coordinates: 31.090947°N 97.337498°W

Information
- Type: Public high school
- School district: Temple Independent School District
- Principal: Carl Pleasant
- Faculty: 7 (FTE)
- Grades: 2-11
- Enrollment: 74 (2021-2022)
- Website: Official Website

Wheatley Alternative Education Center is a secondary alternative school located in Temple, Texas, in the Temple Independent School District. The school serves all of TISD, including the city of Temple and Bell County. For the 2024-2025 school year, the school remained unrated by the Texas Education Agency.

Wheatley Alternative Education Center is an alternative school and does not have school team sports; however, it does offer physical education, also known as PE.
