= Deweyville Independent School District =

School district in Texas, United States

Address
- 43200 State Highway 87 South Orange, Texas, 77632; United States

District information
- Type: Public
- Grades: PK–12
- Schools: 2
- NCES District ID: 4817010

Students and staff
- Students: 538 (2023–2024)
- Teachers: 54.29 (on an FTE basis) (2023–2024)
- Staff: 54.06 (on an FTE basis) (2023–2024)
- Student–teacher ratio: 9.91 (2023–2024)

Other information
- Website: www.deweyvilleisd.com

Deweyville Independent School District is a public school district in Orange County, Texas based on the community of Deweyville, Texas (USA).

In 2009, the school district was rated "recognized" by the Texas Education Agency.

== Schools ==
- Deweyville Elementary School
- Deweyville High School
