= Will Creedle =

American software accessibility engineer

Will Creedle (born April 16, 1973, in Rochester, Minnesota) is an American Software Accessibility Engineer and advocate for extending the Americans with Disabilities Act of 1990 to all title III websites. He is known for suggesting that conformance is crucial to good design because it brings context to content and accurately re-prioritizes the visual to reflect the content as opposed to the site serving the visuals. He has advocated that the time is now for companies to commit to web compliance, ahead of the DOJ regulations coming, as the DOJ has provided what their compliance standards will be for TITLE III companies: WCAG 2.0 Level AA of the Web Content Accessibility Guidelines.

Creedle spent 7 years working in Manhattan at R/GA, where he conceived the idea of the world's first tweeting e-cigarette as well as worked on several Clio, AD&D and Cannes Cyber Lion winning projects.
