= Harmony Public Schools =

Charter management organization in Texas, US

Coordinates: 29.6825°N 95.5584°W

Harmony Public School
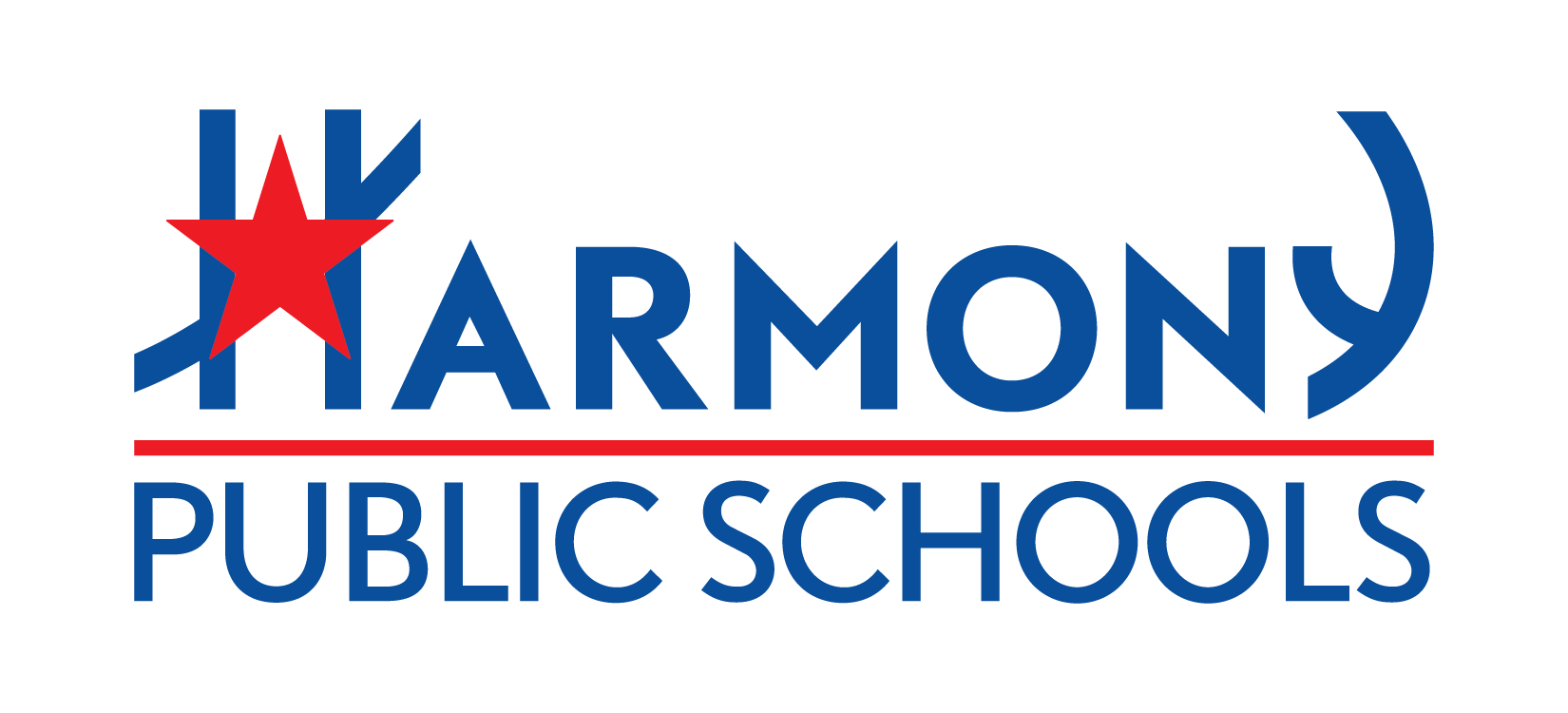

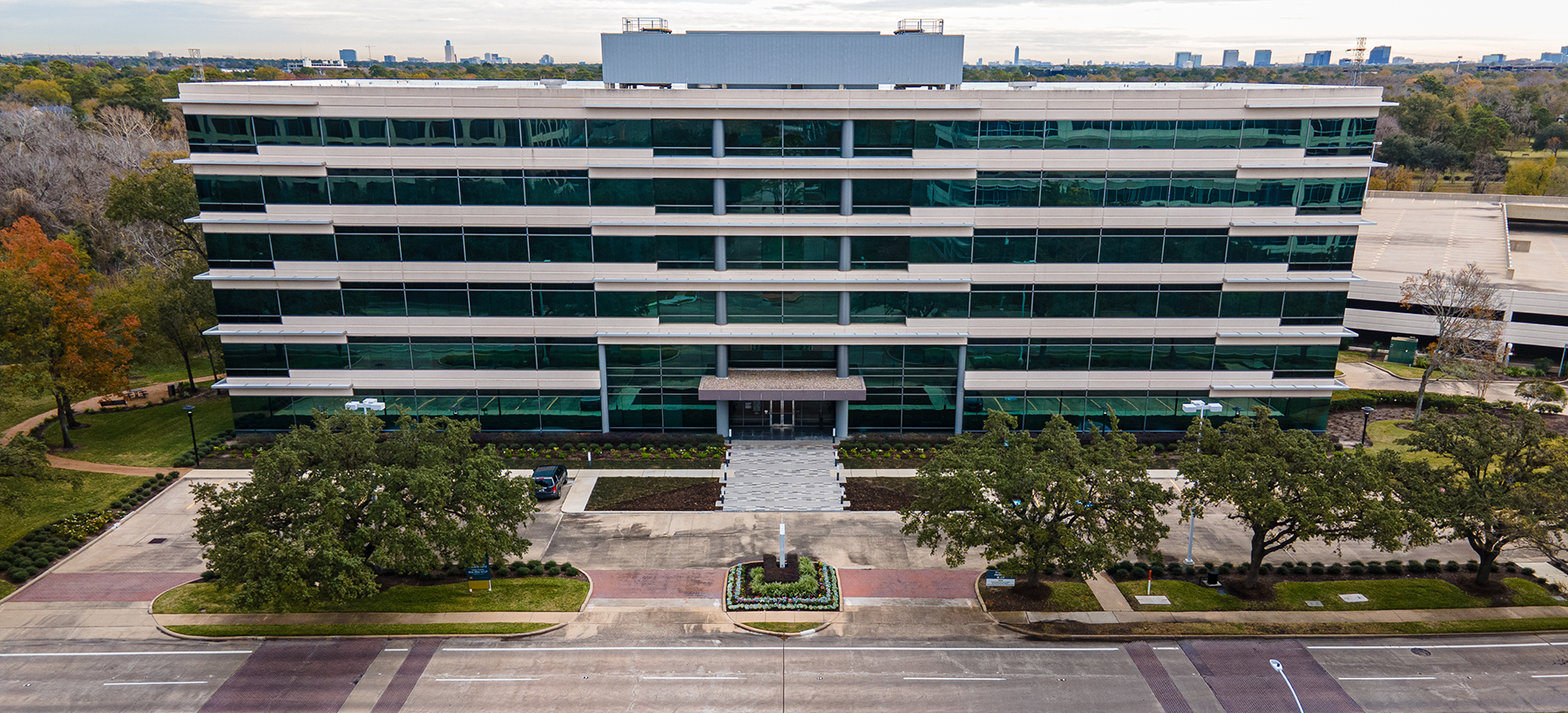
- Harmony Public Schools headquarters in Houston

Location
- Texas; United States

District information
- Type: Public charter school
- Established: 2000
- Superintendent: Fatih Ay
- Chair of the board: Oner Ulvi Celepcikay
- Governing agency: Texas Education Agency
- Schools: 61
- Budget: $579,800,000 (2026)

Students and staff
- Enrollment: 45,000 (2024)
- Faculty: 5,000 (approx.)
- Colors: Red, Blue & White

Other information
- Tax ID: 76-0615245
- Website: www.harmonytx.org

Harmony Public Schools (or HPS) is a charter management organization that operates the largest network of charter schools in Texas, with 61 campuses serving students from kindergarten through 12th grade. Established in 2000, Harmony emphasizes Science, technology, engineering, and mathematics (STEM) education. It is headquartered in the Southwest Management District (formerly Greater Sharpstown), Houston.

== History ==
In the late 1990s, a group of graduate students applied to create a charter school system with a strong focus on science and math education. Their proposal was approved by the Texas Education Agency in April 2000, and the first Harmony Public School opened the following August in the Meyerland neighborhood of Houston. Its first class had 200 students. Cosmos Foundation sponsored the establishment of the school.

Initially, Harmony Public Schools served students in grades 6-12. In 2005, the network opened its first elementary schools. By the end of that year, its enrollment across Texas consisted of approximately 1,200 students. Harmony continued to open new campuses over the next two years. By May 2007, Harmony was operating schools a total of nine schools across Houston, Austin, Fort Worth, Dallas, San Antonio, and El Paso.

By 2010, Harmony had become the largest charter network in Texas, containing 33 campuses and serving approximately 16,500 students. By 2016, Harmony had grown further to include 46 campuses serving over 30,000 students.

By the end of 2024, the network has 61 campuses and 45,000 students. In February 2025, Harmony purchased a six-story office building in the Houston Energy Corridor to use as its new administrative headquarters.

== Academics ==
Harmony Public Schools place an emphasis on STEM, character education, and college readiness. The school system employs a project-based learning model and its students are encouraged to participate in academic contests. Outside of regular school hours, Harmony offers tutoring for students who need additional instruction as well as time-intensive extracurricular activities such as robotics.

The school system has offered programs focused on college readiness and support, including its GraduLet program, which began in 2020. The GraduLet program initially provided alumni and staff who previously had been unable to complete their college degrees with support finding an online university, securing financial aid, and career counseling services. In 2023, the program expanded to include all Texas residents. In 2023, Harmony set up a partnership with UT Arlington, through which Harmony students could gain experience of the college's campus, and UTA students who are graduates of Harmony could receive ongoing student support services from the school system. The school formed a partnership with Texas Woman's University in 2024 allowing Harmony students to sign up for the college's free tuition program.

In 2021, Harmony established the Harmony Virtual Academy, an online-only offering for students. The program was started in response to the COVID-19 pandemic, but has continued in the years since. In spring of 2024, about 240 students across Texas attended HVA classes.

=== Academic performance ===
In 2011, the Texas Education Agency (TEA) rated 21 out of 33 Harmony schools as either "Exemplary" or "Recognized," with the remaining schools receiving an "Acceptable" rating. In 2022, the TEA rated all of Harmony's districts in Houston as an "A" on its A to F accountability rating scale.

In January 2024, Eighteen Harmony campuses in Texas, including four in El Paso, were named "State Schools of Character" by Character.org for their commitment to character development and community leadership. As of 2024, Harmony had 40 State School of Character winners and 21 National School of Character winners, the highest number among U.S. school systems for character education.

=== Participation in competitions ===
Harmony Schools hosted several I-SWEEEP (International Sustainable World Energy, Engineering, and Environment Project), an international science fair. The event held at the George R. Brown Convention Center in Houston.

== Management and operations ==
=== Financial operations ===
Five Harmony schools in Austin reported spending $7,923 per student, approximately $800 less than the statewide average and $1,600 below the Austin Independent School District average. According to Kate Alexander of the Austin American-Statesman, the schools achieved strong academic performance despite operating "on a shoestring."

In 2012, it was reported that the Harmony network also provides management and consulting services to other charter school networks. According to Tarim, Cosmos, the managing entity of Harmony, offers consulting services to the School of Science and Technology in San Antonio, which is operated by the Riverwalk Education Foundation and governed by an independent school board separate from Harmony Public Schools.

In 2024, the Texas Association of School Business Officials (TASBO) awarded Harmony Public Schools its highest honors for financial responsibility, including the Award of Excellence for Financial Management and the Award of Merit for Purchasing Operations. Harmony was the first Texas public charter school to receive the Award of Merit in 2019 and the Award of Excellence in 2023, earning both recognitions again in 2024. In October the same year, Harmony announced $15 million in bonuses for teachers and staff, with average stipends ranging from $3,000 to $4,000. Harmony also participates in the Teacher Incentive Allotment program, providing high-performing teachers with annual rewards of up to $30,000.

== Criticism ==
In May 2016, Amsterdam & Partners LLP filed a complaint with the Texas Education Agency (TEA) alleging Harmony Public Schools engaged in employment discrimination based on national origin and gender, improper vendor selection, and misappropriation of public funds. The complaint also raised concerns about potential ties to the Gülen movement, led by Turkish cleric Fethullah Gülen.

=== Use of H1-B visas ===
As of 2011, Harmony Public Schools faced scrutiny for its use of H-1B visas to employ Turkish-born staff, with 292 out of 1,500 employees working under the program, and for awarding contracts to Turkish-owned businesses. Despite these criticisms, the schools received praise for their academic performance and were recognized as one of the highest-rated charter school networks in Texas.

As of the 2016–17 school year, 197 of Harmony Public Schools' 3,500 employees, or less than 7%, were on H1-B visas, primarily from Turkey, a decrease from previous years when 20% of the workforce held such visas.

=== Influence of Gülen movement ===
Harmony schools has been accused at many events of having ties to the Gülen movement, a global network inspired by Turkish cleric Gülen. While critics suggest alignment with Gülen's teachings, Harmony officials deny any formal connection to the movement.

=== Civil rights compliance review ===
Harmony Public Schools underwent a compliance review by the United States Department of Education's Office for Civil Rights (OCR) to assess adherence to Title VI of the 1964 Civil Rights Act (prohibiting discrimination based on race, color, or national origin), Section 504 of the Rehabilitation Act (prohibiting discrimination based on disability in federally funded education programs), and Title II of the 1990 Americans with Disabilities Act (prohibiting disability-based discrimination by public entities). The review determined that while HPS's admissions policies and procedures appeared non-discriminatory, the enrollment of students with disabilities and English-language learners was notably lower compared to public school districts in the same areas. The investigation was resolved in late 2014 after HPS submitted proposals to address the issues identified by the OCR.

== Superintendents/CEOs ==
- Dr. Soner Tarim (2000-2017)
- Fatih Ay (2017-present)

=== Austin ===
- Harmony Science Academy (PK-8)
- Harmony School of Science (K-5)
- Harmony School of Innovation (PK-5)
- Harmony Science Academy-Pflugerville (6–12)
- Harmony School of Excellence (6–12)
- Harmony Science Academy Cedar Park (PK-5)
- Harmony School of Endeavor (PK-12)

=== Beaumont ===
- Harmony Science Academy Elementary (K-5)
- Harmony Middle-High (6-12)

=== Brownsville ===
- Harmony Science Academy (K-8)
- Harmony School Of Innovation (6–12)

=== Bryan/College Station ===
- Harmony Science Academy (K-8)

=== Dallas ===
- Harmony School of Innovation-Carrollton (K-5)
- Harmony School of Excellence (6–12)
- Harmony Science Academy Dallas (K-12)
- Harmony Science Academy Carrollton (6–12)
- Harmony School of Innovation-Dallas (6–12)
- Harmony Science Academy Plano (K-5)
- Harmony Science Academy (K-5)
- Harmony Science Academy Garland (K-6)
- Harmony School of Innovation Garland (6-12)

=== El Paso ===
- Harmony School of Excellence (PreK-5)
- Harmony Science Academy (6–12)
- Harmony School of Innovation (K-12)
- Harmony School of Science (PreK-12)

=== Fort Worth ===
- Harmony Science Academy (K-2)
- Harmony Science Academy (3-6)
- Harmony School of Innovation (7–12)

=== Garland/Rowlett/Sachse ===
- Harmony Science Academy (K-6)
- Harmony School of Innovation (7–12)

=== Grand Prairie ===
- Harmony Science Academy (K-8)

=== Euless ===
- Harmony School of Innovation (K-5)
- Harmony Science Academy (6–12)

=== Houston ===
- Harmony School of Fine Arts and Technology (K-8)
- Harmony School of Excellence - Houston (K-8)
- Harmony School of Endeavor (K-8)
- Harmony School of Technology (K-8)
- Harmony School of Achievement (K-5)
- Harmony School of Enrichment (K-5)
- Harmony School of Advancement (9-12)
- Harmony Science Academy - Houston (9-12)
- Harmony School of Discovery (6-12)
- Harmony School of Exploration (K-5)

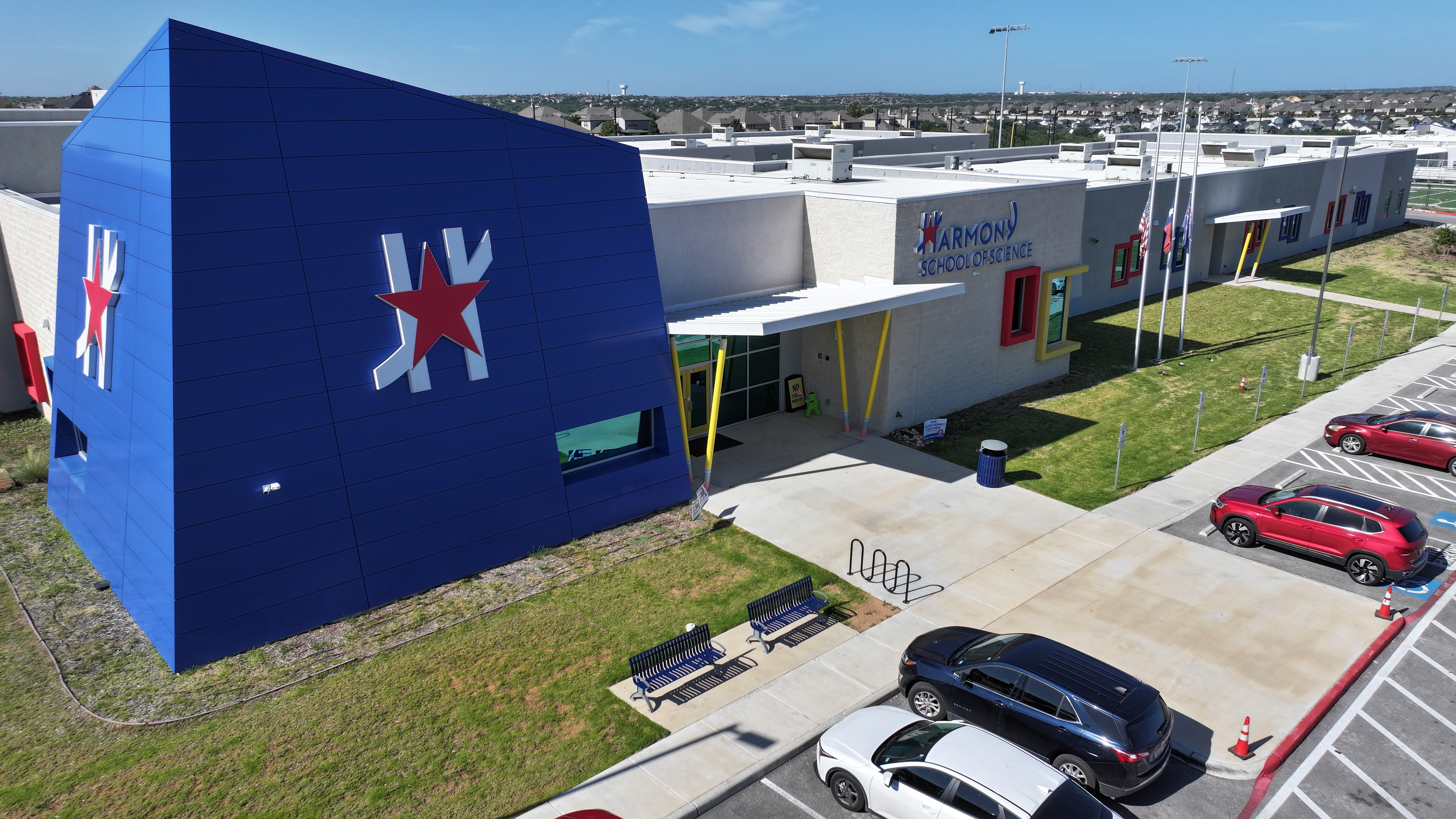
Harmony School of Science - San Antonio

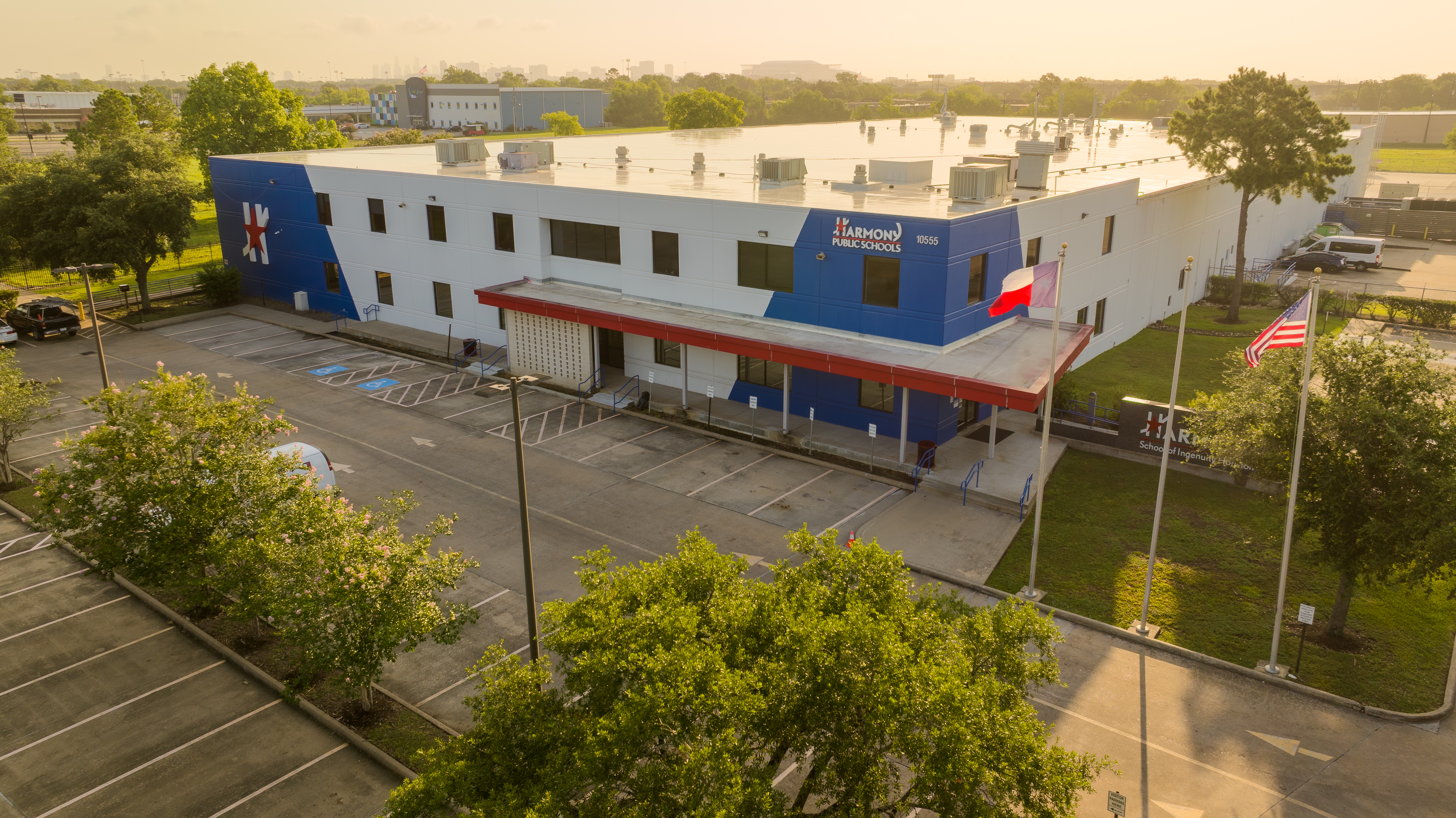
Harmony School of Ingenuity - Houston

- Harmony School of Ingenuity - Houston(6-12)
- Harmony School of Innovation - Katy (6-12)
- Harmony School of Innovation - Houston(6-8)
- Harmony School of Technology (6-8)
- Harmony Science Academy - Cypress (K-5)
- Harmony Science Academy - Katy (PK-3)
- Harmony Science Academy - Katy Middle (4-7)
- Harmony School of Innovation - Sugar Land (9-12)
- Harmony Science Academy - Bridgeland (K-6)
- Harmony Science Academy - City Place (K-6)
- Harmony School of Excellence - Katy (Elyson) (K-6)

=== Laredo ===
- Harmony School of Excellence (9-12)
- Harmony Science Academy (6-8)
- Harmony School of Innovation (K-5)

=== Lubbock ===
- Harmony Science Academy (PreK-8)

=== Odessa ===
- Harmony Science Academy (K-8)

=== San Antonio ===
- Harmony Science Academy (6-12)
- Harmony School of Innovation (Pre-K-8)
- Harmony School of Excellence (PreK-8)

=== Waco ===
- Harmony Science Academy (K-5)
- Harmony School of Innovation (6-12)

=== Midland ===
- Harmony Science Academy (Pre-K-8)

=== Odessa ===
- Harmony Science Academy (K-8)
- Harmony school of Innovation (Pre-K-8)

== Awards and recognitions ==
- 2009-10 - HSA Houston was awarded by U.S. News & World Report a 'Bronze' medal in 2009 and a 'Silver' Medal in 2010.
- 2011 - 21 of the 33 Harmony schools were rated as "Exemplary" or "Recognized" by the Texas Education Agency (TEA).
- 2011 - Two of the Harmony schools were named "Miracle Schools".
- 2017 - The Broad Prize for Public Charter Schools - Finalist.
- 2019 - The first public charter school to win the Award of Merit by the Texas Association of School Business Officials (TASBO).
- 2023 - 23 Harmony campuses were recognized in the "Best High Schools in America" list, the highest number for any public charter school network in Texas.
- 2023 - The first public charter school to win the Award of Excellence in Financial Management by TASBO.
- 2024 - Harmony won both the Award of Excellence for Financial Management and Award of Merit for Purchasing Operations by TASBO.
- 2024 - 18 Harmony schools in Texas were recognized as "State Schools of Character" by Character.org for their efforts in character education.
- 2024 - It received the Texas CyberStar certificate from the Texas Department of Information Resources for its strong data protection and cybersecurity measures.
- 2024 - It received 43 awards from the National School Public Relations Association (NSPRA), making it the most award-winning program in America for 2024.
