= Veritas Academy (Austin, Texas) =

Private school in Austin, Texas, United States

Location
- 13401 Escarpment Blvd; Austin, Hays County, Texas 78739; United States; 30°10′06″N 97°54′44″W

Information
- Motto: Training hearts, minds, and hands for the glory of God
- Established: 2005
- Superintendent: Jef Fowler (2005–2024) Cameron Cook (2024--)
- Grades: Preschool–12
- Enrollment: ~800
- Campus size: 97 acres (39 ha)
- Colors: Blue, Silver
- Team name: Defenders
- Website: www.veritasacademy.net

Veritas Academy is a private classical Christian university-model school in Southwest Austin, Texas. It represents itself as being "a private, classical, college prep school that seeks to train hearts and minds for the glory of God through rigorous curricula, character education, competitive athletics, fine & performing arts, and an array of extra‐ and co-curricular activities". It has K-12 grades. Through eighth grade, students are partially homeschooled, with parents acting as "co-teachers" that assist with teaching and assessing students. It is a member of the Association of Classical and Christian Schools.

Veritas Academy operated on the property of Austin Oaks Church until 2018, when it moved to a new, permanent campus on Escarpment Boulevard. Since the new property is located on the Edward's Aquifer, only 39 of its 97 acres can be developed.

== Sports ==
Due to its small student body, Veritas' athletics programs are relatively limited. They are part of Texas Association of Private and Parochial Schools (TAPPS).

The school has maintained a 6-man football team, which has won the TAPPS state championship several times. They plan on transitioning to a standard 11-man team in the fall of 2024.

Other athletics are swimming, volleyball, basketball, tennis, soccer, and wrestling.

In 2024, Veritas started a golf team led by a Defender Dad.

== Fine Arts ==
Veritas offers many fine arts, from fall One Act and spring musical to band, drumline, and visual arts. The drumline and One Act programs have consistently placed in state competitions.

== Clubs ==
Veritas encourages the students to take initiative in leadership through clubs and student organizations. The students must present their clubs to the student life faculty to be approved. Upon approval, the club president must maintain attendance through the school year in order to keep the club active. The clubs, as of fall 2024, include:

- Juggling Club
- Business Club
- Crochet Club
- Trails Club
- Sand Volleyball Club
