= Hill Country Christian School =

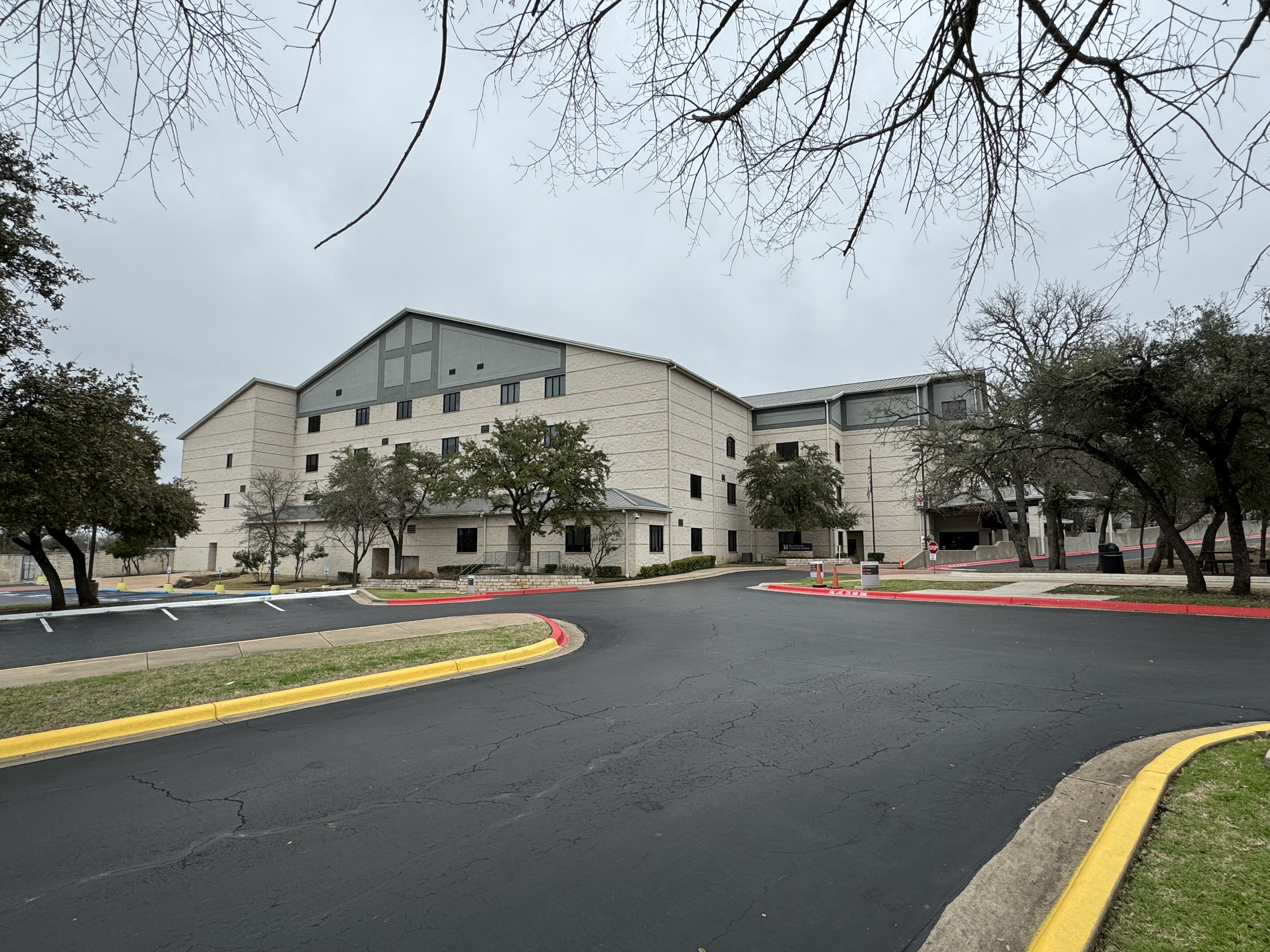

Location
- 12124 RR 620 North; Austin, Texas 78750; United States; 30°27′46″N 97°49′11″W

Information
- Opened: 1996
- Head of school: Jeff Marx
- Colors: navy, silver, white
- Mascot: Knights
- Website: www.hillcountrychristianschool.org

Hill Country Christian School of Austin is a private, classical, college-preparatory Christian school for students in grades PK-12. It is located in Austin, Texas. The school is a program of Hill Country Bible Church Austin and is housed at the church's Lakeline campus.

== Athletics ==
Hill Country Christian School participates in the Texas Association of Private and Parochial Schools (TAPPS). They compete at the 4A level in TAPPS at the high school level.
