= East Central Independent School District =

School district in Texas, United States

East Central Independent School District is a public school district located in (as its name suggests) the eastern central portion of Bexar County, Texas (USA).

The district includes all of China Grove and Elmendorf, as well as almost all of St. Hedwig, and parts of Converse, San Antonio, and Schertz.

In 2009, the school district was rated "academically acceptable" by the Texas Education Agency.

== History ==
In 2023 its enrollment was around 10,000. At that time the district's population was increasing, prompting it to open more schools. The district had proposed a bond in 2022. Voters voted in favor of the bond.

== Schools ==
High schools (grades 9-12)
Name	Established	Mascot	Colors	Additional information
CAST Lead High School			Yellow & Blue	Grades 8-12
East Central High School	1949	Hornets	Black & Gold	
East Central Summit High School	2028	TBD	TBD	

Middle schools (grades 6-8)
Name	Established	Mascot	Colors	Additional information
Heritage Middle School		Hurricanes	Red & Black	
Legacy Middle School	2006	Knights	Purple & Silver	
Valor Middle School	2026	Vipers	Red & Black	

Elementary schools (grades PK-5)
Name	Established	Mascot	Colors	Additional information
Elementary School #10	2027	TBD	TBD	
Harmony Elementary School	1986	Hawks	Red, Blue, & Brown	
Highland Forest Elementary School	2002	Eagles	Dark Green, Green, & Yellow	
Honor Elementary School	2024	Bobcats	Navy, Yellow, & Gray	
Oak Crest Elementary School		Stingers	Yellow & Black	Former intermediate
Pecan Valley STEM Academy	1974	Lions	Red & White	
Salado Elementary School		Patriots	Red, Navy, & White	Former intermediate and middle school
Sinclair Elementary School	1996	Mustangs	Gold, Black, & White	
Tradition Elementary School	2018	Titans	Forest, Mint, Charcoal, Chalk, & White	Replaced John Glenn Elementary
Victory Elementary School	2026	Raptors	Orange, Red, & Black	STEM Academy

Alternative Schools
Name	Additional information
Development Center	
Learning Academy	
