= Calvary Baptist Academy (New Braunfels, Texas) =

Location
- 177 W. Klein Road; New Braunfels, Texas 78130; United States
- 29.663118°N 98.095540°W

Information
- Type: Independent, Private, Christian
- Motto: "Valiant for Truth"
- Established: 1981
- Principal: Josh Tanner
- Faculty: 18
- Grades: PreK–12
- Enrollment: 130
- Campus: Suburban, 13 acres (0 km^{2})
- Colors: Blue, Black
- Athletics: 9 sports
- Mascot: Conquerors
- Curriculum: Abeka
- Website: cbatexas.org

Calvary Baptist Academy (CBA) is a private Preschool through 12th grade school located in New Braunfels, Texas in the United States. CBA is part of the educational ministry of Calvary Baptist Church. The school was founded in 1981. It uses online video to instruct students, with students averaging three to four hours a day watching instructional video provided by offsite teachers.
