= St. Paul's Preparatory Academy =

Private school in Texas, United States

Information
- Established: 1988; 38 years ago
- Website: www.stpaulsprep.com

St. Paul's Preparatory Academy is a private Christian school located in Arlington, Texas for early childhood through grade 12.

== History ==
The school was founded in 1988.
