= East Central High School (Texas) =

Location
- 7173 FM 1628; San Antonio, Bexar County, Texas 78263-9620; United States; 29.353582°N 98.296039°W

Information
- School type: Public, high school
- Locale: Rural: Fringe
- School district: East Central ISD
- NCES School ID: 481785001554
- Principal: Mary Alice Gomez
- Faculty: 184.89 (on an FTE basis)
- Grades: 9–12
- Enrollment: 3,252 (2022–2023)
- Student to teacher ratio: 17.59
- Colors: Black & Gold
- Athletics conference: UIL Class 6A
- Mascot: Hornets
- Website: East Central High School

East Central High School is a public high school located in unincorporated east central Bexar County, Texas outside San Antonio. It is part of the East Central Independent School District and classified as a 6A school by the University Interscholastic League. During 2022–2023, East Central High School had an enrollment of 3,252 students and a student to teacher ratio of 17.59. The school received an overall rating of "C" from the Texas Education Agency for the 2024–2025 school year.

== Athletics ==
The East Central Hornets compete in the following sports -

- Baseball
- Basketball
- Bowling
- Cheerleading
- Cross Country
- Dance
- Football
- Golf
- Powerlifting
- Soccer
- Softball
- Swimming
- Ten-pin bowling
- Tennis
- Track and Field
- Volleyball

=== State titles ===
- Boys Basketball -
  - 1995(5A)
- Girls Golf -
  - 1975(3A)
- Boys Bowling -
  - 2022(THSBC)

== Notable alumni ==
- Steve Lutz - Men's college basketball coach.
- NaLyssa Smith - WNBA Player, 2nd pick of the 2022 WNBA draft to the Indiana Fever.
- Henry Thomas - Actor, most notable for the role of Elliott in E.T. the Extra-Terrestrial
- Michael Toudouze - Former NFL player.
