= Five Points =

Five Points may refer to:

== Places ==
=== Canada ===
- The northern half of Oakwood-Vaughan, neighborhood in Toronto, Ontario

=== United States ===
- Alabama:
  - Five Points, Alabama, a town
  - Five Points South Historic District, Birmingham, listed on the National Register of Historic Places (NRHP) in Jefferson County
  - Five Points Historic District (Huntsville, Alabama), NRHP-listed
- Five Points, California
- Five Points, Denver, Colorado
- Florida:
  - Five Points, Florida
  - Five Points (Jacksonville), Florida
- Georgia:
  - Five Points (Athens), Georgia
  - Five Points, Atlanta, Georgia
    - Five Points station, Atlanta, Georgia
  - Little Five Points, community east of downtown Atlanta, Georgia
- Five Points, Indiana (disambiguation), multiple locations
- Five Points, Iowa
- Five Points, Michigan (disambiguation), multiple locations
- Five Points, Minnesota
- Five Points, Trenton, New Jersey
- Five Points, Manhattan, New York
- North Carolina:
  - Five Points, North Carolina
  - Five Points, Asheville
  - Five Points, Franklin County, North Carolina
  - Five Points Historic District (Albemarle)
  - Five Points Historic Neighborhoods (Raleigh)
- Five Points, Ohio (disambiguation), multiple locations
- Five Points, Pennsylvania (disambiguation), multiple locations
- Five Points (Columbia, South Carolina)
- Five Points, Texas
- Five Points, West Virginia
- Five Points, Wisconsin (disambiguation), multiple locations
- Five Points Historic District (disambiguation), multiple locations

== Other uses ==
- Five Points, a literary journal published by Georgia State University, named after the area in Atlanta
- Five Points (TV series), 2018
- Five Points Gang, Manhattan
- Quincunx, a geometric pattern consisting of five points arranged in a cross
- Five dots tattoo

== See also ==
- 5 Pointz, former warehouse and mural venue in Queens, New York City
- Five points determine a conic
- Five Points Correctional Facility, Romulus, New York
- Five Points of Calvinism
- Le Corbusier's Five Points of Architecture
- Five-point electoral law
- Five Point Plan, an American band
- Five Point Someone, a 2004 novel by Indian writer Chetan Bhagat, adapted into the 2009 film 3 Idiots
- Five-point stencil
- Five Corners (disambiguation)
- The 5 Point Cafe
