= Five Corners =

Five Corners may refer to:

== Places ==
=== Canada ===
- An area of the Boyle Street neighborhood of Edmonton, Alberta
- An intersection in Cloverdale, Surrey, British Columbia
- Five Corners, New Brunswick, a community
- Five Corners, Ontario, a township
- An intersection on Broadway Avenue in Saskatoon, Saskatchewan, Canada

=== Finland ===
- An intersection in the Punavuori neighbourhood of Helsinki

=== Poland ===
- Five Corners Square, an urban square in Warsaw, Poland

=== Russia ===
- Five Corners, Murmansk, the main square of Murmansk
- An intersection near the Russian Monument in Sofia
- A crossroad on Rubinstein Street in St. Petersburg

=== United States ===
- An intersection in the Irvington District of Fremont, California
- An intersection on Newspaper Row in San Francisco, California
- Five Corners, Indiana, a ghost town
- An area of Blackstone, Massachusetts
- An area of Holt, Michigan
- Five Corners, Jersey City, New Jersey, a neighborhood
- Five Corners, Michigan, an unincorporated community
- Five Corners, Newark, New Jersey, a landmark
- Five Corners, Perth Amboy, New Jersey, a neighborhood
- Five Corners, Ohio, a community
- Five Corners, Washington, a census-designated place
- Five Corners, Wisconsin (disambiguation), multiple places in Wisconsin
- Five Corners District, a management district in Houston, Texas
- Five Corners Historic District, South Williamstown, Massachusetts

==== New York ====
- Five Corners, New Windsor, New York
- Five Corners, Rotterdam, an intersection in New York
- Hamlets in:
  - Amboy, New York
  - Ballston, New York
  - Genoa, New York
  - Jasper, New York
  - Lenox, New York
  - Lynbrook, New York
  - New Berlin, New York
  - Onondaga, New York
  - Sangerfield, New York
  - Vails Gate, New York
  - Vestal, New York

=== Ukraine ===
- Five Corners Square (Chernihiv), an urban square in Chernihiv, Ukraine

== Other uses ==
- Five Corners (film)
- "Five Corners", a song by The Doobie Brothers from the 2004 album Live at Wolf Trap
- Five Corners, a fictional location in The Simpsons television series, modeled after the Four Corners Monument

== See also ==
- Four Corners (disambiguation)
- Five Points (disambiguation)
- UFV Five Corners, a satellite campus of University of the Fraser Valley, British Columbia, Canada
