= Corinthian Pointe, Houston =

Planned community in Houston, Texas, US

Coordinates: 29.630°N 95.474°W

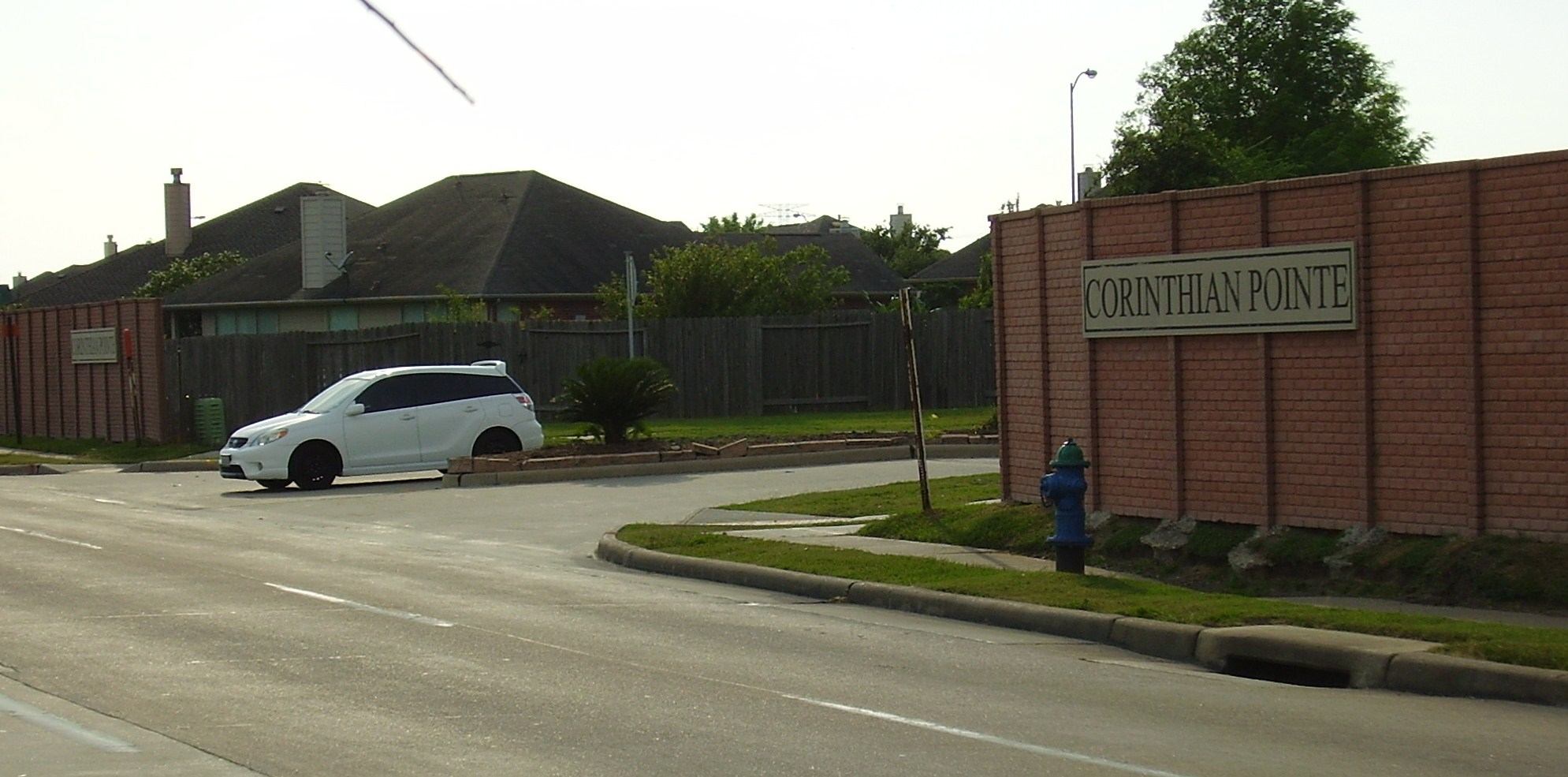
Corinthian Pointe

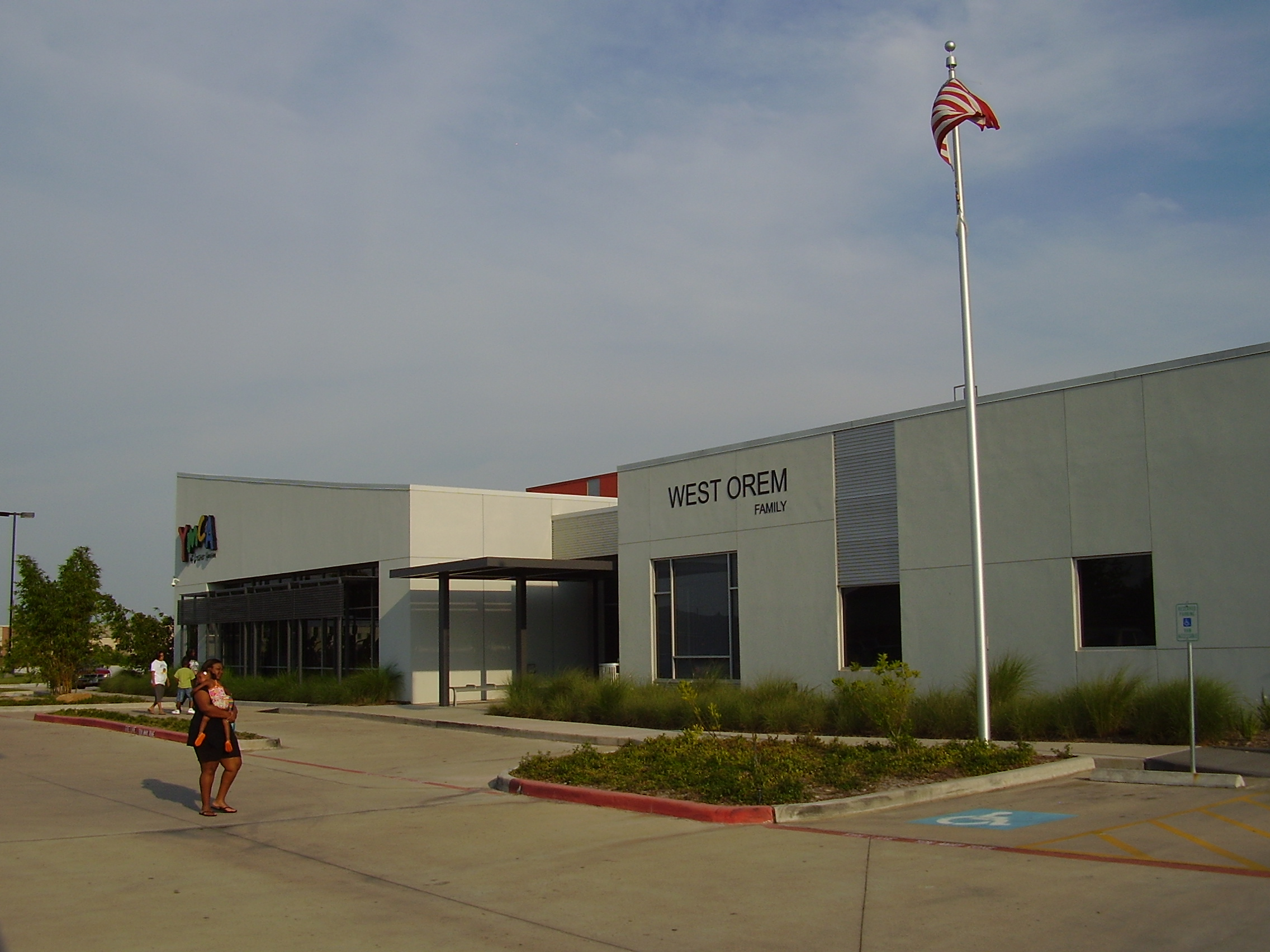
West Orem Family YMCA

Corinthian Pointe is a large planned affordable subdivision located in Houston, Texas, in the United States. It is a part of the larger master planned community Pointe 2.3.4, and is within the 5 Corners District.

Corinthian Pointe is located immediately outside the 610 Loop and inside Beltway 8 near Reliant Park. The Windsor Village United Methodist Church's Reverend Kirbyjon Caldwell, Pyramid Residential Community Corporation, and Ryland Homes established the community in the 2000s; the church is the largest United Methodist Church in the United States. Caldwell said that the neighborhood is the largest residential subdivision in Houston that was developed by a non-profit group. According to the church, it is the largest residential subdivision developed by a nonprofit group in the City of Houston.

The community, which spans 220 acres (0.89 km^{2}), included 462 homes by the end of 2006. The subdivision cost 173 million United States dollars to build. About 80% of the subdivision's homes are classified as "affordable" by the City of Houston according to Genora Boykins, the chairperson of Pyramid Residential Community Corporation.

The West Orem Family YMCA built for $7 million, Kingdom Builders' Community Center built for $68 million and including a church and a prayer center, the Zina Garrison Tennis Center built for $3.5 million, an independent living center built for $8.1 million, a children's medical clinic built for $1 million, and retail outlets that are next to and were developed for the subdivision.

== History ==
Around 2000 Kirbyjon Caldwell wanted to build a prayer chapel. He found a 234-acre (95 ha) plot. The owners were not willing to break up the entire plot, so a nonprofit development purchased the entire plot. That section became Pointe 2.3.4.

Corinthian Pointe opened in 2000, and construction of the first houses finished that year. Back then the average selling price per house was $80,000 ($149565.22 in today's money). Boykins said that low income families who received down-payment assistance from the City of Houston bought one third of the homes in the neighborhood. 451 homes opened prior to April 2006, and 11 homes were scheduled to be completed by the end of the year. By April 2006 the average selling price was $106,000 per home ($169288.54 in today's money). Of the houses, 80 percent were sold at below-market prices to lower income families; the selling prices ranging from $69,000 ($110197.26 in today's money) to $103,990 ($166078.45 in today's money). The rest of them were sold between the $100,000s (range beginning at $186956.52 in today's money) and the $140,000s (range beginning at $223588.64 in today's money).

George E. Johnson Sr., the community's developer, said that because Corinthian Pointe was successful, other homebuilders decided to build on nearby plots of land. Johnson said "Here's a market that's been overlooked. It's not too far from downtown, but the growth had passed over it".

== Geography ==
The subdivision is off of West Orem Drive, west of South Post Oak Boulevard. It is located north of Windsor Village. It is near U.S. Highway 90A, southwest of NRG Park. John Nash, a resident quoted in a 2006 Houston Chronicle article, said that Corinthian Pointe's location is "ideal" due to proximity to the Texas Medical Center, The Galleria, and Beltway 8. It is located between the ZIP codes of 77085 and 77045. It was built on former pastureland. The average square footage of the homes in the subdivision range from 1,300 square feet (120 m^{2}) to 2,200 square feet (200 m^{2}).

== Government and infrastructure ==
=== Local government ===
The neighborhood is within the Houston Police Department's Southwest Patrol Division, headquartered at 4503 Beechnut Street. The neighborhood is within City Council District D. As of 2008 Wanda Adams represents the district.

=== County, state, and federal representation ===
As of 2017, Harris County Precinct One, headed by Commissioner Rodney Ellis, serves Corinthian Pointe.

The Harris Health System (formerly Harris County Hospital District) designated the Martin Luther King Health Center for the ZIP code 77085. The designated public hospital is Ben Taub General Hospital in the Texas Medical Center.

Corinthian Pointe is located in District 131 of the Texas House of Representatives served by Representative Alma A. Allen. Corinthian Pointe is also within District 13 of the Texas Senate represented by Senator Borris L. Miles.

Corinthian Pointe is in Texas's 9th congressional district represented by Congressman Al Green.

== Education ==
=== Primary and secondary schools ===
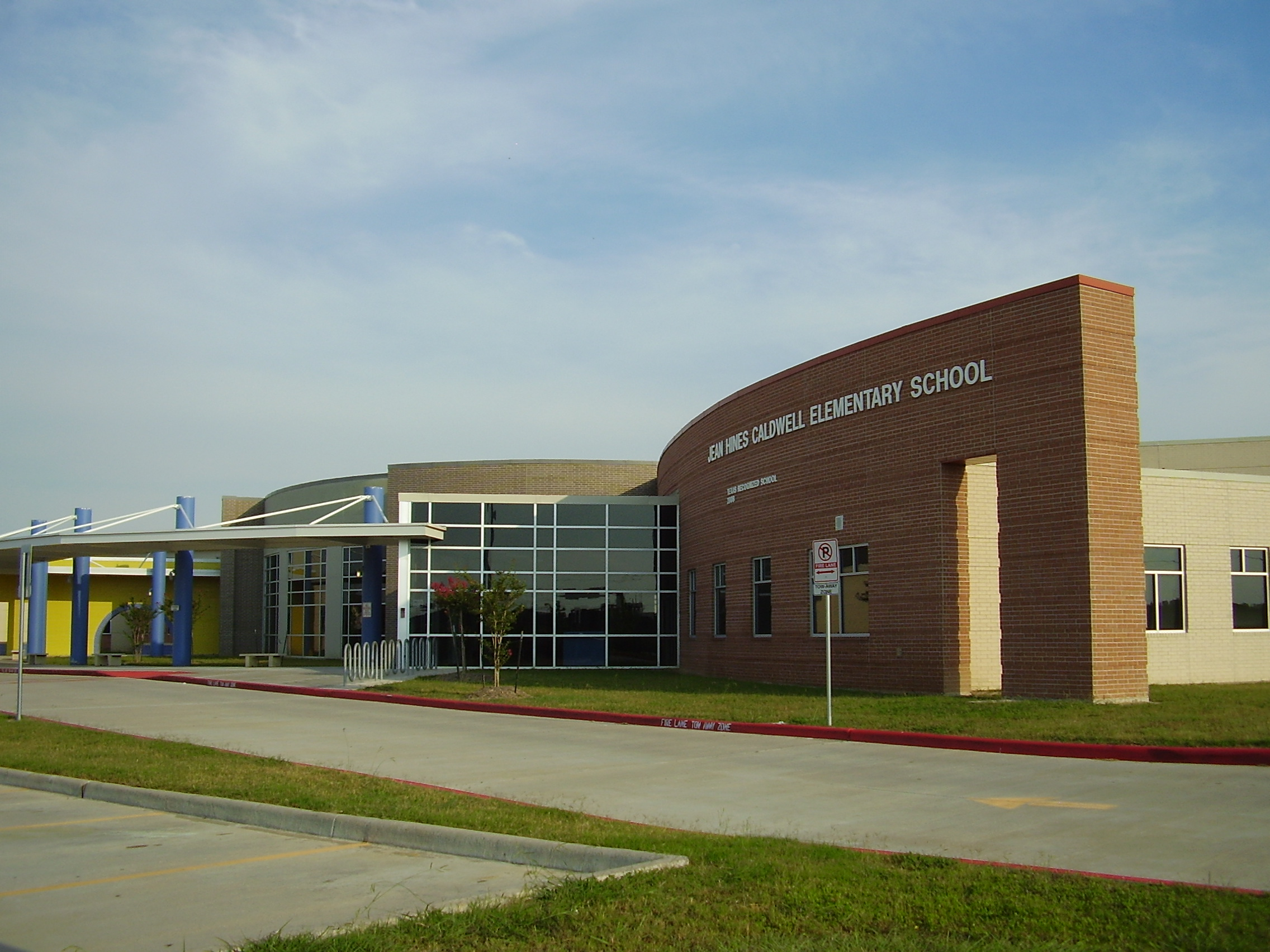
Jean Hines-Caldwell Elementary School

The neighborhood is zoned to Houston Independent School District (HISD) schools. Corinthian Pointe is within Trustee District IX, represented by Lawrence Marshall as of 2008.

The zoned schools include Jean Hines-Caldwell Elementary School, Lawson Middle School (formerly Dowling Middle School), and Madison High School. Prior to the opening of Hines-Caldwell, Corinthian Pointe was zoned to Windsor Village Elementary School.

King Early Childhood Center is the closest public early childhood center to Corinthian Pointe and Red Elementary School is the closest school with a tuition-based early childhood program. Only economically disadvantaged students, homeless students, students who are not proficient in English, or children of active-duty members of the U.S. military or whose parent has been killed, injured, or missing in action while on active duty may be enrolled in tuition-free HISD preschools. Students who are eligible for HISD's preschools may attend any Early Childhood Center in Houston ISD for free. Students not eligible may enroll in tuition-based HISD preschool programs.

Originally planned to be named Corinthian Pointe Elementary School, Hines-Caldwell opened in fall 2005. Hines-Caldwell opened as part of the Corinthian Pointe subdivision. Hines-Caldwell, dedicated on Sunday November 13, 2005, was named after Jean LaNell Hines Caldwell, Kirbyjon Caldwell's mother. Dowling opened in 1968 and Madison opened in 1965, before the establishment of Corinthian Pointe.

The Imani School, a K-8 private school, is located at 12401 South Post Oak Road, near Corinthian Pointe.

=== Community colleges ===
The area is within the Houston Community College System.

== Health care ==
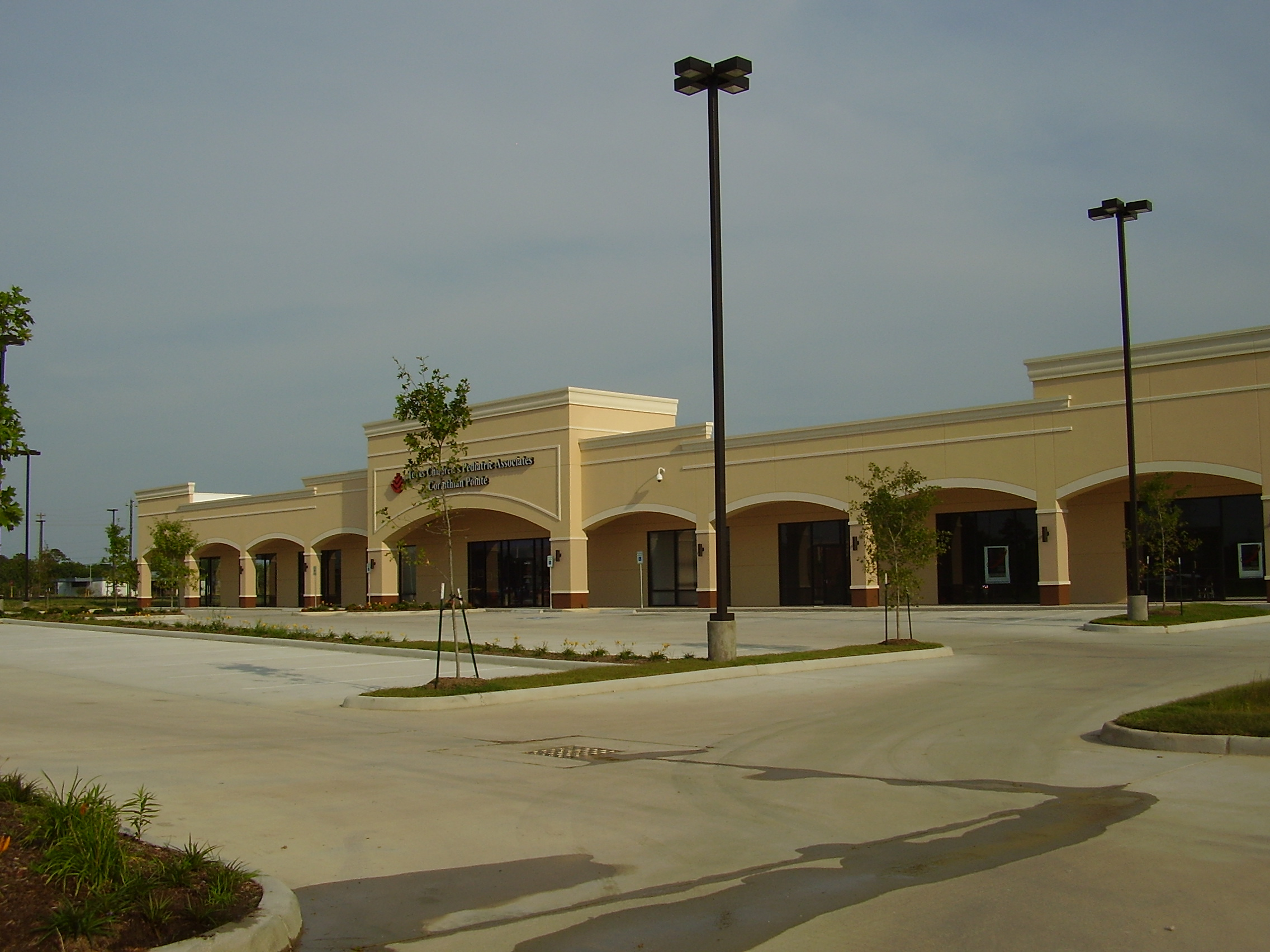
Texas Children's Hospital Pediatric Associates Corinthian Pointe

Texas Children's Hospital operates the Pediatric Associates Corinthian Pointe clinic in Corinthian Pointe. The facility, part of Project Medical Home, a project designed to provide primary pediatric care in areas underserved by health care systems, opened in 2009.

== See also ==
- Neighborhoods in Houston
- Kirbyjon Caldwell
- History of the African-Americans in Houston
- Christianity in Houston
