= Houston Sports Park =

Urban park in Houston, Texas

- HSP
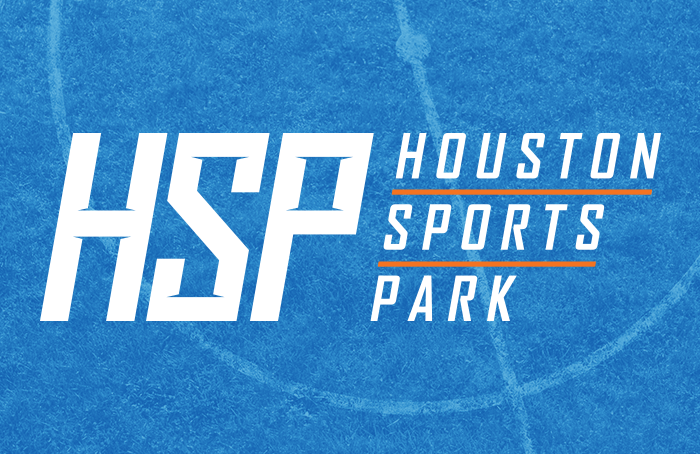
- Interactive map of Houston Sports Park
- Type: Municipal (Houston, Texas)
- Coordinates: 29°38′17″N 95°23′45″W
- Area: 117.96 acres (47.74 ha)
- Opened: 2011 (formerly known as Houston Amateur Sports Park)
- Operator: City of Houston; Houston Dynamo; Houston Parks Board
- Visitors: 5,381 hours of use (in 2017)
- Open: 8:00 a.m. – 11:00 p.m.
- Status: Open all year
- Parking: Over 400 vehicles
- Public transit: 87 Sunnyside / TMC
- Website: www.houstonsportspark.com

Houston Sports Park is an urban park that serves as a multi-purpose sports and entertainment facility in the Five Corners District of Houston near the neighborhood of City Park. Houston Sports Park (HSP) houses Sabercats Stadium, which is the home of the Houston SaberCats of Major League Rugby and is the training ground of the Houston Dynamo, Houston Dash and its academy teams. The facility is made up of the Memorial Hermann Champions Field, one artificial turf field, and five additional grass fields.

== Description ==
The campus building is a single-story building which houses Athlete Training + Health (18,505 sq. feet) along with a 7,000 sq. foot tenant suite for the Methodist Center for Sports Medicine (home to the physicians for the Houston Dynamo, Texans, Astros, Rodeo and Ballet). The Methodist Center for Sports Medicine features a HydroWorx 1200 advanced underwater treadmill pool. Additionally, there is 5,125 square foot permanent training center for the Houston Dynamo.

The completed portion currently in use is known as Phase One of the construction project that began in 2011. Fundraising for Phase Two is underway which will provide seven more lighted fields, restroom pavilion, misting stations, picnic facilities, trails, playground and additional parking. The estimated cost to complete the complex is $12 million.

== History ==
=== Planning ===
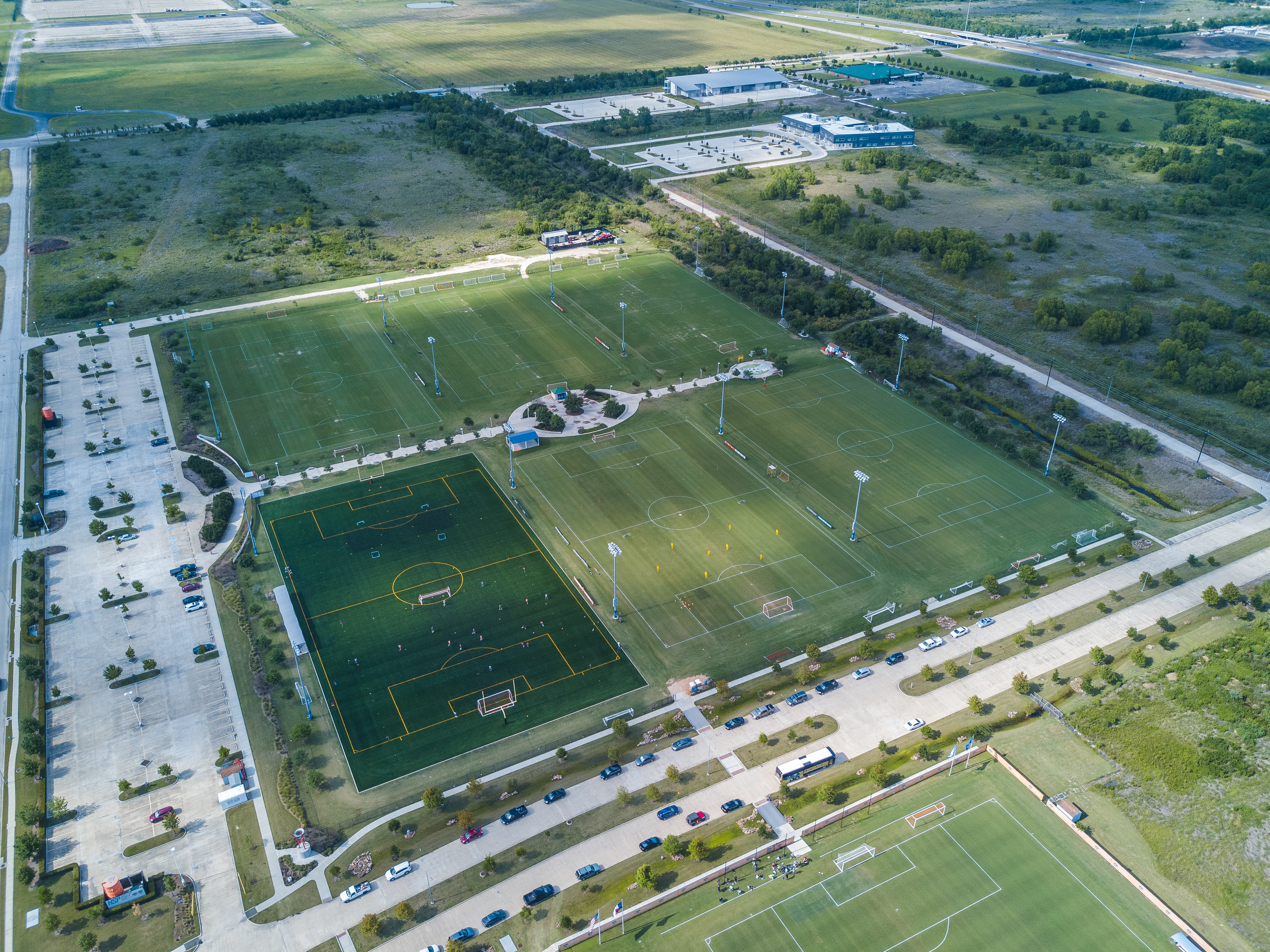
Aerial view of a portion of the park in 2017

When the San Jose Earthquakes of Major League Soccer relocated to Houston to become the Houston Dynamo in 2005, team ownership Anschutz Entertainment Group (AEG), expressed a strong desire to have both a permanent stadium and training facility. While pursuing what would become BBVA Compass Stadium, Houston Sports Park was simultaneously planned and constructed.

Initially, the city-owned Gus Wortham Golf Course in Houston's East End was proposed to be re-purposed for use. However, Houston Mayor Bill White and district councilwoman Carol Alvarado soon publicly opposed the idea, and attention shifted elsewhere. By late 2007, the city began looking to relatively undeveloped south Houston to acquire land, and two sites along the South Freeway (at Airport Boulevard and Almeda-Genoa Road) were considered.

=== Funding and construction ===
Throughout 2008, the City of Houston purchased several adjoining tracts of land adjacent to the Houston Community College South Campus and parallel to the South Freeway at Airport Boulevard, and re-platted it as "Houston Amateur Sports Park" the following year. On June 25, 2008, the City of Houston and the Houston Dynamo officially announced plans for a 100-acre, 18-field park to the public. The following day, a public event where Mayor Bill White and other city officials were in attendance, was held at the nearby Houston Community College South Campus. On December 16, 2009, the city awarded a US$4.2 million contract to South Coast Construction, Inc. to build a new portion of Kirby Drive from Airport Boulevard to nearby Sims Bayou throughout the park.

On November 9, 2011, the City of Houston created a municipally owned corporation called the "Houston Amateur Sports Park LGC" to build, manage, and operate the Sports Park land as a recreational sports field and training facility for the public and community. The local government corporation is managed by an eleven-member board nominated by the mayor and confirmed by the city council.

On May 28, 2014, the City of Houston acquired 32 more adjoining acres to add to the park.

=== Further additions ===
On February 7, 2018, the City of Houston agreed to fund $3.2 million of the $15.25 million needed to build Aveva Stadium at Houston Sports Park for the Houston SaberCats of Major League Rugby. The stadium was completed in April 2019 and has a capacity for 4,000 spectators.
