= Windsor Village United Methodist Church =

United Methodist megachurch in Windsor Village, Southwest Houston, Texas

Coordinates: 29.6220°N 95.4728°W

The Windsor Village Church Family is a United Methodist church in the Windsor Village neighborhood of Southwest Houston, Texas.

As of April 2026, the church's senior pastor is Suzette Caldwell who was assigned in 2020. Prior to 2020, Kirbyjon Caldwell was its senior pastor for over thirty-eight years.

Formerly a megachurch, Windsor Village UMC has an average Sunday attendance across its multiple services of 1,200, down from 3,700 in 2018, 2,700 in 2019, and 2,600 in 2020. In 2013, the church had 17,045 members, making it one of the largest Methodist churches in the United States, but the membership has drastically fell off. The number is hard to account for as the church fails consistently to pay apportionments.

The church membership is mostly Black; in 2001, the church was one of six mostly black United Methodist churches in the U.S. with a membership of over 3,000 members, and one of 94 churches total with a membership of over 3,000. In the mid-2000s, it was one of the largest Black churches in the US.

== History ==
Up to the late 1970s, the congregation was almost all white.

In 1982, Windsor Village UMC had 25 members. Kirbyjon Caldwell became the pastor of the church that year.

In 2005, Kathy Taylor, the church soloist, and the church announced plans to record a live gospel CD.

== Activities ==
The church has over 90 ministries. The church oversees the Imani School, a private elementary and middle school, and it is one of the church's ministries. Kingdom Builders Business Corp. serves as the church's nonprofit division. The church established nine non-profit organizations since 1982. The Power Center, is a 104,000-square-foot (9,700 m^{2}) complex intended to promote economic growth, is one of its non-profit projects.

Leader's High School for Business and Economic Success, a Houston Independent School District charter school, was located on the church property.

== Relationship with Windsor Village community ==
Mary Ann Fergus of the Houston Chronicle said in 2003 that Windsor Village "residents differ in their view of this neighbor. Some say the church draws nothing but traffic and that then-pastor Kirbyjon Caldwell and his staff were not as involved in the civic club as they were in prior decades. Others contend the church has always been an asset and recently improved the neighborhood via its developmental arm, Pyramid Community Development Corp."

== See also ==
- Christianity in Houston
- Corinthian Pointe, Houston
- History of African Americans in Houston
