= WUGA =

WUGA may refer to:

- WUGA (FM), a radio station (91.7 FM) licensed to serve Athens, Georgia, United States
- WGTA (TV), a television station (channel 24, virtual channel 32.1) licensed to serve Toccoa, Georgia, which used the call sign WUGA-TV from 2011 to 2015
