= Vaught House =

Vaught House may refer to:

- Vaught House (Huntsville, Alabama), listed on the National Register of Historic Places in Madison County, Alabama
- Vaught House (Arlington, Texas), listed on the National Register of Historic Places in Tarrant County, Texas
