= Windsor Village, Houston =

Community in Houston, Texas

Coordinates: 29.620°N 95.473°W

Windsor Village is a community in Houston, in the U.S. state of Texas. The Windsor Village United Methodist Church is located in the community. The name of the community reflected a British motif popular in the late 1950s and early 1960s.

== History ==
Windsor Village was developed in the 1950s and 1960s. Mary Ann Fergus of the Houston Chronicle said that thirty years prior to 2003, the community, back then an all White neighborhood, "seemed remote." Around that period the first black families moved in.

Fergus said that Windsor Village "was going down for the count" in the mid-1990s. She said that "Old furniture, broken cars and trash covered many of the lawns, driveways and grassy boulevards in the neighborhood. Teenagers sold drugs on the streets. Home values had plummeted." As a response, activity in the Windsor Village Civic Club increased as residents sought to remove the social ills. Fergus said that "[t]he neighborhood looked neater and work with police had pushed out the drug dealers." Houses that were previously rental homes became owned homes. Fergus said that the new homeowners had more pride in the upkeep than the previous people. In 2000 the median house price in Windsor Village increased to $49 per square foot. This was 31% higher than the increase in 1999. In 2003 Fergus said "Race relations are much better, by all accounts."

Around 2006 studies from the University of Houston and the City of Houston declared that the area around Windsor Village United Methodist Church was underserved by corporate development, social services, and amenities.

== Cityscape ==
Windsor Village is located off of South Post Oak, near the intersection of South Post Oak and West Orem. Its boundaries are Darlinghurst Drive to the north, Tiffany Drive to the south, Altair Way to the east, and Warkworth Drive to the west. Corinthian Pointe is north of Windsor Village. The community is between Interstate 610 and Beltway 8 and it is 15 miles (24 km) from Downtown Houston.

Windsor Village has large brick, ranch houses and large lawns. Mary Ann Fergus of the Houston Chronicle said that the houses and lawns give the community "a comfortable sofa feel". The community has many trees, including pine trees and palm trees.

== Demographics ==
As of 2003 most residents were African-American, middle income, and middle-aged. During that year, young Hispanic families who moved in more recently and older White people together made up 20% of the community.

In the wider area around Windsor Village United Methodist Church, one third of the area adult residents did not complete high school.

== Culture ==
Windsor Village United Methodist Church, headed by Kirbyjon Caldwell, is located in Windsor Village. In 2000 it was the largest Methodist church in the United States, with 13,498 members. In 2006 it was also one of the largest Black churches in the US. In 2003 6,000 people attended each Sunday morning or Saturday evening service."

Mary Ann Fergus of the Houston Chronicle said in 2003 "Residents differ in their view of this neighbor. Some say the church draws nothing but traffic and that Pastor Kirbyjon Caldwell and his staff are not as involved in the civic club as they were 20 years ago. Others contend the church has always been an asset and recently improved the neighborhood via its developmental arm, Pyramid Community Development Corp."

== Education ==
Windsor Village is within the Houston Independent School District.

Most of the community is zoned to Windsor Village Elementary School. In 1976 the school gained the Vanguard program. In 1992 the Vanguard students included 100 White children, 90 black children, 30 Asian children, and some Hispanic children. Their parents were relatively affluent. The neighborhood component was mostly African-American and low income. During that year the Associated Press stated that the program "has been extremely popular." During that year, the Vanguard programs had a separate parent organization that paid for improvements that improved the Vanguard students, who were on one side of the campus, but not the neighborhood students on the other side. Parents of the neighborhood students complained that the neighborhood students were segregated and were receiving inferior services. In 1992 the principal, Sandra Satterwhite, said that the parent groups would merge. In the northern hemisphere spring of 1993 the neighborhood and Vanguard classrooms were placed next to one another so students from both groups would be near each other. In 2007 the school had 726 students.

A portion of Windsor Village is zoned to Jean Hines-Caldwell Elementary School in Corinthian Pointe. All residents are zoned to Dowling Middle School and Madison High School. In addition, the HISD charter school Leader's Academy High School for Business and Academic Success is located on the property of the Windsor Village United Methodist Church in Windsor Village.

The main building of Windsor Village Elementary was completed in 1960. Four years later, a second wing was added. Like the neighborhood, the school's name reflected a British motif popular in the late 1950s and early 1960s. Madison opened in 1965. Dowling was built in 1968. Prior to the opening of Hines-Caldwell, Windsor Village Elementary served all of the neighborhood. Hines-Caldwell opened in fall 2005. The Imani School, a Christian private school, opened in 1988 in the Windsor Village Church complex. The school now resides in the Power Center, a complex outside of Windsor Village that was completed in 1995.

== Parks and recreation ==
Windsor Village Park and Community Center, municipal facilities, are in Windsor Village. They are adjacent to the elementary school. The community earmarked the complex for a $1 million improvement in the year 2005. Aside from the community center building, the park has an outdoor basketball pavilion, lighted tennis courts, a lighted athletic field, and a playground.
