= Watkinsville lynching =

1905 mass lynching in Georga, US

Coordinates: 33°51′46″N 83°24′29″W

The Watkinsville lynching was a mass lynching that occurred in Watkinsville, Georgia, United States on June 30, 1905. The lynching, which saw a large mob seize nine men from a local jail and kill eight of them by gunfire, has been described as "one of the worst episodes of racial violence ever in Georgia."

== History ==
In May 1905, a storekeeper named F. M. Holbrook and his wife were murdered in Oconee County, Georgia. In the aftermath, one white man, Lon Aycock and three African American men were arrested, with Aycock accused of the murder and the three African American men accused of being accomplices to the murder. They were held in the jail in Oconee County along with six other individuals, all African American men held for various reasons.

According to The Oconee Enterprise, local newspapers at the time praised residents of the county for "not rushing to judgment". However, at midnight on June 29, a large mob of individuals, reportedly from nearby Morgan County, Georgia, organized and traveled to Oconee County. At 2 a.m. on June 30, 1905, this large mob of between approximately 50 and 100 people (Note: Sources vary on the number of individuals in the group. A 1905 report in The Voice of the Negro gives the number as 100, while a 2007 article in the Savannah Morning News says "at least 50 people" and a 2020 story from WUGA says "as many as 50 white men".) broke into the Oconee County jail. The mob, consisting of masked white men, went to the house of the town marshal and compelled him to take them to the county jail, where the jailer relinquished the keys to the jail cells at gunpoint. Afterwards, they seized nine of the ten prisoners, including Aycock, and proceeded to tie them to nearby fence posts. One prisoner had avoided the attention of the mob and was left in his cell. Of the nine men seized by the mob, only one had been convicted of a crime, while the others were awaiting trial. After tying the men to the posts, they proceeded to open fire on the men, with the New-York Tribune reporting that "five volleys" were fired at the men. Eight of the men died as a result of the gunfire, while one man survived and proceeded to play dead.

Following the lynching, several of the bodies were buried in the same grave, leading a historian to say in an interview with CNN that "within an hour of Atlanta is a mass grave". One of the victims, Sandy Price, was identified by his mother, and he is the only victim with an identified grave. A photograph of the dead bodies, still tied to the fence, was taken shortly after the murders.

In 2007, the lynching attracted national attention as part of a story by CNN. Following this, a group that had worked to identify the graves of the victims in the Moore's Ford lynchings, a 1946 lynching that had occurred on the border between Oconee County and Walton County, Georgia, announced that they would work to identify the unmarked graves of the Watkinsville victims. In 2020, on the 115th anniversary of the lynching, a vigil was held in Watkinsville for the victims, with attendees organizing at the former site of the jail and marching to the grave of Sandy Price, where they paid their respects to the victims. In 2025, a second vigil was held at the county courthouse. The vigil included the unveiling of a memorial plaque dedicated to the victims.

== Bibliography ==
- Giles, Blake (June 17, 2015). "Family history clouded by murder, lynching". The Oconee Enterprise.
- Thirty Years of Lynching in the United States, 1889-1918. National Association for the Advancement of Colored People. April 1919 – via Google Books.
- Ridley, Alexia (June 26, 2020). "Remembering Victims of 1905 Mass Lynching in Watkinsville". WUGA.
- "Our Monthly Review". The Voice of the Negro. II (8): 529–530. August 1905 – via Google Books.
- Thompson, Adam (November 22, 2007). "Group to look for lost graves from notorious 1905 lynching". Savannah Morning News. Morris Communications.
- "115-year anniversary of Watkinsville mass lynching". WAGA-TV. June 29, 2020.
