= Leader's Academy High School for Business and Academic Success =

Location
- 6011 W. Orem
- Coordinates: 29.628288°N 95.478183°W

Information
- Type: Charter
- School district: Houston Independent School District (Houston ISD)
- Campus: Urban

Leader's Academy High School for Business and Academic Success, previously the High School for Business and Economic Success (HSBES), was a Grade 7–12 state charter school located on the campus of Windsor Village United Methodist Church in Windsor Village, Houston, in the U.S. state of Texas. The school was formerly named Gulf Shores Academy. In 2011 it merged with Benji's Special Educational Academy into Victory Preparatory Academy.

== History ==
Gulf Shores Academy opened in 1998. The Texas Education Agency tried to shut down the charter school for several years. At a point the school owed the state US$11 million for over-reporting attendance. Harris County prosecutors said that the original founders of the academy sold forged transcripts to undercover investigators. The school moved around from location to location and had a high teacher turnover rate. In 2006 its student body count was between 500 and 600. In 2008 the U.S. Department of Justice criminally charged the school's leader, Linda Johnson, along with document tampering due to the school making false academic transcripts, as parents paid her to create transcripts not reflecting actual academic performance. Johnson received a federal prison term of two years.

In the late 2000s the Windsor Village United Methodist Church took over the school. Originally the church planned to use the former charter, but it decided to ask the Houston Independent School District (HISD) to turn the campus into a district charter. The HISD board voted regarding turning Leader's Academy for High School for Business and Academic Success into a district charter. Leader's Academy was established as an HISD-affiliated charter school in 2007. Members of the charter school's board of trustees as of 2009 included Rod Paige, the former Secretary of Education of the U.S., and Kirbyjon Caldwell, the senior pastor of the church. The board became known as the Management Accountability Corp.

In 2011 it merged with Benji's Special Educational Academy into Victory Preparatory Academy after Leader's Academy's board took over Benji's School. Victory Prep was established as a charter school directly overseen by the state instead of as an HISD charter.

== Campus ==
The school was last located in the former sanctuary of the Windsor Village United Methodist Church. It was formerly at 6000 Heatherbrook.

== Dress code ==
The charter school planned to require students to wear "business attire" and carry briefcases to school.

== Notable alumni ==
As Gulf Shores Academy:

- Gerald Green (Basketball player) - Jennifer Radcliffe of the Houston Chronicle wrote that Gulf Shores Academy was best known for the problems in management, but that the fact that Green was an alumnus was the second-most-prominent aspect of the school.

As ????:

- Aubrey Coleman (Basketball player)
- Curtis Dennis (Basketball Player)
- Darington Hobson (Basketball Player)

== See also ==
- List of state-operated charter schools in Houston
