= Five Corners Square (Chernihiv) =

Main square of Chernihiv, Ukraine

- Interactive map of Five Corners Square
- Native name: П’ять кутів (Ukrainian)
- Former name: Five Corners Square
- Type: Square
- Location: Chernihiv, Chernihiv Oblast Ukraine
- Coordinates: 51°30′09″N 31°18′36″E
- From: Routes №6, 7, 9A: Five Corners and Puppet Theater
- Major junctions: Myru Avenue, Pobeda Avenue, Lyubomir Bodnaruk Street, Alexander Molodchy Street, Oleg Mikhnyuk Street

Construction
- Construction start: 18th century

Five Corners (Ukrainian: П’ять кутів) is a square in the Desnianskyi district of Chernihiv, Ukraine at the intersection of Pobeda Avenue, Lyubomir Bodnaruk Street, 1 May Street, Alexander Molodchy Street, and Oleg Mikhnyuk Street. According to the publication "Chernihiv: Encyclopedic Handbook" is the main square of the Desnyansky district: its administrative, commercial and socio-cultural center.

== History ==
The square was founded in the 18th century. Its construction is formed taking into account the preservation of the species perspective on 1 Maya Street (now a separate street of Oleg Mikhnyuk), on the architectural complex Detinets.

There is a puppet theater (Pobeda Avenue No. 135), a trade house (architect Yu. Dmytruk) with a restaurant (Stary Chernihiv) on the ground floor (Pobeda Avenue No. 137), a house of the regional consumer society (Pobeda Avenue No. 139) and the Desnyansky District Committee and the Communist Party Ukraine and the district executive committee (architect A. Sergeev). In the late 1980s, it was planned to extend Pobeda Avenue in the direction of Rokossovsky Street, and in this connection the adjacent section to Alexander Molodchy Street from the east was built up in a block of high-rise residential buildings.

Now the trade house serves as an office building, and the Desnyansky district court of the city of Chernihiv and the Department of Education of the Chernihiv City Council are located in the former house of the district committee and the district executive committee. The rest of the construction of the square is a manor house, adjacent to Pobeda Avenue from the north to Lubomir Bodnaruk, 1 May and Alexander Molodchy streets.

== Transport ==
- trolleybus routes No. 6, 7, 9A - Five Corners and Puppet Theater stops
- bus / march. taxi routes No. 1, 8, 11, 12, 42, 43, 160 - stops Five Corners and Puppet Theater

== See also ==
- List of streets and squares in Chernihiv
- Five Corners
