= Victory Preparatory Academy =

Location
- South (closed summer 2018): 6011 W. Orem; North (closed February 2018): 2903 Jensen Drive

Information
- Type: Charter
- School district: None (2011-2016); Houston Independent School District (2016-2018)
- Campus: Urban
- Website: web.archive.org/*/http://vprep.org

Victory Preparatory Academy or Victory Prep (VPREP) was a charter school in Houston, Texas that had two campuses: one in the city's south, Victory Preparatory Academy South; and a northern campus, Victory Preparatory Academy North. The system all together served grades K-12 and was operated by the nonprofit organization Management Accountability Corp. It closed in 2018.

In 2016 it had about 500 students total. The Northside campus was in the Northside district.

== History ==
Campuses in Houston

It was formed by the 2011 merger of Leader's Academy High School for Business and Academic Success in southern Houston and Benji's Special Educational Academy in northern Houston. It was initially established as a charter school directly overseen by the state; the predecessor institution Leader's Academy was a charter supervised by the Houston Independent School District (HISD).

In 2015 the statewide pass rate for state examinations was 77% but the charter school's passing rate was 66%. In 2016 the Texas Education Agency (TEA) was ordering the school shut down due to academic issues, but the HISD board voted in favor of establishing a partnership with the charter school to keep it in operation on April 14, 2016, with five board members in favor and two against. HISD was to get an oversight role, but not directly manage the school.

In February 2018 the North Campus announced that it was closing immediately since its budget had decreased after Hurricane Harvey; only the south campus remained in operation. The school system announced in April 2018 that it was closing its remaining campus permanently in the summer of 2018.

== See also ==
- List of state-operated charter schools in Houston
