= Five Points, Ohio =

Five Points, Ohio may refer to:

- Five Points, Champaign County, Ohio
- Five Points, Pickaway County, Ohio
- Five Points (Toledo), in Toledo, Ohio
- Five Points, Warren County, Ohio

== See also ==
- Five Points (disambiguation)
