= Benji's Special Educational Academy =

Coordinates: 29.7879°N 95.34250°W

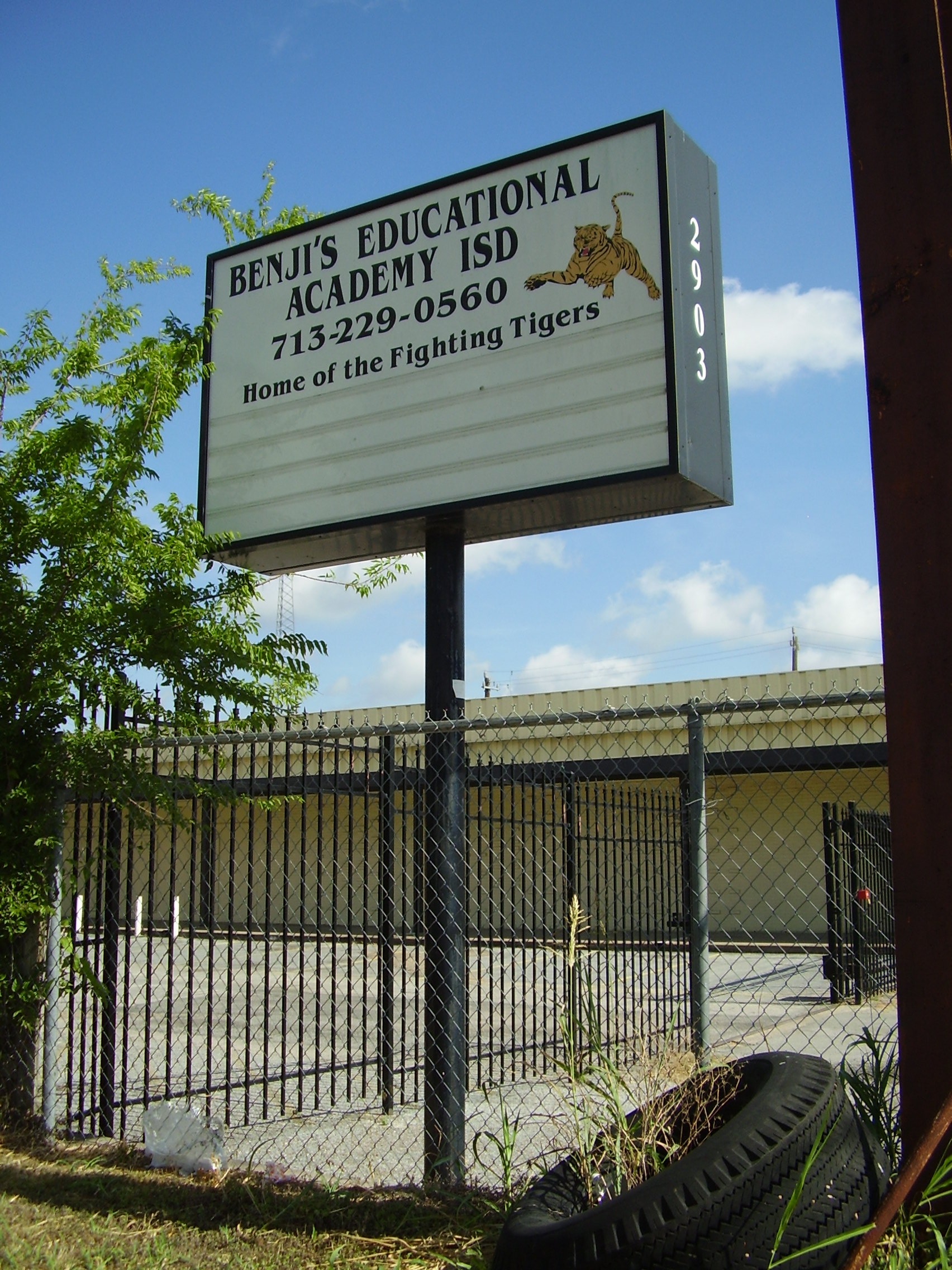
- Campus I

Location
- I: 2903 Jensen Drive, Houston, TX 77026; II: 2834 Jensen Drive, Houston, TX 77026

Information
- Type: Charter
- Campus: Urban
- Website: web.archive.org/*/http://benjisacademy.com

Benji's Special Educational Academy Independent School District (or Benji's Academy Charter School) was a state charter school with two campuses (including Benji's II) in the Northside district of Houston, Texas, near the Fifth Ward. The school covered grades Pre-Kindergarten 4-12. The school initially defied an order to close from the Texas Education Agency (TEA). In 2011 it merged with Leader's Academy High School for Business and Academic Success into Victory Preparatory Academy.

== History ==
Campuses in Houston

The school was founded on May 8, 1981 by Theaola Robinson, who served as the executive director and founder of Benji's Academy. Her son, Benjajuain "Benji" Chandler, was diagnosed with some brain damage at age three. According to Robinson, she became frustrated when she did not find any satisfactory schools that would help her son succeed. Therefore Robinson established the school. In November 1998 the school received a charter from the Texas Education Agency (TEA) to serve grades PreK through 12.

The TEA board, appointed by TEA commissioner Robert Scott, voted to close Benji's on Monday September 13, 2010 because, according to the board, Benji's was almost bankrupt. Robinson defied the state's order to close her school and continued operations in order to serve the community. According to Houston City Council member Jarvis Johnson, 400 of the school's 500 students attended classes on Wednesday September 15, the day that the TEA's order took effect. The school demanded that the TEA release funds that, according to Benji's, were improperly withheld from the school. On Friday September 17 the school's bid for the release of the funds failed.

In 2011 Robinson sued KTRK-TV and its parent company, Disney, for libel.

In 2011 it merged with Leader's Academy High School for Business and Academic Success into Victory Preparatory Academy after Leader's Academy's board, Management Accountability Corp., took over Benji's School.

== School song ==
Joe Willis wrote and arranged the school song. Cedric Taylor performed the school song.

== See also ==
- List of state-operated charter schools in Houston
