= Five Points Historic District =

Five Points Historic District may refer to:

in the United States

(by state)

- Five Points South Historic District, Birmingham, Alabama, listed on the NRHP in Alabama
- Five Points Historic District (Huntsville, Alabama)
- Five Points Historic District (Albemarle, North Carolina), listed on the NRHP in North Carolina
- Five Points Historic Neighborhoods (Raleigh, North Carolina)
- Five Points Historic District (Columbia, South Carolina), NRHP-listed in Columbia
