= City Park, Houston =

Development in Houston, Texas, US

Coordinates: 29.622°N 95.400°W

City Park
- Neighborhood of Houston
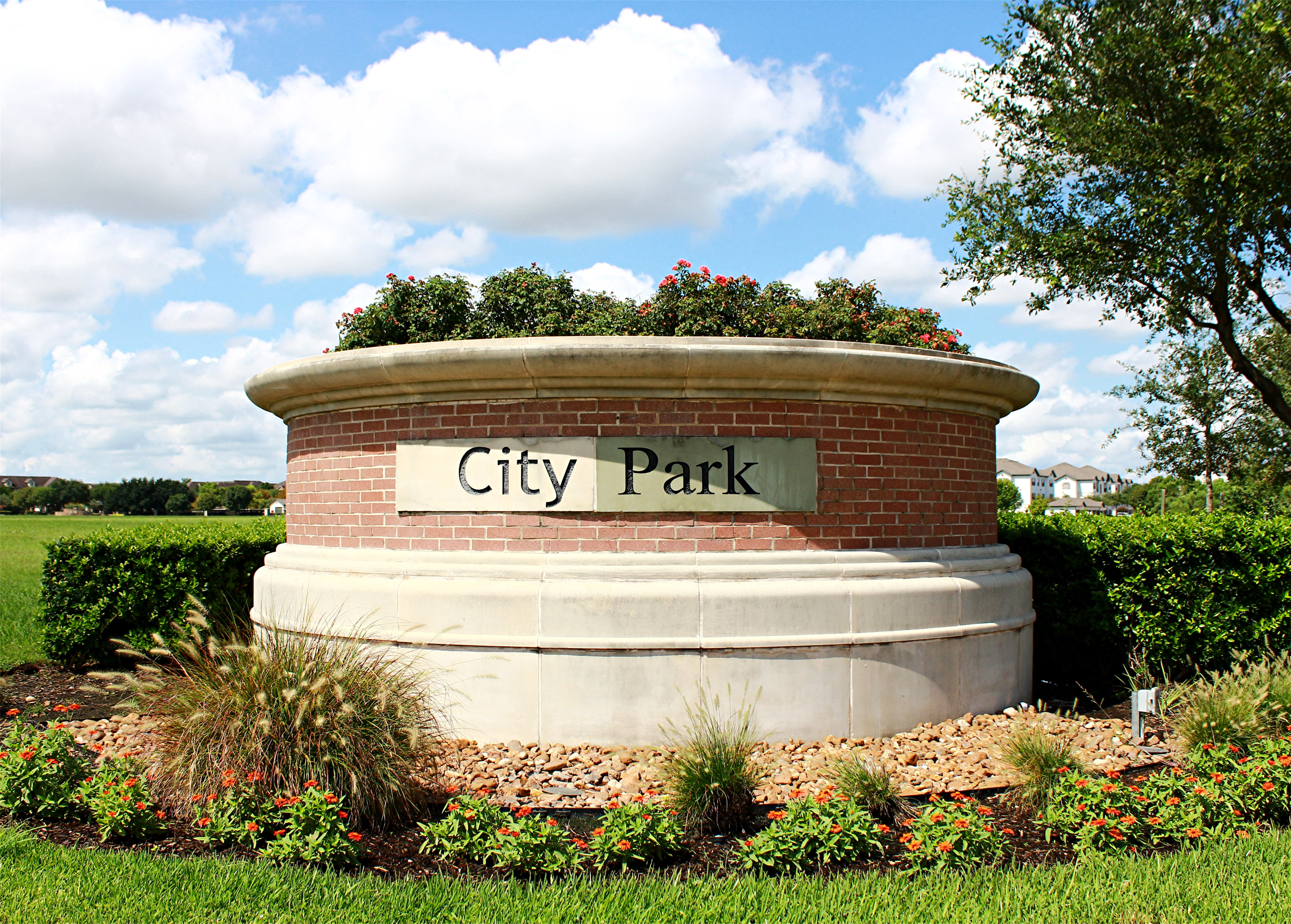
- Interactive map of City Park
- Country: United States
- State: Texas
- County: Harris
- City: Houston
- Founder: GBF/LIC 288, Ltd.
- Time zone: UTC−6 (Central)
  - Summer (DST): UTC−5
- ZIP Codes: 77047
- Area codes: 713/281/832/346

City Park is a master-planned community in Houston, Texas, United States, that encompasses the subdivisions of City Park, City Park West, and City Oaks. It is within the Five Corners District and has 475 acres (192 ha) of space.

The neighborhood, consisting of 1,500 houses, is on a 375 acres (152 ha) tract along Orem Drive, between Texas State Highway 288 and Almeda Road. City Park, located along Sims Bayou, is centered at the intersection of Kirby Drive and West Orem Drive. Jenna Colley of the Houston Business Journal said that the subdivision is one seven-minute drive away from the Texas Medical Center. The development is also slated for a 4.5-acre (18,000 m^{2}) park in addition to its many walking trails and playgrounds.

== History ==
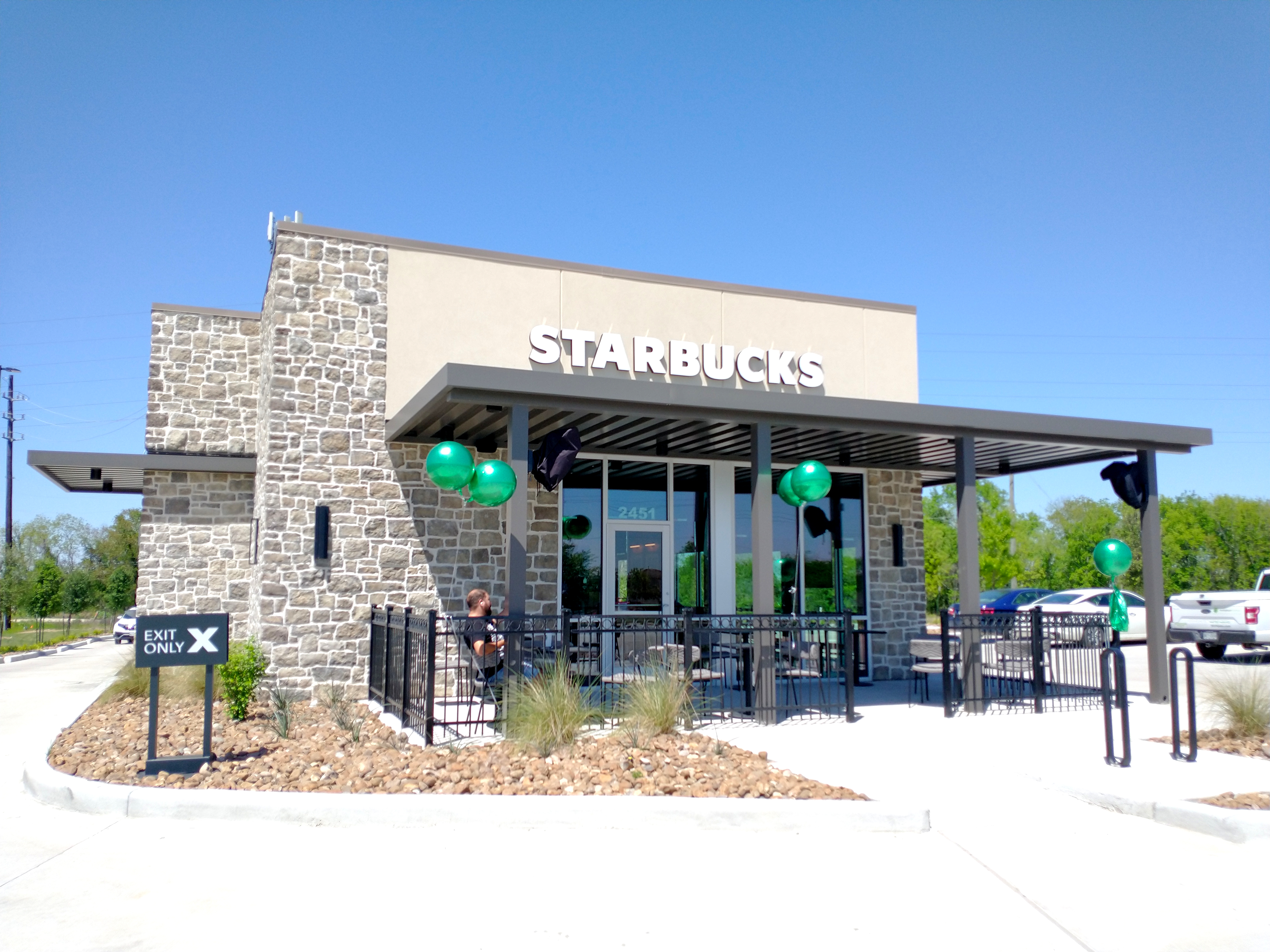
A Starbucks retail store in City Park

In April 2002 Sam Yager Jr., the president of Sam Yager Inc., a land management company, approached City of Houston planners with the proposed City Park project. During that year planners from the City of Houston and Harris County agreed to enter a public-private partnership to facilitate the development of City Park on then-vacant land. At the time Orem Drive did not extend eastward to Texas State Highway 288, nor did it extend westward to Kirby Drive. The city and county agreed to build separate extensions of Orem Drive. Al Haines, the chief administrative officer of the City of Houston in 2002, said that the City Park project caused the city to prioritize the extension of Orem Drive. The Houston City Council agreed to create a municipal utility district (MUD) designed to reimburse the costs of the utility infrastructure construction. Yager said that the City Park project would have been too expensive to implement if the MUD had not been created. The City of Houston participated in the City Park project to provide jobs, lower housing prices, and encourage the development of retail businesses in the surrounding area.

The first subdivision, built on former farmland, was intended to provide living space for people who work in the Texas Medical Center and Downtown Houston. The project had a cost of $250 million. Upon completion the nearly 1,500 houses within City Park were to be priced between $70,000 and $140,000. The project was Yager's firm's first project within the City of Houston limits. Yager's firm managed the project, as Parkside Homes was the home builder. Yager's investors, which did not receive any tax abatements included GBF/LIC 288 Ltd and Lumbermen's Investment Corp. The City of Houston expected $1.5 million in revenues within seven to eight years of the development of City Park. Haines said that market forces would determine whether City Park is financially successful. In 2005 the price range of houses in City Park was between $90,000 ($148364.29 in current money) and $140,000 ($230788.89 in current money). During that year Business Week said that in City Park "sales are strong, even though the lots and homes are much smaller than those for comparable money in the exurbs, and they are in the Houston Independent School District, which some young families want to avoid." After the developers of City Park had announced their plans, other developers wishing to create subdivisions in southern Houston began including the creation of MUDs in their plans.

== Government and infrastructure ==
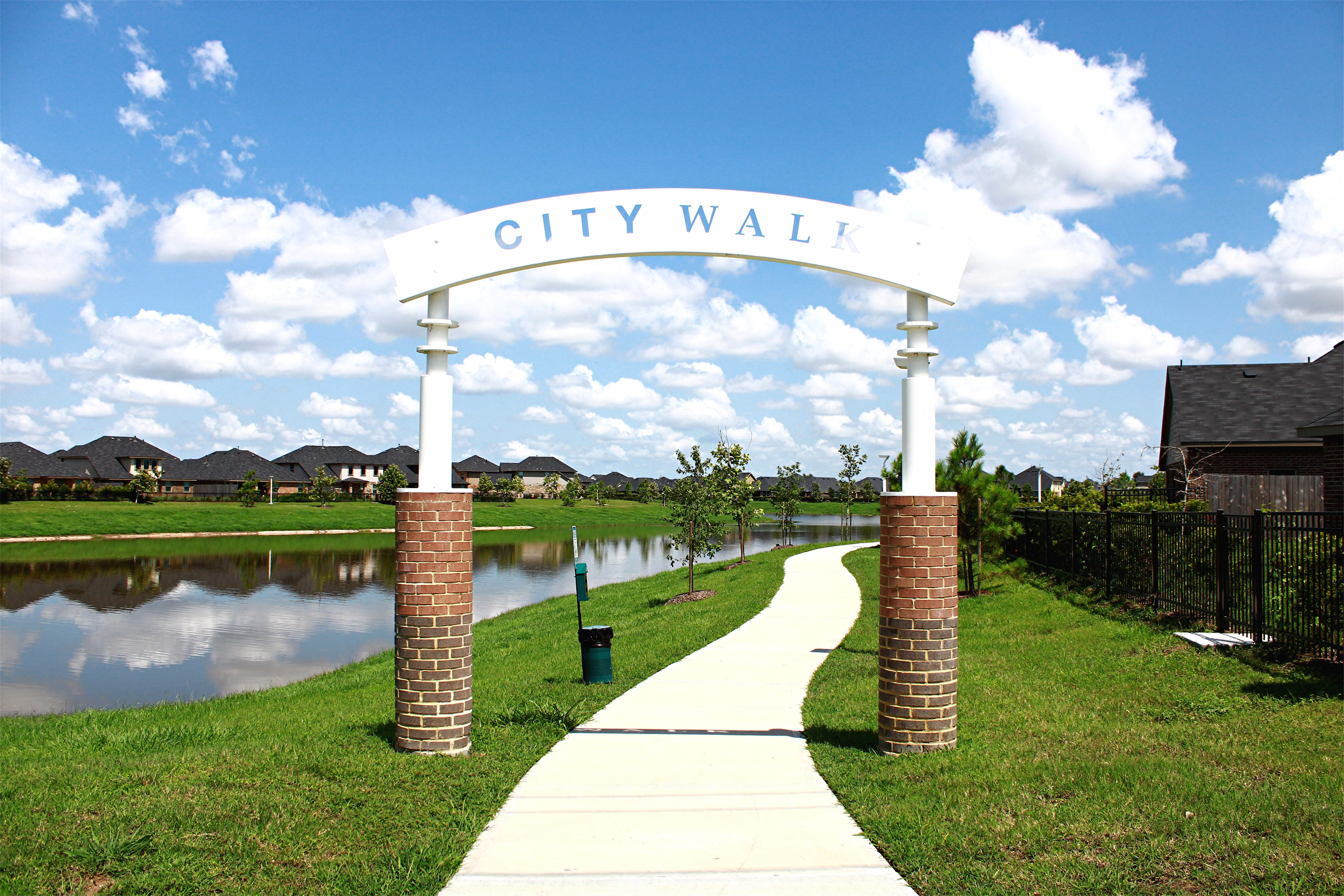
City Walk

City Park is in Houston City Council District D.

== Education ==
Residents are zoned to schools in the Houston Independent School District. The community is within Trustee District IX, represented by Lawrence Marshall as of 2008.

As of 2018 zoned schools for almost all of the development are Almeda Elementary School in Almeda, Lawson Middle School (formerly Dick Dowling Middle School) in Hiram Clarke, and Worthing High School in Sunnyside. Landmark at City Park Apartments, a part of the City Park development, is zoned to Reynolds Elementary School, Crispus Attucks Middle School in Sunnyside, and Worthing High School.

Prior to the northern hemisphere fall of 2011 the development was zoned to Woodson K-8 School for Grades 6-8. Prior to the northern hemisphere fall of 2012, City Park was zoned to Reynolds Elementary School for grades K-5. After the fall of 2011 and before the fall of 2012, City Park was zoned to Attucks Middle School.

The City Park website advertised its proximity to other HISD schools, including:

- Codwell Elementary School
- Frost Elementary School
- Law Elementary School
- Thomas Middle School
- Sterling High School

The developer plans include a site for a future Houston ISD school.
