= Five Points, Indiana =

Five Points, Indiana may refer to:

- Five Points, Allen County, Indiana
- Five Points neighborhood in Indianapolis, Marion County, Indiana
- Five Points, Morgan County, Indiana
- Five Points, Warren County, Indiana
- Five Points, Wells County, Indiana
- Five Points, Whitley County, Indiana
