= WUGA (FM) =

- Athens, Georgia; United States
- Broadcast area: Northeast Georgia (Atlanta market)
- Frequency: 91.7 MHz
- Branding: WUGA 91.7 and 94.5 FM

Programming
- Format: Public radio (news, talk, classical music and jazz)

Ownership
- Owner: Georgia Public Broadcasting; (Georgia Public Telecommunications Commission)
- Operator: University of Georgia

History
- First air date: August 28, 1987
- Call sign meaning: University of Georgia

Technical information
- Licensing authority: FCC
- Facility ID: 22982
- Class: A
- ERP: 6,000 watts
- HAAT: 100 meters (330 ft)
- Transmitter coordinates: 33°55′13.4″N 83°14′45.6″W
- Translator: 94.5 W233CA (Athens)

Links
- Public license information: Public file; LMS
- Webcast: Listen live
- Website: www.wuga.org

WUGA (91.7 MHz) is a public FM radio station serving Athens and much of the northeast part of Georgia. It is owned as a member of Georgia Public Broadcasting's radio network but is operated by the University of Georgia, with studios and offices located at the Georgia Center for Continuing Education & Hotel on the UGA campus on South Lumpkin Street between the Five Points neighborhood and downtown Athens. The transmitter is located off Walter Sams Road in Winterville, Georgia, southeast of Athens.

The station's programming consists of news and public affairs, classical music, jazz and folk music from GPB Radio, as well as locally-produced content.

On March 1, 2010, UGA announced budget cuts that, if approved, would have resulted in the end of locally-produced programming on the station. It would then have become a full-time relay of the GPB network. However, as of January 20, 2011, WUGA remains operated by UGA, and during the early 2010s its operations were consolidated with WUGA-TV, a television station UGA owned at the time.

== Translators ==
Since 1993, the station has operated a low-powered FM translator - originally W250AC at 97.9. It moved to 94.5 as W233CA on March 23, 2017. This "fill-in" transmitter was added to improve reception in the downtown Athens area, which can be poor due to terrain shielding and the main transmitter's relatively modest power (6,000 watts). The University of Georgia also owns a student-operated college radio station, WUOG (90.5), which broadcasts and transmits from another location on campus. The two stations' operations are entirely separate from each other.

There are two other supposed translators that are listed in the FCC database as relays of the station. However, these are licensed to Radio Assist Ministry, a religious organization not associated with GPB or UGA. They are not listed by GPB, or given a station ID on the air, making them highly questionable.

There was a third such translator, W300BF 107.9 MHz in Commerce, Georgia, which, under RAM, repeated WUGA. That repeater was sold to Athens Christian Radio, Inc. in 2007. FCC records show it switched its programming source to WMJE in Clarkesville.
