= Five Corners Square (Warsaw) =

Urban square in Warsaw, Poland

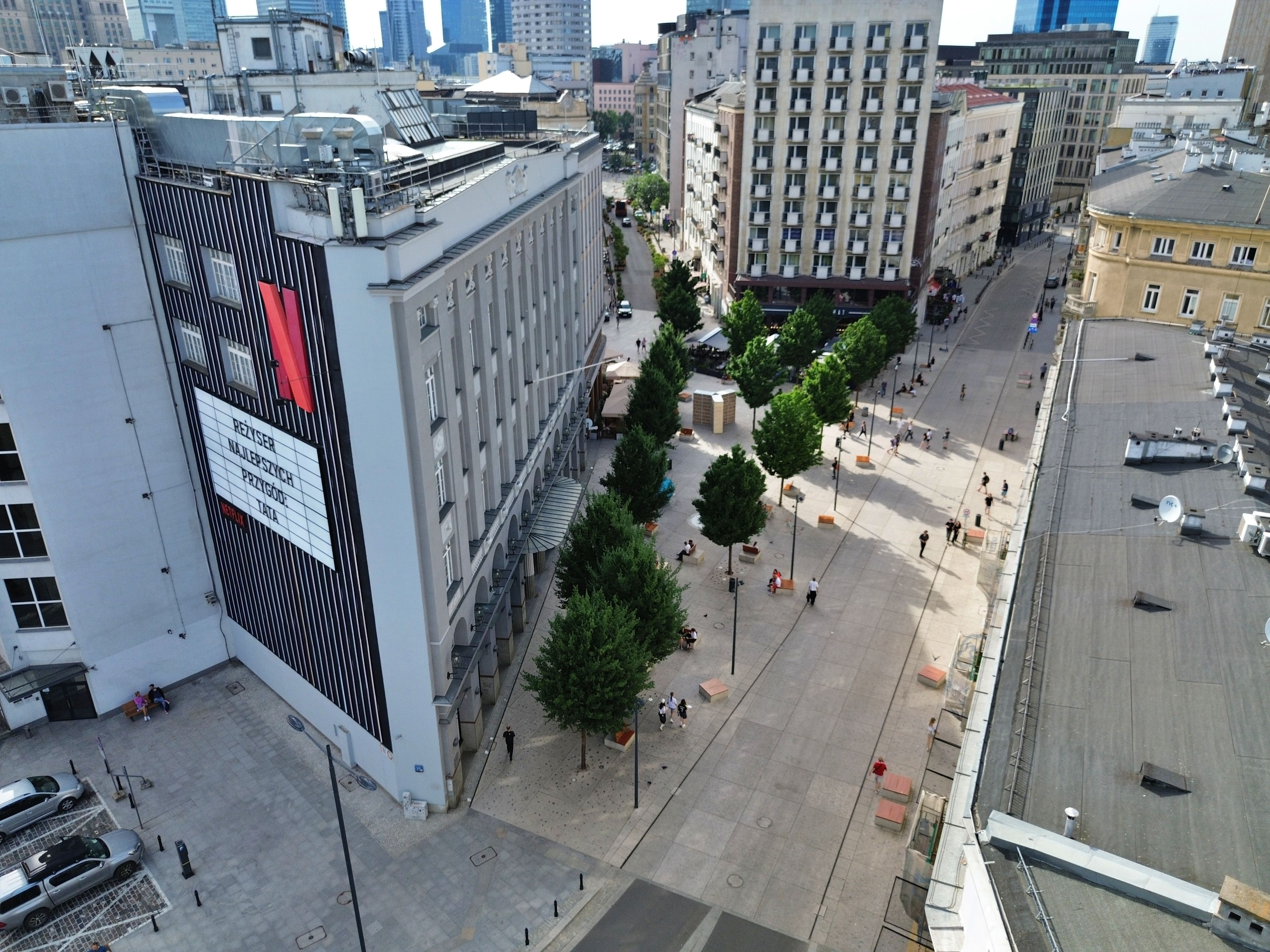
- Five Corners Square in 2024

- Location within Warsaw
- Type: Urban square
- Location: Downtown, Warsaw, Poland
- Coordinates: 52°13′56.6″N 21°00′55.5″E
- North: Szpitalna Street; Zgoda Street
- East: Chmielna Street
- South: Bracka Street; Krucza Street
- West: Chmielna Street

Construction
- Completion: 5 July 2022

Five Corners Square (Polish: Plac Pięciu Rogów) is an urban square in Warsaw, Poland, within the Downtown district. It is located at the intersection of Bracka, Chmielna, Krucza, Szpitalna, and Zgoda Streets. The square was refurbished in 2022.

== Name ==
Traditionally, the square is known as Five Corners Square (Polish: Plac Pięciu Rogów). The name refers to its shape, formed by surrounding tenements. Such name is, among others, used by the official city website.

The square does not have an official name. On 25 August 2022, the Warsaw City Council passed a resolution to name it after Pola Negri, a 20th-century film and stage actress and singer. However, on 28 September 2022, the voivode of the Masovian Voivodeship ruled it to be void, and as such, the name never became official. Such decision was made because there was already a street named after Negri in the city, and local laws forbid name repetition. The council had unsuccessfully contested it, filing its case to the Voivodeship Administrative Court on 13 October 2022.

== History ==
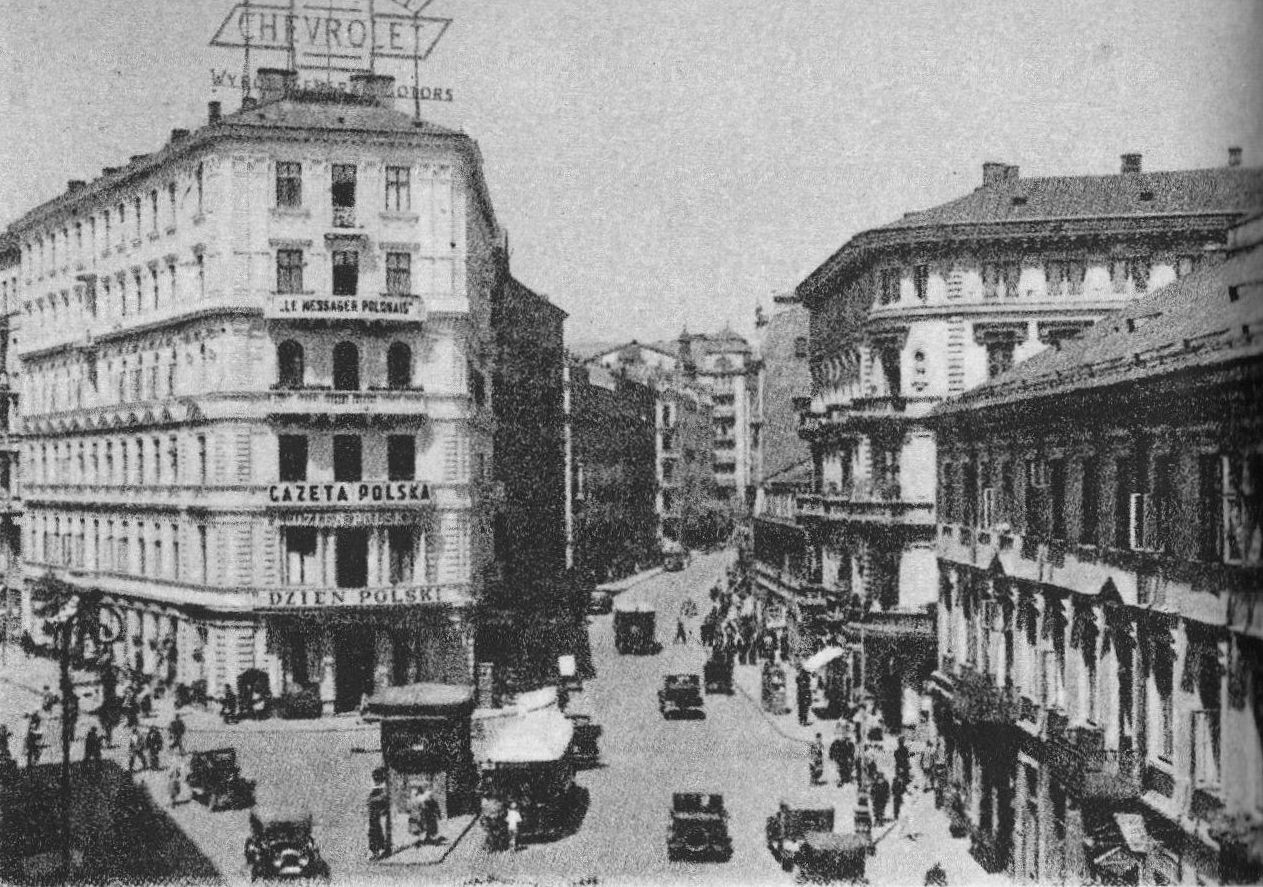
The intersection of Szpitalna and Zgoda Streets in the 1930s

The intersection of Bracka, Chmielna, Krucza, Szpitalna, and Zgoda Streets, that makes the modern square, was formed in the 18th century.

Between 1776 and 1782, at the corner of Bracka and Chmielna Streets, there was a wooden circus and animal-fighting arena building, known as Heca or Szczwalnia.

In the 19th century, tenements were developed around the square.

On 17 November 1913, at 25 Bracka Street, the Jabłkowski Brothers Department Store was opened, the first, and for a long time, the largest department store in Poland. It was owned by the Jabłkowski Brothers, until 1950, when it was nationalised. The building was returned to the Jabłkowski family in 1996.

In September 2011, the New Jabłkowski Building, designed as an office space, was opened next to it. During its construction, it was also proposed to redevelop the area from a traffic congested intersection into a pedestrian urban square.

In 2016, the city began searching for an architectural concept for the square, and hired a developer in 2020. The construction lasted from March 2021 to July 2022, and it was officially opened on 5 July. The nearby streets were also renovated.

== Characteristics ==
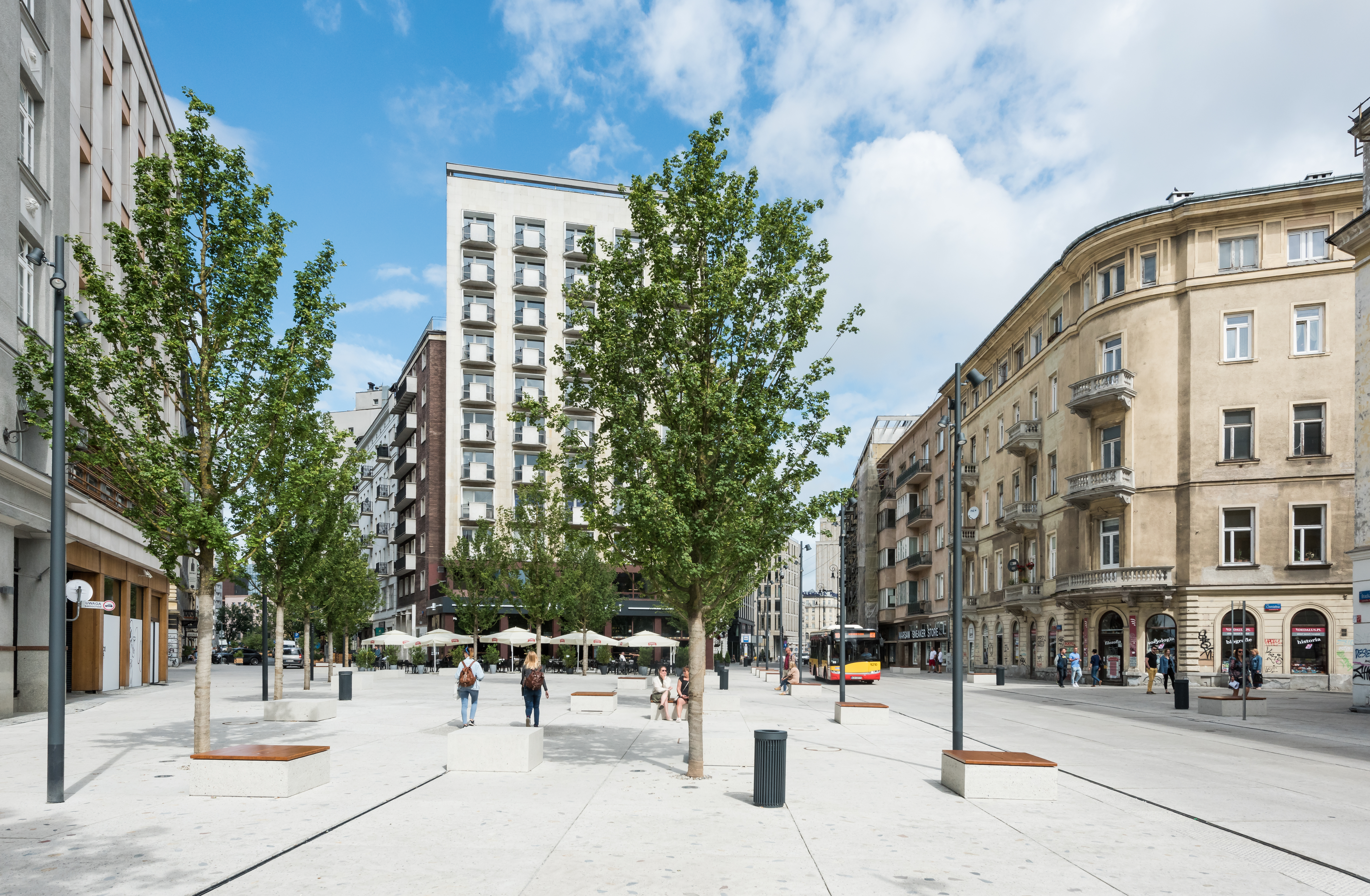
Five Corners Square in 2022

Five Corners Square is located at the intersection of Bracka, Chmielna, Krucza, Szpitalna, and Zgoda Streets, in the Downtown district, within the neighbourhood of North Downtown.

The square is designed to prioritize pedestrians over cars. During its redevelopment, the roads were removed and car traffic heavily limited, and is now only accessible to local businesses and inhabitants. The exception is the intersection of Krucza and Szpitalna Streets, which functions as a bus-only lane and a bicycle path. The square is covered with large concrete panels, with spaces for businesses and restaurants, as well as numerous benches and lightposts. Twenty-two field maples were also planted. It is surrounded mostly by historical 19th-century tenements, as well as the historical Jabłkowski Brothers Department Store built in 1914, and the neighbouring New Jabłkowski Building from 2011.

At the square, there is also the sculpture Chick. Thrush the Singer (Polish: Pisklę. Drozd śpiewak) by Joanna Rajkowska, unveiled on 15 May 2023. It is shaped like a 2-metre tall egg that emits light sounds and vibrations, which can be heard and felt after hugging it. They take the form of sounds of a small trush chick, including its hearbeat, it hitting the shell with its beak, and its first chirps.

== Gallery ==
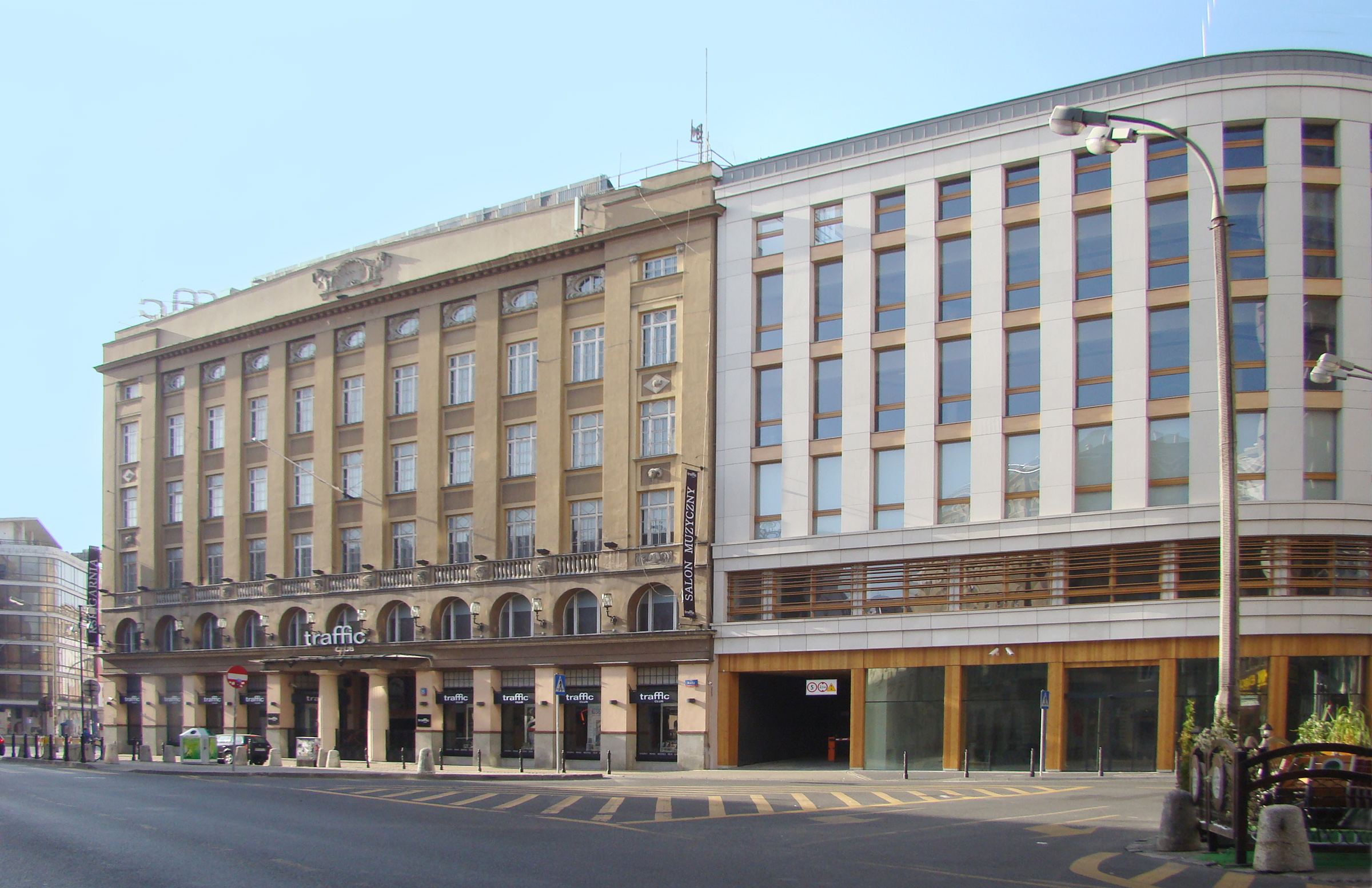
Jabłkowski Brothers Department Store (1914) and New Jabłkowski Building (2011)

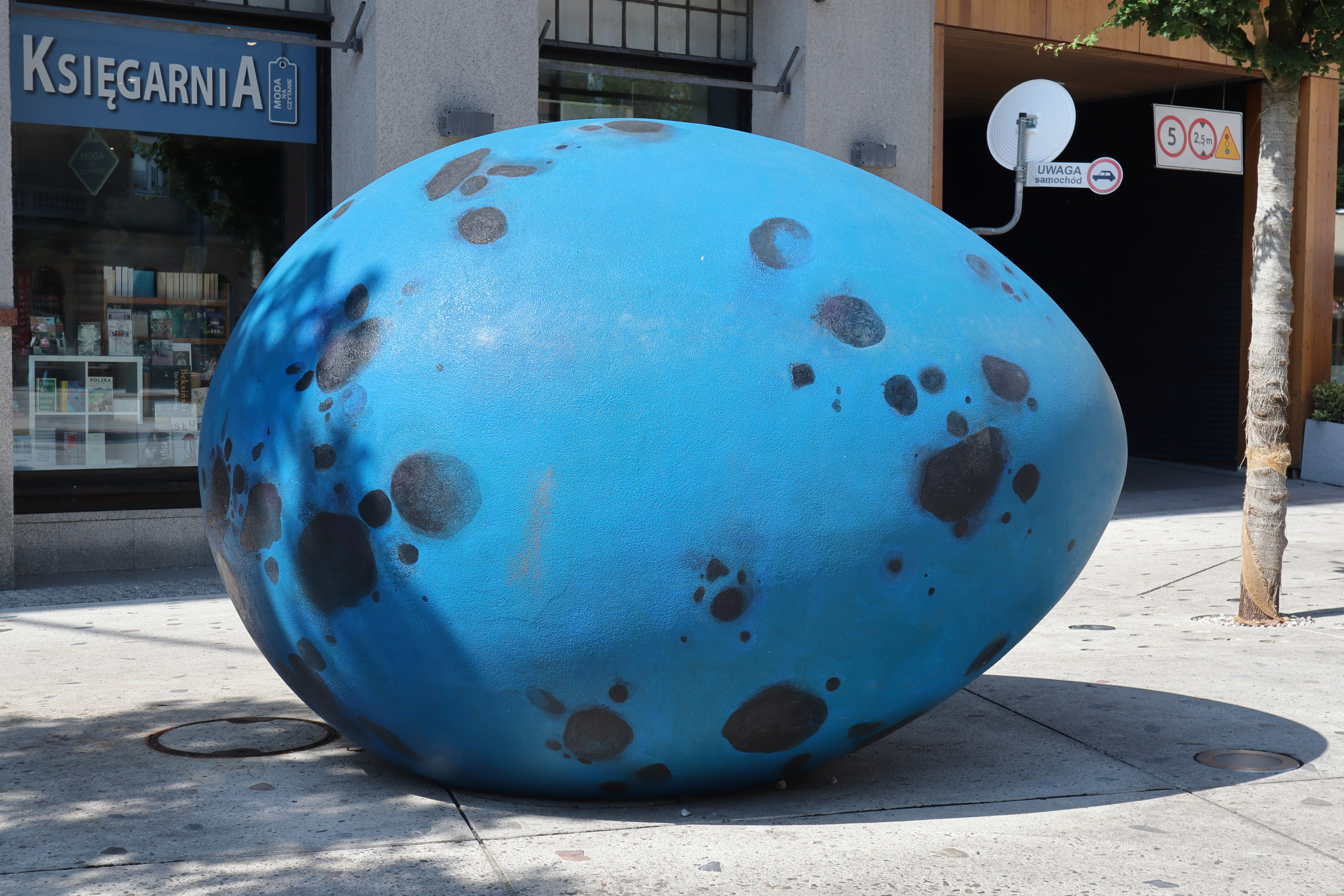
Sculpture Chick. Thrush the Singer by Joanna Rajkowska
