= Five Point Plan =

Five Point Plan was a San Francisco based band with a mixed music style of funk, acid jazz, hip hop, and soul. They released their debut album "Five Point Plan" in 1999 which was followed by "Rare" in 2002. UK indie label Café de Soul included tracks from the band on their compilation album, "Rare" was released by Japanese label P-Vine Records.

Vocalist Latrice Barnett made the first step in her solo career by releasing the album Illuminate in 2006 and touring with the band Galactic in 2008.

In 2015, Barnett and keyboardist Jordan Glasgow launched a new Motown/Nashville-inspired soul project, entitled Loveseat Congregation. The group released an EP ""Real Talk"' in 2016.

== Discography ==
- Five Point Plan (1999)
- Rare (2002)

== Band members ==
- Latrice Barnett - vocal
- Tim Carter - drums
- Michael Cruz - bass
- Jordan Glasgow - keyboards
- David Metzner - guitar
