= Five Points, West Virginia =

Unincorporated community in West Virginia, United States

Five Points
- Unincorporated community
- Location within the state of West Virginia Five Points (the United States)
- Coordinates: 39°40′55″N 80°43′25″W
- Country: United States
- State: West Virginia
- County: Wetzel
- Elevation: 1,348 ft (411 m)
- Time zone: UTC-5 (Eastern (EST))
  - Summer (DST): UTC-4 (EDT)
- GNIS ID: 1717591

Five Points was an unincorporated community in Wetzel County, West Virginia.
