= Kirbyjon Caldwell =

American pastor and author

- Born: Kirbyjon H. Caldwell; August 11, 1953 (age 72); Lynchburg, Virginia, U.S. [citation needed]
- Occupations: Pastor; televangelist; political activist
- Political party: Democratic

Religious life
- Religion: Christianity (Methodist)

Kirbyjon H. Caldwell is the former senior pastor of Windsor Village United Methodist Church, a 14,000-member megachurch at Windsor Village in Houston, Texas. He was a spiritual advisor to Presidents George W. Bush and Barack Obama.

On March 17, 2020, Caldwell pleaded guilty to federal wire fraud charges in a $3.5 million bond scheme and was sentenced to six years in federal prison.

== Early life ==
Caldwell was born in 1953 in Houston. His father was a tailor who made suits for James Brown, The Temptations and other celebrities. His mother was a high-school guidance counselor. His family lived in the Kashmere Gardens neighborhood of Houston, and Caldwell graduated from Kashmere High School.

He attended Carleton College, receiving a B.A. in economics in 1975. Caldwell then attended the Wharton School of Business, receiving an M.B.A. degree in 1977. He worked briefly as an investment banker at First Boston in New York City before returning to Houston for a job at the bond firm of Hibbard, O'Conner and Weeks.

Caldwell felt called to Christian ministry, attending the Perkins School of Theology at Southern Methodist University and receiving a master's in divinity in 1981. While working on his degree, Caldwell was appointed associate pastor at St. Mary's United Methodist Church in Houston. He had been a member of the Continental Airlines board of directors since May 1999.

== Pastorate ==
A major theme in Caldwell's preaching has been the need for his congregation to follow Jesus Christ's example with active involvement in community service. He retooled the Windsor Village United Methodist Church into a community help center. Nonprofit organizations begun by the church include Patrice House, a shelter for abused children; a tutoring program for schoolchildren, and a program matching teenagers with mentors.

To accommodate the congregation, in 1993 the church purchased a former Kmart in an impoverished area of Houston and renovated it as the Power Center (for the retailing term "power center"). In addition to worship space, the Power Center includes a school, a medical clinic, satellite classrooms for a local community college, low-cost office space, a branch of the Chase Bank (there were previously no banks in the neighborhood), a WIC nutrition program and an AIDS outreach center. The Power Center's mission is to create jobs in the low-income neighborhood and teach members of the neighborhood to create wealth. Its motto is Isaiah 61.4: "They shall repair the ruined cities and restore what has long lain desolate".

== The Gospel of Good Success ==
In 1996 the Wall Street Journal ran a front-page story on Caldwell, which prompted Simon & Schuster to approach him about a book. The 1999 book, co-authored with Mark Seal, was The Gospel of Good Success: A Road Map to Spiritual, Emotional, and Financial Wholeness and describes Caldwell's theories on economic empowerment and success.

== Relationship with George W. Bush ==
In 1996 George W. Bush, then governor of Texas, saw an article on Caldwell in the Dallas Morning News and contacted him. Bush spoke at the 1996 opening of the Power Center, and they agreed that a partnership between religious organizations and government could have positive social results. Although Caldwell is a political independent, in 2000 Bush asked Caldwell to introduce him at the 2000 Republican National Convention.

Caldwell offered the benediction at Bush's 2001 inauguration. His prayer triggered controversy; Caldwell prayed in "the name that's above all other names, Jesus the Christ. Let all who agree say amen". Alan Dershowitz wrote, "The plain message conveyed by the new administration is that George W. Bush's America is a Christian nation, and that non-Christians are welcome into the tent so long as they agree to accept their status as a tolerated minority rather than as full equal citizens". Caldwell denies proselytizing, saying that he always prayed in the name of Jesus.

Days after the September 11 attacks in 2001, Caldwell was invited by President Bush to speak at the memorial at the Washington National Cathedral. Later that day, Caldwell joined Bush on his visit to the World Trade Center site. Bush wrote in Decision Points, "it was comforting to have a friend and a man of faith by my side". In 2003, Bush visited the Power Center for its tenth anniversary. Caldwell again offered the benediction at Bush's second inauguration; this time he prayed, "respective of all faiths, I submit this prayer in the name of Jesus." On May 10, 2008, Caldwell officiated at the wedding of Jenna Bush and Henry Hager in Crawford, Texas. Caldwell's work at the Power Center was an inspiration for Bush's "faith based initiatives", and Caldwell was influential in the creation of the White House Office of Faith-Based and Community Initiatives.

== Relationship with Barack Obama ==
Caldwell endorsed Barack Obama in the 2008 Democratic primary, supporting him against John McCain in the presidential election. In August 2010, after media reports that 18 percent of Americans thought President Obama was a Muslim, Caldwell told reporters he had known Obama for years as a Christian who prays daily. He described the media questioning Obama's religion as "a 24-hour noise box committed to presenting the president in a false light".

== Second book and recent work ==
Caldwell published his second book, Entrepreneurial Faith: Launching Bold Initiatives to Expand God's Kingdom, in 2004. In the wake of Hurricane Katrina, Houston was home to thousands of displaced residents from New Orleans, Louisiana. Caldwell organized a food drive, Operation Compassion, with other churches in the Houston area to feed and pray for those living in the George R. Brown Convention Center and the Astrodome.

== Corinthian Pointe ==
Caldwell, the Pyramid Residential Community Corporation and Ryland Homes built a Houston subdivision named Corinthian Pointe during the first decade of the 21st century. Located outside the 610 Loop and inside Beltway 8 near Reliant Park, it is the largest residential subdivision in Houston developed by a non-profit group. Many houses in the subdivision were sold at below-market prices. Jean Hines-Caldwell Elementary School (the public elementary school in Corinthian Pointe) was named for Jean LaNell Hines-Caldwell, Caldwell's mother.

== Fraud charges ==
In March 2018, Caldwell and financial planner Gregory Allen Smith were accused by federal prosecutors of defrauding investors of $3.4 million through worthless bonds. According to the 13-count indictment, Caldwell and Smith made millions selling historical Chinese pre-Communist government bonds as if they were valuable investment instruments. The bonds are worthless for that purpose, because China's Communist government repudiated them. They have historical value only, as collector's items. Instead of investing the funds, the two men allegedly used the money for personal loans, credit card balances, mortgages, and vehicles. The men each face up to 20 years in prison on wire fraud counts and 10 years on money laundering counts.

On March 17, 2020, Caldwell pleaded guilty to fraud charges and was sentenced to six years in federal prison. Pastor Caldwell was released Sept 6, 2024 after serving over 3 years of his sentence. According to a statement from the church, "The court found that Caldwell made full restitution to all of the victims. Notable, restitution began prior to indictment and was completed before sentencing. Many victims were paid over and above the amount that they invested. Voluntary restitution is virtually unheard of and extremely rare in these kinds of cases."

== Personal life ==
Caldwell's first wife was Patrice Johnson, chief of staff for Texas congressman Mickey Leland, who died with Leland in a 1989 plane crash in Ethiopia. Patrice House is named for her.

His second wife is Suzette Turner, older sister of Miss America 1990 Debbye Turner. They have three children: Turner, Nia and Alexander. Pastor Suzette T. Caldwell chairs the Kingdom Builders' Prayer Institute.

== See also ==
- The Imani School
- History of the African-Americans in Houston
- Christianity in Houston
