= Five Points, Wisconsin =

Five Points, Wisconsin may refer to places in the U.S. state of Wisconsin:

- Five Points, Dane County, Wisconsin, an unincorporated community
- Five Points, Grant County, Wisconsin, an unincorporated community
- Five Points, Richland County, Wisconsin, an unincorporated community
