= Vaught House (Huntsville, Alabama) =

Historic residence in Huntsville, Alabama, United States

- U.S. National Register of Historic Places
- U.S. Historic district – Contributing property
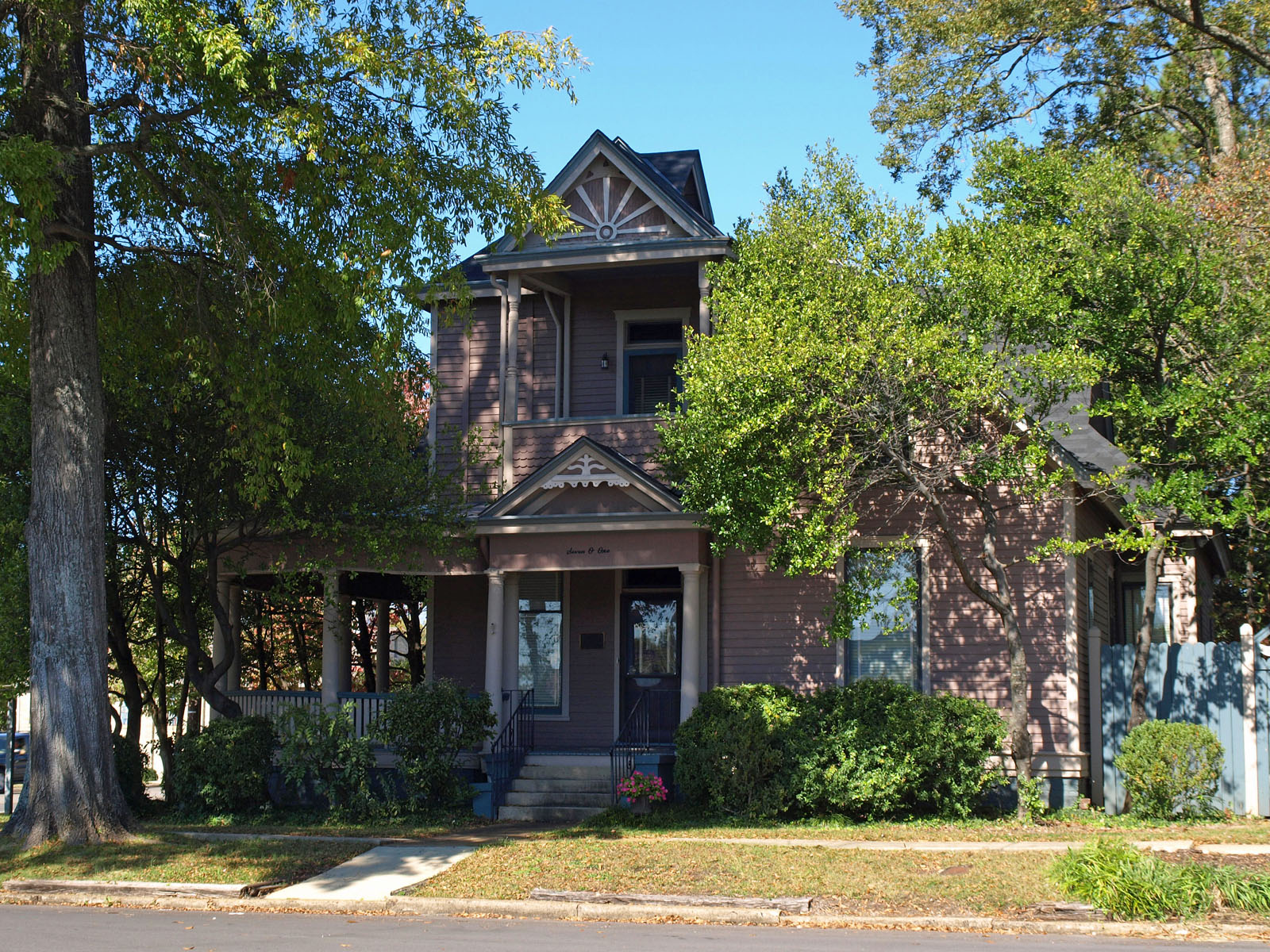
- The house in October 2011

- Location within Huntsville, Alabama Location within Alabama Location within the United States
- Location: 701 Ward Ave., Huntsville, Alabama
- Coordinates: 34°44′24″N 86°34′36″W
- Area: less than one acre
- Built: 1900
- Architectural style: Late Victorian, Stick/Eastlake
- Part of: Five Points Historic District (ID12000522)
- NRHP reference No.: 81000130

Significant dates
- Added to NRHP: December 15, 1981
- Designated CP: August 20, 2012

The Vaught House (also known as the Nicholson House) is a historic residence in Huntsville, Alabama. It was built in 1900 in what was then the East Huntsville Addition, a suburb made up primarily of company houses for nearby cotton mills. Its Victorian architecture style set it apart from its more modest bungalow neighbors. The house has an irregular plan, and its hipped roof features several dormers and gables. Centered on the façade is a single-story pedimented portico leading to the main entrance, and above it is a small pedimented balcony accessed from the upstairs bedroom. Both pediments are decorated with jigsawed designs. Both doors on the front feature rectangular transoms. A curved porch runs from the main portico around the southwest corner of the house; it originally featured Stick-Eastlake style frieze and balustrade, but was later replaced with a solid frieze and closely spaced rectangular balusters. The house was listed on the National Register of Historic Places in 1981. It is included in the Five Points Historic District, which was listed on the National Register in 2012.
