= Five Points, Pennsylvania =

Five Points is the name of many places in the U.S. state of Pennsylvania:

- Five Points, Adams County, Pennsylvania
- Five Points, Beaver County, Pennsylvania
- Five Points, Berks County, Pennsylvania
- Five Points, Bucks County, Pennsylvania, an area in Levittown, Pennsylvania
- Five Points, Butler County, Pennsylvania
- Five Points, Chester County, Pennsylvania
- Five Points, Clarion County, Pennsylvania
- Five Points, Clearfield County, Pennsylvania
- Five Points, Columbia County, Pennsylvania
- Five Points, Elk County, Pennsylvania
- Five Points, Erie County, Pennsylvania
- Five Points, Indiana County, Pennsylvania
- Five Points, Luzerne County, Pennsylvania
- Five Points, Mercer County, Pennsylvania
- Five Points, Montgomery County, Pennsylvania
- Five Points, Northampton County, Pennsylvania
- Five Points, Northumberland County, Pennsylvania
- Five Points, Potter County, Pennsylvania
- Five Points, Venango County, Pennsylvania
- Five Points, Westmoreland County, Pennsylvania
