= Five Corners, Wisconsin =

Five Corners is the name of some places in the U.S. state of Wisconsin:

- Five Corners, Lafayette County, Wisconsin, an unincorporated community
- Five Corners, Outagamie County, Wisconsin, an unincorporated community
- Five Corners, Shawano County, Wisconsin, an unincorporated community
