= Five Points, Michigan =

Five Points, Michigan may refer to:

- Five Points, Oakland County, Michigan, Oakland County, Michigan
- Five Points, Shiawassee County, Michigan
