= Five Corners Historic District =

Historic district in Massachusetts, United States

- U.S. National Register of Historic Places
- U.S. Historic district
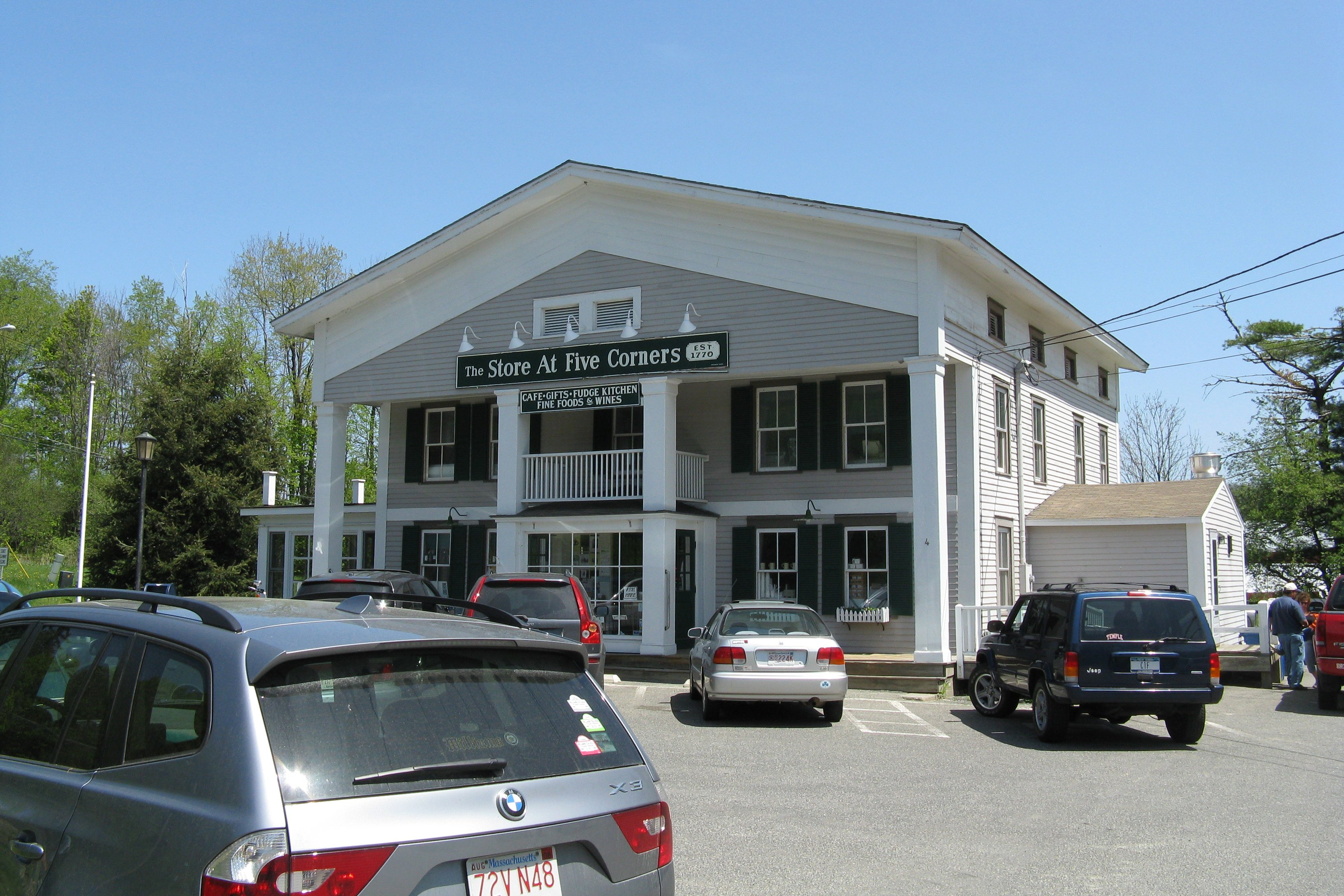
- The Store at Five Corners

- Location within Massachusetts Location within the United States
- Location: Williamstown, Massachusetts
- Coordinates: 42°39′35″N 73°14′33″W
- Area: 58 acres (23 ha)
- Architect: Unknown
- Architectural style: Greek Revival, Other, Federal
- NRHP reference No.: 92001717
- Added to NRHP: January 7, 1993

The Five Corners Historic District is a historic district encompassing the central district of the village of South Williamstown, Massachusetts. It is centered at the junction of Cold Spring, Green River, New Ashford. The junction has been a prominent center in the area since 1760. Prominent buildings in the district include the South Center School, the Store at Five Corners, and the Second Congregational Church. The district was listed on the National Register of Historic Places in 1993.

== Description and history ==
Williamstown was laid out as a township in 1739 and incorporated in 1765. Its early development was centered in the modern town center to the north, and the southern part of the town was not laid out until 1765. South Williamstown, now Five Corners, was formed out of the junction of four large parcels of land, and developed in the late 18th century as a stop on the main north-south stagecoach route (today United States Route 7). By the turn of the 19th century the village had a tavern, store, and cemetery, and the first church was built in 1808. The area remained agricultural through the 19th-century, having been bypassed by railroad construction and significant industrial activity.

The district consists of about 58 acres (23 ha) of land, centered on the junction of Route 7, Massachusetts Route 43, and Sloan Road, a local road serving the area west of the village. The area's slow pace of development and relative isolation has resulted in the accumulation of an architecturally diverse set of buildings, most of which are residential. Many of them are vernacular interpretations of popular 19th-century styles, with versions of the Federal and Greek Revival periods predominant. Significant non-residential buildings include the Second Congregational Church, a Gothic Revival structure built in 1875, the Sloan Tavern, built c. 1770 and later restyled in the Greek Revival, and the 1868 South Center School.

== See also ==
- National Register of Historic Places listings in Berkshire County, Massachusetts
