= Five Points, Asheville =

Neighborhood in Asheville, North Carolina, U.S.

Five Points
- Neighborhood in Asheville, North Carolina
- Interactive map of Five Points
- Coordinates: 35.6033°N 82.5574°W
- State: North Carolina
- County: Buncombe County
- City: Asheville

Five Points is a neighborhood in Asheville, North Carolina, United States. A northern suburb of Asheville, it is named for the five corners formed by the convergence of Broadway Street, Chestnut Street and Mount Clare Avenue.

Many of the homes in Five Points were built in the 1920s and 1930s.

Asheville businessman and benefactor George W. Pack built his "Many Oaks" estate where the Harris Teeter grocery store stands today at the intersection of Chestnut Street and Merrimon Avenue (U.S. Route 25).

A streetcar used to run along Broadway Street to Mount Clare Avenue, before terminating at Hillside Street.

Five Points Restaurant, at 258 Broadway Street, has been in business since 1972.
