= Five Points Historic District (Huntsville, Alabama) =

Historic district in Alabama, United States

- U.S. National Register of Historic Places
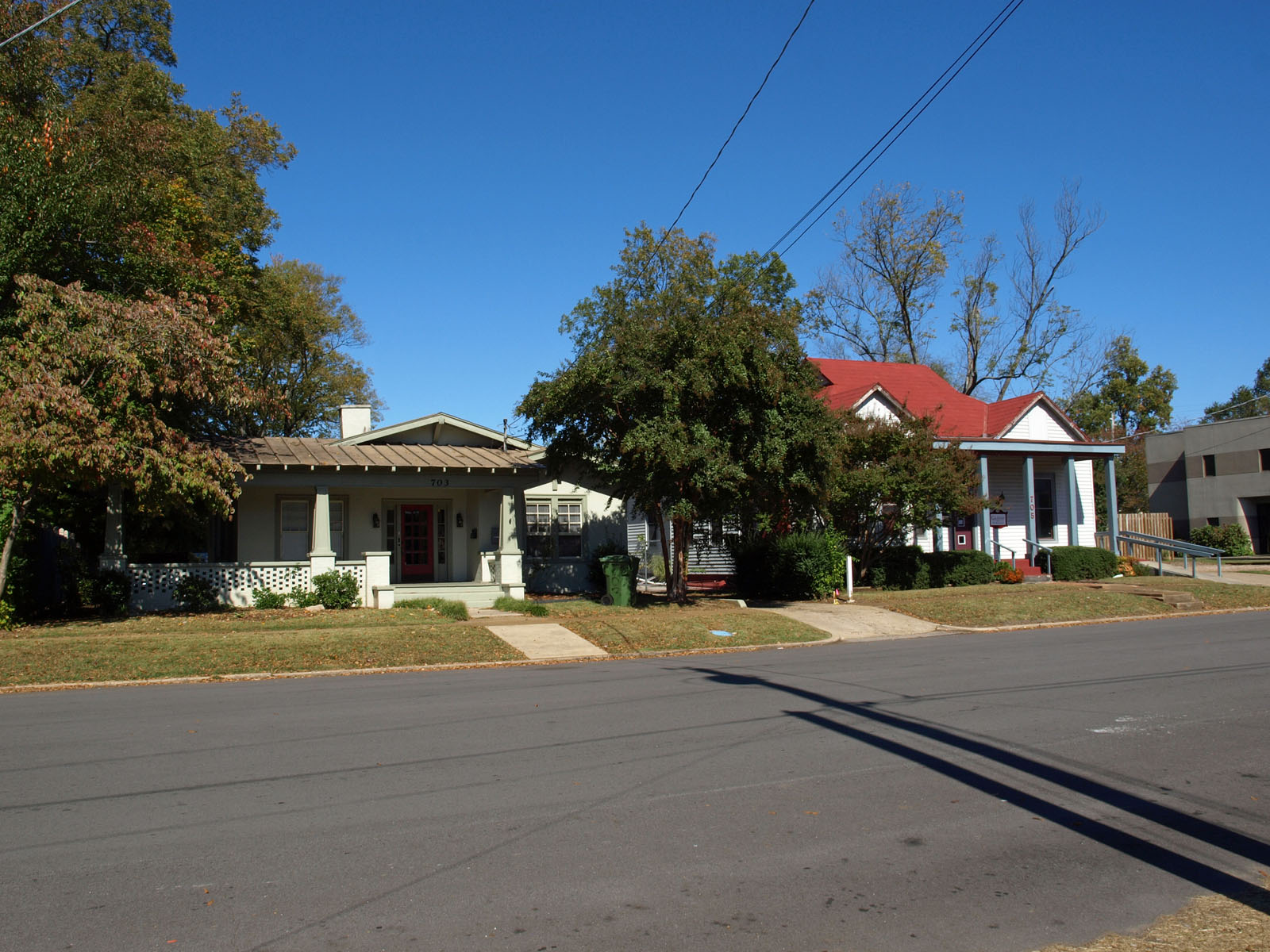
- 703 and 705 Ward Ave.
- Location: Roughly Beirne, Clinton, Eustis, Grayson, McCullough, Pratt, Randolph, Russell, Ward, Wellman, & Wells Aves. Huntsville, Alabama
- Coordinates: 34°44′19″N 86°34′22″W
- NRHP reference No.: 12000522
- Added to NRHP: August 20, 2012

The Five Points Historic District is a historic district in Huntsville, Alabama in the vicinity and east of the intersection of Holmes Avenue, Pratt Avenue, California Street, and Andrew Jackson Way. It features homes built around the turn of the 20th Century in several styles, including California Bungalow, Queen Anne and other modest Victorian styles dating from the late 1890s through the early 1900s. The district was listed on the National Register of Historic Places in August 2012.

== Notable structures ==
- Vaught House — 701 Ward Ave., added to National Register of Historic Places in 1981.
