= Five Points (Athens) =

Coordinates: 33°56′21.1″N 83°23′11.9″W

Five Points is a retail corridor and neighborhood in Athens, Georgia, centered on the intersection of Milledge Avenue and Lumpkin Street. It occupies the South-Southwest edge of the University of Georgia campus. Milledge Avenue is home to many University of Georgia Greek chapter houses, and is included in a tour by the Athens Welcome Center.
