= Imani School =

Coordinates: 29.645633°N 95.462773°W

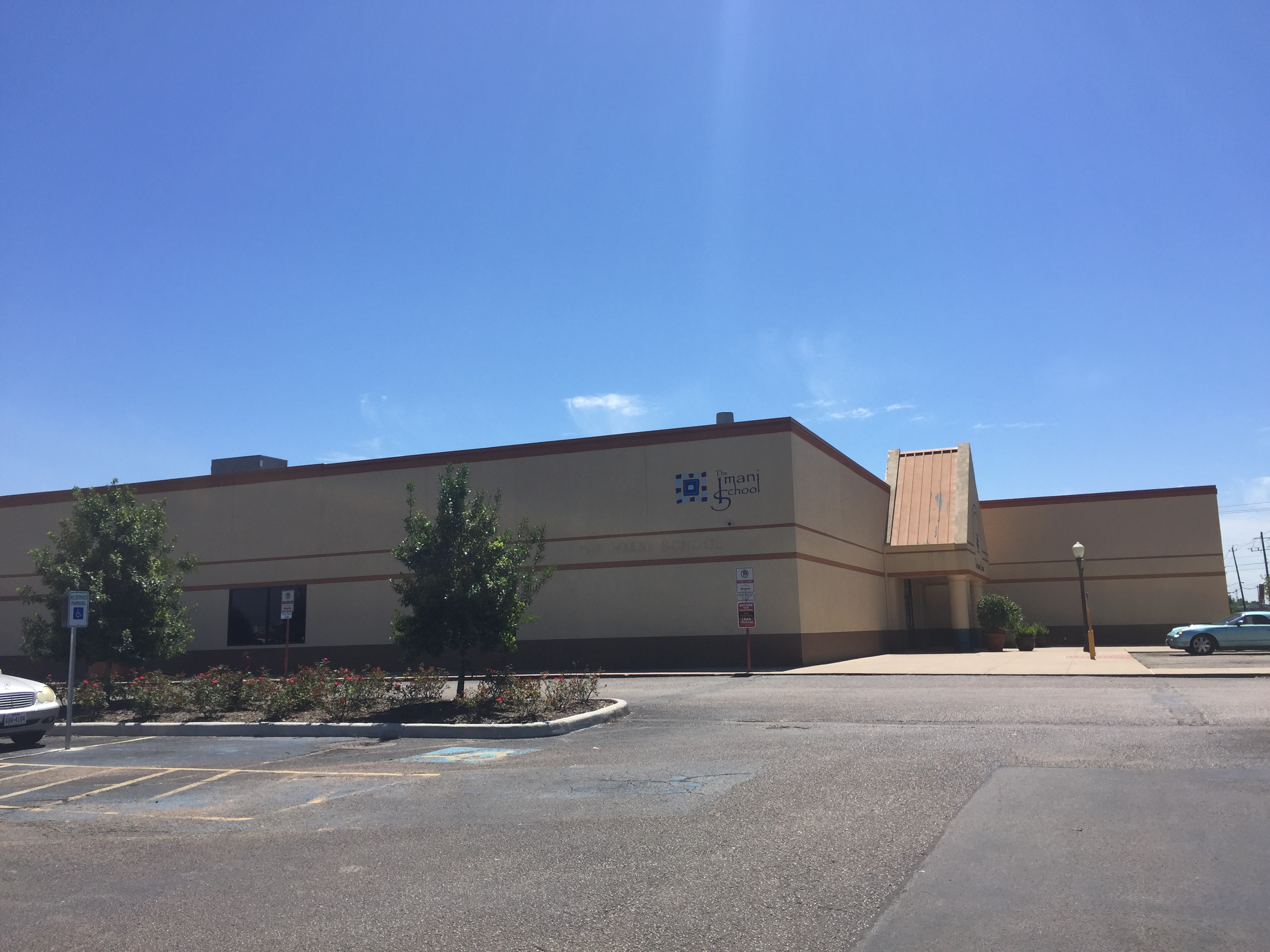
Imani School main building

The Imani School is a Christian private elementary and middle school in The Community Collective, a multi-purpose complex in the 5 Corners District, and in Southwest, Houston, Texas, United States. The school is marketed to African-American children.

== History ==
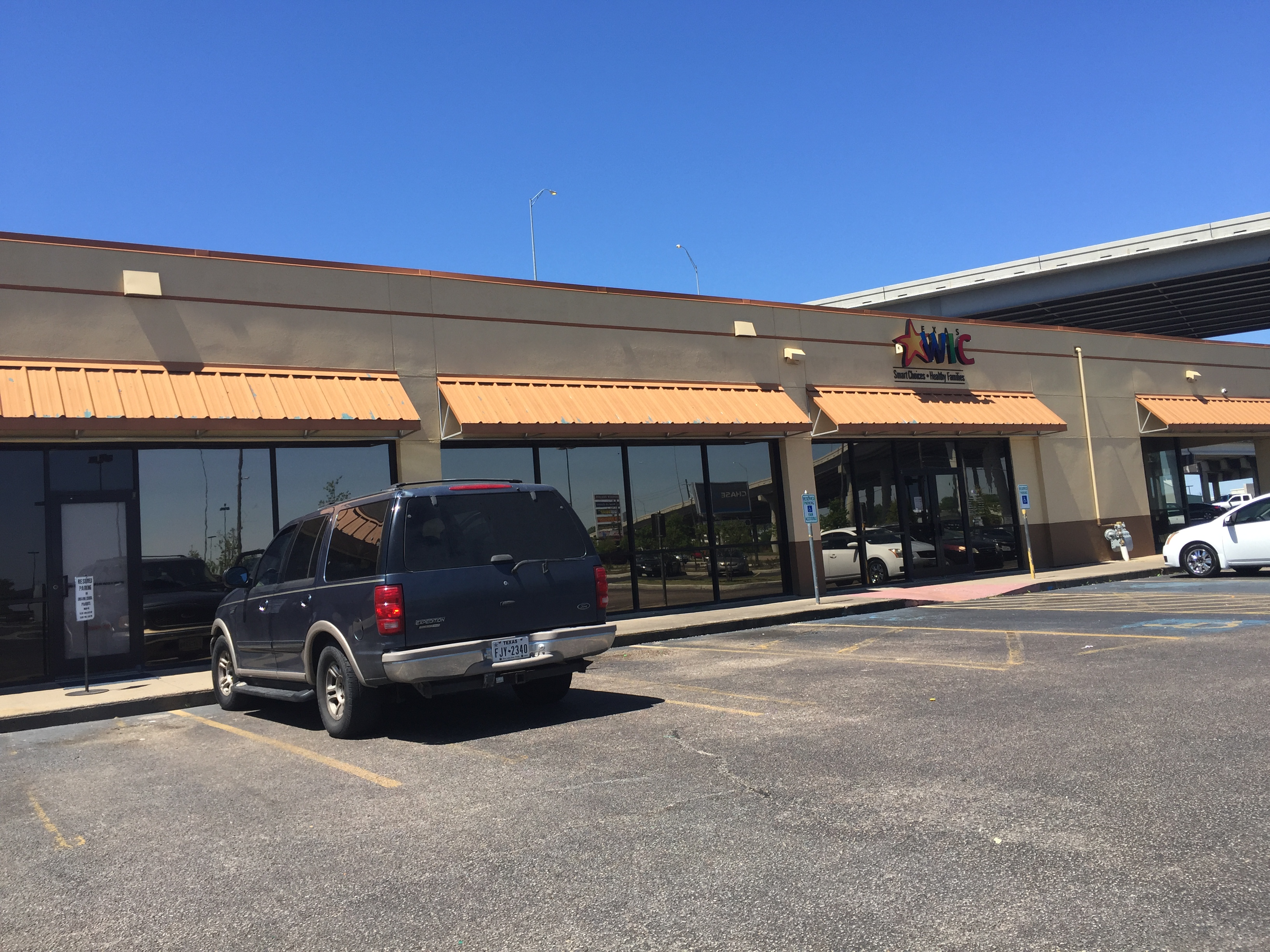
Preschool building

The Imani School was founded in 1988 and is an independent 501(c)3. It opened in the fall of that year in a church facility with 25 students. The name "Imani" is a Swahili word that means "faith" or "to believe."

By 1993, the school had moved into the Power Center, a 24 acres (9.7 ha) shopping center that included two vacant buildings with a total of 100,000-square-foot (9,300 m^{2}) of space. In addition to the school, the church also planned to lease spaces in the center to a bank, a medical clinic, several African-American owned businesses, and a job training center. In 1994, enrollment was 236, covering kindergarten through 5th grade. Within the original church building, the school had grown so large that some components of the community center, including the food pantry and clothing resale shop, had been relocated to another building, while the AIDS ministry, the fellowship hall, and several social services divisions remained in the building. The Power Center was completed in 1995. In 1996, Imani had 250 students.

Patricia Hogan Williams, the director of the school, said in 1998 that dropout rates among black students in public schools were "so high, we realized they weren't being taken care of[...]" and that the school aimed to cater to the needs of black students. That year the principal said that 90% of the graduates of the Imani school attend gifted and talented programs at public high schools.

== See also ==
- Corinthian Pointe
- History of the African-Americans in Houston
- Christianity in Houston
