= Five Corners District =

District of Houston, Texas, US

Coordinates: 29.7966°N 95.5281°W

Five Corners District is a management district covering sections of southern and Southwest Houston, Texas, United States.

== History ==
The Texas Legislature created the district in 2007. A business owner named Mehdi Banijamali stated that 25 property owners had signed to have the district created even though there were 1,400 property owners in its boundaries.

On one occasion a group of business owners sued the district, and a settlement ended that suit; as part of the settlement the business owners no longer had their properties assessed. Another suit was filed in 2012 with another group of business owners accusing the district organizers of deliberately excluding some businesses from the district.

== Areas ==
The district includes City Park, a 475-acre master-planned community, and the Village at Glen Iris subdivision. In 2019, the Houston Press reported that Five Corners contained more than 480 acres of parks and greenspace, including walking trails and playgrounds.

== Government and infrastructure ==
The current Houston Police Department Southwest Patrol Division Station is located in Cambridge Village Park, within the Five Corners district. The beginning of the construction was scheduled for February or March 2016 while the end of construction was scheduled for June–July 2017. It replaced a previous station inside the 610 Loop. It has a total of 55,000 square feet (5,100 m^{2}) of space, including a 2,300-square-foot (210 m^{2}) community room. The cost was $21 million.

== Education ==
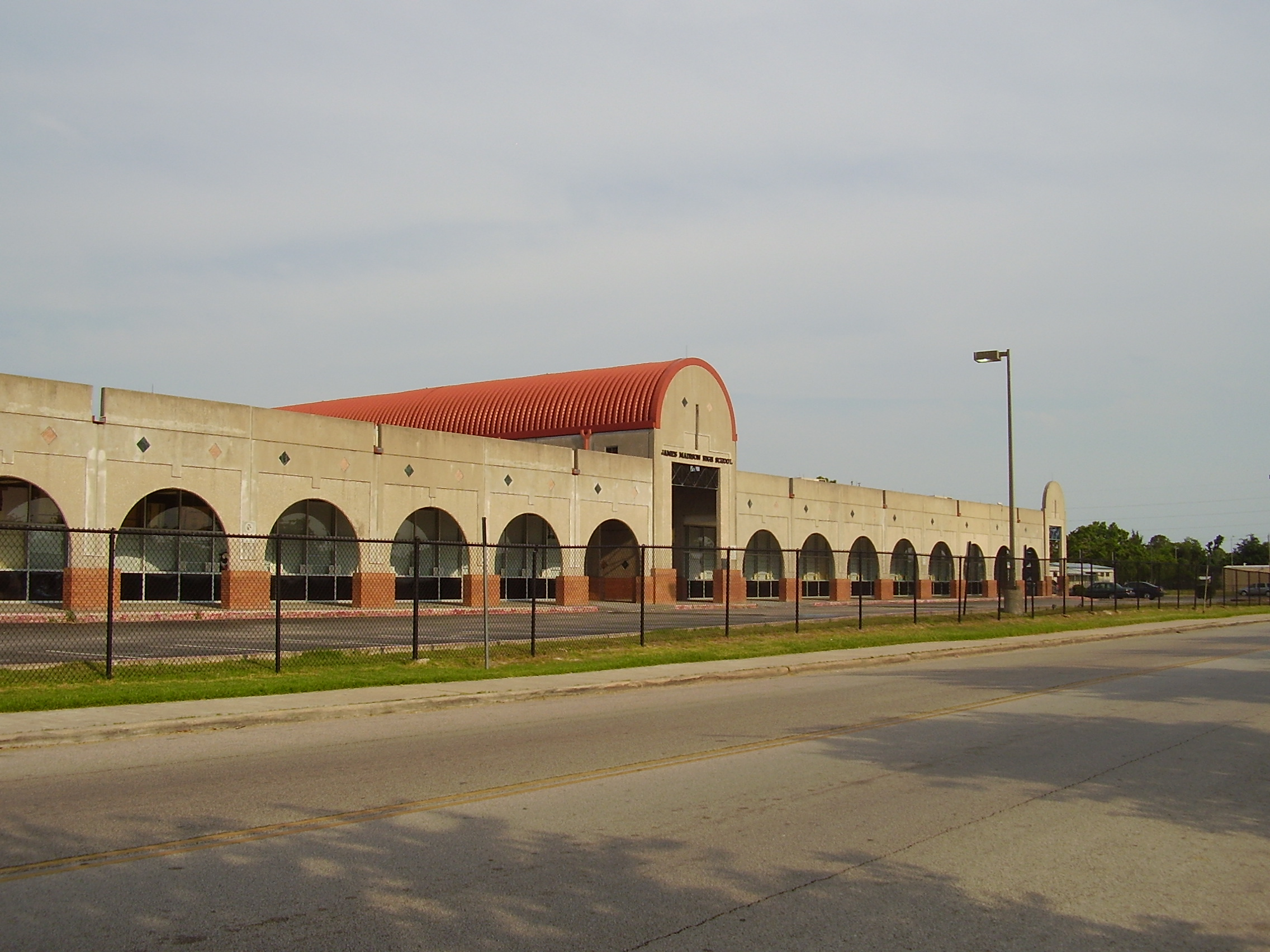
Madison High School

Residents are in the Houston Independent School District. Zoned middle schools serving sections of Five Corners include Attucks in Sunnyside, Lawson (formerly Dowling) in Hiram Clarke, Billy Reagan K-8, Thomas, and Welch in Fondren Southwest. Zoned high schools serving sections of Five Corners include Madison High School and Worthing High School.

In 2019 Susie Tommaney, a contributing writer to the Houston Press, stated "Report cards from area schools are mixed" and that there were "Decent schools, including the area high school".

St. Nicholas School (K-8) is an Anglican school. It will later occupy a new development on a 47-acre (19 ha) property along South Main Street.

The private school The Imani School is in Five Corners.
