= Classical school =

Classical school or Classical School may refer to:

== Academic schools of thought ==
- Classical school (chess), a school of chess
- Classical school (criminology), a school of thought in criminology
- Classical economics
- New classical macroeconomics, which emerged in the 1970s as a response to the failure of Keynesian economics

== Artistic styles ==
- Classical architecture
- Classical painting
- Classical sculpture

== Educational institutions ==
- A school which provides a classical education
- Alexander Classical School, a former school in Alexander, New York, United States
- Basking Ridge Classical School, a former school in Bernards Township, New Jersey, United States
- Burnham Classical School for Girls, a former school in Northampton, Massachusetts, United States
- Classical High School, a high school in Providence, Rhode Island, United States
- Classical School of the Medes, a private English-based network of schools operating in the secure Kurdish region of Northern Iraq
- Delaware Valley Classical School, a Christian K-12 school in New Castle, Delaware, United States
- Hellenic Classical Charter School, a school in New York City, United States
- Hopkins Classical School, a former secondary school in Cambridge, Massachusetts, United States
- Lynn Classical High School, a high school in Lynn, Massachusetts, United States
- Massey Hill Classical High School, a high school in Fayetteville, North Carolina, United States
- Metro Academic and Classical High School, a high school in St. Louis, Missouri, United States
- Miss Orton's Classical School for Girls, a former private girls' school in Pasadena, California, United States
- Ridgeview Classical Schools, a school in Fort Collins, Colorado, United States
- St Patrick's Classical School, a Roman Catholic secondary school in Navan, County Meath, Ireland
- Seventy-First Classical Middle School, a middle school in Fayetteville, North Carolina, United States
- Trinity Classical School, a Christian preparatory school in Houston, Texas, United States
- Woodrow Wilson Classical High School, a high school in Long Beach, California, United States
- Worcester Classical High School, a former high school in Worcester, Massachusetts, United States
