= NCSO =

NCSO may refer to:

- Nassau County Sheriff's Office (Florida)
- North Carolina Science Olympiad
- National Census and Statistics Office, a preceding agency of the Philippine Statistics Authority
- National Construction Safety Officer, a Canadian certified safety professional designation
- NERC Certified System Operator, an American professional designation
