= Egg drop competition =

Design contest in which an egg is dropped

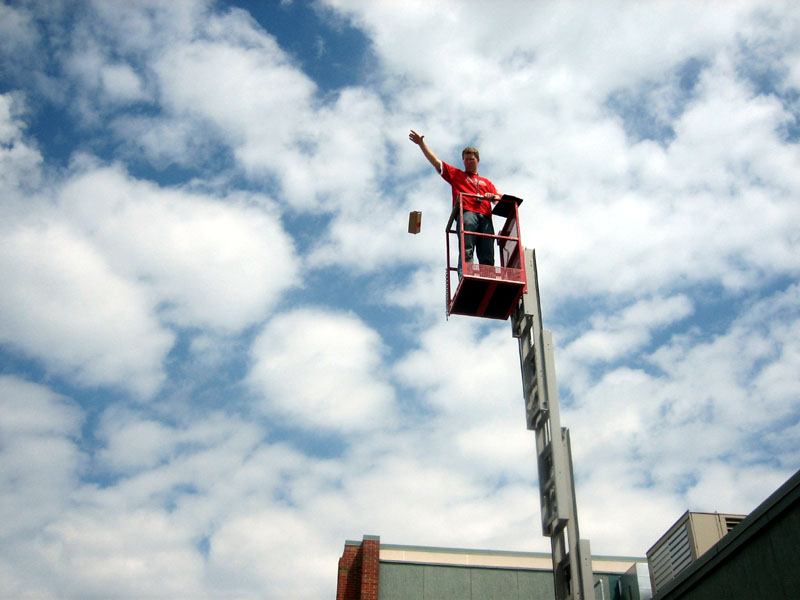
A physics teacher on a lift drops a package designed to protect three eggs from a fall of ten meters

The egg drop contest is an experiment usually performed by college or primary school students. Competitors typically attempt to create a device that can keep a raw chicken egg intact when dropped from a height. Students are asked to build a device made from a limited or unlimited amount of materials to support an egg when dropped from various heights.

== Regional competitions ==
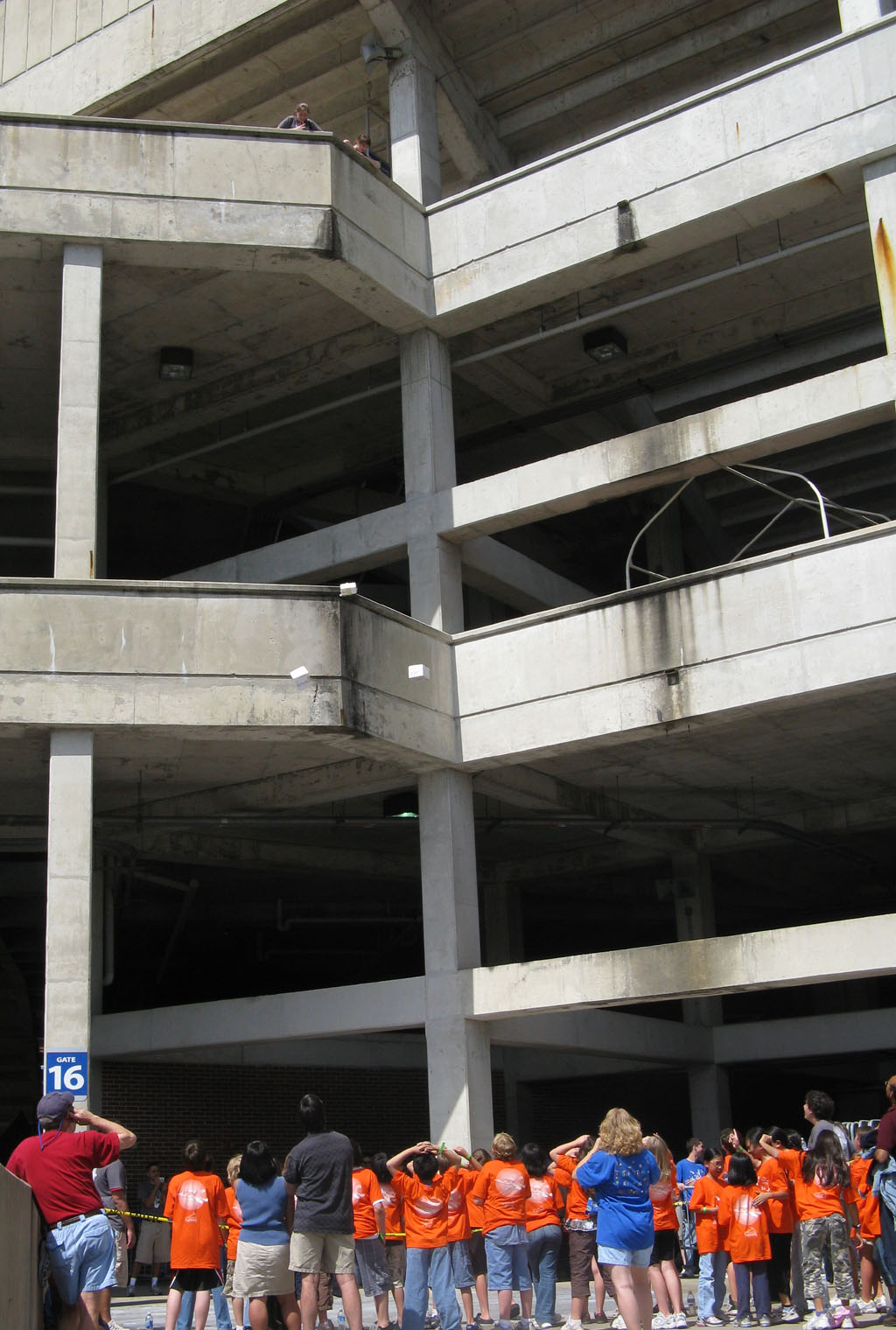
Students await the dropping of an egg as part of a SECME Olympiad at the University of Florida

Often schools work together to make larger competitions that pit more students against each other. One of the larger regional egg drop competitions is the Winston-Salem / Forsyth County Egg Drop Competition that takes place during Engineers Week (late February) each year.

Egg drop is one of 18 events in the North Carolina Science Olympiad elementary competition. More than 100 teams compete in this annual competition.

== Variations ==
A variation of the egg drop competition is the naked egg drop, in which an exposed raw egg is dropped into a container below that must catch the egg and keep it from breaking.

Another common variation is the egg hurl competition, where the containers are thrown by a device such as a trebuchet or air cannon. This variation is often used by schools that lack tall places from which to drop the containers. The egg hurl variation adds additional difficulties to the design of the container, since it is initially hurled at high speed and has to cope with horizontal as well as vertical velocities upon landing.

== See also ==
- Egg tossing
