= Science Olympiad =

American school science competition

Science Olympiad logo

Science Olympiad, sometimes abbreviated as SciOly or SO, is an American team competition in which students compete in 23 events pertaining to various fields of science. The subjects include earth science, biology, chemistry, physics, and engineering. Over 7,800 middle school and high school teams from 50 U.S. states compete with each year. The U.S. territories do not compete. However, several international teams do compete in Science Olympiad tournaments in the U.S.

There are multiple levels of the competition: invitational, regional, state, and national. Invitational tournaments, usually run by high schools and universities, are unofficial tournaments and serve as practice for regional and state competitions. Teams that excel at regional competitions advance to the state level; the top one or two teams from each state (depending on the state) then advance the national level. Winners later receive several kinds of awards, including medals, trophies and plaques, as well as scholarships. The program for elementary-age students is less common and less consistent. Schools have flexibility to implement the program to meet their needs. Some communities host competitive elementary tournaments.

Science Olympiad is organized at the national level by Science Olympiad Inc., a 501(c)(3) non-profit based in Oak Brook, Illinois.

== History ==
The first recorded Science Olympiad was held on Saturday, November 23, 1974, at St. Andrews Presbyterian College in Laurinburg, North Carolina. Dr. Barnes and Dr. David Wetmore were the originators of this event. Fifteen schools from North and South Carolina participated in this event. It was a day-long affair, with competitions and demonstrations for high school students in the areas of biology, chemistry, and physics. There were four event periods during this day and each event period had one fun event (like beaker race or paper airplane), one demonstration (like glassblowing and holography), and one serious event (like periodic table quiz or Science Bowl). An article by David Wetmore was published in the Journal of Chemical Education in January 1978 documenting the success of recruiting students through Science Olympiad. St. Andrews Presbyterian College continues to host a Science Olympiad tournament to this day. Mr. John C. "Jack" Cairns was a teacher at Dover High School in Delaware when he learned about the Science Olympiad tournament in North Carolina. He shared this information with Dr. Douglas R. Macbeth, the Delaware State Science Supervisor. Mr. Cairns was appointed to a steering committee to organize the first Science Olympiad in Delaware which took place at Delaware State University in the Spring of 1977. A write-up in The Science Teacher of December 1977 caught the attention of Gerard Putz, who proposed that the program be expanded throughout the United States. After competition tests in Michigan at the Lawrence Institute of Technology and Oakland University in 1983 and 1984, Putz and Delaware director John Cairns took their plan for a national competition to the National Science Teachers Conference in Boston. The first National Tournament was attended by representatives of 17 states, held at Michigan State University in 1985. Since then, the program has expanded greatly, with 60 teams present in each division at the National Tournament. Gerard Putz passed away in December 2019 and was succeeded as CEO and President of Science Olympiad Inc. by his daughter, Jennifer Kopach. Kopach also serves as CEO and President of Science Olympiad USA Foundation, a 509(a)(3) supporting organization that awards college scholarships to high school seniors and research grants to program alumni.

== International Teams ==
Since 2012, a Global Ambassador Team from Japan has been invited to attend the national tournament as part of a partnership between Science Olympiad, MEXT and JST. Each year, the Grand Prize for winning the Japan High School Science Championships (JHSSC), a competition styled after the U.S.-based Science Olympiad is a trip to the U.S. to participate in the Science Olympiad National Tournament. The Japanese Global Ambassador Team does however only compete on a limited basis as unranked guests. Japan continues to send a team, as of the 2025 National Tournament. The Japanese Global Ambassador Teams are the best known international teams that participate in Science Olympiad however other countries do occasionally participate in tournaments.

Canada has multiple active Science Olympiad teams and participated in the nationals tournaments in the U.S. between 1995 and 1998 but has not sent a team since although Canadian teams do still occasionally participate in tournaments in the U.S.

== Divisions ==
There are three divisions in the hierarchy of Science Olympiad:

- Division A for elementary school (grades K–6)
- Division B for middle school (grades 6–9)
- Division C for high school (grades 9–12)

The national tournament and generally state and regional tournaments are only for divisions B and C. Division A teams usually have separate interscholastic tournaments, apart from the more common intra-school competitions. Note that 6th and 9th graders have the option of competing in either of the two divisions in which they meet the grade requirements and are part of the competing school. (6th graders can compete in divisions A and B while 9th graders can compete in divisions B and C.) Students in grades lower than the division in which the school competes in may also be on the team. Teams are restricted to five 9th graders for division B and seven 12th graders for division C. Students may not participate on multiple teams, e.g. a 9th grader on both a high school and middle school team would not be allowed.

== Events and event history ==
In Divisions A, B and C, teams may compete in up to twenty-three main events, which usually occur over a single day (some tournaments, such as the Texas State tournament, run competitive events over multiple days); done by a team of no more than 15 members. Events fall into five main categories: Life, Personal & Social Science; Earth & Space Science; Physical Science & Chemistry; Technology & Engineering; and Inquiry & Nature of Science. They are either knowledge-based (for example, written tests on earth science, physics, astronomy, or biology), hands-on (for example, chemistry lab practicals or events involving both device testing and an exam), or engineering-based (participants construct a device before the competition to do specified tasks on the day of the competition).

Knowledge-based events generally have two to three participants taking a test and/or mathematically analyzing data. Examples of such events are Anatomy and Physiology, Meteorology, Codebusters, and Solar System.

Hands-on events generally consist of two to three participants performing experiments or interacting with physical objects to achieve a certain goal. Some examples are Experimental Design (three people) and Write it Do it (two people).

Engineering-based events have a team of two participants. They are to construct a device following a specific event's parameters and test the device against others. Examples include Bridge, Flight, Wheeled Vehicle, and Roller Coaster.

The majority of events allow two team members, though a few allow more. If one member is unable to attend an event, the other is able to continue, depending on the event. If the team has one available, a backup team member may be placed with the member as opposed to their former partner.

The list of events and rules for each change and are updated every year to input dynamism and to limit the advantages of more experienced teams. Events of each type often rotate, with each event staying in competition rotation for at least two years. For example, the Division C vehicle event cycle is two years each of Electric Vehicle, Mousetrap Vehicle, Gravity Vehicle, and Scrambler respectively.

States have substantial leeway in how they run their organization; several states, notably North Carolina and Texas, run altered slates of events; in the case of Texas, teams can choose to replace National events with state-exclusive events.

=== 2026-2027 events ===
Event name
Division B events	Division C events
Anatomy and Physiology	Anatomy and Physiology
Boomilever	Astronomy
Botany	Boomilever
Circuit Lab	Botany
Codebusters	Chemistry Lab
Crime Busters	Circuit Lab
Disease Detectives	Codebusters
Dynamic Planet	Designer Genes
Elastic Launched Glider	Disease Detectives
Experimental Design	Dynamic Planet
Food Science	Electric Vehicle
Heredity	Engineering CAD
Hovercraft	Experimental Design
Meteorology	Forensics
Ping Pong Parachute	Hovercraft
Remote Sensing	Mission Possible
Rocks and Minerals	Ping Pong Parachute
Roller Coaster	Protein Modeling
Scrambler	Remote Sensing
Solar System	Rocks and Minerals
Thermodynamics	Thermodynamics
Water Quality	Water Quality
Write It Do It	Wright Stuff

=== 2025-2026 events ===
Event name
Division B events	Division C events
Anatomy and Physiology	Anatomy and Physiology
Boomilever	Astronomy
Circuit Lab	Boomilever
Codebusters	Bungee Drop
Crime Busters	Chemistry Lab
Disease Detectives	Circuit Lab
Dynamic Planet	Codebusters
Entomology	Designer Genes
Experimental Design	Disease Detectives
Helicopter	Dynamic Planet
Heredity	Electric Vehicle
Hovercraft	Engineering CAD
Machines	Entomology
Meteorology	Experimental Design
Metric Mastery	Forensics
Mission Possible	Helicopter
Potions and Poisons	Hovercraft
Remote Sensing	Machines
Rocks and Minerals	Materials Science
Scrambler	Remote Sensing
Solar System	Robot Tour
Water Quality	Rocks and Minerals
Write It Do It	Water Quality

=== 2024-2025 events ===
Event name
Division B events	Division C events
Air Trajectory	Air Trajectory
Anatomy & Physiology	Anatomy & Physiology
Codebusters	Astronomy
Crime Busters	Bungee Drop
Disease Detectives	Chemistry Lab
Dynamic Planet	Codebusters
Ecology	Disease Detectives
Entomology	Dynamic Planet
Experimental Design	Ecology
Fossils	Electric Vehicle
Helicopter	Entomology
Meteorology	Experimental Design
Metric Mastery	Forensics
Microbe Mission	Fossils
Mission Possible	Geologic Mapping
Optics	Helicopter
Potions and Poisons	Materials Science
Reach for the Stars	Microbe Mission
Road Scholar	Optics
Scrambler	Robot Tour
Tower	Tower
Wind Power	Wind Power
Write It Do It	Write It Do It

=== 2023–2024 events ===
Event name
Division B events	Division C events
Air Trajectory	Air Trajectory
Anatomy and Physiology	Anatomy and Physiology
Can't Judge a Powder	Astronomy
Codebusters	Chem Lab
Crime Busters	Codebusters
Disease Detectives	Detector Building
Dynamic Planet	Disease Detectives
Ecology	Dynamic Planet
Experimental Design	Ecology
Fast Facts	Fermi Questions
Forestry	Flight
Fossils	Forensics
Meteorology	Forestry
Microbe Mission	Fossils
Optics	Geologic Mapping
Reach for the Stars	Microbe Mission
Road Scholar	Optics
Roller Coaster	Robot Tour
Tower	Scrambler
Wheeled Vehicle	Tower
Wind Power	Wind Power
Write it Do it	Write it Do it

=== 2017–2018 events ===
Event name
Division B events	Division C events
Anatomy and Physiology	Anatomy and Physiology
Battery Buggy	Astronomy
Crime Busters	Chem Lab
Disease Detectives	Disease Detectives
Ecology	Ecology
Experimental Design	Experimental Design
Fast Facts	
Game On	Forensics
Meteorology	Hovercraft
Microbe Mission	Materials Science
Mission Possible	Microbe Mission
Mousetrap Vehicle	Optics
Mystery Architecture	Remote Sensing
Optics	Rocks and Minerals
Potions and Poisons	Thermodynamics
Road Scholar	Towers
Rocks and Minerals	Wright Stuff
Roller Coaster	Write It Do It
Solar System	—N/a
Thermodynamics	—N/a
Towers	—N/a
Write It Do It	—N/a

=== 2015–2016 events ===
Event name
Division B events	Division C events
Air Trajectory	Air Trajectory
Anatomy and Physiology	Anatomy and Physiology
Bio-Process Lab	Astronomy
Bottle Rocket	Bridge Building
Can't Judge a Powder	Cell Biology
Crave the Wave	Chem Lab
Crime Busters	Disease Detectives
Disease Detectives	Dynamic Planet
Dynamic Planet	Electric Vehicle
Elastic Launched Gliders	Experimental Design
Experimental Design	Forensics
Food Science	Fossils
Fossils	GeoLogic Mapping
Game On	Green Generation
Green Generation	Hydrogeology
Invasive Species	Invasive Species
Meteorology	It's About Time
Mission Possible	Protein Modeling
Picture This	Robot Arm
Reach for the Stars	Wind Power
Road Scholar	Write It Do It
Scrambler	—N/a
Solar System	—N/a
Wind Power	—N/a
Write It Do It	—N/a

== Trial and pilot events ==
Trial/Pilot events are, at Regional and State tournaments, events that are specific to that state that are being considered as events for the next year. At Regionals and States, these events may count towards the team's score. At Nationals, however, there is a completely different set of Trial/Pilot events, sometimes known as "alternate events" because the people entering them do not have to be on the official team. These do not count towards the team's score, but ribbons and medals are usually awarded.

=== Distinction between trial and pilot events ===
The terms "trial event" and "pilot event" (also called "exploratory event") are sometimes interchangeable, both pertaining to an event that is not an official, national event for the year. However, at the National Tournament, there are often two differences. First, in 2010, it was announced that medals would only be awarded to the top 3 in the Trial events, but not at all in the Pilot events. Also, the Trial event are often much closer to becoming official events for following years than pilot events. Almost all of the Trial events from recent National tournaments have become official events within a few years of the tournament, while the same is not true for almost any of the pilot events.

== Team structure ==
Teams are hosted by the school from which the participants attend. A team can consist of up to 15 students and any number of alternates; some states allow more students per team. At the middle school level at nationals, only five ninth graders are allowed to compete on one team; at the high school level, only seven twelfth graders are allowed per team. However, state organizations occasionally amend these rules. Homeschool groups may also form as many teams as they need to compete, provided each team consists only of students residing in, at most, two contiguous counties.

Although teams may have an unlimited number of alternates, it is implicitly stated within the rules that competitors present at the event must have completed all of the work on their event. This is specifically aimed at building events. It is illegal for teams to have their alternates as "builders" and their formal team members as "thinkers". Judges at the event are allowed to ask any question of the machine or contraption in an effort to keep the scenario above from occurring. Nonetheless, competitors, coaches, and entire teams are expected to have integrity and to abide by this rule.

== Scoring ==
The winner of the competition is determined by each team's overall score. Each school is ranked in every event based on that event's rules. For each type of event, the ranking differs. Knowledge events are scored by the correct number of answers; the team with the highest score will receive 1st place, the second highest will receive 2nd place, and so on. If two teams are tied, there are usually tiebreaker questions that apply only to those teams that are tied. The non-testing events are scored based on the individual requirements listed in the Science Olympiad rule book, released each year to reflect new events, requirements, and clarifications. Some events, such as the knowledge/testing-based will rank teams by using the highest scores. However others may use the lowest score. The team's overall score is then calculated by adding together the rank of the school in all events (e.g. 1st place receives 1 point, 2nd place 2 points, etc.). The team with the lowest overall score is declared the winner. However, some state competitions choose to score the competition by awarding more points per place (e.g. 13 points for 1st place, 12 points for 2nd place, etc.) and having the team with the most points being declared the winner.

There are several ways to break a tie (draw):

- One method for tie-breaking is based on medals where the team with more first place medals wins. If both teams have the same amount of first places, it moves to second place medals and so on. This is the method that the National Tournament uses.
- Before a competition, the event organizer decides on several events to be used as tie-breakers. If two teams get the same score overall, the team that rates highest in that one event will take the lead.
- A third way of tie-breaking is to use a team's score in trial/pilot events. The team with the best combined score in trial events would win the competition when this method is used.
- In some competitions, there also may questions added into event, labeled as tie-breakers. If needed, these questions can be used as tie breakers, although this type of tie-breaker is generally for only the event and not the overall rank.

== Competition levels ==
Science Olympiad competitions occur at the regional, state and national level. Normally, the top few teams advance from the regional level to state competition, the exact number depending on how many regions there are and how many teams compete. For example, in Ohio, the number of teams qualifying for the state tournament from each regional depends solely on the number of teams participating at that regional, whereas in New York the allocation system involved determining whether or not the winning team in a regional tournament had won the previous year (this method has since been discontinued). In most states, the top team advances from the state to the national competition. Some states with a larger number of teams are allotted a second spot at the national competition to represent their larger participation. Currently, 120 teams compete at the national level each year (60 from Division B and 60 from Division C); the number has changed over the years to accommodate growing participation.

Many states also hold invitational tournaments. These competitions serve as "practice rounds" for qualifying tournaments, and are hosted by individual middle schools, high schools and/or colleges. Invitationals occur most commonly in January or February, although there have been some as early as October or as late as April. Teams can participate in invitationals from multiple states depending on availability. At some invitationals, only a few events are held. However, many invitational tournaments mimic regional and state competitions in their competitive intensity. For example, MIT hosts an invitational tournament each year with around 70 teams from over a dozen states, including 20 or more past national qualifiers. Other tournaments, especially in the Midwest, are well known for their quality and competitiveness. In this way, teams can gain extra practice before competing in regional, state, or national tournaments. In 2014, Yale University became one of the first institutions of higher education to host a tournament run by Science Olympiad alumni, with several more following over the next few years.

== National tournament ==
The National Science Olympiad competition is held in late May at a different university every year. Teams compete at the state competition with the top one or two schools in Division B and Division C each earning a spot at the national competition. Some states are given a second slot, based on the membership within the division. The total number of invited teams in each division is equal to 60 and the national tournament hosts 120 teams. In 2012, at the University of Central Florida, a team from Japan was invited as a Global Ambassador Team. Although they competed in several events, their scores were not tallied against the state teams.

The competition officially begins with opening ceremonies on Friday night that usually include a notable speaker, such as a Nobel Laureate. A traditional Swap Meet follows the opening ceremonies which is an opportunity for teams to meet and greet. They bring state memorabilia to trade with other teams. The most popular items include hats, license plates, T-shirts, and key chains.

Saturday includes several time blocks. Each block includes a 60-minute section for each study event, plus a 15-minute break time for competitors to get from one event to another.

That night, a formal Awards Ceremony is held. It opens with a short speech followed by awarding medals for the top six teams in each event. Points for all the events are added together to determine an overall national team winner. The trial events are not included in this tally. The top ten teams in each division are recognized with trophies and plaques.

In some national tournaments, scholarships are awarded to the top teams in each event. For the 2005 and 2010 competitions, held at the University of Illinois Urbana-Champaign, first-place event winners received full four-year tuition waivers to the university. At the 2006 National Tournament, host Indiana University awarded $7,000 annual scholarships to those who finished first place in Division C and who attend the university in their freshman year. The George Washington University offered Division C gold medalists at its 2008 National Tournament a $20,000 stipend for those who were accepted and attended GWU. In 2012, the University of Central Florida offered $30,000 scholarships to the university for first place medalists in Division C. Additional awards may also provided by sponsors and industry leaders for specific events. For example, the Centers for Disease Control and Prevention provided first place medalists in Disease Detectives (Divisions B & C) with a trip for the two competitors and their coach to tour its facility in Atlanta, Georgia.

== National locations and champions ==
This is a list of past national champions and locations.

		Division B		Division C	
Year	Location	School	State	School	State
1985	Michigan State University	Slauson Intermediate School	MI	Seaholm High School	MI
1986	Michigan State University	Slauson Intermediate School	MI	Seaholm High School	MI
1987	Ohio State University	Gompers Secondary School	CA	Irmo High School	SC
1988	Delaware State University	Irmo Middle School	SC	Haverford High School	PA
1989	University of Colorado, Boulder	Irmo Middle School	SC	Irmo High School	SC
1990	(Pennsylvania) Penn West Clarion	Irmo Middle School	SC	Irmo High School	SC
1991	(Missouri) Penn Valley Community College	Grandville Junior High School	MI	La Jolla High School	CA
1992	(Alabama) Auburn University	Jenison Junior High School	MI	La Jolla High School	CA
1993	University of Southern Colorado	Thomas Jefferson Middle School	IN	Grand Haven High School	MI
1994	University of Arizona	State College Junior High School	PA	Grand Haven High School	MI
1995	Indiana University	State College Junior High School	PA	Harriton High School	PA
1996	(Georgia (U.S. state)) Georgia Institute of Technology	Thomas Jefferson Middle School	IN	Troy High School	CA
1997	North Carolina State University	J.C. Booth Middle School	GA	Grand Haven High School	MI
1998	(Michigan) Grand Valley State University	J.C. Booth Middle School	GA	Solon High School	OH
1999	(Illinois) Chicago Museums and University of Chicago	J.C. Booth Middle School	GA	Troy High School	CA
2000	(Washington (state)) Eastern Washington University	J.C. Booth Middle School	GA	Troy High School	CA
2001	University of Colorado, Colorado Springs	J.C. Booth Middle School	GA	Harriton High School	PA
2002	University of Delaware	Rising Starr Middle School	GA	Troy High School	CA
2003	Ohio State University	J.C. Booth Middle School	GA	Troy High School	CA
2004	(Pennsylvania) Juniata College	J.C. Booth Middle School	GA	Fayetteville-Manlius High School	NY
2005	University of Illinois Urbana-Champaign	Community Middle School	NJ	Harriton High School	PA
2006	Indiana University, Bloomington	J.C. Booth Middle School	GA	Troy High School	CA
2007	(Kansas) Wichita State University	Community Middle School	NJ	Troy High School	CA
2008	(Washington, D.C.) The George Washington University	Solon Middle School	OH	Troy High School	CA
2009	(Georgia (U.S. state)) Augusta State University	Solon Middle School	OH	Centerville High School	OH
2010	University of Illinois Urbana-Champaign	Solon Middle School	OH	Centerville High School	OH
2011	University of Wisconsin–Madison	Solon Middle School	OH	Solon High School	OH
2012	University of Central Florida	Solon Middle School	OH	Solon High School	OH
2013	(Ohio) Wright State University	Solon Middle School	OH	Solon High School	OH
2014	University of Central Florida	Beckendorff Junior High School	TX	Troy High School	CA
2015	University of Nebraska–Lincoln	Solon Middle School	OH	Troy High School	CA
2016	University of Wisconsin–Stout	Daniel Wright Junior High School	IL	Mira Loma High School	CA
2017	(Ohio) Wright State University	Daniel Wright Junior High School	IL	Troy High School	CA
2018	Colorado State University	Solon Middle School	OH	Troy High School	CA
2019	(New York (state)) Cornell University	Kennedy Middle School	CA	Troy High School	CA
2020	North Carolina State University	Tournament not contested due to the COVID-19 pandemic			
2021	Arizona State University	Kennedy Middle School	CA	Mason High School	OH
2022	California Institute of Technology	Sierra Vista Middle School	CA	Mason High School	OH
2023	(Kansas) Wichita State University	Kennedy Middle School	CA	Adlai E. Stevenson High School	IL
2024	Michigan State University	Kennedy Middle School	CA	Monta Vista High School	CA
2025	University of Nebraska–Lincoln	Sierra Vista Middle School	CA	Seven Lakes High School	TX
2026	University of Southern California	Sierra Vista Middle School	CA	Monta Vista High School	CA
2027	Ohio State University	TBD	TBD	TBD	TBD
2028	(Georgia (U.S. state)) Georgia Institute of Technology	TBD	TBD	TBD	TBD
2029	University of Illinois Urbana-Champaign	TBD	TBD	TBD	TBD

=== List of National Championships by School ===
Division B
Rank	School	No. of Championships	Years
1	J.C. Booth M.S. (GA)	8	1997, 1998, 1999, 2000, 2001, 2003, 2004, 2006
1	Solon M.S. (OH)	8	2008, 2009, 2010, 2011, 2012, 2013, 2015, 2018
3	Kennedy M.S. (CA)	4	2019, 2021, 2023, 2024
4	Irmo M.S. (SC)	3	1988, 1989, 1990
4	Sierra Vista M.S. (CA)	3	2022, 2025, 2026
6	Slauson I.S. (MI)	2	1985, 1986
6	Thomas Jefferson M.S. (IN)	2	1993, 1996
6	State College J.H.S. (PA)	2	1994, 1995
6	Community M.S. (NJ)	2	2005, 2007
6	Daniel Wright J.H.S. (IL)	2	2016, 2017
11	Gompers S.S. (CA)	1	1987
11	Grandville J.H.S. (MI)	1	1991
11	Jenison J.H.S. (MI)	1	1992
11	Rising Starr M.S. (GA)	1	2002
11	Beckendorff J.H.S. (TX)	1	2014

Division C
Rank	School	No. of Championships	Years
1	Troy H.S. (CA)	13	1996, 1999, 2000, 2002, 2003, 2006, 2007, 2008, 2014, 2015, 2017, 2018, 2019
2	Solon H.S. (OH)	4	1998, 2011, 2012, 2013
3	Grand Haven H.S. (MI)	3	1993, 1994, 1997
3	Harriton H.S. (PA)	3	1995, 2001, 2005
3	Irmo H.S. (SC)	3	1987, 1989, 1990
6	Seaholm H.S. (MI)	2	1985, 1986
6	La Jolla H.S. (CA)	2	1991, 1992
6	Centerville H.S. (OH)	2	2009, 2010
6	Monta Vista High School (CA)	2	2024, 2026
6	Mason H.S. (OH)	2	2021, 2022
11	Haverford H.S. (PA)	1	1988
11	Fayetteville-Manilus H.S. (NY)	1	2004
11	Mira Loma H.S. (CA)	1	2016
11	Adlai E. Stevenson High School (IL)	1	2023
11	Seven Lakes High School (TX)	1	2025

=== List of States by Number of National Tournaments Hosted ===
Rank	State	No. of Tournaments Hosted
1	Ohio	4
1	Colorado	4
3	Michigan	3
3	Illinois	3
5	Delaware	2
5	Pennsylvania	2
5	Indiana	2
5	Georgia	2
5	Wisconsin	2
5	Florida	2
5	Arizona	2
5	Kansas	2
5	California	2
5	Nebraska	2
15	Missouri	1
15	Alabama	1
15	North Carolina	1
15	Washington	1
15	Washington, DC	1

Eight universities have hosted the National Tournament twice: Michigan State University, Ohio State University, the University of Illinois Urbana-Champaign, Indiana University Bloomington, the University of Central Florida, Wichita State University, Wright State University, and the University of Nebraska–Lincoln.

== Division A ==
Division A generally covers elementary school students (through 6th grade). Schools which wish to start a Science Olympiad program at their school can take advantage of the resources offered on the National Science Olympiad website. There is no National membership fee required to participate in Elementary Division activities. An appropriate program will depend upon the objectives and resources of the local school or community. Programs can range from a Fun Night to a large competitive tournament. Some Elementary programs have existed as long as the National program, and have developed additional resources that schools may find helpful.

== Study Resources ==
Many study resources, including yearly rules manuals, can be found at the Science Olympiad website. Scioly.org is a separate forum site which hosts additional resources, including a wiki.
