= Hunters Creek Village, Texas =

City of Hunters Creek Village
- City
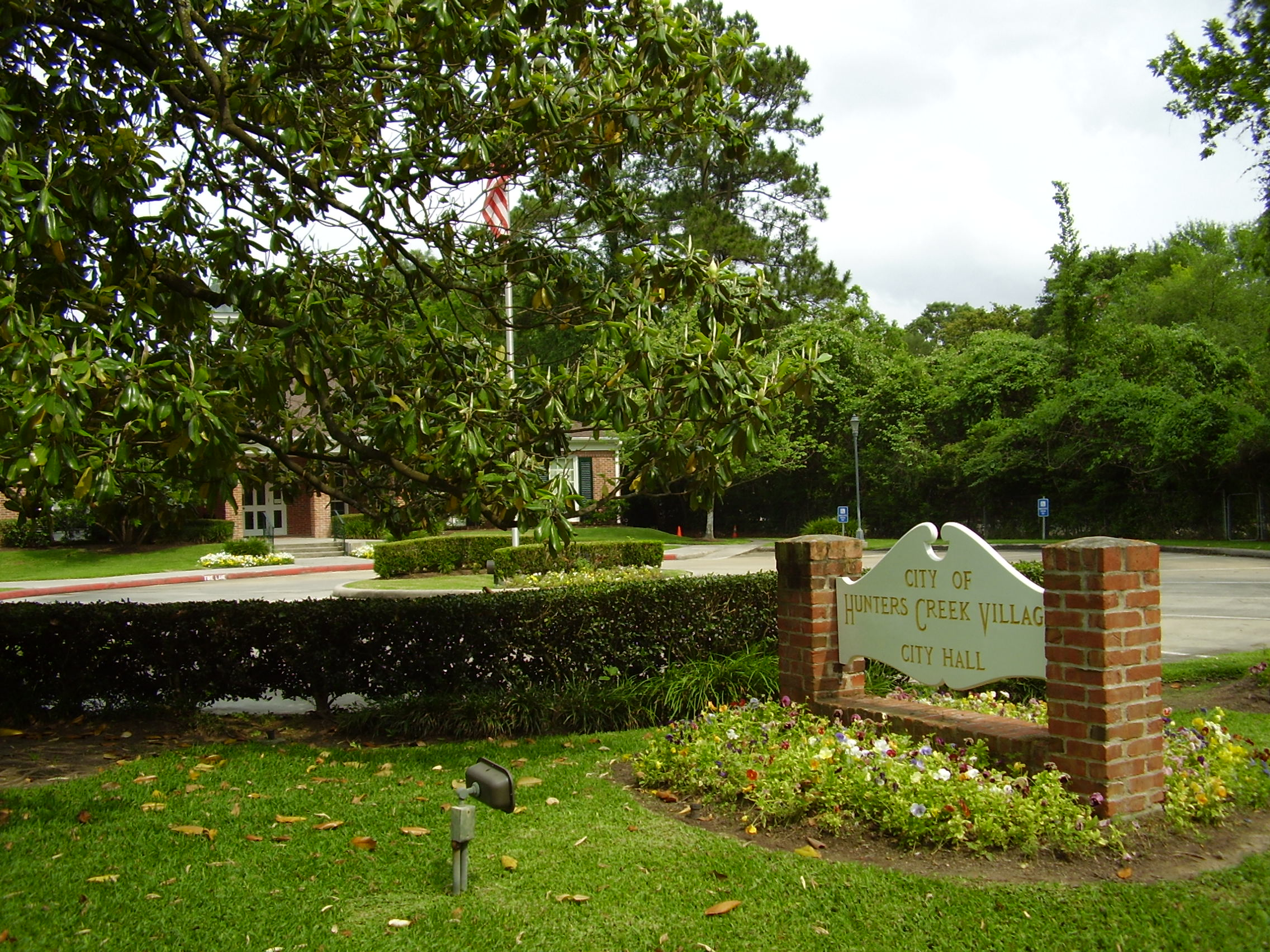
- Hunters Creek Village City Hall

- Location in Harris County and the state of Texas
- Coordinates: 29°46′11″N 95°30′1″W
- Country: United States
- State: Texas
- County: Harris
- Incorporated: 1954

Government
  - Type: City Council
  - Mayor: Jim Pappas

Area
  - Total: 1.95 sq mi (5.06 km^{2})
  - Land: 1.95 sq mi (5.06 km^{2})
  - Water: 0 sq mi (0.00 km^{2})
- Elevation: 66 ft (20 m)

Population (2020)
  - Total: 4,385
  - Density: 2,492.2/sq mi (962.25/km^{2})
- Time zone: UTC-6 (Central (CST))
  - Summer (DST): UTC-5 (CDT)
- ZIP code: 77024
- Area code: 713
- FIPS code: 48-35480
- GNIS feature ID: 1374180
- Website: cityofhunterscreek.com

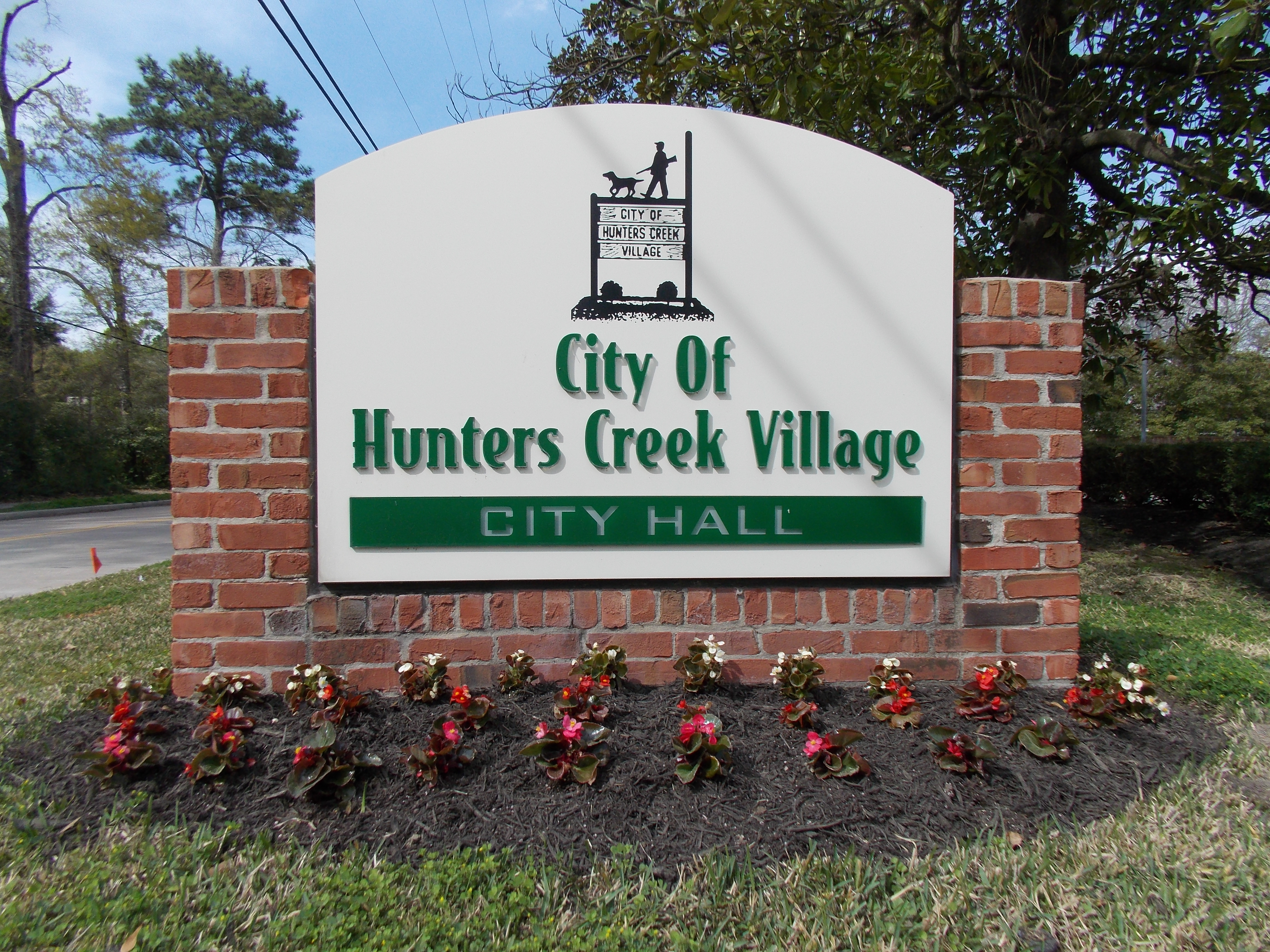

Hunters Creek Village is a city in Harris County, Texas, United States, part of the Greater Houston metropolitan area. The population was 4,385 at the 2020 census. It is part of a collection of upscale residential communities in west Houston known as the Memorial Villages.

As of 2022, Hunters Creek Village was the 403rd largest city in the State of Texas. As of 2000, Hunters Creek Village was the fifth wealthiest location in Texas by per capita income. A 2010 BusinessWeek study stated that Hunters Creek Village was the most expensive suburb in Texas.

== History ==
Prior to the incorporation of Hunters Creek Village, German farmers settled the area and opened sawmills. By 1936, the community had a sawmill and several residences.

In the mid-1950s, effort to form a Spring Branch municipality failed. The city incorporated in 1954 with a mayor-alderman government. Because of the 1954 incorporation, Houston did not incorporate Hunters Creek Village's territory into its city limits, while Houston annexed surrounding areas that were unincorporated. By 1966, the community had a school and a church. Between 1960 and 1980, the population increased from 2,478 to 4,580. In 1982, the population fell to 4,215. A total of 4,598 people lived in Hunters Creek Village in 1990.

In 2008, Forbes.com selected Hunters Creek Village, along with the adjacent community of Bunker Hill Village and (southwest suburban) Sugar Land, as one of the three Houston-area "Top Suburbs To Live Well."

== Geography ==
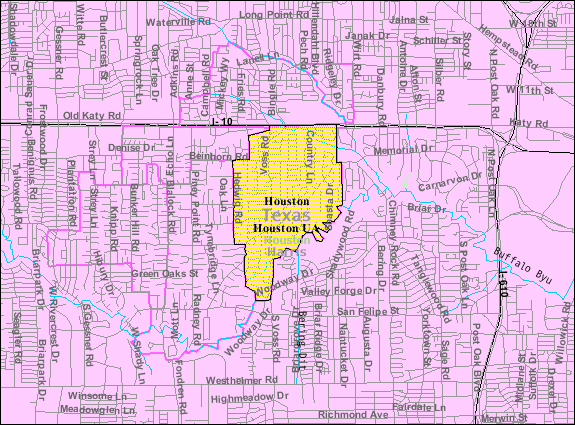
Map of Hunters Creek Village

Hunters Creek Village is located at 29°46′11″N 95°30′1″W (29.769632, –95.500190).

According to the United States Census Bureau, the city has a total area of 1.9 square miles (4.9 km^{2}), all land.

== Demographics ==
Historical population
Census	Pop.	Note	%±
1960	2,478		—
1970	3,959		59.8%
1980	4,215		6.5%
1990	3,954		−6.2%
2000	4,374		10.6%
2010	4,367		−0.2%
2020	4,385		0.4%
U.S. Decennial Census

=== Racial and ethnic composition ===
Hunters Creek Village city, Texas – Racial and ethnic composition Note: the US Census treats Hispanic/Latino as an ethnic category. This table excludes Latinos from the racial categories and assigns them to a separate category. Hispanics/Latinos may be of any race.
Race / Ethnicity (NH = Non-Hispanic)	Pop 2000	Pop 2010	Pop 2020	% 2000	% 2010	% 2020
White alone (NH)	3,949	3,788	3,508	90.28%	86.74%	80.00%
Black or African American alone (NH)	14	46	37	0.32%	1.05%	0.84%
Native American or Alaska Native alone (NH)	5	10	7	0.11%	0.23%	0.16%
Asian alone (NH)	209	263	350	4.78%	6.02%	7.98%
Native Hawaiian or Pacific Islander alone (NH)	0	0	0	0.00%	0.00%	0.00%
Other race alone (NH)	5	1	18	0.11%	0.02%	0.41%
Mixed race or Multiracial (NH)	35	62	129	0.80%	1.42%	2.94%
Hispanic or Latino (any race)	157	197	336	3.59%	4.51%	7.66%
Total	4,374	4,367	4,385	100.00%	100.00%	100.00%

=== 2020 census ===
As of the 2020 census, Hunters Creek Village had a population of 4,385. The median age was 45.3 years. 27.0% of residents were under the age of 18 and 18.6% of residents were 65 years of age or older. For every 100 females there were 96.8 males, and for every 100 females age 18 and over there were 95.5 males age 18 and over.

100.0% of residents lived in urban areas, while 0.0% lived in rural areas.

There were 1,415 households in Hunters Creek Village, of which 42.3% had children under the age of 18 living in them. Of all households, 79.4% were married-couple households, 8.8% were households with a male householder and no spouse or partner present, and 10.8% were households with a female householder and no spouse or partner present. About 11.1% of all households were made up of individuals and 7.7% had someone living alone who was 65 years of age or older.

There were 1,496 housing units, of which 5.4% were vacant. The homeowner vacancy rate was 2.2% and the rental vacancy rate was 12.5%.

Racial composition as of the 2020 census
Race	Number	Percent
White	3,575	81.5%
Black or African American	40	0.9%
American Indian and Alaska Native	14	0.3%
Asian	354	8.1%
Native Hawaiian and Other Pacific Islander	0	0.0%
Some other race	56	1.3%
Two or more races	346	7.9%
Hispanic or Latino (of any race)	336	7.7%

=== 2000 census ===
As of the census of 2000, there were 4,374 people, 1,471 households, and 1,291 families residing in the city. The population density was 2,253.0 inhabitants per square mile (869.9/km^{2}). There were 1,523 housing units at an average density of 784.5 per square mile (302.9/km^{2}). The racial makeup of the city was 93.37% White, 0.37% African American, 0.14% Native American, 4.80% Asian, 0.46% from other races, and 0.87% from two or more races. Hispanic or Latino of any race were 3.59% of the population.

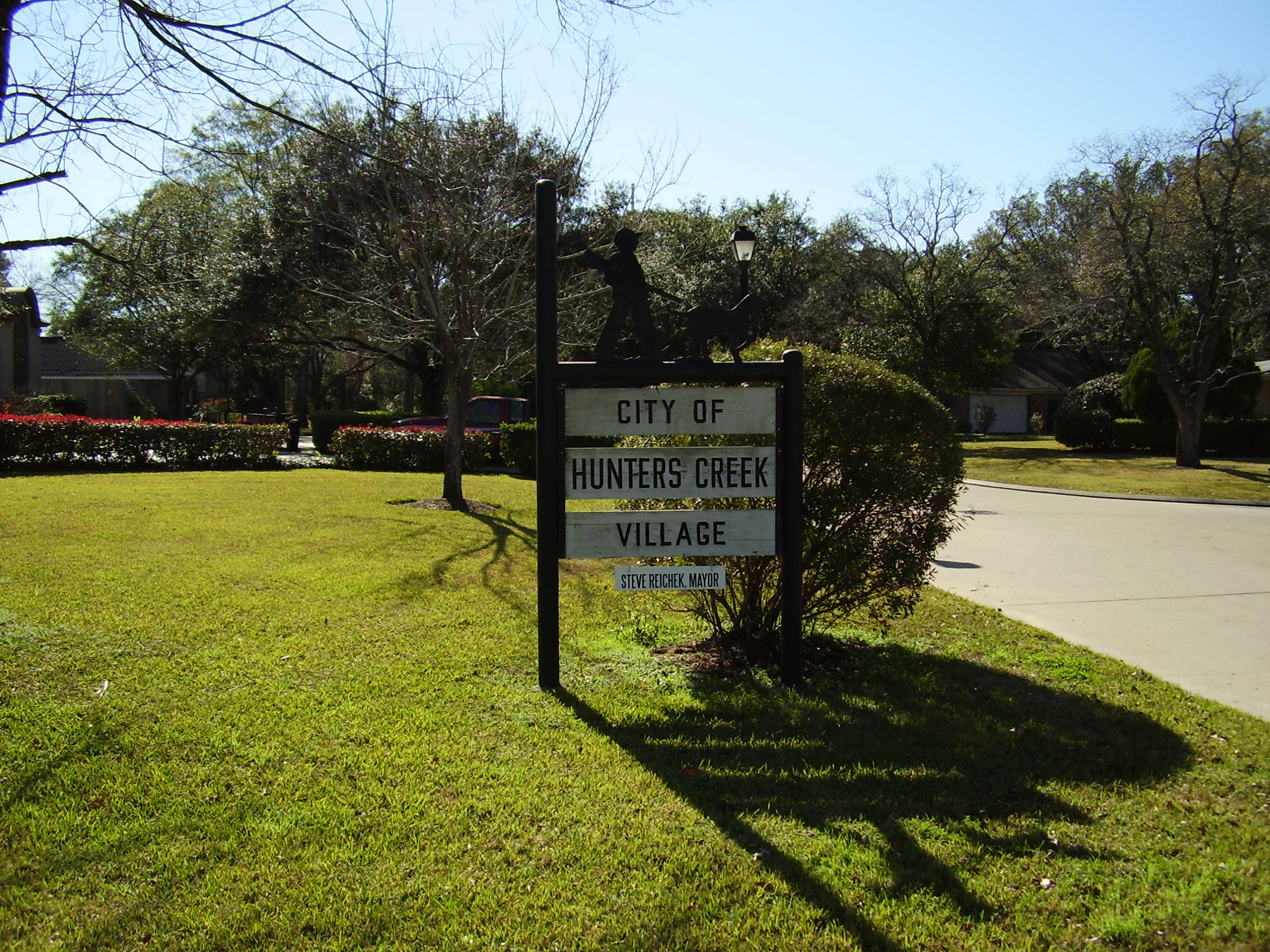
A sign indicating Hunters Creek Village

There were 1,471 households, out of which 43.6% had children under the age of 18 living with them, 82.9% were married couples living together, 3.9% had a female householder with no husband present, and 12.2% were non-families. 11.1% of all households were made up of individuals, and 7.7% had someone living alone who was 65 years of age or older. The average household size was 2.97 and the average family size was 3.19.

In the city, the population was spread out, with 31.2% under the age of 18, 3.3% from 18 to 24, 19.6% from 25 to 44, 29.9% from 45 to 64, and 15.9% who were 65 years of age or older. The median age was 43 years. For every 100 females, there were 92.8 males. For every 100 females age 18 and over, there were 89.4 males.

The median income for a household in the city was $171,294, and the median income for a family was $184,574. Males had a median income of $100,000 versus $48,750 for females. The per capita income for the city was $88,821. About 0.6% of families and 1.2% of the population were below the poverty line, including none of those under age 18 and 1.2% of those age 65 or over.

== Government and infrastructure ==
Hunters Creek Village is a general-law city, governed by a Mayor and a City Council of five Councilmembers, all of which serve for staggered two-year terms. The current mayor of Hunters Creek Village is Jim Pappas as of May 2017. The Mayor, with Council approval, appoints members of the city's Planning and Zoning Commission and Board of Adjustment.

Bunker Hill Village, Hunters Creek Village, and Piney Point Village jointly operate the Memorial Villages Police Department through the Board of Police Commissioners consisting of representatives of those three Memorial villages. The Village Fire Department, which serves all of the Memorial villages, is governed by a Board of Commissioners consisting of representatives of each of the six Memorial villages . Hedwig Village and the portions of Piney Point Village and Hunters Creek Village north of the Buffalo Bayou lie within and are served by the Memorial Villages Water Authority.

Harris County Precinct Three, headed by Tom Ramsey, serves Hunters Creek Village.

Hunters Creek Village is located in District 133 of the Texas House of Representatives. As of 2022 Mano DeAyala represents the district. Hunters Creek Village is within District 7 of the Texas Senate; as of 2022 Paul Bettencourt represents the district.

Hunters Creek Village is in Texas's 7th congressional district and represented as of 2022 by Wesley Hunt. In 2008, the pro-Republican Party publication Human Events identified the zip code 77024 as the zip code that gave the eighth largest contribution to John McCain's 2008 U.S. Presidential Election campaign. The zip code, which includes the portion of Hunters Creek Village north of the Buffalo Bayou, gave $540,309 United States dollars by October 24, 2008.

Harris Health System (formerly Harris County Hospital District) designated Northwest Health Center for ZIP code 77024 and Valbona Health Center (formerly People's Health Center) in Greater Sharpstown for 77063. The nearest public hospital is Ben Taub General Hospital in the Texas Medical Center.

== Politics ==
In the 2016 presidential election, Hunters Creek Village went to Republican nominee Donald Trump with 1,672 votes (67%) while Democratic nominee Hillary Clinton received 731 votes (29%). In the 2020 presidential election, Hunters Creek Village tallied 2,048 votes (68%) for Republican nominee Trump and 924 votes (31%) for Democratic nominee Joe Biden. In the 2024 presidential election, Republican nominee Trump garnered 1,997 votes (71%) in Hunters Creek Village to Democratic nominee Kamala Harris's 756 votes (27%).

== Education ==
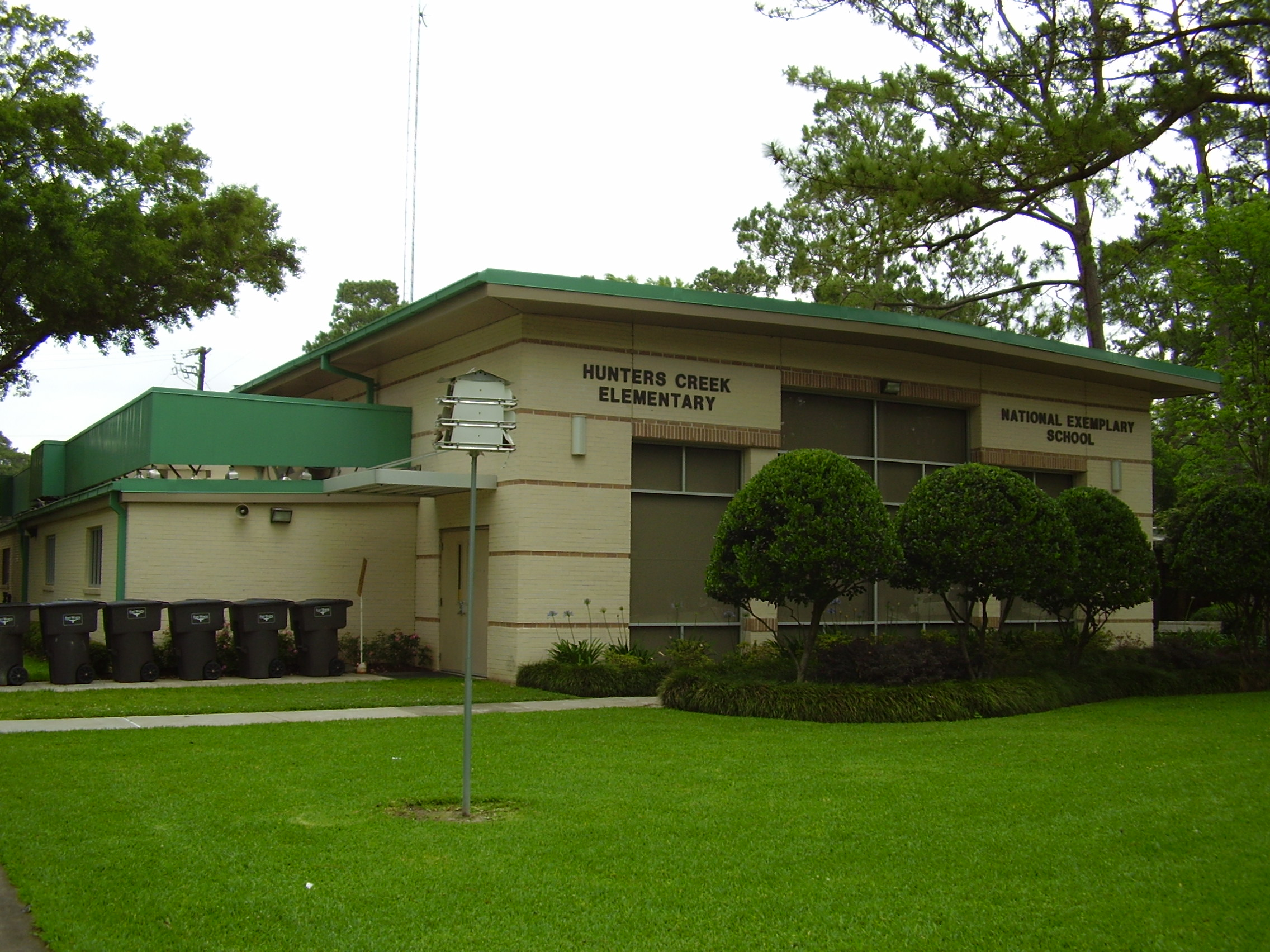
Hunters Creek Elementary School

=== Primary and secondary schools ===
==== Public schools ====
Hunters Creek Village is located within two school districts, the Spring Branch Independent School District and, solely as to residences to the south of the Buffalo Bayou, the Houston Independent School District.

===== Spring Branch Independent School District =====
Most of Hunters Creek Village is north of the Buffalo Bayou; that portion is served by the Spring Branch Independent School District.

All residents are assigned to Wildcat Way School in Houston for preschool.

One school, Hunters Creek Elementary School, is within the city boundaries. Most residents are zoned to Hunters Creek; some are zoned to Memorial Drive Elementary School in Piney Point Village. In 1954 the current Hunters Creek school opened. The district opened a new school building in August 2021.

Students in Hunters Creek and in Memorial Drive Elementary all are zoned to Spring Branch Middle School and Memorial High School, which are in Hedwig Village.

===== Houston Independent School District =====
The portion south of the Buffalo Bayou is served by the Houston Independent School District.

HISD students are zoned to Briargrove Elementary School, Tanglewood Middle School (formerly Grady Middle School), and Margaret Long Wisdom High School (formerly Robert E. Lee High School) (students may attend Lamar High School or Westside High School instead). Residents of the Briargrove Elementary School attendance zone may apply for the Briarmeadow Charter School. Mark White Elementary School are scheduled to open in August 2016. Residents of the Briargrove Elementary zone, along with those of the Pilgrim, Piney Point, and Emerson zones, will be allowed to apply to this school.

When Westside opened in 2000, residents of the Lee attendance boundary gained the option to attend Westside instead of Lee, with taxpayer subsidized transportation provided.

==== Private schools ====
Trinity Classical School has its middle school in the Memorial Middle Campus in the Chinese Baptist Church in Hunters Creek Village

=== Colleges and universities ===
Both Spring Branch ISD and Houston ISD (and therefore the whole city of Hunters Creek Village) are served by the Houston Community College System. The Northwest College operates the nearby Spring Branch Campus in Houston.

=== Public libraries ===
The city is served by the Spring Branch Memorial Branch of Harris County Public Library (the Spring Branch Memorial Branch is in Hedwig Village).

== Media ==
The Houston Chronicle is the area regional newspaper.

The Memorial Examiner is a local newspaper distributed in the community .

== Postal services ==
Most of Hunters Creek Village is within the 77024 ZIP code, while the section south of the Buffalo Bayou has the 77063 ZIP code.

The United States Postal Service location serving 77024 is the Memorial Park Post Office at 10505 Town and Country Way, Houston, Texas, 77024-9998.

The location serving 77063 is the John Dunlop Post Office at 8728 Beverlyhill Street, Houston, Texas, 77063-9998.

== Gallery ==
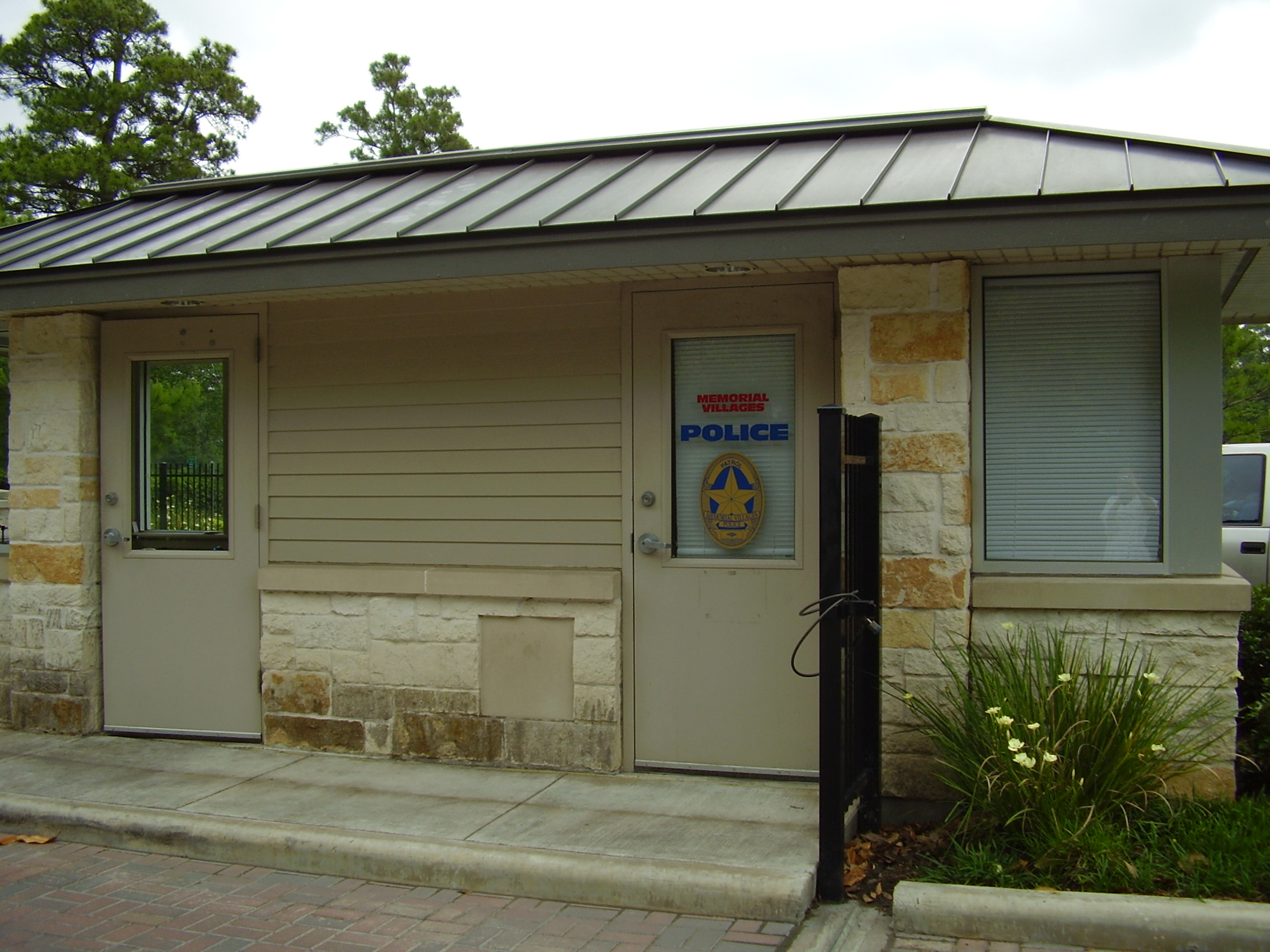
Police box in Hunters Creek Village

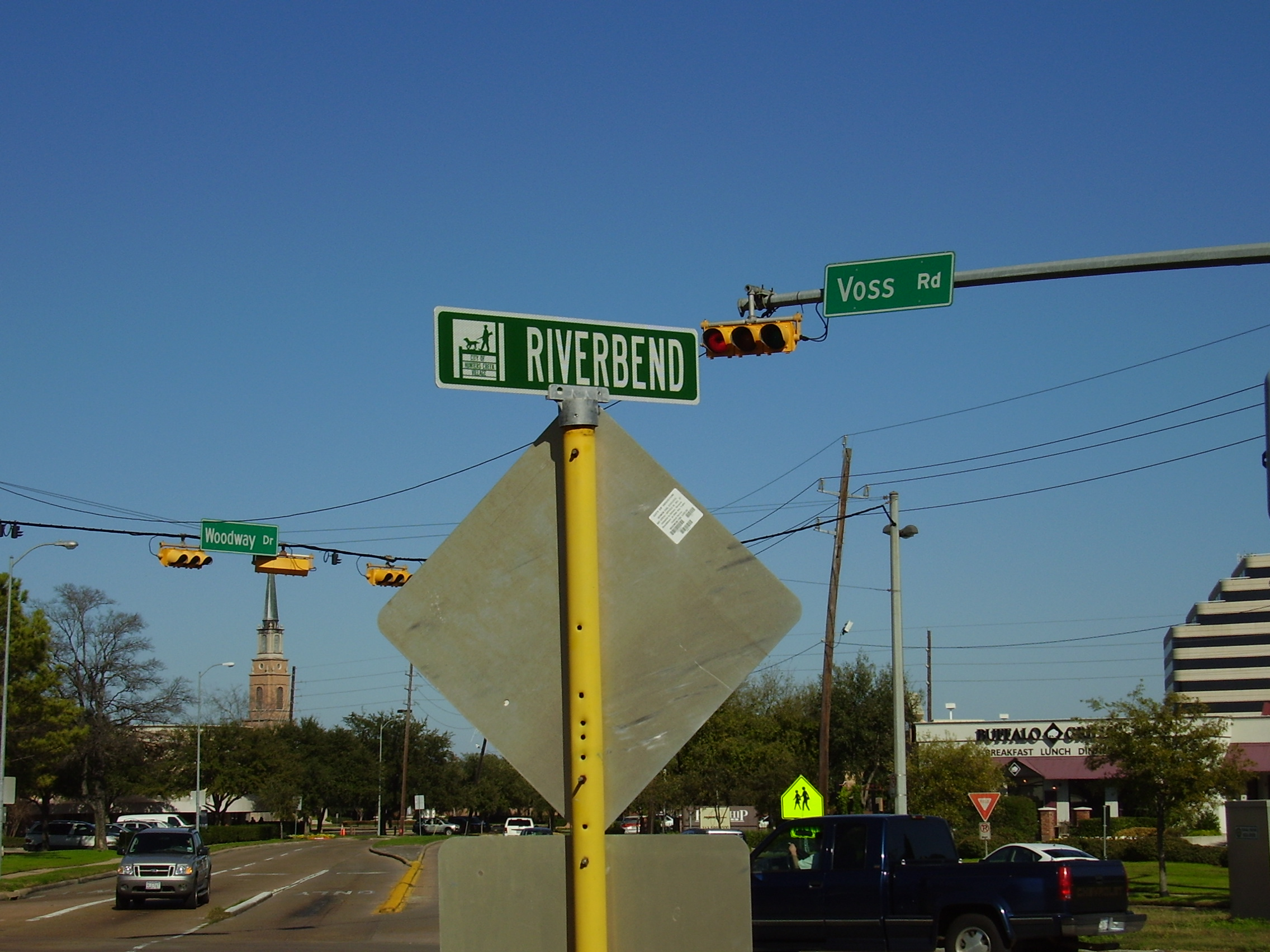
A street sign in Hunters Creek Village

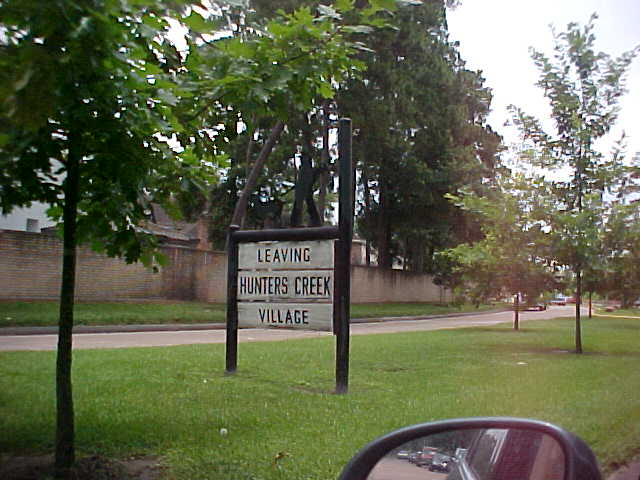
Leaving Hunters Creek Village

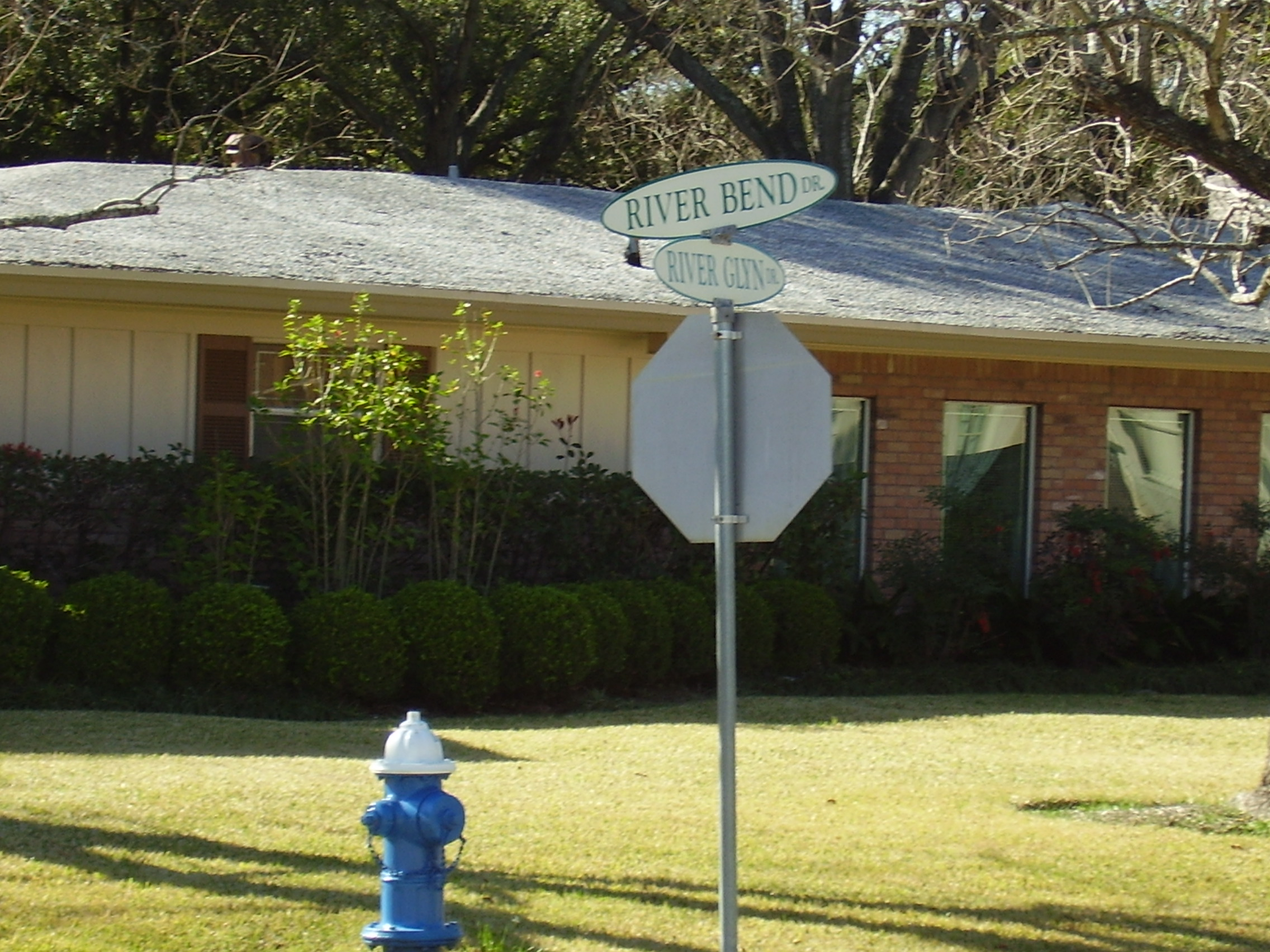
A house in Hunters Creek Village along with another style street sign
