= Trinity Classical School =

Coordinates: 29.756944°N 95.481732°W

Trinity Classical School of Houston
- Houston, TX; United States

Information
- Type: Private
- Motto: Ambulare in sapientia Dei
- Religious affiliations: Christian, non-denominational
- Established: 2009
- Head of School: Neil Anderson
- Faculty: 100+
- Enrollment: 800+
- Student to teacher ratio: 9:1 (Upper School)
- Campus: Urban
- Colors: Navy Blue and White
- Mascot: Owls
- Website: www.tcshouston.org

Trinity Classical School is a private, classical Christian school offering college-preparatory, Christian education for grades pre-Kindergarten through 12th grade in Houston, Texas. The school uses a nontraditional, hybrid education model, also called "collaborative model" or "blended model."

Trinity Classical School is an accredited member of the Society for Classical Learning. The school has also been a member of the Association of Classical and Christian Schools, the Classical Latin School Association, and the National Association of University-Model Schools. The school offers a classical curriculum and students attend classes on campus two days per week, with instruction continuing at home on the other three days of the week. Students are able to participate in fine arts electives, classes in Latin and Greek, as well as intramural and interscholastic competitions. The school's hybrid model of education combines aspects of private and home schooling.

Trinity Classical School is a non-profit organization and has received 501(c)(3) designation. Tuition for the 2026–27 school year for all grades is $2,834 per semester ($5,668 per year). Books and tuition are purchased separately. The school offers two types of scholarships: need-based and ministerial.

== Campuses ==
Trinity Classical School has four campus locations.

- Heights Lower Campus (PK-4th Grade) at Heights Church, 230 W. 20th Street, Houston, TX 77008
- Memorial Lower Campus (PK-4th Grade) at Bethel Church, 825 Bering Drive, Houston, TX 77057
- Memorial Middle Campus (5th-8th Grade) at Chinese Baptist Church 900 Brogden Road, Houston, TX 77024 (Hunters Creek Village)
- Memorial Upper Campus (9th-12th Grade) at Faith Center Spring Branch, 8009 Long Point Road, Houston, TX 77055

== Academics ==
The Classical Core is the fundamental TCS academic offering consisting of language arts, history, science, math, music, and Latin. These integrated subjects are taught in a way that corresponds to the stages in the classical trivium (i.e., grammar, logic, and rhetoric).

A senior thesis is a requirement for graduation. Every 12th grade student researches, writes, revises, and submits a thesis that combines aspects of a classic text, Biblical truth, and modern-day relevance. Seniors present and defend their theses in April in front of a panel of judges.

Students in Grades 10-12 can receive dual credit for five courses (three Humanities and two Latin) through Houston Christian University. The Classic Learning Test is administered through Grade 8, and students in Grades 9-11 can take the PSAT. Upper school students may also take a variety of Advanced Placement (AP) tests, including Biology, Calculus AB, Calculus BC, Environmental Science, Latin, Physics 1, Physics C: Mechanics, and Statistics. Latin students take the Universal Latin Exam each year.

=== College Acceptances ===
TCS Students have been admitted to a wide range of colleges and universities including the following:

- National Private Research Universities
  - California Institute of Technology
  - Carnegie Mellon University
  - Rice University
  - Northeastern University
- National Public Research Universities
  - The University of Texas at Austin (Plan II Honors)
  - Texas A&M University (Honors)
  - University of Virginia (Jefferson Scholar)
  - Purdue University
  - Auburn University
  - University of Arkansas (Honors)
  - University of Colorado Boulder
- Private Liberal Arts & Faith-Based Colleges
  - Hillsdale College
  - Villanova University
  - Wheaton College
  - Pepperdine University
  - Baylor University (Honors)
  - Colorado Christian University
  - Grove City College
  - St. John’s College, Annapolis
  - Trinity University
  - Samford University (Honors)
  - Houston Christian University (Honors)
- Specialized Schools
  - Colorado School of Mines
  - Boston Conservatory at Berklee College of Music
- International Research Universities
  - Durham University (UK)

== Student life ==
=== Co-curricular activities ===
In the Primer, Grammar, and Logic years (Grades PreK through 8th) students participate in a range of activities to supplement and reinforce their on-campus and at-home studies. These activities include field trips, book parties, history and science presentations, and theater performances.

At the Logic and Rhetoric grade levels (Grades 5 through 12) students may choose to participate in the annual Poetry Slam, Music Night, and Noctua Poetica (an annual compilation of student poetry). For all Rhetoric School students (Grades 9 through 12), the schools sponsors the Trinity Ball, an annual formal dinner and dance.

=== House system ===
In 2013, TCS adopted a House System whereby each student in seventh grade and up is randomly placed into a House. Students are placed into one of four houses, each named for a notable Christian scientist: Maxwell, Kepler, Pascal, and Carver. Each house has its own crest, necktie colors, Latin motto, and traditions. Each house sponsors a school event or activity, including Pascal's Music Night, Kepler's Hoedown, Carver's Poetry Slam and Edible Book Festival, and Maxwell's student newspaper. Houses compete each year for the House Cup.

=== Communitas ===
The school sponsors an annual fall retreat for all house-level students (Grades 7 through 12). This overnight event features competitions, activities, and worship.

=== Athletics ===
==== Cross country ====
TCS sponsors a cross-country team, which is open to students in grades 5 and up. During the fall, the team competes in invitational meets across the Houston area. During the winter, the team trains for a half-marathon. In the spring, the team competes in 5K road races sponsored by Houston-area charities.

==== Ultimate Frisbee ====
The school sponsors intramural Ultimate Frisbee teams during the fall semester. Over several Fridays, the middle school and upper school teams for each house compete to win points toward the House Cup.

==== Club sports ====
Because of the school's nontraditional schedule (with two on-campus days, Monday and Wednesday) many students participant in competitive athletics as part of local, homeschool, or club teams. Student participation has included the following sports: volleyball, baseball, swimming, rugby, lacrosse, and basketball.

=== Fine Arts ===
Choir and choral instruction are included in the curriculum for all students. Each grade performs a choral selection twice each year at the closing Semester Celebrations in December and May. The school offers fine art classes for all grades, including a Fine Arts Primer in music and visual art for grades Pre-K and Kindergarten, theater and dramatic arts classes for grades 1 through 4, and a range of fine arts classes for Grades 5 and up. These classes include theater, drawing, journalism, poetry, photography, sculpture, and creative writing.

=== Rome trip ===
Juniors take a trip to Rome in the spring to investigate Roman culture, language, history, architecture, religion, and art. Students are guided by experienced faculty members.
