= North Carolina Science Olympiad =

North Carolina Science Olympiad (NCSO) is a nonprofit organization with the mission to attract and retain the pool of K–12 students entering science, technology, engineering, and mathematics (STEM) degrees and careers in North Carolina. It is a state chapter of Science Olympiad. Every year NCSO hosts tournaments on university, community college, and public school campuses across the state. These tournaments are rigorous academic interscholastic competitions that consist of a series of different hands-on, interactive, challenging and inquiry-based events that are well balanced between the various disciplines of biology, earth science, environmental science, chemistry, physics, engineering and technology. NCSO is housed at The Science House at NC State University.

== History ==
The first recorded Science Olympiad was held on Saturday, November 23, 1974, at St. Andrews Presbyterian College in Laurinburg, North Carolina. Dr. Donald Barnes and Dr. David Wetmore were the originators of this event. Fifteen schools from North and South Carolina participated in this event. This Olympiad was a day-long affair, with competitions and demonstrations for high school students in the areas of biology, chemistry, and physics. There were four event periods during this day, and each event period had one fun event (like beaker race or paper airplane), one demonstration (like glassblowing and holography), and one serious event (like periodic table quiz or Science Bowl). An article was published in the Journal of Chemical Education in January 1978 documenting the success of recruiting students through Science Olympiad. St. Andrews continues to host a Science Olympiad tournament to this day.

John C. "Jack" Cairns was a teacher at Dover High School in Delaware in the 1970s when he learned about Science Olympiad taking place in North Carolina. He shared this information with Dr. Douglas R. Macbeth, the Delaware State Science Supervisor. Cairns was appointed to a steering committee to organize the first Olympiad in Delaware which took place at Delaware State University in the Spring of 1977.

By 1982, word about Science Olympiad continued to spread, and caught the attention of Dr. Gerard Putz in Macomb County, Michigan. Putz invited Cairns to share the success of the Delaware Science Olympiad with Macomb County. As a result, Michigan hosted their first two tournaments in 1983 and 1984 while at the same time Delaware hosted eight similar tournaments. Putz and Cairns then decided to share the program with the rest of the nation.

Year	Division B Champions	Division B Runner-Up	Division C Champions	Division C Runner-Up	Host
1985	—N/a	—N/a	Page	—N/a	NC State University; Raleigh, North Carolina
1986	—N/a	—N/a	NCSSM	Northeast Guilford	NC State University; Raleigh, North Carolina
1987	Drexel	West Rowan	Chapel Hill	NCSSM	NC State University; Raleigh, North Carolina
1988	Drexel	—N/a	Chapel Hill	NCSSM	NC State University; Raleigh, North Carolina
1989	Drexel	—N/a	Chapel Hill	—N/a	NC State University; Raleigh, North Carolina
1990	Nash Central	—N/a	Page	Chapel Hill	NC State University; Raleigh, North Carolina
1991	Drexel	Liberty	NCSSM	—N/a	NC State University; Raleigh, North Carolina
1992	Liberty	Our Lady of Lourdes	NCSSM	Chapel Hill	NC State University; Raleigh, North Carolina
1993	Hillcrest	Our Lady of Lourdes	NCSSM	Garner	NC State University; Raleigh, North Carolina
1994	Our Lady of Lourdes	Greene	NCSSM	Garner	NC State University; Raleigh, North Carolina
1995	Arendell Parrott	Our Lady of Lourdes	Chapel Hill	NCSSM	NC State University; Raleigh, North Carolina
1996	Arendell Parrott	Our Lady of Lourdes	NCSSM	Chapel Hill	NC State University; Raleigh, North Carolina
1997	Arendell Parrott	Mendenhall	Chapel Hill	John T. Hoggard	NC State University; Raleigh, North Carolina
1998	Arendell Parrott	Our Lady of Lourdes	Chapel Hill	John T. Hoggard	NC State University; Raleigh, North Carolina
1999	Arendell Parrott	Toisnot	Enloe	John T. Hoggard	NC State University; Raleigh, North Carolina
2000	Arendell Parrott	R. Max Abbott	Enloe	John T. Hoggard	NC State University; Raleigh, North Carolina
2001	Arendell Parrott	Davidson IB	Grimsley	Southeast Raleigh	NC State University; Raleigh, North Carolina
2002	Arendell Parrott	Seventy-First	Grimsley	Durham Academy	NC State University; Raleigh, North Carolina
2003	Arendell Parrott	Seventy-First	Washington	Durham Academy	NC State University; Raleigh, North Carolina
2004	Arendell Parrott	Davidson IB	Raleigh Charter	Durham Academy	NC State University; Raleigh, North Carolina
2005	Davidson IB	Jay M. Robinson	Washington	Raleigh Charter	NC State University; Raleigh, North Carolina
2006	Davidson IB	Arendell Parrott	Washington	East Chapel Hill	NC State University; Raleigh, North Carolina
2007	Jay M. Robinson	Arendell Parrott	Raleigh Charter	Washington	NC State University; Raleigh, North Carolina
2008	Jay M. Robinson	Davidson IB	NCSSM	Raleigh Charter	NC State University; Raleigh, North Carolina
2009	Jay M. Robinson	Davidson IB	NCSSM	Raleigh Charter	NC State University; Raleigh, North Carolina
2010	Jay M. Robinson	Arendell Parrott	Raleigh Charter	NCSSM	NC State University; Raleigh, North Carolina
2011	Arendell Parrott	Piedmont IB	NCSSM	Raleigh Charter	NC State University; Raleigh, North Carolina
2012	Piedmont IB	Jay M. Robinson	NCSSM	Enloe	NC State University; Raleigh, North Carolina
2013	Fred J. Carnage	Piedmont IB	Raleigh Charter	Enloe	NC State University; Raleigh, North Carolina
2014	Piedmont IB	Jay M. Robinson	Enloe	Raleigh Charter	NC State University; Raleigh, North Carolina
2015	Piedmont IB	J. M. Alexander	Enloe	NCSSM	NC State University; Raleigh, North Carolina
2016	Piedmont IB	Fred J. Carnage	Enloe	NCSSM	NC State University; Raleigh, North Carolina
2017	Piedmont IB	Fred J. Carnage	NCSSM	Enloe	NC State University; Raleigh, North Carolina
2018	Piedmont IB	Fred J. Carnage	Enloe	Raleigh Charter	NC State University; Raleigh, North Carolina
2019	Piedmont IB	Wilmington (WAAS)	NCSSM	Enloe	NC State University; Raleigh, North Carolina
2020	Cancelled due to the COVID-19 pandemic.				NC State University; Raleigh, North Carolina
2021 (Note: Competition was hosted by NC State University but held virtually.)	Piedmont IB	Fred J. Carnage	Enloe	NCSSM	NC State University; Raleigh, North Carolina
2022	Fred J. Carnage	Wilmington (WAAS)	NCSSM	Enloe	NC State University; Raleigh, North Carolina
2023	Piedmont IB	Fred J. Carnage	Enloe	NCSSM	NC State University; Raleigh, North Carolina
2024	Jay M. Robinson	Piedmont IB	Enloe	NCSSM	NC State University; Raleigh, North Carolina
2025	Piedmont IB	Fred J. Carnage	NCSSM	Enloe	NC State University; Raleigh, North Carolina

== Competition ==
- Score is calculated by giving 1 point for a first-place finish, 2 points for a second-place finish, etc.
- In final events standings, (D) denotes defending champions.

NCSO competitions are run in a style similar to a track meet. Each competitor has individual events that they compete in, instead of shot put and javelin, a competitor would participate in Forensics and Tower Building. Competitors receive individual rankings in each individual event they compete in, and at the end of the day all the individual event rankings are added together to get the total Team Score. Competitors are able to earn medals in their individual events, and teams can also win an overall trophy for their school.

Science Olympiad tournaments have four different time periods (and walk-in time periods) when events are held. Due to the number of teams at the state tournament (118 division C teams at the 2015 tournament), the events are instead divided into six time periods of 70 minutes. Most events allow teams of two students to compete (some events allow three).

Regional Tournament host sites include Campbell University, Catawba Valley Community College, Cumberland County Schools, East Carolina University, Fayetteville Technical Community College, Green Hope High School, Guilford County Schools, Lenoir Community College, Lenoir-Rhyne University, St. Andrews University, New Hanover County Schools, Raleigh Charter High School, UNC-Asheville, UNC-Charlotte, UNC-Greensboro, and UNC-Wilmington. The North Carolina State Tournament is hosted at NC State University each April. The top two scoring teams at the state level advance to the national competition, held every May. State tournament results are seen below.

=== 2021 Competition ===
Division B – event placement
Event	First place	Second place	Third place	Fourth Place
Anatomy and Physiology	Piedmont IB	Hope	Jay M. Robinson	Mills Park
Circuit Lab	Davis Drive	Jay M. Robinson	Fred J. Carnage	Smith
Codebusters	Piedmont IB	Davis Drive	Jay M. Robinson	Guy B. Phillips
Crime Busters	Piedmont IB	Wilmington	Hope	Triangle Day
Density Lab	Jay M. Robinson	Davis Drive	Piedmont IB	Fred J. Carnage
Digital Structures	Fred J. Carnage	Alston Ridge	Piedmont IB	Central Wilkes
Disease Detectives	Mills Park	Metrolina Regional	Fred J. Carnage	Piedmont IB
Dynamic Planet	Mills Park	Piedmont IB	Alston Ridge	Thales Academy
Experimental Design	Piedmont IB	Wilmington	Jay M. Robinson	Mills Park
Food Science	Davis Drive	Mills Park	Fred J. Carnage	Triangle Day
Fossils	Piedmont IB	Wilmington	Jay M. Robinson	Mills Park
Game On	Wilmington	Jay M. Robinson	Piedmont IB	Hope
Heredity	Fred J. Carnage	Piedmont IB	Oberlin Magnet	Lake Norman Charter
Machines	Davis Drive	Fred J. Carnage	Mills Park	Jay M. Robinson
Meteorology	Wilmington	Davis Drive	Wakefield	Piedmont IB
Mousetrap Vehicle	Mills Park	Thales Academy	Lake Norman Charter	Wakefield
Ornithology	Wilmington	Voyager Academy	Piedmont IB	Metrolina Regional
Picture This	Fred J. Carnage	Jay M. Robinson	Voyager Academy	Smith
Reach for the Stars	Piedmont IB	David Drive	Wilmington	The Academy at Lincoln
Road Scholar	Piedmont IB	Fred J. Carnage	Jay M. Robinson	Alston Ridge
Water Quality	Piedmont IB	Alston Ridge	Cornerstone Charter	Guy B. Phillips
Write It, Do It	The Academy at Lincoln	Wakefield	Providence Day	Voyager Academy
Winning team

Division B – final standings
Position	Team	Score
1	Piedmont IB (D)	85
2	Fred J. Carnage	125
3	Jay M. Robinson	158
4	Mills Park	160
5	Davis Drive	182
6	Wilmington	184
7	Smith	260
8	Metrolina Regional	265
9	Guy B. Phillips	283
10	The Academy at Lincoln	296
11	Triangle Day	308
12	Lake Norman Charter	310
13	Alston Ridge	314
14	Cornerstone Charter	343
15	Thales Academy	350
16	Hope	384
17	Oberlin Magnet	388
18	Voyager Academy	404
19	Wakefield	406
20	Community House	429
21	Central Wilkes	477
22	Woods Charter	487
23	Providence Day	493
24	Charles P. Murray	500
25	Seventy-First	511
26	Team JOCO	517
27	Roland Grise	528
28	Ayden	545
29	Foothills Community	564
30	Cannon School	573
31	French Broad River	579
32	Cleveland	620
33	Contentnea-Savannah	652
34	Woodington	661
35	Flat Rock	673

Division C – event placement
Event	First place	Second place	Third place	Fourth Place
Anatomy and Physiology	Enloe	NCSSM	Panther Creek	Isaac Bear
Astronomy	NCSSM	D.H. Conley	Chapel Hill	Enloe
Chem Lab	Raleigh Charter	Enloe	Green Hope	NCSSM
Circuit Lab	NCSSM	Enloe	Chapel Hill	Raleigh Charter
Codebusters	Enloe	Apex Friendship	Weddington	Triangle Academy
Designer Genes	Enloe	NCSSM	D.H. Conley	Green Hope
Digital Structures	Enloe	Raleigh Charter	Northside - Onslow	Panther Creek
Disease Detectives	Panther Creek	Green Level	Cary Academy	John T. Hoggard
Dynamic Planet	NCSSM	Enloe	John T. Hoggard	Raleigh Charter
Experimental Design	Green Level	Enloe	Panther Creek	Raleigh Charter
Fermi Questions	Triangle Academy	East Chapel Hill	Panther Creek	Isaac Bear
Forensics	Enloe	Pather Creek	Chapel Hill	Isaac Bear
Fossils	NCSSM	Enloe	Northern Guilford	Middle Creek
GeoLogic Mapping	NCSSM	Research Triangle	Cardinal Gibbons	Enloe
Gravity Vehicle	John T. Hoggard	E.A. Laney	Research Triangle	Enloe
Machines	Enloe	NCSSM	Green Hope	Chapel Hill
Ornithology	Middle Creek	Northern Guilford	Enloe	Ardrey Kell
Picture This	Enloe	East Chapel Hill	NCSSM	E.A. Laney
Protein Modeling	Green Hope	Enloe	Panther Creek	Raleigh Charter
Sounds of Music	NCSSM	Green Hope	East Chapel Hill	Raleigh Charter
Water Quality	Triangle Academy	D.H. Conley	NCSSM	Enloe
Write It Do It	East Chapel Hill	Providence	Marvin Ridge	Durham Academy
Winning team

Division C – final standings
Position	Team	Score
1	Enloe	62
2	NCSSM (D)	119
3	Green Hope	205
4	Raleigh Charter	257
5	Panther Creek	265
6	Chapel Hill	286
7	John T. Hoggard	328
8	Isaac Bear	349
9	East Chapel Hill	378
10	Triangle Academy	381
11	Green Level	396
12	The Early College	421
13	Cary Academy	440
14	Marvin Ridge	476
15	Northern Guilford	481
16	Mallard Creek	495
17	Atkins	497
18	Ardrey Kell	499
19	E.A. Laney	523
20	Apex Friendship	526
21	Providence	563
22	Durham Academy	565
23	Woods Charter	582
24	Apex	598
25	Middle Creek	607
26	Henderson County	622
27	Greensboro Day	631
28	Weddington	634
29	Research Triangle	643
30	Thomas Jefferson	645
31	Cardinal Gibbons	655
32	Cedar Ridge	664
33	Thales Academy	680
34	Martin L. Nesbitt	689
35	Providence Day	693
36	Charlotte Catholic	743
37	The O'Neal School	743
38	Cross Creek	745
39	D.H. Conley	755
40	Holly Springs	757
41	Heritage	780
42	Topsail	782
43	Early College of Forsyth	792
44	Cary	798
45	Northside - Onslow	816
46	Eugene Ashley	818
47	Pinecrest	820
48	Franklin Academy	820
49	West Henderson	852
50	Roanoke Rapids	920
51	St. John Paul II	942
52	McDowell	944
53	Coastal Christian	965

=== 2019 Competition ===
Division B – event placement
Event	First place	Second place	Third place	Fourth Place
Amazing Mechatronics	Bull City Homeschoolers	Jay M. Robinson	Martin	Academicians
Anatomy and Physiology	Piedmont IB	Jay M. Robinson	Fred J. Carnage	Davis Drive
Battery Buggy	Wilmington	Academicians	St. Michael	Davis Drive
Boomilever	Bull City Homeschoolers	Piedmont IB	Wilmington	Jay M. Robinson
Circuit Lab	West Cary	DaVinci's Dragons	Fred J. Carnage	Davis Drive
Crime Busters	Arendell Parrott	Piedmont IB	Daniels Magnet	Jay M. Robinson
Density Lab	Jay M. Robinson	Piedmont IB	Davis Drive	Fred J. Carnage
Disease Detectives	West Cary	Jay M. Robinson	Mills Park	Piedmont IB
Duct Tape Challenge	Bull City Homeschoolers	Topsail	Academicians	Pine Lake Preparatory
Dynamic Planet	Wilmington	Piedmont IB	Jay M. Robinson	The Academy at Lincoln
Elastic Launch Glider	Polk County	DaVinci's Dragons	Infant of Prague	Central Wilkes
Experimental Design	Davis Drive	West Cary	Mills Park	Smith
Fossils	Piedmont IB	Surf City	Guy B. Phillips	Jay M. Robinson
Heredity	Thales Academy	Randolph	West Cary	Piedmont IB
Herpetology	Piedmont IB	Jay M. Robinson	The Academy at Lincoln	Moyock
Meteorology	West Cary	Wilmington	Jay M. Robinson	Piedmont IB
Ping Pong Parachute	Wilmington	Piedmont IB	Fairview	Fred J. Carnage
Potions and Poisons	Davis Drive	St. Michael	Randolph	Fred J. Carnage
Road Scholar	Daniels Magnet	Davis Drive	Academicians	Mills Park
Roller Coaster	Fred J. Carnage	Piedmont IB	Wilmington	Bull City Homeschoolers
Solar System	Hope	Piedmont IB	Fred J. Carnage	Smith
Thermodynamics	Piedmont IB	Jay M. Robinson	Martin	Randolph
Water Quality	Jay M. Robinson	Hope	Wilmington	The Academy at Lincoln
Write It Do It	Piedmont IB	West Lincoln	Topsail	Jay M. Robinson
Winning team

Division B – final standings
Position	Team	Score
1	Piedmont IB (D)	102
2	Wilmington	168
3	Jay M. Robinson	194
4	Fred J. Carnage	249
5	Davis Drive	273
6	Smith	303
7	The Academy at Lincoln	372
8	Mills Park	398
9	West Cary	427
10	Randolph	467
11	Fairview	473
12	St. Mary	487
13	Daniels Magnet	495
14	Community House	531
15	Bull City Homeschoolers	540
16	Academicians	540
17	St. Mark	544
18	Hope	550
19	Guy B. Phillips	569
20	Roland Grise	575
21	Arendell Parrott	591
22	Saint Mary Magdalene	610
23	Topsail	614
24	MCS Noble	616
25	Seventy-First	626
26	Martin	631
27	DaVinci's Dragons	639
28	First Impressions	650
29	Woods Charter	653
30	Cathedral School	664
31	St. Michael	668
32	The Epiphany School	677
33	St. John Paul II	695
34	Thales Academy	735
35	Triangle Day	743
36	Surf City	773
37	Polk County	789
38	The Oakwood School	791
39	Western Harnett	814
40	Infant of Prague	828
41	Holly Grove	858
42	Moyock	863
43	Pine Lake Preparatory	874
44	West Lincoln	882
45	Bath	884
46	Belmont	908
47	Central Wilkes	929
48	Morganton	943
49	Mill Creek	945
50	St. Peter	946
51	Millennium Charter	994
52	Ranger	1006

Division C – event placement
Event	First place	Second place	Third place	Fourth Place
Anatomy and Physiology	Enloe	East Chapel Hill	Raleigh Charter	Jack Britt
Astronomy	Enloe	Ardrey Kell	Durham Academy	NCSSM
Boomilever	NCSSM	Raleigh Charter	North Mecklenburg	Henderson County
Chemistry Lab	Enloe	Atkins	Cary Academy	Isaac Bear
Circuit Lab	NCSSM	Enloe	Chapel Hill	Green Hope
Codebusters	NCSSM	Durham School	Enloe	Apex
Designer Genes	Enloe	North Lincoln	East Chapel Hill	NCSSM
Disease Detectives	North Mecklenburg	Providence	Panther Creek	Triangle Academy
Dynamic Planet	Durham Academy	NCSSM	Triangle Academy	Myers Park
Experimental Design	North Mecklenburg	Raleigh Charter	NCSSM	Enloe
Fermi Questions	Ardrey Kell	West Henderson	John T. Hoggard	NCSSM
Forensics	NCSSM	Atkins	Smoky Mountain	Enloe
Fossils	Green Hope	Science Sleuths	NCSSM	Enloe
GeoLogic Mapping	NCSSM	East Chapel Hill	North Mecklenburg	Apex
Herpetology	NCSSM	Enloe	DaVinci's Dragons	Green Hope
Mission Possible	Raleigh Charter	Enloe	Jack Britt	Cardinal Gibbons
Mousetrap Vehicle	Chapel Hill	Science Sleuths	Isaac Bear	NCSSM
Ping Pong Parachute	Northern Guilford	Wood Charter	East Chapel Hill	Science Sleuths
Protein Modeling	Enloe	Cardinal Gibbons	North Mecklenburg	Caldwell
Sounds of Music	Woods Charter	Panther Creek	Marvin Ridge	East Chapel Hill
Thermodynamics	Enloe	NCSSM	Raleigh Charter	John T. Hoggard
Water Quality	Triangle Academy	Enloe	NCSSM	Chapel Hill
Wright Stuff	NCSSM	North Mecklenburg	Middle Creek	Atkins
Write It Do It	Cardinal Gibbons	North Mecklenburg	John T. Hoggard	Enloe
Winning team

Division C – final standings
Position	Team	Score
1	NCSSM	143
2	Enloe (D)	144
3	Raleigh Charter	221
4	North Mecklenburg	287
5	East Chapel Hill	311
6	John T. Hoggard	389
7	Ardrey Kell	422
8	Chapel Hill	431
9	Panther Creek	456
10	Isaac Bear	470
11	Triangle Academy	475
12	Green Hope	488
13	Durham Academy	514
14	Caldwell	546
15	Woods Charter	550
16	Cardinal Gibbons	561
17	Apex	572
18	Atkins	576
19	Jack Britt	582
20	West Henderson	583
21	Cary Academy	584
22	Mallard Creek	588
23	Myers Park	593
24	Northern Guilford	599
25	Smoky Mountain	604
26	Marvin Ridge	606
27	The Epiphany School	620
28	The Early College	627
29	Science Sleuths	629
30	Durham School	633
31	DaVinci's Dragons	646
32	Junius H. Rose	651
33	E.A. Laney	674
34	D.H. Conley	688
35	Middle Creek	689
36	C.E. Jordan	726
37	Research Triangle	756
38	South Point	777
39	Henderson County	778
40	Cedar Ridge	781
41	North Lincoln	793
42	Providence	810
43	Terry Sanford	821
44	Northside - Onslow	829
45	The Oakwood School	830
46	Cross Creek	885
47	Onslow	887
48	Southern Nash	893
49	Northside - Beaufort	917
50	Massey Hill	1022

=== 2018 Competition ===
Division B – event placement
Event	First place	Second place	Third place	Fourth Place
Anatomy and Physiology	Jay M. Robinson	Metrolinia Regional	Fred J. Carnage	Piedmont IB
Battery Buggy	Bath	Wilmington	Smith	Woods Charter
Crime Busters	Roland Grise	Smith	St. Mary	Wilmington
Disease Detectives	Mills Park	Randolph	Smith	Davis Drive
Duct Tape Challenge	Seventy-First	Fred J. Carnage	Topsail	Parkwood
Dynamic Planet	Piedmont IB	Woodlawn	Mills Park	Jay M. Robinson
Ecology	Hope	Piedmont IB	Davis Drive	Sun Valley
Experimental Design	Smith	Fred J. Carnage	Piedmont IB	Mills Park
Fast Facts	Mills Park	Fred J. Carnage	Piedmont IB	Davis Drive
Herpetology	Mills Park	St. Mary	MCS Noble	Guy B. Phillips
Hovercraft	Piedmont IB	Wilmington	Thomas Jefferson	St. Mary
Meteorology	Wilmington	Fred J. Carnage	Roland Grise	Woodlawn
Microbe Mission	Daniels Magnet	Davis Drive	Jay M. Robinson	Wilmington
Optics	Jay M. Robinson	Piedmont IB	DaVinci's Dragons	Parkwood
Ping Pong Parachute	Piedmont IB	Guy B. Phillips	Randolph	Science Hounds
Potions and Poisons	Davis Drive	Mills Park	Woodlawn	Wilmington
Road Scholar	Fred J. Carnage	Woodlawn	Science Hounds	Smith
Rocks and Minerals	Piedmont IB	St. Mary	Davis Drive	Fairview
Roller Coaster	Wilmington	The Exploris School	Mills Park	Jay M. Robinson
Solar System	Wilmington	Davis Drive	Mills Park	Smith
Thermodynamics	Davis Drive	Randolph	Piedmont IB	Jay M. Robinson
Towers	Piedmont IB	Bull City Homeschoolers	Wilmington	Science Hounds
Wright Stuff	Piedmont IB	Thomas Jefferson	Murray	Polk County
Write It Do It	Mills Park	St. Michael	Triangle Academy	Smith
Winning team

Division B – final standings
Position	Team	Score
1	Piedmont IB (D)	146
2	Fred J. Carnage	194
3	Wilmington	245
4	Mills Park	272
5	Smith	273
6	Davis Drive	285
7	Jay M. Robinson	335
8	Metrolinia Regional	421
9	Woodlawn	424
10	Guy B. Phillips	484
11	St. Mary	500
12	Thomas Jefferson	527
13	Randolph	541
14	Daniels Magnet	557
15	MCS Noble	558
16	Triangle Academy	560
17	The Epiphany School	565
18	Hope	587
19	Holly Grove	598
20	Charlotte Country Day	602
21	St. Michael	607
22	Roland Grise	619
23	Bull City Homeschoolers	627
24	St. John Paul II	655
25	Durham Academy	661
26	Parkwood	663
27	Wakefield	667
28	Science Hounds	683
29	Fairview	686
30	Topsail	699
31	Seventy-First	710
32	Thales Academy	724
33	The Exploris School	729
34	Cathedral School	741
35	The Oakwood School	743
36	DaVinci's Dragons	758
37	Woods Charter	759
38	Murray	762
39	The O'Neal School	772
40	Arendell Parrott	796
41	Polk County	800
42	Voyager Academy	803
43	Cornerstone Charter	812
44	Bath	819
45	Pine Forest	830
46	Sun Valley	852
47	Mill Creek	868
48	St. Peter	914
49	North Davie	919
50	STORM	936
51	Martins Creek	936
52	NCLA	1006

Division C – event placement
Event	First place	Second place	Third place	Fourth Place
Amazing Mechatronics	The Early College	West Henderson	Carrboro	Raleigh Charter
Anatomy and Physiology	Enloe	Green Hope	Athens Drive	NCSSM
Astronomy	Enloe	Raleigh Charter	East Chapel Hill	Durham Academy
Chemistry Lab	Enloe	Green Hope	NCSSM	Ardrey Kell
Codebusters	NCSSM	Enloe	Durham School	Cardinal Gibbons
Disease Detectives	Raleigh Charter	North Mecklenburg	Enloe	Ardrey Kell
Dynamic Planet	Enloe	Isaac Bear	John T. Hoggard	E.A. Laney
Ecology	East Chapel Hill	Durham School	Ardrey Kell	Green Hope
Experimental Design	North Mecklenburg	NCSSM	Enloe	Apex
Forensics	Enloe	Ardrey Kell	Providence	Cardinal Gibbons
Helicopters	Enloe	North Mecklenburg	Smoky Mountain	Raleigh Charter
Herpetology	Enloe	Green Hope	Caldwell	DaVinci's Dragons
Hovercraft	NCSSM	DaVinci's Dragons	North Mecklenburg	John T. Hoggard
Materials Science	Enloe	Ardrey Kell	North Mecklenburg	NCSSM
Microbe Mission	Raleigh Charter	Enloe	NCSSM	Ardrey Kell
Mission Possible	Enloe	Jack Britt	Raleigh Charter	North Mecklenburg
Mousetrap Vehicle	E.A. Laney	Isaac Bear	Enloe	NCSSM
Optics	NCSSM	Enloe	East Chapel Hill	Providence
Ping Pong Parachute	Raleigh Charter	North Mecklenburg	Chapel Hill	Ardrey Kell
Remote Sensing	Enloe	Raleigh Charter	Ardrey Kell	North Mecklenburg
Rocks and Minerals	NCSSM	Enloe	North Mecklenburg	E.A. Laney
Thermodynamics	Enloe	West Henderson	Green Hope	NCSSM
Towers	Myers Park	North Mecklenburg	Chapel Hill	Ardrey Kell
Write It Do It	Northern Guilford	Raleigh Charter	Apex	Athens Drive
Winning team

Division C – final standings
Position	Team	Score
1	Enloe	86
2	Raleigh Charter	222
3	NCSSM (D)	247
4	North Mecklenburg	248
5	Ardrey Kell	303
6	John T. Hoggard	318
7	Cardinal Gibbons	390
8	Green Hope	419
9	East Chapel Hill	443
10	Atkins	459
11	Apex	461
12	Myers Park	465
13	Jack Britt	496
14	Isaac Bear	510
15	E.A. Laney	514
16	Marvin Ridge	521
17	Chapel Hill	539
18	Smokey Mountain	542
19	Northern Guilford	554
20	Durham Academy	570
21	West Henderson	573
22	Providence	580
23	Wake	586
24	The Early College	597
25	Woods Charter	610
26	Panther Creek	615
27	Athens Drive	654
28	DaVinci's Dragons	665
29	St. Stephens	666
30	Durham School	683
31	The Epiphany School	684
32	Northwood	685
33	Eugene Ashley	688
34	North Lincoln	693
35	Polk County	718
36	Carrboro	727
37	Henderson County	736
38	Cedar Ridge	749
39	Caldwell	772
40	Pine Lake Preparatory	795
41	Northside	797
42	Terry Sanford	802
43	Junius H. Rose	818
44	Currituck County	859
45	Cross Creek	878
46	Cape Hatteras	898
47	Cape Fear	981
48	Harrells Christian	1018
49	Clinton	1032
50	Discovery	1057
51	Roanoke Rapids	1099

=== 2017 Competition ===
Division B – event placement
Event	First place	Second place	Third place	Fourth Place
Anatomy and Physiology	Seventy-First	Jay M. Robinson	Piedmont IB	Davis Drive
Bottle Rocket	Wilmington	Piedmont IB	Belmont	Jay M. Robinson
Crime Busters	Piedmont IB	Fairview	Davis Drive	Fred J. Carnage
Disease Detectives	Piedmont IB	J.M. Alexander	Woods Charter	St. Mary
Duct Tape Challenge	Myrtle Grove	Murray	Woodlawn	Arendell Parrott
Dynamic Planet	Randolph	Piedmont IB	Woodlawn	Guy B. Phillips
Ecology	Fred J. Carnage	St. Mary	Piedmont IB	Fairview
Experimental Design	Piedmont IB	Fred J. Carnage	J.M. Alexander	Community House
Fast Facts	Piedmont IB	Fred J. Carnage	Jay M. Robinson	Community House
Food Science	Piedmont IB	Jay M. Robinson	Smith	Thales Academy
Hovercraft	Piedmont IB	Cathedral School	R. Max Abbott	Fairview
Invasive Species	Fred J. Carnage	Jay M. Robinson	Piedmont IB	J.M. Alexander
Meteorology	MCS Noble	Apex	Woodlawn	Jay M. Robinson
Microbe Mission	Fred J. Carnage	Randolph	The Oakwood School	Seventy-First
Mission Possible	Piedmont IB	Wilmington	Fred J. Carnage	Jay M. Robinson
Optics	Jay M. Robinson	Mills Park	Piedmont IB	Fairview
Reach for the Stars	Randolph	Jay M. Robinson	Mount Mourne	Piedmont IB
Road Scholar	Guy B. Phillips	Piedmont IB	Smith	Fred J. Carnage
Rocks and Minerals	Piedmont IB	Jay M. Robinson	St. Mary	Parkwood
Scrambler	Wilmington	Eno River	Fairview	Woodlawn
Towers	Piedmont IB	Jay M. Robinson	Wilmington	Smith
Wind Power	Piedmont IB	Randolph	Jay M. Robinson	Fairview
Wright Stuff	Piedmont IB	Mount Mourne	Mill Creek	Murray
Write It Do It	Wilmington	Piedmont IB	Mills Park	MCS Noble
Winning team

Division B – final standings
Position	Team	Score
1	Piedmont IB (D)	106
2	Fred J. Carnage	195
3	Jay M. Robinson	223
4	Wilmington	231
5	Fairview	333
6	Mills Park	353
7	Guy B. Phillips	407
8	Smith	447
9	Jay M. Alexander	450
10	MCS Noble	456
11	Woodlawn	482
12	St. Mary	525
13	Randolph	535
14	Daniels Magnet	540
15	Triangle Academy	548
16	Woods Charter	558
17	Community House	559
18	Seventy-First	567
19	Arendell Parrott	572
20	Davis Drive	573
21	Thales Academy	575
22	Myrtle Grove	587
23	Apex	601
24	The Oakwood School	611
25	Mount Mourne	613
26	Cathedral School	627
27	Parkwood	638
28	Murray	644
29	Heritage	663
30	Cardinal Charter	680
31	Bull City Homeschoolers	681
32	The Epiphany School	692
33	Eno River	696
34	Voyager Academy	701
35	Polk County	706
36	Hope	713
37	Harry M. Arndt	723
38	Roland Grise	729
39	Thomas Jefferson	732
40	Sun Valley	768
41	Belmont	775
42	Cornerstone Charter	781
43	The O'Neal School	796
44	Holly Ridge	836
45	Avery	839
46	Mill Creek	843
47	R. Max Abbott	848
48	Central Wilkes	926
49	Cape Hatteras	961
50	Martins Creek	974

Division C – event placement
Event	First place	Second place	Third place	Fourth Place
Amazing Mechatronics	Smokey Mountain	Enloe	Raleigh Charter	Discovery
Anatomy and Physiology	Enloe	Ardrey Kell	Durham Academy	Raleigh Charter
Astronomy	Enloe	NCSSM	Apex	East Chapel Hill
Bottle Rocket	Mallard Creek	Ardrey Kell	Northern Guilford	North Mecklenburg
Chemistry Lab	Ardrey Kell	E.A. Laney	Enloe	Jack Britt
Codebusters	NCSSM	Pinecrest	Northwood	Jack Britt
Disease Detectives	NCSSM	Panther Creek	Apex	Durham Academy
Duct Tape Challenge	Enloe	E.A. Laney	NCSSM	North Mecklenburg
Dynamic Planet	NCSSM	Cape Fear	Cardinal Gibbons	Enloe
Ecology	NCSSM	North Mecklenburg	Atkins	West Johnston
Electric Vehicle	Discovery	Ardrey Kell	Northern Guilford	Wake Early College
Experimental Design	NCSSM	Enloe	Apex	North Mecklenburg
Forensics	Enloe	Ardrey Kell	Cardinal Gibbons	Raleigh Charter
Helicopters	North Mecklenburg	Enloe	Pinecrest	Raleigh Charter
Hovercraft	Chapel Hill	NCSSM	Isaac Bear	John T. Hoggard
Invasive Species	North Mecklenburg	Ardrey Kell	Northern Guilford	Enloe
Materials Science	NCSSM	Croatan	Smokey Mountain	Enloe
Microbe Mission	Enloe	Raleigh Charter	Marvin Ridge	NCSSM
Optics	NCSSM	Enloe	Voyager Academy	Panther Creek
Remote Sensing	Enloe	North Mecklenburg	NCSSM	Raleigh Charter
Rocks and Minerals	Enloe	Ardrey Kell	E.A. Laney	NCSSM
Towers	North Mecklenburg	NCSSM	Myers Park	Wake Early College
Wind Power	North Mecklenburg	Raleigh Charter	Smokey Mountain	Mallard Creek
Write It Do It	Panther Creek	Cape Fear	North Mecklenburg	D.H. Conley
Winning team

Division C – final standings
Position	Team	Score
1	NCSSM	187
2	Enloe (D)	196
3	North Mecklenburg	237
4	Ardrey Kell	297
5	Raleigh Charter	348
6	Cardinal Gibbons	379
7	John T. Hoggard	395
8	Northern Guilford	409
9	East Chapel Hill	418
10	Smokey Mountain	443
11	Durham Academy	451
12	Isaac Bear	461
13	Panther Creek	472
14	Pinecrest	489
15	Jack Britt	495
16	Northwood	504
17	Mallard Creek	515
18	Chapel Hill	515
19	Marvin Ridge	515
20	Apex	518
21	Wake Early College	567
22	E.A. Laney	593
23	Croatan	601
24	Cape Fear	623
25	Myers Park	644
26	Northern Guilford	645
27	The Early College	645
28	Atkins	657
29	McDowell	662
30	Voyager Academy	664
31	Polk County	671
32	Terry Sanford	683
33	Durham School	701
34	West Henderson	702
35	Discovery	715
36	West Johnston	728
37	Eugene Ashley	728
38	Junius H. Rose	739
39	Middle Creek	741
40	Northside (C16)	798
41	Pine Lake Preparatory	804
42	Millennium Charter	817
43	D.H. Conley	821
44	Harrells Christian	826
45	Northside (C46)	845
46	Fred T. Foard	848
47	The Oakwood School	868
48	Cape Hatteras	870
49	West Craven	999

== Events ==
The competitive events of NCSO align with the North Carolina Standard Course of Study as well as the National Science Education Standards. The events are designed to enhance and strengthen both science content and process skills. Every year NCSO replaces some of the events issued by the National Science Olympiad organization with events that are of local interest to North Carolina. The 18 elementary, 23 middle, and 23 high school events for each competitive year are announced in early Fall. This is followed by a series of workshops as competitors prepare for their events. Tournaments take place in the Spring, starting with school wide and Regional tournaments, advancing through State and National Tournaments. In the Summer camps are offered across North Carolina.

The 64 events of NCSO range from engineering events like Mystery Architecture, Towers and Helicopters to content events such as Microbe Mission, Forensics, and Ecology. The events change each year as new topics are rotated in and old topics rotate out, to ensure every part of curriculum is covered.

== Participation ==
In 2011, more than 600 K–12 schools representing over 10,000 students and 65 counties in North Carolina participated in North Carolina Science Olympiad activities.

Teams may be organized by any charter school, home school group, private or public school. Schools may have as many teams as they wish, the first team from a school is considered the Varsity team and all other teams are Junior Varsity teams. Teams are overseen by a coach.

== Divisions ==
Division A encompasses grades 3–6, Division B involves grades 6–9, and Division C involves grades 9–12. Teams at all three levels consist of eighteen competitors each in North Carolina.

The National tournament team consists of up to fifteen competitors.
