= Seventy-First Classical Middle School =

Historic school building in North Carolina, United States

Seventy-First Middle School
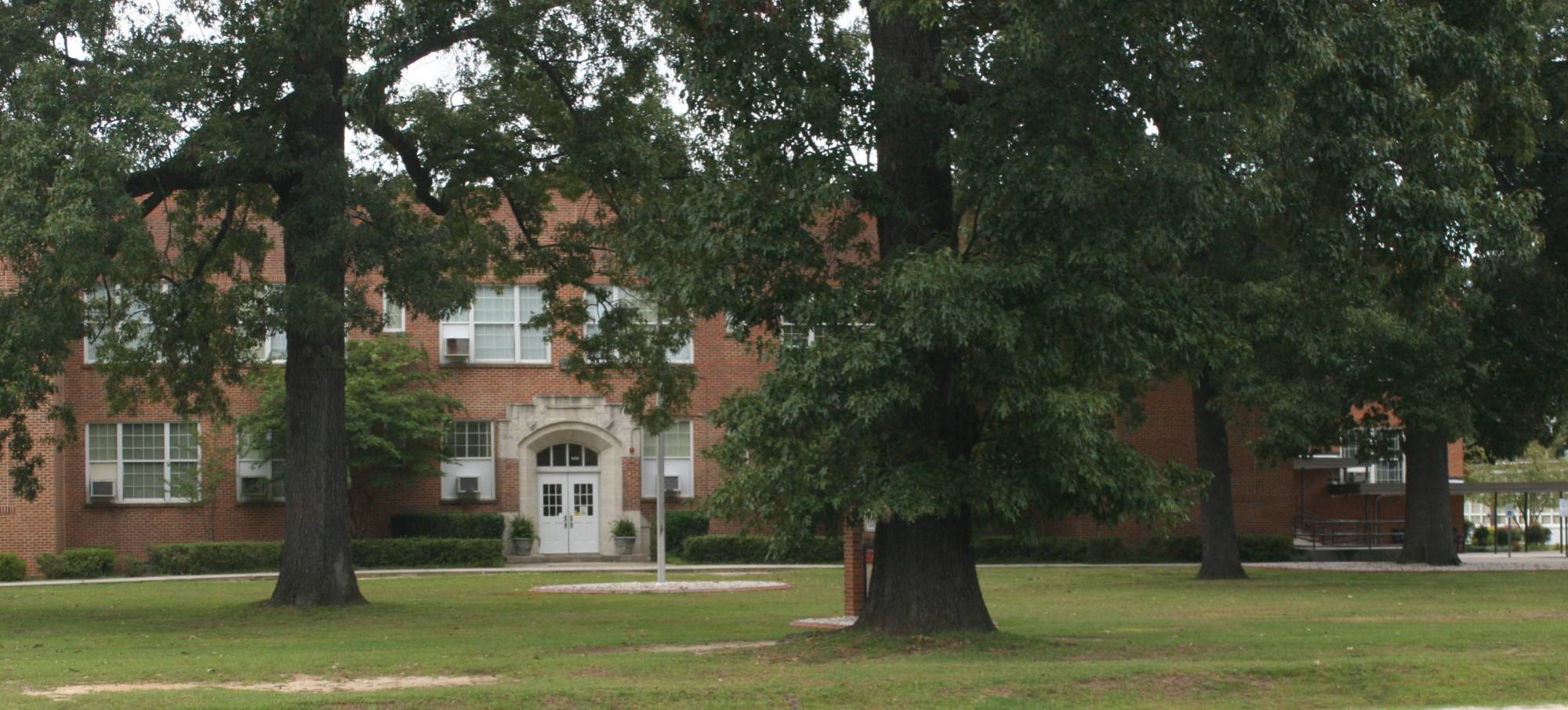
- Seventy-First Middle School, September 2014

Location
- 6830 Raeford Rd. Fayetteville, North Carolina; United States; 35.0380°N 79.0090°W

Information
- Type: Public
- Established: 1924
- Grades: 6–8
- Mascot: Knights
- Website: https://www.ccs.k12.nc.us/o/sfc
- Seventy-First Consolidated School
- U.S. National Register of Historic Places
- Area: 12 acres (4.9 ha)
- Built: 1924, 1938, 1949
- Architect: Stiles S. Dixon, William Deitrick
- Architectural style: Collegiate Gothic
- NRHP reference No.: 04001388
- Added to NRHP: December 23, 2004

Seventy-First Classical Middle School (SFCMS) is a middle school within the Cumberland County district. It is located at 6830 Raeford Road in Fayetteville, North Carolina. It serves students from grades 6 through 8. The school day begins at 7:30 a.m. and ends at 2:40 p.m. The school's current principal is Christin Etchison.

== History ==
The main building was constructed in 1924 and expanded in 1938 and 1949. It is a two-story, modified H-shaped Collegiate Gothic-style brick building with a nine-bay main block flanked by two one-bay projecting wings. The Seventy-First School was formed by the consolidation of six schools in the Seventy-First township: the McPherson, Glendale, Raymount, Kornbow, Westover and Galatia schools. These six schools were staffed by one to three teachers each. The two story brick school originally had 13 classrooms, an auditorium, and a privately managed lunch room. Five classrooms were used for high school work. The first year, the school had an enrollment of 367 pupils. It served as a high school from 1924 until 1962, when it was then converted to an elementary school. The building now serves as a middle school, with the name Seventy-First Classical Middle School.

The building was listed on the National Register of Historic Places in 2004 as the Seventy-First Consolidated School. The nomination also includes several contributing buildings: the gymnasium (1951), cafeteria / classroom building (1951–1952), portable classroom (1945), and athletic field (c. 1941).

== Core classes ==
SFCMS requires all students to take math, English, science, and social studies each year. Of these subjects, the only ones assessed through standardized testing are English and math (as well as science in eighth grade only), in accordance with North Carolina's standardized testing policy. English and math classes last for two periods, twice as long as science and social studies classes. (The total number of periods in the day is eight: two for English, two for Math, one for Science, one for Social Studies, and one for each of the two Electives.)

== Electives ==
Below is a list of all the Elective classes, also known as Essential classes, that were offered at SFCMS during the 2024–25 school year. Students are required to choose two Elective courses to take every year.

- Art
- Band
- Business and Entrepreneurship
- Chorus
- Coding
- Health and Physical Education
- Library Science
- Medical Science
- Orchestra
- Spanish
- STEM

== Clubs and activities ==
Below is a list of all the clubs and extracurricular activities offered at SFCMS during the 2024–25 school year.

- All County Band
- All County Orchestra
- Art Club
- Battle of the Books
- Beta Club
- Campus Life
- Classical Challenge Basketball Team (see Classical Challenge section)
- Dance Team
- Gaming Club
- Grooming Future Leaders
- Forensics
- MATHCOUNTS
- Pearls of Virtue
- Pep Squad
- Science Olympiad
- STARward STEM Design Challenge
- Student Government Association
- Word Power
- Yearbook Staff (see The Octagon section)

== Classical Challenge ==
The Classical Challenge is an annual basketball game between SFCMS and its fellow middle school, Reid Ross Classical, held in the spring. As SFCMS is a school of choice, it does not maintain a traditional interscholastic athletic program. The Classical Challenge is the only sporting event of the year for the school. SFCMS currently has a three-year winning streak in this competition, having won in 2023, 2024, and 2025.

== The Octagon ==
The SFCMS yearbook, aside from containing pictures of students and staff, often contains a brief explanation of the school's rich history, a shout-out to the Teacher of the Year and Beginning Teacher of the Year, a superlatives section, and even a poem about change and growth, written by the teachers.

SFCMS's yearbook staff is known as The Octagon.

== Dances ==
Dances are held approximately once every two months. They are most often held immediately after school in the gymnasium, and are sometimes themed. Dance tickets generally cost $5–10 (the proceeds sometimes go to the school and sometimes to charities, depending on the dance). The only exception is the Spring Formal, an annual prom-style dance usually held in early May. The Spring Formal is free, although only students with a clean behavioral record may attend. Recent themes for Spring Formals include Masquerade, Sneaker Ball, and Enchanted Garden.
