= Sacred Heart school =

Sacred Heart school may refer to any of numerous educational institutions, including:

== Tertiary education ==
- Sacred Heart University of Puerto Rico
- Sacred Heart University, Connecticut
- University of the Sacred Heart, Tokyo, Tokyo, Japan

== Primary and secondary education ==
=== Asia ===
==== Bahrain ====
- Sacred Heart School (Bahrain), Isa Town

==== India ====
- Sacred Heart Schools, Angadikadavu, Kerala
- Sacred Heart Boys High School, Mumbai
- Sacred Heart Convent School (Jamshedpur)
- Sacred Heart School, Golaghat

==== Japan ====
- International School of the Sacred Heart, Tokyo

==== Malaysia ====
- SMK Sacred Heart, Sibu (secondary school)
- Sacred Heart Primary School, Sibu
- Sacred Heart Primary School, Kota Kinabalu
- Sacred Heart Primary School, Sarawak
- Sacred Heart Primary School, Melaka

==== Pakistan ====
- Sacred Heart High School for Boys, Lahore
- Sacred Heart High School for Girls, Lahore

==== Philippines ====
- Sacred Heart School – Ateneo de Cebu, Cebu
- Sacred Heart School – Bauang La Union
- Sacred Heart of Jesus Catholic School, Santa Mesa, Manila
- Sacred Heart Academy of Santa Maria Bulacan, Santa Maria, Bulacan

==== Sri Lanka ====
- Sacred Heart Convent Galle

==== Taiwan ====
- Sacred Heart Girls High School (Taiwan)

==== Thailand ====
- Sacred Heart Convent School (Bangkok)

=== Australia ===
- Sacred Heart School, Launceston

=== Europe ===
==== England ====
- Sacred Heart School, Hove, Sussex, closed in 1966, the site is now Cardinal Newman Catholic School
- Beechwood Sacred Heart School, Tunbridge Wells, Kent
- Sacred Heart Language College, Harrow, London
- Sacred Heart Catholic School, Camberwell, London
- Sacred Heart Primary School, Teddington, London
- Sacred Heart Catholic High School, Crosby, Merseyside
- Sacred Heart Catholic Secondary, in Redcar, North Yorkshire
- Sacred Heart Catholic Voluntary Academy, Leicester

==== France ====
- Sacred Heart Elementary School (Paris)
- Free Institution of Sacred Heart (Institution Libre du Sacré-Cœur), Tourcoing

==== Northern Ireland ====
- Sacred Heart Grammar School, Newry, Co.Down, Northern Ireland

==== Scotland ====
- Kilgraston School, Bridge of Earn, Perthshire

==== Spain ====
- Sacred Heart School, Logroño

=== North America ===
==== Canada ====
- Sacred Heart School (Langton), Ontario
- Sacred Heart School of Halifax, Halifax, Nova Scotia

==== United States ====
- Sacred Heart of Jesus Catholic School (McClellan, Alabama)
- Sacred Heart Catholic School (Morrilton, Arkansas)
- Sacred Heart Schools, Atherton, California
- Sacred Heart School (Covina, California)
- Sacred Heart Cathedral Preparatory, San Francisco, California
- Sacred Heart School (Saratoga, California)
- Sacred Heart Schools (Chicago), Illinois
- Sacred Heart School (Lombard, Illinois)
- Sacred Heart School (Winnetka, Illinois)
- Sacred Heart School (Dubuque, Iowa)
- Sacred Heart School (Fall River, Massachusetts)
- Sacred Heart Schools (Kingston, Massachusetts)
- Sacred Heart Elementary School (Weymouth), Massachusetts
- Sacred Heart Catholic School (Hattiesburg, Mississippi)
- Sacred Heart School (Hampton, New Hampshire)
- Sacred Heart School (Mount Ephraim), New Jersey
- Sacred Heart School (Hartsdale), New York
- Sacred Heart School (Bethlehem), Pennsylvania
- Country Day School of the Sacred Heart, Bryn Mawr, Pennsylvania
- Sacred Heart Elementary (Carbondale), Pennsylvania
- Sacred Heart Catholic School (Muenster, Texas)

=== Africa ===
==== Ghana ====
- Sacred Heart Senior High School (Nsoatre)

== See also ==
- List of Schools of the Sacred Heart
- Sacred Heart (disambiguation)
- Sacred Heart Academy (disambiguation)
- Sacred Heart College (disambiguation)
- Sacred Heart High School (disambiguation)
- Convent of the Sacred Heart (disambiguation)
- Our Lady of the Sacred Heart (disambiguation)
- Sacred Heart Secondary School in Africa, South Africa, Kwazulu Natal, Verulam in OAKFORD near OAKFORD primary school (associated)but children coming from that primary school pay less than the children coming from other primaries in the earliest past Sacred heart secondary school was known for its education but now it has become less of inspiration it has changed even children are complaining people are hoping things would change it is also a boarding school for girls actually it is a school for girls.
