= Sacred Heart (disambiguation) =

The Sacred Heart is a Catholic devotion to the heart of Jesus Christ as a symbol of divine love and the source of the sacraments of the church.

Sacred Heart may also refer to:

== Churches and cathedrals ==
- Sacred Heart Cathedral (disambiguation)
- Sacred Heart Church (disambiguation)
- Basilica of the Sacred Heart of Jesus (Atlanta), Atlanta, Georgia

== Communities ==
In the United States:

- Sacred Heart, Minnesota
- Sacred Heart Township, Renville County, Minnesota
- Sacred Heart, Oklahoma

== Congregations and orders ==
=== Male ===
- Brothers of the Sacred Heart
- Congregation of the Sacred Hearts of Jesus and Mary, also called the Picpus fathers and sisters
- Dehonians, formally called Priests of the Sacred Heart of Jesus
- Missionaries of the Sacred Heart
- Society of Saint Joseph of the Sacred Heart (Josephites)

=== Female ===
- Society of the Sacred Heart (1800)
- Daughters of the Sacred Heart of Jesus (1831)
- Religious of the Sacred Heart of Mary (1849)
- Sisters of St Joseph of the Sacred Heart (1866)
- Oblates of the Heart of Jesus (1874), Louise-Thérèse de Montaignac de Chauvance
- Handmaids of the Sacred Heart of Jesus (1877)
- Daughters of the Sacred Heart (1903)
- Sisters of the Sacred Hearts of Jesus and Mary (1903)

== Medical institutions ==
- Sacred Heart Medical Center (disambiguation)
- Sacred Heart Hospital (disambiguation)

== Music and film ==
- Sacred Heart (film), the English name of the 2005 Italian language film Cuore Sacro
- Sacred Heart (Dio album)
- Sacred Heart (Peter Ostroushko album)
- Sacred Heart (Shakespears Sister album)
- "Sacred Heart", B-side of the 1981 Orchestral Manoeuvres in the Dark single "Souvenir"
- "Sacred Heart", original soundtrack of Ave Maryam

== Schools ==
- Sacred Heart Language College, London, England
- Sacred Heart Academy (disambiguation)
- Sacred Heart College (disambiguation)
- College of the Sacred Heart (disambiguation)
- Sacred Heart High School (disambiguation)
- Sacred Heart school (disambiguation)
- Convent of the Sacred Heart (disambiguation)
- Sacred Heart University, Fairfield, Connecticut
- Sacred Heart Apostolic School, Rolling Prairie, Indiana

== Fine Arts ==
- Sacred Heart of Jesus (Batoni), a 1767 painting of the Sacred Heart by Pompeo Batoni

== See also ==
- Feast of the Sacred Heart, a solemnity of the Roman Catholic church
- Our Lady of the Sacred Heart (disambiguation)
- Sacré Cœur (disambiguation), French for Sacred Heart
- Sacro Cuore (disambiguation), Italian for Sacred Heart
