= Sacred Heart High School =

Sacred Heart High School may refer to:

== Canada ==
- Sacred Heart High School (Ottawa), Ontario
- Sacred Heart Catholic High School (Newmarket), Newmarket, Ontario
- Sacred Heart Catholic High School (Walkerton), Walkerton, Ontario
- Sacred Heart High School (Yorkton), Saskatchewan

== Ghana ==
- Sacred Heart Senior High School (Nsoatre), Sunyani West District, Bono Region

== India ==
- Sacred Heart Boys High School, Mumbai, RSSFCS
- Sacred Heart High School (Sidhpur), Dharamshala
- Sacred Heart School, Golaghat
- Sacred Heart High School (Hyderabad), a school in Hyderabad
- Sacred Heart High School, Vashi, Navi Mumbai, RSCRWRFS
- Sacred Heart High School, Nala Sopara, Mumbai

== Pakistan ==
- Sacred Heart High School for Boys, Lahore
- Sacred Heart High School for Girls, Lahore

== Taiwan ==
- Keelung Fu Jen Sacred Heart Senior High School, Zhongshan District, Keelung

== England ==
- Sacred Heart Language College, Wealdstone, London
- Sacred Heart High School, Hammersmith, London
- Sacred Heart Catholic School, Camberwell, London
- Sacred Heart Catholic High School (Newcastle upon Tyne)
- Sacred Heart Catholic College or Sacred Heart Catholic High School, Crosby, Merseyside

== United States ==
- Sacred Heart High School (California), Los Angeles, California
- Sacred Heart High School (Connecticut), Waterbury, Connecticut
- Sacred Heart High School (Kansas), Salina, Kansas
- Sacred Heart Academy (Louisville), Kentucky
- Sacred Heart High School (Ville Platte, Louisiana)
- Sacred Heart High School (Kingston, Massachusetts)
- Sacred Heart High School (Roseville, Michigan)
- Sacred Heart High School (East Grand Forks, Minnesota)
- Sacred Heart High School (Hattiesburg, Mississippi)
- Sacred Heart High School (Missouri), Sedalia, Missouri
- Sacred Heart High School (Nebraska), Falls City, Nebraska
- Sacred Heart High School (New Jersey), Vineland, New Jersey
- Sacred Heart High School (Yonkers, New York)
- Sacred Heart High School (Pennsylvania), Carbondale, Pennsylvania
- Sacred Heart High School (Hallettsville, Texas), Michael, Rosinski
- Sacred Heart Catholic School (Muenster, Texas)

== See also ==
- Sacred Heart (disambiguation)
- Sacred Heart Academy (disambiguation)
- Sacred Heart College (disambiguation)
- Sacred Heart school (disambiguation)
