= Our Lady of the Sacred Heart (disambiguation) =

Our Lady of the Sacred Heart is a title of the Virgin Mary.

Our Lady of the Sacred Heart may also refer to:

== Churches ==
- Abbey of Our Lady of the Sacred Heart, in Westmalle, Belgium
- Basilica of Our Lady of the Sacred Heart in Issoudun, France; Mexico City; and Sittard, Netherlands
- Church of Our Lady of the Sacred Heart, in Tappan, New York, United States
- Convent of Our Lady of the Sacred Heart, in Ottawa, Ontario, Canada
- Nostra Signora del Sacro Cuore, in Rome's Piazza Navona
- Our Lady of the Sacred Heart church, in Carlton, Victoria, Australia
- Our Lady of the Sacred Heart Church, in Randwick, Australia
- Our Lady of the Sacred Heart Church, in Thursday Island, Australia
- Our Lady of the Sacred Heart Church, in Chamdo, Tibet
- Parish of Our Lady of the Sacred Heart, in Middlesbrough, England
- Our Lady of the Sacred Heart Parish Church, Tas-Sliema, Malta
- Our Lady of the Sacred Heart Parish Church, Punta Carretas, Montevideo, Uruguay
- Daughters of Our Lady of the Sacred Heart, a Roman Catholic order

== Schools and colleges ==
- Our Lady of the Sacred Heart College, Adelaide, in Enfield, South Australia
- Our Lady of the Sacred Heart College, Melbourne, in Bentleigh, Victoria, Australia
- Our Lady of the Sacred Heart College, Sydney, in Kensington, New South Wales, Australia
- Our Lady of the Sacred Heart High School (Coraopolis), in Coraopolis, Pennsylvania, United States
- Our Lady of the Sacred Heart Parish School, in Tappan, New York, United States
- Our Lady of The Sacred Heart School in Hammond Island, Springsure, and Thursday Island in Queensland, Australia
- Our Lady of the Sacred Heart School, in City Heights, San Diego, California, United States
- Our Lady of the Sacred Heart School, in Randwick, Australia
- Our Lady of the Sacred Heart School, in Quezon City, Metro Manila, Philippines
