= Our Lady of the Sacred Heart College =

Our Lady of the Sacred Heart College may refer to:

- Our Lady of the Sacred Heart College, Adelaide, Australia
- Our Lady of the Sacred Heart College, Bentleigh, Australia, abbreviated as OLSH Bentleigh
- Our Lady of the Sacred Heart College, Sydney, Australia
- Our Lady of the Sacred Heart College, Guimba, Nueva Ecija, the Philippines
