= OLSH =

OLSH is an acronym for "Our Lady of the Sacred Heart," which could in turn refer to institutions such as schools or churches.

Several such institutions:

- Our Lady of the Sacred Heart High School' in Coraopolis, Pennsylvania.
- Our Lady of the Sacred Heart College, Adelaide, in Enfield, South Australia
- Our Lady of the Sacred Heart College, Sydney, in Kensington, New South Wales
