= List of schools in the Roman Catholic Diocese of Camden =

This is a list of schools in the Roman Catholic Diocese of Camden.

== K-12 schools ==
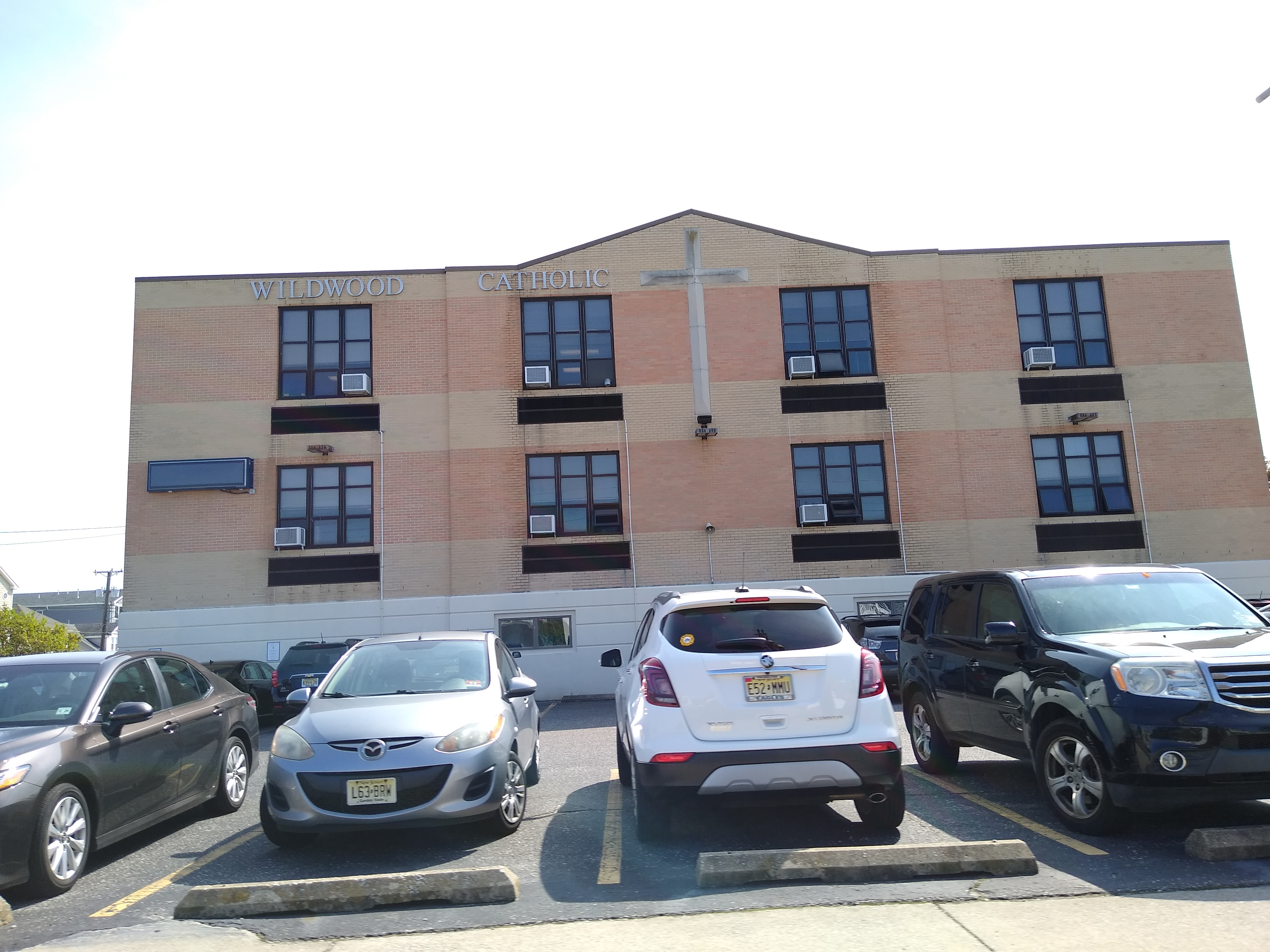
Wildwood Catholic Academy in North Wildwood

- Wildwood Catholic Academy, North Wildwood (Wildwood Catholic High School merged in June 2020 with Cape Trinity Catholic School)

== High schools ==
- Bishop Eustace Preparatory School, Pennsauken Township
- Camden Catholic High School, Cherry Hill
- Gloucester Catholic High School, Gloucester City
- Holy Spirit High School, Absecon
- Our Lady of Mercy Academy, Newfield
- Paul VI High School, Haddonfield
- St. Augustine Preparatory School, Richland in Buena Vista Township

== Elementary schools ==
The schools in Camden and Pennsauken are, as of 2017, are a part of Catholic Partnership Schools.

Atlantic County

- Our Lady Star of the Sea Regional School (Atlantic City)
- Assumption Regional Catholic School (Galloway Township) - The current building opened in September 2007. Prior to that date the school was in Pomona.
- St. Vincent de Paul Regional School (Mays Landing, Hamilton Township)
- St. Joseph Regional School (Somers Point)
- St. Mary Regional School (East Vineland, Buena Vista Township)

Camden County

- Camden
- Holy Name School
- Sacred Heart School
- St. Anthony of Padua School
- St. Joseph Pro-Cathedral School
  Other cities
- Our Lady of Mt. Carmel Regional School (Berlin)
- Our Lady of Hope Regional School (Blackwood) - St. Agnes and St. Jude Schools merged into this one in 2008.
- Resurrection Regional Catholic Schools (Cherry Hill) - It formed in 2008 from the merger of two Cherry Hill schools: Queen of Heaven and St. Peter Celestine. The St. Peter Celestine site was used. In addition to Cherry Hill, residents of Haddonfield, Maple Shade, Moorestown, Mount Laurel, and Pennsauken attend the school. In 2009 it had 361 students.
- St. Rose of Lima School (Haddon Heights)
- Christ the King Regional School (Haddonfield)
- St. Peter School (Merchantville)
- St. Cecilia School (Pennsauken Township) - A portion of the students reside in Camden as of 2017.
- St. Teresa Regional School (Runnemede)
- Saint John Paul II Regional School (Stratford)

Cape May County

- Bishop McHugh Regional School (Dennis Township, with a Cape May Courthouse postal address)
  - The Press of Atlantic City describes as being in Ocean View, though it lies outside of the CDP.
  - It is the parish school of the Avalon/Stone Harbor, Cape May Court House, Marmora/Woodbine and Sea Isle City churches. As of 2020 students from the following Cape May County locations attended the school: Dennis Township, Avalon, Cape May, Lower Township, Middle Township, North Wildwood, Ocean City, Sea Isle City, Stone Harbor, Upper Township, Wildwood, and Woodbine. It also received students from Egg Harbor Township in Atlantic County and Millville in Cumberland County.

Cumberland County

- Bishop Schad Regional School (Vineland) - Opened in 2007 in the former Sacred Heart Regional School site (Sacred Heart/St. Isidore), formed by the merger of that school and St. Francis of Assisi.

Gloucester County

- St. Michael the Archangel Regional School (Clayton) - It opened in 2008 as a merger of St. Catherine of Siena (Clayton) and St. Bridget (Glassboro) Catholic schools, with the Siena site used. It is the parish school of the two respective churches as well as the Nativity (Franklinville, Franklin Township), Our Lady of Lourdes (Glassboro), and Our Lady Queen of Peace (Pitman) churches.
- Guardian Angels Regional School (Pre-K-Grade 3 campus in Gibbstown CDP, Greenwich Township and 4-8 campus in Paulsboro) - The school enrolls Gloucester County students from, in addition to Greenwich Township and Paulsboro: Deptford Township, East Greenwich Township (including Clarksboro, Mickleton, and Mount Royal), Logan Township, Mantua Township, Mullica Hill in Harrison Township, National Park, Swedesboro, West Deptford Township, and Woolwich Township. Additionally, it takes students from Carneys Point, Penns Grove, Pennsville, and Salem in Salem County.
- Holy Angels Catholic School (Woodbury) - It opened in 2017 in the former St. Patrick School building. The former Holy Trinity School in Deptford Township, was moved to the former St. Patrick's Building due to the superior condition of that building, according to the archdiocese.
- St. Mary School (Williamstown, Monroe Township)
- St. Margaret Regional School (Woodbury Heights)

== Former schools ==
=== Former high schools ===
- Saint James High School- Closed in 2000
- Sacred Heart High School - Closed in 2013
- Saint Joseph High School - Closed in 2020 - replaced by the private non-diocesan St. Joseph Academy

=== Former grade schools ===
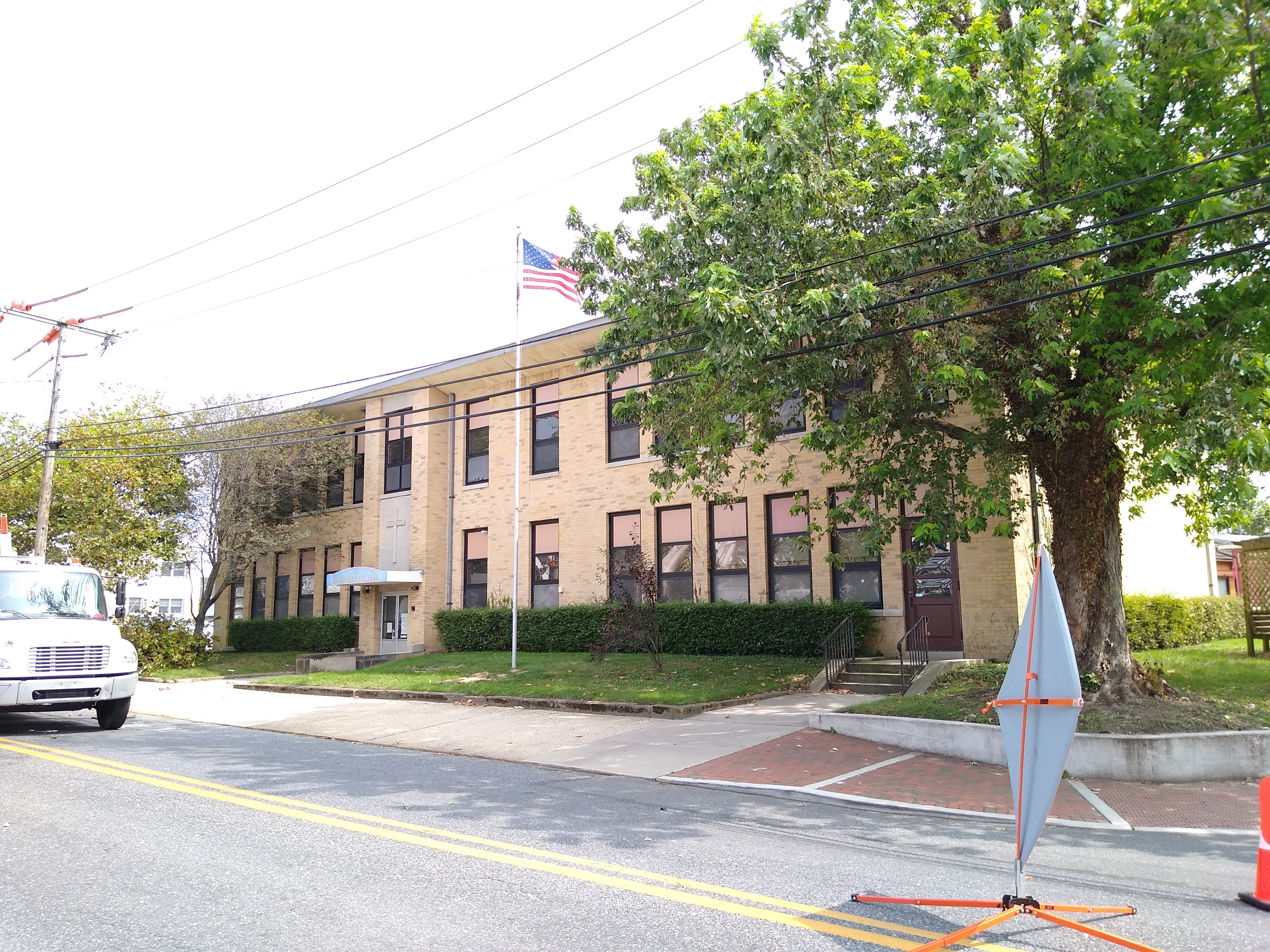
The former Our Lady Star of the Sea Catholic School in Cape May, which closed in 2010

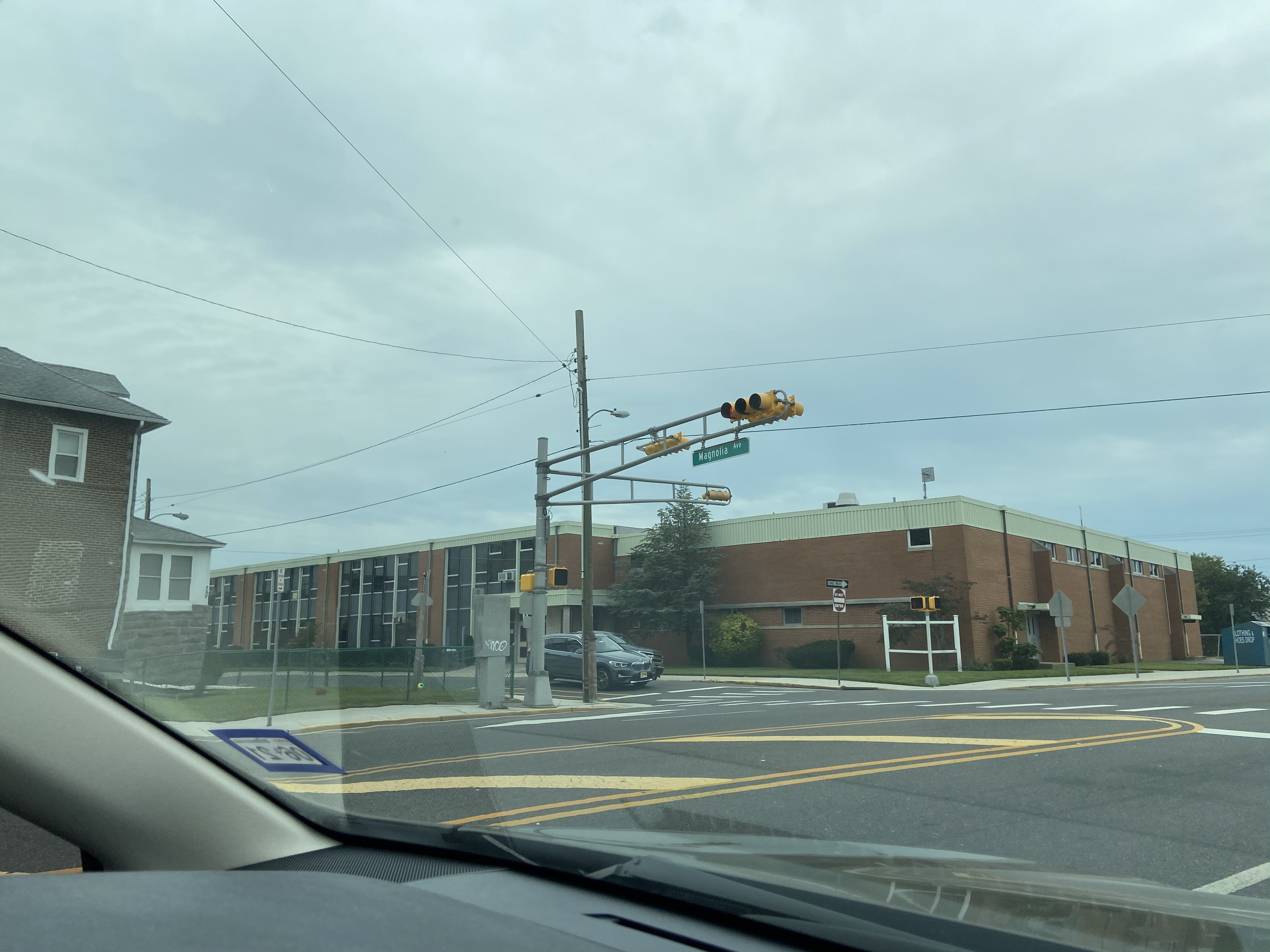
Former St. Ann Regional School in Wildwood

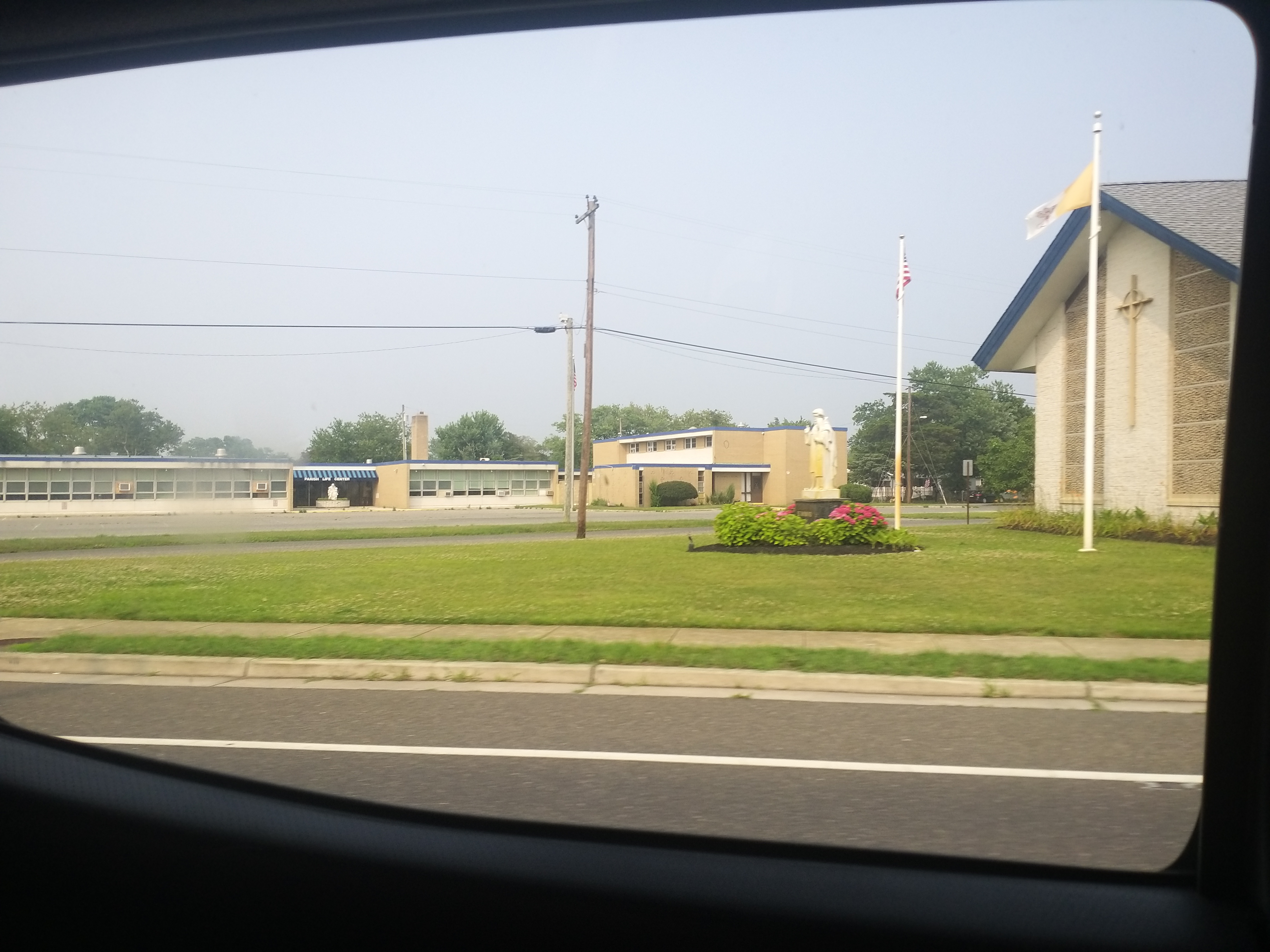
St. Raymond Church in Villas formerly had a Catholic grade school, which closed in 2006

As of 2009 the archdiocese consider 200 as the minimum optimal enrollment for a Catholic grade school, and 225 was considered to be the lowest number in which a school could have at least one class for each grade level. In 2001 the K-8 schools in the diocese had 14,954 students, but by the 2007–2008 school year this declined to 10,883.

Former grade schools include:

Atlantic County
- Ventnor

- Holy Family Regional School - It formed in 2008 from the merger of the St. James School and Blessed Sacrament Schools. It was cosponsored by Holy Trinity Church Church in Ventnor and St. Gianna Beretta Church of Northfield. By 2011 it had a loss of $172,000 and only had 92 students. It closed in 2011. The building was demolished in 2016.
- St. James School - It had 124 students in 2008. In 2008 it merged into Holy Family Regional, which closed in 2011. The building was demolished in 2016.

- Other cities

- Blessed Sacrament Regional School (Margate) - In 2008 it merged into Holy Family Regional. It had 193 students in 2008.
- Notre Dame School (Landisville, Buena campus) It closed in 2012. (See Newfield in Gloucester County for additional information)
- St. Joseph Regional School (Hammonton) - It had 191 students in 2015. In 2020 this figure was down to 94, a 50% decline. It closed after Spring 2020
- St. Nicholas School (Egg Harbor City) - It closed in 2007. A private elementary school opened in the former site.
- St. Peter School (Pleasantville)
- St. Philip the Apostle School (Brigantine)

Camden County

- Barrington
- Our Lady of the Sacred Heart Regional School - St. Francis de Sales Regional School in Barrington and Annunciation Regional School in Bellmawr merged into Our Lady of the Sacred Heart in 2008, using the St. Francis site. The school had 152 students in September of that year. On May 17, 2009 the diocese stated that the school would continue operations; it had 97 students at that time. By mid-June enrollment was downt to 79, the diocese chose to close the school. At the end of its operations it had 20 teachers and 10 other employees.
- St. Francis de Sales Regional School - In 2008 it merged into Our Lady of the Sacred Heart Regional, using the St. Francis site. It had 209 students in 2008.
  Blackwood
- St. Agnes Regional School - In 2008 it merged into a new school in the St. Jude location, but there were plans to use the St. Agnes building prior to any expansion of the St. Jude building to accommodate new students. The school had 205 students in 2008.
- St. Jude Regional School - In 2008 it merged into a new school in the St. Jude location. It had 438 students in 2008.
  Camden
- The San Miguel School
- St. Joan of Arc School
  Cherry Hill
- Holy Rosary Regional School
- Queen of Heaven School - In 2008 it merged into Resurrection School, in the St. Peter location. It had 125 students in 2008.
- St. Peter Celestine School - In 2008 it merged into Resurrection School, St. Peter location. It had 252 students in 2008.
  Collingswood
- Good Shepherd Regional School - It had 154 students in 2015. In 2020 this figure was down to 108, a 30% decline. It closed after Spring 2020. Historically students had matriculated to Camden Catholic, Gloucester Catholic and Paul VI.
- St. John School - Merged in 2008 into a new Collingswood school. In 2008 it had 157 students.
  Other cities
- Annunciation Regional (Bellmawr) - In 2008 it merged into Our Lady of the Sacred Heart in Barrington, with the site of St. Francis de Sales school used. It had 123 students in 2008.
- Assumption School (Atco)
- Holy Saviour (Westmont) - Merged in 2008 into a new Collingswood school. In 2008 it had 164 students.
- Our Lady of Grace/Holy Rosary Regional (Somerdale) - In 2008 it merged into a new school in the Stratford location. It had 123 students in 2008.
- St. Edward School (Pine Hill)
- St. Lawrence School (Lindenwold) - In 2008 it merged into a new school in the Stratford location. It had 163 students in 2008.
- St. Luke School (Stratford) - In 2008 it merged into a new school in the Stratford location. It had 169 students in 2008.
- St. Mary School (Gloucester City)
- St. Peter School (Merchantville)
- St. Stephen School (Pennsauken)

Cape May County

- Cape Trinity Catholic School (North Wildwood) - Established in 2010 by the merger of Our Lady Star of the Sea and St. Ann's School. Merged with Wildwood High School in June 2020 to avoid planned closure
- Our Lady Star of the Sea Regional School (Cape May) - It served as the parish school for Our Lady Star of the Sea, St. John of God (North Cape May) and St. Raymond (Villas) churches. In 2007 it absorbed students from St. Raymond School. It merged into Cape Trinity School in North Wildwood in 2010. A decline in student enrollment was cited as the reason.
- St. Ann's School (Wildwood) - Merged into Cape Trinity School in North Wildwood in 2010.
- St. Augustine Regional School (Ocean City) - Closed in 2008, with 112 students as the final enrollment.
- St. Raymond's School (Villas CDP, Lower Township) - It closed in 2007 with students sent to Our Lady Star of the Sea in Cape May.

Cumberland County
- Vineland

- Sacred Heart Regional School a.k.a. Sacred Heart/St. Isidore - Consolidated into Bishop Schad in 2007
- St. Francis of Assisi School - Consolidated into Bishop Schad in 2007

- Other cities

- Immaculate Conception Regional School (Bridgeton)
- St. Mary Magdalen School (Millville) - Closed in 2012

Gloucester County

- Holy Trinity School (Westville) - It was formerly Most Holy Redeemer School but became Holy Trinity in 2007 after it absorbed other schools: St. Patrick's School in Woodbury; St. Matthew's School in National Park, and the Verga section of West Deptford Township, New Jersey; and Most Holy Redeemer in the Westville Grove area of Westville. In 2017 the school was moved to the former St. Patrick's building, with the Holy Trinity building closed.
- Most Holy Redeemer School (Westville Grove) - The archdiocese announced in February 2007 that it would consolidate into Holy Trinity Regional School effective fall 2007.
- Notre Dame Regional School (Newfield campus) - The school had campuses in both Newfield and Landisville, the latter in Atlantic County. The school closed in 2012. It had 270 students at the time of closure. That year remnants of the school formed the non-Catholic Edgarton Christian Academy in Newfield. 263 of the former Notre Dame students moved to Edgarton.
- St. Catherine of Siena School (Clayton) - In 2008 it merged into the St. Michael the Archangel School in Clayton, in the former Siena site. It had 172 students in 2008.
- St. Bridget Regional School (Glassboro) - In 2008 it merged into the St. Michael the Archangel School in Clayton. in the former Siena site. It had 216 students in 2008.
- St. Joseph Regional School (Swedesboro)
- St. Matthew's School (West Deptford Township) - It merged into Holy Trinity School in 2007, with its campus closed.
- St. Matthew Regional School (had campuses in National Park and the Verga section of West Deptford Township) - The archdiocese announced in February 2007 that it would consolidate into a Westville Grove school site effective fall 2007 as Holy Trinity Regional School.
- St. Patrick's School (Woodbury) - It merged into Holy Trinity School in 2007, with its campus closed.

Salem County

- Bishop Guilfoyle Regional Catholic School (Carneys Point) - In the 2001–2002 school year it had 373 students, the highest ever. By 2010 enrollment declined to 111. Citing the enrollment decline, the diocese closed the school in 2010. It was the final Catholic school in the county.
- St. James Elementary School (Penns Grove) - Closed in 2000, students redirected to Bishop Guilfoyle.
- St. Mary Regional School (Salem) - Closed in 2000, students redirected to Bishop Guilfoyle.

=== Former Kindergartens ===
- Li'l Angels Kindergarten (Cape May Courthouse)
