= Sacred Heart of Mary High School =

Sacred Heart of Mary High School may refer to:

- Sacred Heart of Mary High School, now St. Viator High School, Rolling Meadows, Illinois, US
- Sacred Heart of Mary High School (Montebello), now Cantwell-Sacred Heart of Mary High School, Montebello, California, US

== See also ==
- Sacred Heart School (disambiguation)
- List of Schools of the Sacred Heart
