= Tony Siscone =

American racing driver

Tony Siscone (born March 25, 1949) is an American former asphalt modified racecar driver, having competed from 1973 through 1994.

Siscone was raised in the Collings Lakes section of Buena Vista Township, New Jersey. A resident of Hammonton, New Jersey, he graduated from Hammonton High School in 1967 and from Rider University in 1971. Siscone was a high school teacher for 17 years. In 1976, he married Margaret, "Margi", Clark from Berlin, NJ and later had a son and a daughter. After receiving the N.J. Governor's "Teacher Recognition Award" in 1987, Siscone retired from teaching and he and his wife started their own business, "Safety Connection Inc."

During his 22 years of stock car racing, Siscone competed in 784 races: 151 victories, 2nd place 121 times, 3rd place 111 times, 4th & 5th place 108 times. Amazingly, Tony Siscone finished in the top-three positions in 49% of his career races and finished in the top-five positions in 63% of his career races. Siscone and his Teams also earned 12 track Championships: 6-at Wall Stadium, 3-at Atlantic City Speedway, 2-at NASCAR's Flemington Speedway, and 1-at NASCAR's New Egypt Speedway. Siscone also ranked 2nd in all-time wins in Wall Stadium's NASCAR Modified division 1950-1992.

== Racing career ==
Tony Siscone began his racing career driving go-karts from 1962-1969. He and his father had 90 victories including IKF State and Regional karting titles. Siscone and his father, Tony Sr., competed several times in IKF National Championship go-kart events against factory backed teams, finishing tenth, sixth and fourth.

Siscone began his stock car racing career in 1972, driving the Richie Terruso #T3 sportsman car to 8 victories at Atlantic City Speedway and Wall Stadium. Siscone won his first track championship at Atlantic City Speedway in 1974, driving the #T4 owned by his father and Tony Ruberti. During 1975 & 1976, Siscone drove the #65 car owned by John Lyons, and powered by a Tom Skinner/John Lyons Chevy racing engine to 12 victories and his 2nd championship in 1976. In 1978, Siscone drove the #21X owned by Ed Brown/John Lyons to six wins, and the #21 owned by Sal DeBruno to four wins. The two cars won every race they finished, resulting in Siscone's third track championship at the Atlantic City Speedway.

From 1973-1975, Siscone struggled to get his modified stock car career on track. The Terruso brothers gave Siscone his first opportunity to compete in the modified ranks driving their modified #T2. As time went on, the team began to realized they lacked the finances to compete with the top teams. During the1975 season, Siscone and the Terruso team parted ways. After 3 Modified seasons with the Terruso team, Tony had 64 starts in the #T2: 6-top-5 finishes, 3-2nd place finishes and 3-3rd place finishes and no wins. Midway through the 1976 season at Wall Stadium, Siscone landed a ride in Tom Green's #71 modified. Siscone wheeled the "Green Machine" to 2-2nd place finishes and 6-top-5 finishes...and still failed to reach victory lane.

In 1977, after struggling for 4 modified seasons, fellow Hammontonian Frank Ransom offered Siscone the ride in his controversial # 0 NASCAR Modified. The Ransom/Siscone Team won 3-modified events with a 355 CI small block Chevy engine against the big block modifieds at Wall Stadium and NASCAR's New Egypt Speedway. In April 1978, opening night at Wall Stadium, the Ransom/Siscone team won the modified main event. 4 days after celebrating their big win, car owner Frank Ransom sadly passed away. Siscone and Team Ransom were devastated. After 3 months without a modified ride at Wall Stadium, Siscone was given the chance to drive the Fred & Kathy Burdge #57 modified. After 12 races, the Burdge/Siscone team ended the season with 2-2nds 3-top 5 finishes, 6 top-10 finishes and NO WINS.

In August 1978, car owner Dick Barney, Robert Barney, and Hoyt Morrison offered Siscone the chance to drive their #14 modified car during the last 6-races of the season at NASCAR's New Egypt Speedway. Siscone finished all six races in the top-5. The Barney/Morrison team wrapped up the 1978 season at Wall Stadium's "Turkey Derby 150". Siscone started 23rd in the Derby and charged to a fifth place finish. Needless to say, Siscone continued to drive the No. 14 for the next 16 years.

In 1982, Siscone was involved in a violent crash with Ray Evernham's #19 modified at the Martinsville Speedway. The accident occurred on lap 166 of the 250-lap race. Evernham's car blew a tire on the back straight away and Siscone crashed into him, causing a large, firery explosion. While Evernham suffered minor burns, Siscone suffered third degree burns to both of his hands. The following year, 1983, was the Team's "comeback season". The Barney/Siscone Team went on to win the New Egypt Speedway NASCAR Championship, finishing in the top-three in every race with no DNFs. The Barney/Siscone Team also won the 1983 Wall Stadium Modified Championship. Despite his previous injuries, Siscone returned to the Martinsville Speedway in 1984, 2-years after grafting surgery to both hands. The team competed in NASCAR's Modified portion of the "Cardinal 500", and won the prestigious event.

In 1994, Tony Siscone, surprisingly, retired from racing in victory lane after winning the "Sunoco Race of Champions 250" at the Flemington Speedway. The Barney/Siscone Team became the only New Jersey Modified Team to ever win both the Modified portion of the "Cardinal 500" at the Martinsville Speedway and the "Modified Race of Champions 250".

== Awards & Achievements ==
| Year | Description |
|---|---|
| 1972 | "Rookie of the Year" - Wall Stadium and Atlantic City Speedway |
| 1983 | "Fred DeSarro Sportsmanship Award" |
| 1984 | "Driver of the Week Award" - Motor Week Illustrated |
| 1989 | "Dick Toby Tobias Achievement Award" |
| 1993 | The Barney/Siscone Team won 11 consecutive modified events at 3 different tracks. |
| 1995 | Inducted into the "Race of Champions Hall of Fame"; 12 time "Track Champion" at 4 different Speedways |
| 1999 | Inducted into the "National Old Timers Racing Hall of Fame" |
| 2001 | Inducted into the "Garden State Stock Car Club's Hall of Fame" |
| 2013 | Inducted into the "Eastern Motorsports Press Association Hall of Fame" |
| 2026 | Wall Stadium honors Siscone's racing achievements by naming a grandstand section after him. |
