= Sacred Heart Seminary =

Sacred Heart Seminary may refer to:

- Sacred Heart Major Seminary, in Detroit, Michigan
- Sacred Heart Seminary and School of Theology, in Hales Corners, Wisconsin
- Sacred Heart Seminary, Poonamallee in Tamil Nadu, India
- Sacred Heart Seminary, a closed Catholic seminary in Fort Wayne, Indiana, in operation from 1939 to 1948
- Sacred Heart Seminary, a closed Catholic school in Hempstead, New York, in operation from 1869 to 1994

== See also ==
- Sacred Heart school (disambiguation)
- Sacred Heart Academy (disambiguation)
