= Daughters of Our Lady of the Sacred Heart =

The Congregation of the Daughters of Our Lady of the Sacred Heart is a Roman Catholic religious institute founded in Issoudun, France, on 30 August 1874 by Servant of God Jules Chevalier (1824–1907), the Founder of the Missionaries of the Sacred Heart. The order has an orientation towards missionary work and teaching and it is one of the members of the Chevalier Family group.

From the Latin form of its name, Filiae Dominae Nostrae Sacro Corde, it takes the abbreviation FDNSC. The first Superior-General of the Daughters of Our Lady of the Sacred Heart was Sr Marie Louise Hartzer.

== Pacific ==
Recently, the order has been active in Papua New Guinea and Kiribati with spiritual and health work.

== Australia ==
The Daughters also work in Australia, where they founded and ran four girls' secondary college:

- Our Lady of the Sacred Heart College, Sydney
- Sacred Heart Girls' College, Oakleigh, Melbourne
- Our Lady of the Sacred Heart, Bentleigh, Melbourne
- Our Lady of the Sacred Heart College, Adelaide

There are convents located in Melbourne (VIC), Sydney (NSW) and Bowral (NSW). The convent in Bowral, Hartzer Park, now also functions as a conference centre and retreat.
