= College of the Sacred Heart =

College of the Sacred Heart may refer to:

- College of the Sacred Heart, a former college in Grand Coteau, Louisiana
- A former name of Regis University, Denver, Colorado
- A former name of Manhattanville College, Purchase, New York
- Baradene College of the Sacred Heart, Auckland, New Zealand
- Campion College of the Sacred Heart, former name of Campion High School (1880-1975), Prairie du Chien, Wisconsin
- Newton College of the Sacred Heart, Newton Centre, Massachusetts

== See also ==
- Sacred Heart College (disambiguation)
- Sacred Heart (disambiguation)
