= Missionary Sisters of the Sacred Heart =

Roman Catholic religious congregation for women

The Missionary Sisters of the Sacred Heart is a Roman Catholic religious institute, founded on 25 March 1900 (125 years ago) in Germany by a Dutch MSC, Fr. Hubert Linckens (1861–1922). The institution is member of the Chevalier Family.
