= Buena Vista Township, New Jersey =

Township in Atlantic County, New Jersey, US

- Township
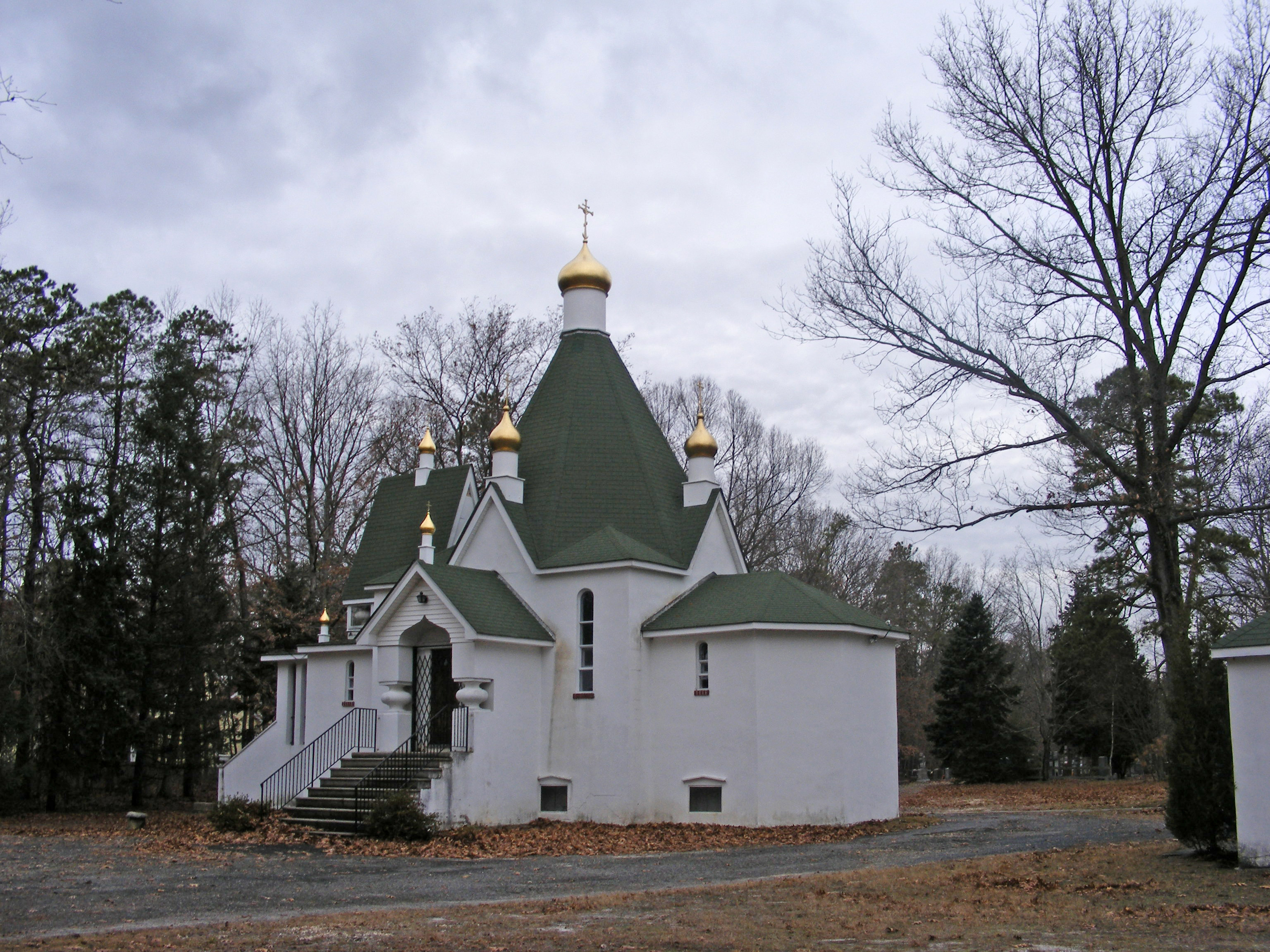
- Russian Orthodox Church, New Kuban

- logo
- Motto: "44 miles of opportunity"
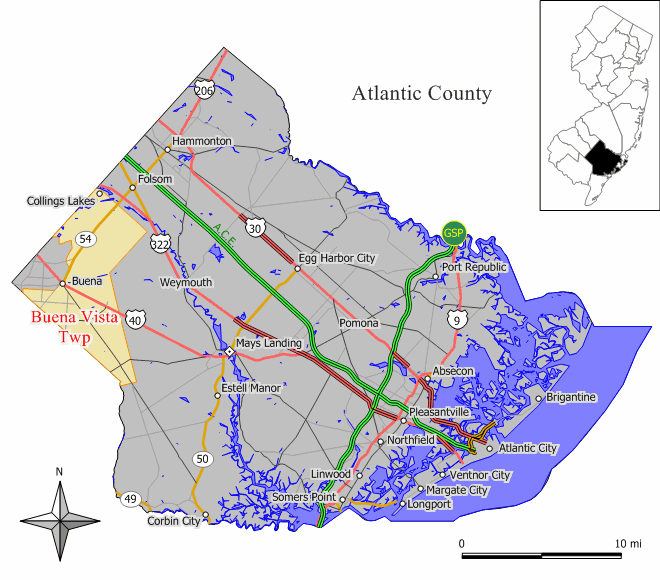
- Location of Buena Vista Township in Atlantic County highlighted in yellow (left). Inset map: Location of Atlantic County in New Jersey highlighted in black (right).

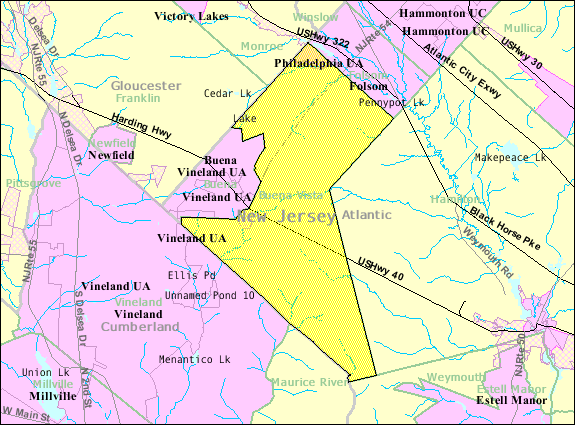
- Census Bureau map of Buena Vista, New Jersey

- Location in Atlantic County Location in New Jersey Location in the United States
- Coordinates: 39.513087°N 74.880028°W
- Country: United States
- State: New Jersey
- County: Atlantic
- Incorporated: March 5, 1867
- Named after: Battle of Buena Vista

Government
  - Type: Township
  - Body: Township Committee
  - Mayor: William Ruggieri (R, term ends December 31, 2026)
  - Administrator: Lisa A. Tilton
  - Municipal clerk: Lisa A. Tilton

Area
  - Total: 41.58 sq mi (107.69 km^{2})
  - Land: 41.08 sq mi (106.39 km^{2})
  - Water: 0.50 sq mi (1.30 km^{2}) 1.20%
  - Rank: 49th of 565 in state 6th of 23 in county
- Elevation: 82 ft (25 m)

Population (2020)
  - Total: 7,033
  - Estimate (2023): 7,090
  - Rank: 318th of 565 in state 12th of 23 in county
  - Density: 171.2/sq mi (66.1/km^{2})
  - Rank: 514th of 565 in state 19th of 23 in county
- Time zone: UTC−05:00 (Eastern (EST))
  - Summer (DST): UTC−04:00 (Eastern (EDT))
- ZIP Code: 08310 – Buena
- Area codes: 609, 856
- FIPS code: 3400108710
- GNIS feature ID: 0882048
- Website: buenavistanj.com

Buena Vista Township (/ˌbjuːnə ˈvɪstə/ BEW-nə VIST-ə) is a township located in Atlantic County, in the U.S. state of New Jersey. The township, and all of Atlantic County, is part of the Atlantic City-Hammonton metropolitan statistical area, which in turn is included in the Philadelphia metropolitan area.

As of the 2020 United States census, the township's population was 7,033, a decrease of 537 (−7.1%) from the 2010 census count of 7,570, which in turn reflected an increase of 134 (+1.8%) from the 7,436 counted in the 2000 census.

Buena Vista was incorporated as a township by an act of the New Jersey Legislature on March 5, 1867, from portions of Hamilton Township. Portions of the township were taken on May 23, 1906, to create Folsom, and on September 1, 1948, to create Buena Borough. The name comes from the 1847 Battle of Buena Vista of the Mexican–American War.

The township is headquarters for Troop A of the New Jersey State Police, which covers more than 2,000 square miles (5,200 km^{2}) and 1.7 million residents.

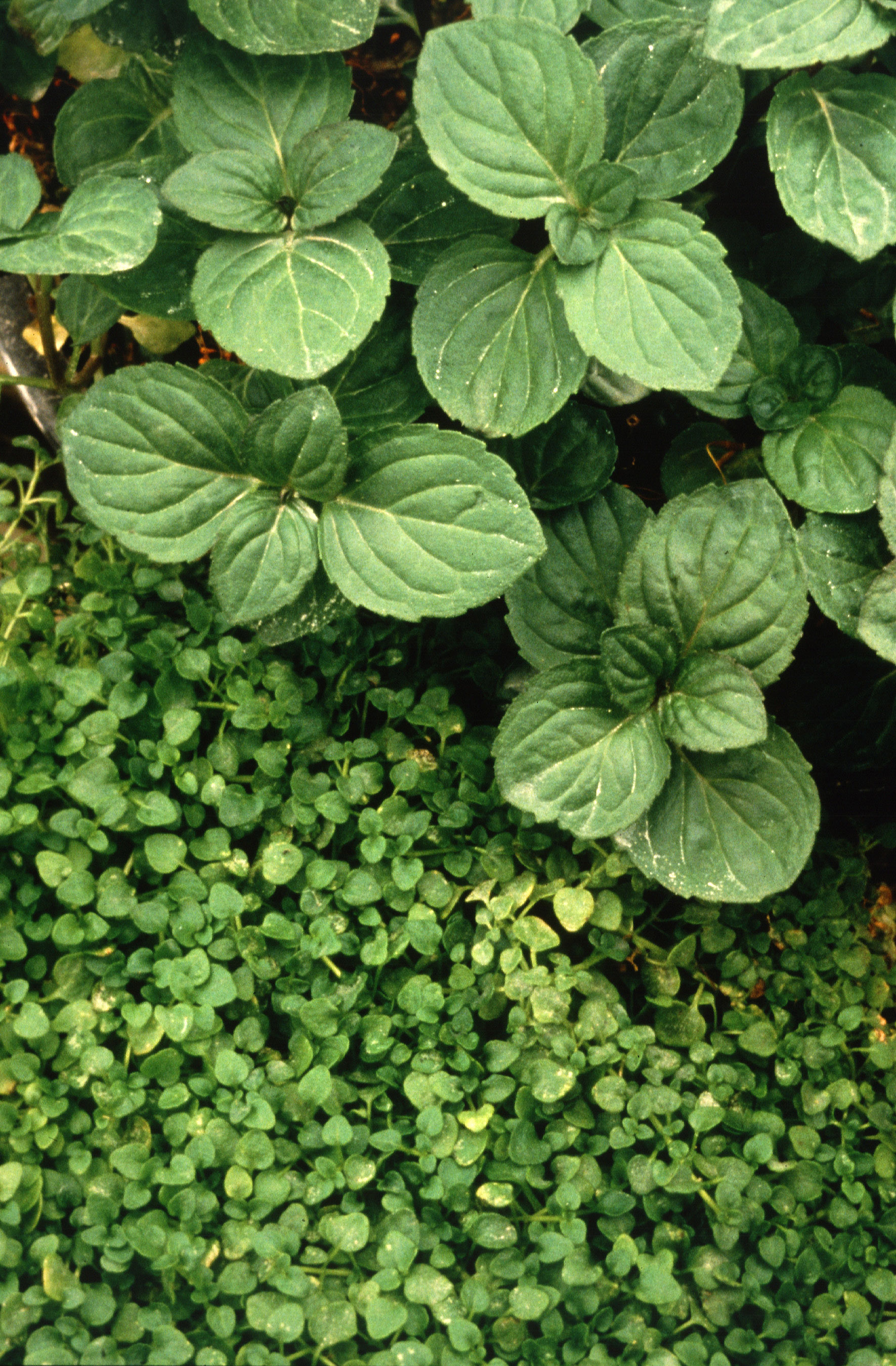
Mint

On April 26, 2004, the Buena Vista Township Committee voted to temporarily rename the community of Richland, a section of Buena Vista Township. For the first half of the month of May, Richland became Mojito, New Jersey, named after the Cuban rum drink. Bacardi had offered to give the township $5,000 for recreation projects in exchange for a sign placed on U.S. Route 40 commemorating the new name. Richland was chosen because it is home to the family-run Dalponte Farms, a major east coast supplier of mint, an essential ingredient of the mojito.

== Geography ==
According to the United States Census Bureau, the township had a total area of 41.58 square miles (107.69 km^{2}), including 41.08 square miles (106.39 km^{2}) of land and 0.50 square miles (1.30 km^{2}) of water (1.20%).

Collings Lakes (with a 2020 population of 1,501), East Vineland (925), Milmay (919), Newtonville (742), and Richland (623) are an unincorporated communities and census-designated places (CDP) located partially or completely within Buena Vista Township.

Other unincorporated communities, localities and place names located partially or completely within the township include Buena Acres, Lake Ann, New Kuban, and Pine Lake Estates.

The township borders Buena, Folsom, Hamilton Township and Weymouth Township in Atlantic County; Maurice River Township and Vineland in Cumberland County; and both Franklin Township and Monroe Township in Gloucester County.

The township is one of 56 South Jersey municipalities that are included within the New Jersey Pinelands National Reserve, a protected natural area of unique ecology covering 1,100,000 acres (450,000 ha), that has been classified as a United States Biosphere Reserve and established by Congress in 1978 as the nation's first National Reserve. Part of the township is included in the state-designated Pinelands Area, which includes portions of Atlantic County, along with areas in Burlington, Camden, Cape May, Cumberland, Gloucester and Ocean counties. 90% of the township's area is within the boundaries of the Pine Barrens.

== Demographics ==
Historical population
Census	Pop.	Note	%±
1870	948		—
1880	885		−6.6%
1890	1,299		46.8%
1900	1,646		26.7%
1910	2,723	*	65.4%
1920	3,647		33.9%
1930	4,176		14.5%
1940	4,067		−2.6%
1950	2,106	*	−48.2%
1960	3,915		85.9%
1970	4,239		8.3%
1980	6,959		64.2%
1990	7,655		10.0%
2000	7,436		−2.9%
2010	7,570		1.8%
2020	7,033		−7.1%
2023 (est.)	7,090		0.8%
Population sources: 1870–2000; 1870–1920 1870 1880–1890; 1890–1910 1910–1930; 1940–2000 2000; 2010 2020 * = Lost territory in previous decade.

=== 2010 census ===
The 2010 United States census counted 7,570 people, 2,786 households, and 2,020 families in the township. The population density was 184.4 per square mile (71.2/km^{2}). There were 3,008 housing units at an average density of 73.3 per square mile (28.3/km^{2}). The racial makeup was 78.18% (5,918) White, 13.45% (1,018) Black or African American, 0.46% (35) Native American, 1.06% (80) Asian, 0.04% (3) Pacific Islander, 4.12% (312) from other races, and 2.69% (204) from two or more races. Hispanic or Latino of any race were 11.48% (869) of the population.

Of the 2,786 households, 27.1% had children under the age of 18; 55.6% were married couples living together; 11.7% had a female householder with no husband present and 27.5% were non-families. Of all households, 22.7% were made up of individuals and 11.2% had someone living alone who was 65 years of age or older. The average household size was 2.71 and the average family size was 3.19.

22.9% of the population were under the age of 18, 8.0% from 18 to 24, 23.1% from 25 to 44, 29.7% from 45 to 64, and 16.4% who were 65 years of age or older. The median age was 42.1 years. For every 100 females, the population had 95.0 males. For every 100 females ages 18 and older there were 91.8 males.

=== 2000 census ===
As of the 2000 United States census there were 7,436 people living in the township, organized into 2,648 households and 1,972 families. The population density was 179.8 inhabitants per square mile (69.4/km^{2}). There were 2,827 housing units at an average density of 68.3 per square mile (26.4/km^{2}). The racial makeup of the township was 77.34% White, 15.69% African American, 0.23% Native American, 0.22% Asian, 0.01% Pacific Islander, 4.07% from other races, and 2.43% from two or more races. 9.27% of the population were Hispanic or Latino of any race.

There were 2,648 households, out of which 30.6% had children under the age of 18 living with them, 58.5% were married couples living together, 10.6% had a female householder with no husband present, and 25.5% were non-families. 21.0% of all households were made up of individuals, and 10.6% had someone living alone who was 65 years of age or older. The average household size was 2.77 and the average family size was 3.20.

In the township the population was spread out, with 24.7% under the age of 18, 7.4% from 18 to 24, 27.5% from 25 to 44, 25.0% from 45 to 64, and 15.3% who were 65 years of age or older. The median age was 39 years. For every 100 females, there were 95.0 males. For every 100 females age 18 and over, there were 92.6 males.

The median income for a household in the township was $43,770, and the median income for a family was $50,403. Males had a median income of $36,064 versus $26,180 for females. The per capita income for the township was $18,382. 12.1% of the population and 7.8% of families were below the poverty line. Out of the total population, 13.2% of those under the age of 18 and 13.3% of those 65 and older were living below the poverty line.

== Government ==
=== Local government ===
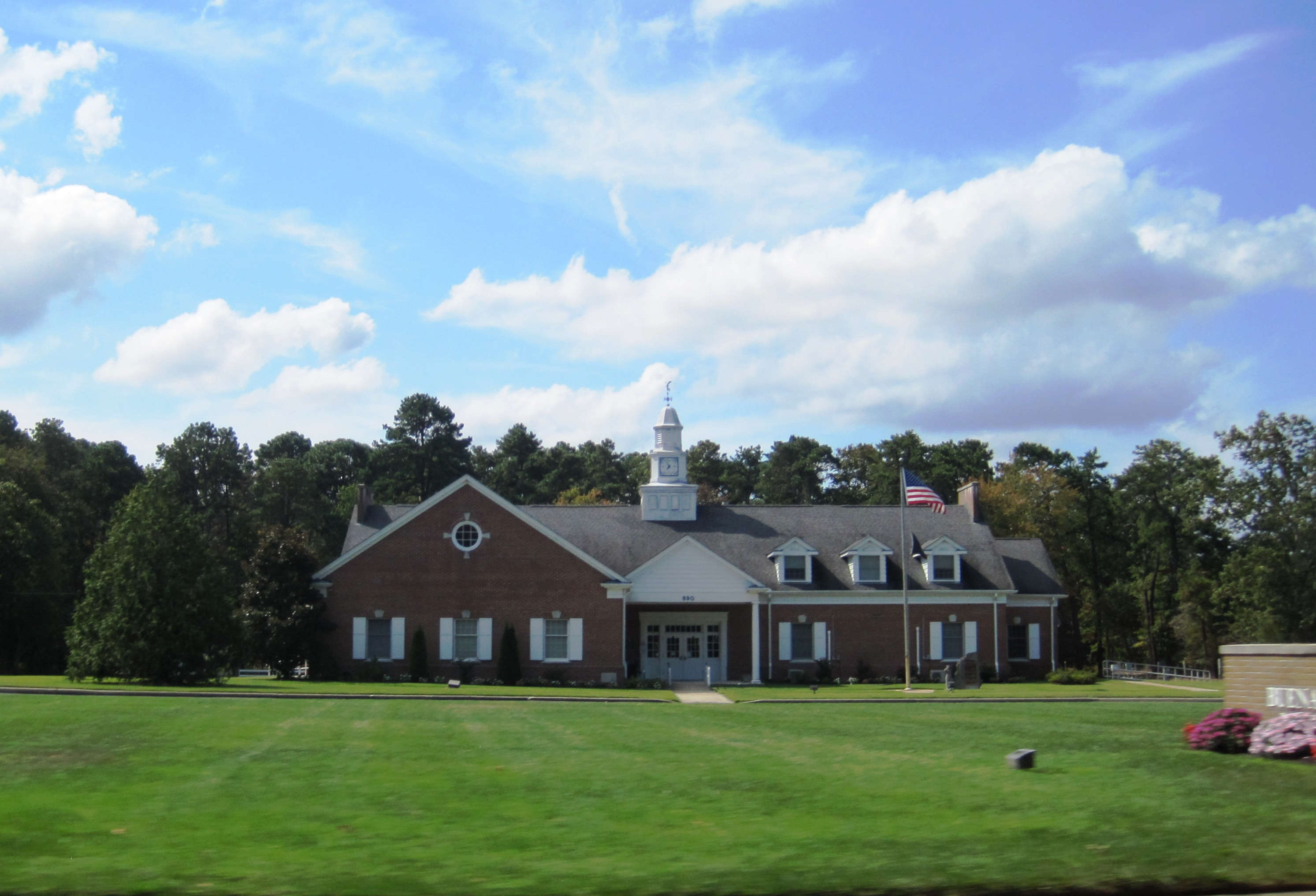
Municipal Building

Buena Vista is governed under the Township form of New Jersey municipal government, one of 141 municipalities (of the 564) statewide that use this form, the second-most commonly used form of government in the state. The Township Committee is comprised of five members, who are elected directly by the voters at-large in partisan elections to serve three-year terms of office on a staggered basis, with either one or two seats coming up for election each year as part of the November general election in a three-year cycle. At an annual reorganization meeting, the Township Committee selects one of its members to serve as Mayor and another to serve as Deputy Mayor.

As of 2026, the members of the Buena Vista Township Committee are Mayor William Ruggieri (R, term on committee and as mayor ends December 31, 2026), Deputy Mayor John H. Williams (term on committee ends 2028; term as deputy mayor ends December 31, 2026), Aaron Krenzer (R, 2027), Kurt Renart (R, 2028) and Ellen Testa (R, 2027).

In December 2019, the Township Committee selected Ronnise White to fill the seat expiring in December 2021 that became vacant following the death of Chuck Chiarello earlier that month; Chiarello had served on the Township Committee for 28 years and as mayor for the previous 23 years.

=== Federal, state and county representation ===
Buena Vista Township is located in the 2nd Congressional District and is part of New Jersey's 4th state legislative district.

For the 119th United States Congress, New Jersey's 2nd congressional district is represented by Jeff Van Drew (R, Dennis Township). New Jersey is represented in the United States Senate by Democrats Cory Booker (Newark, term ends 2027) and Andy Kim (Moorestown, term ends 2031).

For the 2026–2027 session, the 4th legislative district of the New Jersey Legislature is represented in the State Senate by Paul D. Moriarty (D, Washington Township) and in the General Assembly by Dan Hutchison (D, Gloucester Township) and Cody Miller (D, Monroe Township).

Atlantic County is governed by a directly elected county executive and a nine-member Board of County Commissioners, responsible for legislation. The executive serves a four-year term and the commissioners are elected to staggered three-year terms, of which four are elected from the county on an at-large basis and five of the commissioners represent equally populated districts. As of 2025, Atlantic County's Executive is Dennis Levinson (R, Northfield), whose term of office ends December 31, 2027. Members of the Board of County Commissioners are:

Ernest D. Coursey (D, District 1-- Atlantic City, Egg Harbor Township (part), Longport, Margate City, and Ventnor City; 2025, Atlantic City), Chair Maureen Kern (R, District 2-- Egg Harbor Township (part), Linwood, Northfield, Somers Point and Pleasantville; 2027, Somers Point), Andrew Parker III (R, District 3-- Egg Harbor Township (part) and Hamilton Township (part); 2026, Egg Harbor Township), Richard R. Dase (R, District 4, including Brigantine, Galloway Township, Egg Harbor Township (part), and Port Republic; 2025, Galloway Township), Vice Chair James A. Bertino (R, District 5-- Buena, Buena Vista Township, Corbin City, Egg Harbor City, Estell Manor, Folsom, Hamilton Township (part), Hammonton, Mullica Township and Weymouth Township; 2027, Hammonton), June Byrnes (R, At-Large; 2026, Linwood), Michael Ruffu (R, At-Large; Margate, 2027) Amy L. Gatto (R, At-large; 2025, Hamilton Township) and John W. Risley (R, At-Large; 2026, Egg Harbor Township)

Atlantic County's constitutional officers are: Clerk Joesph J. Giralo (R, 2026, Hammonton), Sheriff Joe O'Donoghue (R, 2026, Egg Harbor Township) and Surrogate James Curcio (R, 2025, Hammonton).

=== Politics ===
As of March 2011, there were a total of 4,833 registered voters in Buena Vista Township, of which 1,406 (29.1% vs. 30.5% countywide) were registered as Democrats, 1,105 (22.9% vs. 25.2%) were registered as Republicans and 2,320 (48.0% vs. 44.3%) were registered as Unaffiliated. There were 2 voters registered as either Libertarians or Greens. Among the township's 2010 Census population, 63.8% (vs. 58.8% in Atlantic County) were registered to vote, including 82.8% of those ages 18 and over (vs. 76.6% countywide).

Gubernatorial election results for Buena Vista Township
Year	Republican		Democratic		Third party(ies)	
Year	No.	%	No.	%	No.	%
2025	1,795	59.63%	1,191	39.57%	24	0.80%
2021	1,650	63.68%	922	35.58%	19	0.73%
2017	701	42.56%	903	54.83%	43	2.61%
2013	1,347	59.21%	889	39.08%	39	1.71%
2009	1,191	47.47%	1,149	45.80%	169	6.74%
2005	794	40.04%	1,111	56.03%	78	3.93%

In the 2012 presidential election, Democrat Barack Obama received 1,920 votes (55.3% vs. 57.9% countywide), ahead of Republican Mitt Romney with 1,483 votes (42.7% vs. 41.1%) and other candidates with 36 votes (1.0% vs. 0.9%), among the 3,471 ballots cast by the township's 5,068 registered voters, for a turnout of 68.5% (vs. 65.8% in Atlantic County). In the 2008 presidential election, Democrat Barack Obama received 1,910 votes (54.8% vs. 56.5% countywide), ahead of Republican John McCain with 1,504 votes (43.1% vs. 41.6%) and other candidates with 50 votes (1.4% vs. 1.1%), among the 3,486 ballots cast by the township's 5,131 registered voters, for a turnout of 67.9% (vs. 68.1% in Atlantic County). In the 2004 presidential election, Democrat John Kerry received 1,747 votes (52.4% vs. 52.0% countywide), ahead of Republican George W. Bush with 1,504 votes (45.1% vs. 46.2%) and other candidates with 36 votes (1.1% vs. 0.8%), among the 3,333 ballots cast by the township's 4,791 registered voters, for a turnout of 69.6% (vs. 69.8% in the whole county).

Presidential elections results
Year	Republican	Democratic	Third Parties
2024	61.8% 2,418	36.6% 1,433	1.6% 52
2020	57.0% 2,341	41.7% 1,711	1.3% 42
2016	54.1% 1,732	42.7% 1,366	3.2% 104
2012	42.7% 1,483	55.3% 1,920	1.0% 36
2008	43.1% 1,504	54.8% 1,910	1.4% 50
2004	45.1% 1,504	52.4% 1,747	1.1% 36

In the 2013 gubernatorial election, Republican Chris Christie received 1,347 votes (57.2% vs. 60.0% countywide), ahead of Democrat Barbara Buono with 889 votes (37.7% vs. 34.9%) and other candidates with 39 votes (1.7% vs. 1.3%), among the 2,356 ballots cast by the township's 5,158 registered voters, yielding a 45.7% turnout (vs. 41.5% in the county). In the 2009 gubernatorial election, Republican Chris Christie received 1,191 votes (46.4% vs. 47.7% countywide), ahead of Democrat Jon Corzine with 1,149 votes (44.7% vs. 44.5%), Independent Chris Daggett with 132 votes (5.1% vs. 4.8%) and other candidates with 37 votes (1.4% vs. 1.2%), among the 2,568 ballots cast by the township's 4,916 registered voters, yielding a 52.2% turnout (vs. 44.9% in the county).

United States Senate election results for Buena Vista Township1
Year	Republican		Democratic		Third party(ies)	
Year	No.	%	No.	%	No.	%
2024	2,230	59.88%	1,420	38.13%	74	1.99%
2018	957	39.76%	1,357	56.38%	93	3.86%
2012	1,295	40.17%	1,875	58.16%	54	1.67%
2006	914	45.25%	1,041	51.53%	65	3.22%

United States Senate election results for Buena Vista Township2
Year	Republican		Democratic		Third party(ies)	
Year	No.	%	No.	%	No.	%
2020	2,206	55.47%	1,698	42.70%	73	1.84%
2014	792	45.78%	886	51.21%	52	3.01%
2013	528	49.25%	532	49.63%	12	1.12%
2008	1,306	40.77%	1,837	57.35%	60	1.87%

== Education ==
Students in public school for pre-kindergarten through twelfth grade from Buena Vista Township attend the Buena Regional School District, together with students from Buena Borough. Students are sent to the district's high school for grades 9–12 from both Estell Manor City and Weymouth Township as part of sending/receiving relationships with the respective school districts.

As of the 2020–21 school year, the district, comprised of five schools, had an enrollment of 1,691 students and 150.0 classroom teachers (on an FTE basis), for a student–teacher ratio of 11.3:1. Schools in the district (with 2020–21 enrollment data from the National Center for Education Statistics) are Collings Lakes Elementary School with 197 students in grades K-2, John C. Milanesi Elementary School with 259 students in grades PreK-2, Dr. J.P. Cleary Elementary School with 309 students in grades 3-5, Buena Regional Middle School with 336 students in grades 6-8 and Buena Regional High School with 535 students in grades 9-12.

Borough public school students are also eligible to attend the Atlantic County Institute of Technology in the Mays Landing section of Hamilton Township or the Charter-Tech High School for the Performing Arts, located in Somers Point.

Founded in 1959, St. Augustine Preparatory School is an all-male Catholic high school, operated under the jurisdiction of the Roman Catholic Diocese of Camden.

== Transportation ==
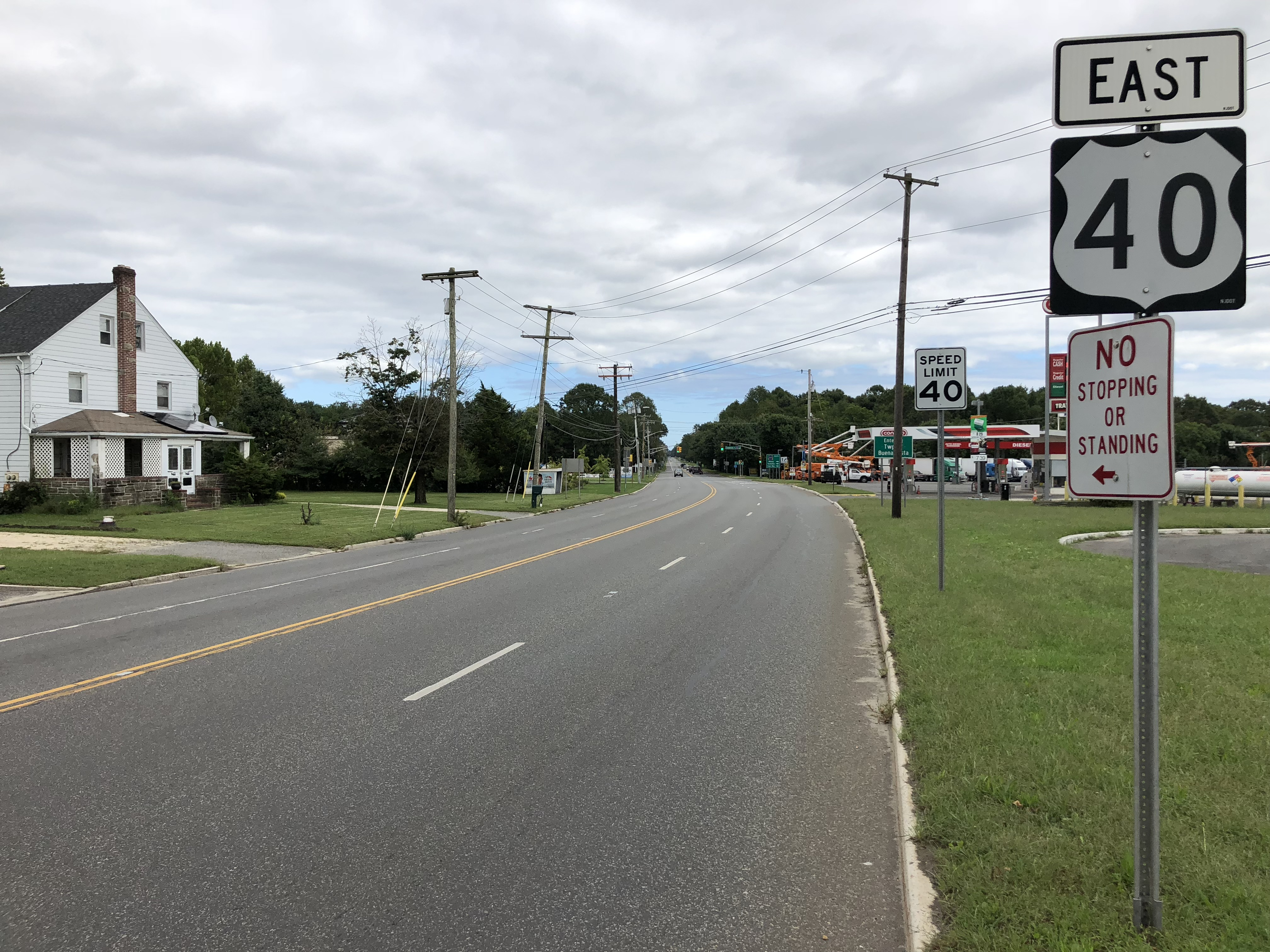
U.S. Route 40 eastbound in Buena Vista Township

=== Roads and highways ===
As of May 2010, the township had a total of 121.52 miles (195.57 km) of roadways, of which 90.65 miles (145.89 km) were maintained by the municipality, 21.27 miles (34.23 km) by Atlantic County and 9.60 miles (15.45 km) by the New Jersey Department of Transportation.

The main highways serving Buena Vista Township include U.S. Route 40, which runs from Buena southeastward across the township to Hamilton Township. Route 54 also crosses the township, starting at U.S. Route 40 at the Buena border and continuing northeastward across the township to Folsom.

The closest limited access roads are Route 55 in neighboring Franklin Township and Vineland, as well as the Atlantic City Expressway in Hamilton Township.

=== Public transportation ===
NJ Transit provides service between the Atlantic City Bus Terminal in Atlantic City and Upper Deerfield Township on the 553 route.

== Notable people ==
People who were born in, residents of, or otherwise closely associated with Buena Vista Township include:

- John Armato (born 1948), politician who has represented the 2nd Legislative District in the New Jersey Assembly since 2018, after serving three years on the Buena Vista Township Committee
- Hope Sawyer Buyukmihci (1913–2001), wildlife conservationist
- Olivia Lux (born 1994), drag performer most known for competing on season 13 of RuPaul's Drag Race
- Clifford Morgan (1915–1976), psychologist whose research was in the fields of physiological and experimental psychology
- Tony Siscone (born 1950), race car driver
