= Convent of the Sacred Heart =

Convent of the Sacred Heart may refer to:

- Convent of the Sacred Heart (Connecticut), Greenwich, Connecticut
- Convent of the Sacred Heart (New York), New York, New York
- Convent of the Sacred Heart High School (British Columbia), Vancouver, British Columbia
- Convent of the Sacred Heart High School (California), San Francisco, California
- Convent of the Sacred Heart National Primary School, Melaka
- Convent of the Sacred Heart, Brighton, now Cardinal Newman Catholic School, Hove
- Convent of the Sacred Heart, Wellington, later Erskine College, Wellington

== See also ==
- Sacred Heart school (disambiguation)
- Sacred Heart (disambiguation)
