= Holy Virgin Protection skete (Buena Vista Township) =

Male skete in New Jersey, United States

Coordinates: 39.539688°N 74.898231°W

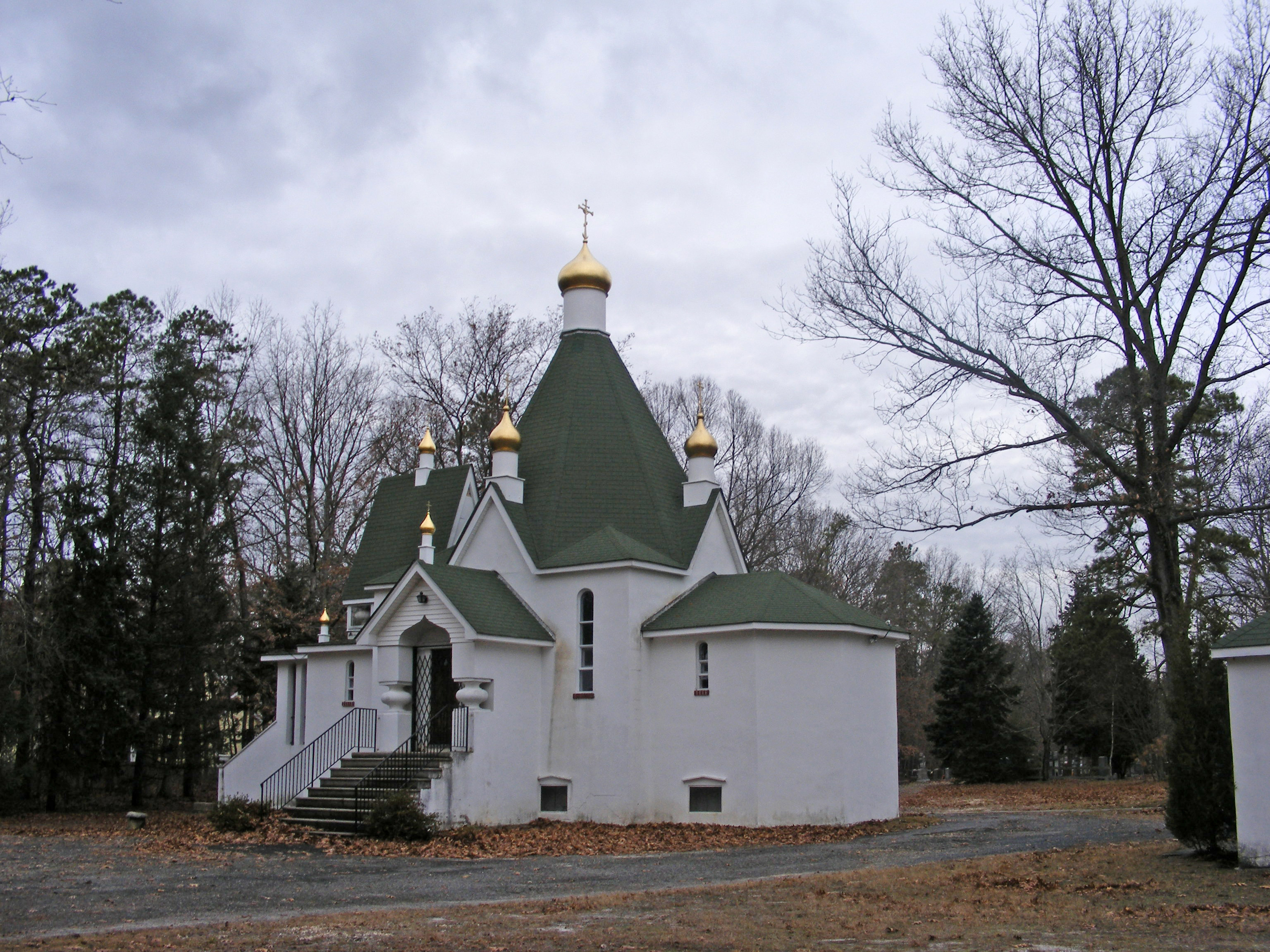

The Hermitage Of The Holy Protection (Russian: Покровский скит) is a male skete under ROCOR. The rector is Metropolitan Nicholas (Olhovsky).

Founded in 1953 as parish church of Protection of Our Most Holy Lady Theotokos in Cossack settlement New Kuban. The revival of the parish began after the transformation of the parish Church to The Hermitage of The Holy Protection (The Skete) in August 2015. Since 2016, the Skete celebrations are held every Sunday and holidays.

The Skete is home to Orthodox Christian cemetery. The brethren care for the grounds and tombstones, and those who wish can purchase land for family burial.

== History ==
In 1953 parish of Holy Protection of the Mother of God was established, consisting primarily of Russian people who could not conceive of life and activities without their Orthodox traditions

Construction of Holy Protection Church began in 1953 with the blessing and direct participation of Archbishop Nikon (Rklitsky) of Washington & Florida. In November 1963, priest Nikolai Nekliudoff was appointed rector of the Church. In early 1964, a parish school and library were organized at the church, and a cemetery founded on the parish grounds. Frescoes for the church were completed by the renowned iconographer of the Russian Diaspora, Archimandrite Cyprian (Pyzhov) of Holy Trinity Monastery in Jordanville, NY, while the iconostasis was the work of layman Dmitry Alexandrow (later Bishop Daniel of Erie). A bell-tower with five bells acquired from Rhodesia (Africa) was built, where particularly melodious bells were made. The Cossack church became a place where hundreds of Cossack refugees would gather and work tirelessly to preserve their traditions and way of life.

In the years to follow, the church nourished not only "New Kuban", but also surrounding towns.

As the years went by, the Cossacks aged and the younger generations moved away. For many years after the repose of Archpriest Nikolai Nekludoff – in 2004, the divine services were held very rarely, and the parish was placed under the supervision of Archpriest Liubo Milosevich of the neighboring Holy Trinity Church in Vineland. After Archpriest Nikolai Nekludoff's death his widow Adelaida Nekludoff has led prayer services. When he wasn't replaced, parishioners opted to attend Orthodox churches nearby rather than hear Mrs. Nekludoff read.

The peace and tranquility of the surroundings of the church and, with time, the decreasing number of active parishioners, has led to the realization that this location is an ideal spot for the establishment of a small monastic community. In August 2015, Metropolitan Hilarion (Kapral) signed a directive organizing The Skete at the former parish. The property of the Church was transferred to The Hermitage of the Holy Protection. For the community’s spiritual nourishment and rebirth, Abbot Tikhon (Gayfudinov) was assigned as rector of The Skete.

In October 14, 2015 (the feast of the Protection of the Mother of God) the festal Divine Liturgy was celebrated by Very Reverend Abbot Tikhon (Gayfudinov), rector of The Skete, and representatives of other parishes: archpriest Serge Lukianov, Priest Anatoly Revitskyy, Priest Eugene Solodky, Protodeacon Leonid Roschko, and Deacon Dimitri Krenitsky. Faithful from Washington, New York, and New Jersey gathered at the Skete for the patronal feast day. A festal luncheon was then served for the clergy and faithful.

During the first week of Great Lent of 2016, by the invitation of Rector V.R. Abbot Tikhon, Metropolitan Hilarion visited The Skete. On Wednesday the 16th and Thursday the 17th of March, he led the reading of the Great Penitential Canon of St. Andrew of Crete, co-served by skete rector Abbot Tikhon (Gayfudinov). This was the first hierarchal service in the skete in the past 25 years, since Metropolitan Vitaly (Ustinov) served there.
