= Sacred Heart Elementary (Carbondale) =

Coordinates: 41.57965°N 75.50383°W

Sacred Heart Elementary School

Location
- 27 Farview Street 33; Carbondale, Pennsylvania 18407; United States

Information
- School type: Parochial Elementary School
- Denomination: Roman Catholic
- Closed: June 2011
- Grades: PreK-8
- Campus type: Urban
- Colors: Blue and Gold
- Mascot: Crusader

Sacred Heart Elementary School was a Roman Catholic elementary school that formed in 2000 on the west side of Carbondale, Pennsylvania (U.S.), on Farview Street. It was the result of a merger between St. Rose Elementary School and Mt. Carmel Elementary School. The school team was called the Crusaders, with team colors of Blue and Gold. As of 2010-2011, Sacred Heart enrolled 187 students in grades PreK through 8, with student/teacher ratio: 11.98. The school was associated with the National Catholic Educational Association (NCEA).

Most graduates have attended Holy Cross High School (Pennsylvania) or Carbondale Area High School for high-school classes. For the 2011-2012 school year, Sacred Heart was closed and integrated into the LaSalle Academy Catholic School, located in Dickson City and Jessup.

== History ==
The two schools which combined to make up the newly named Sacred Heart Elementary School were formed in the 1800s and were located less than a mile (1.6 km) from each other. St. Rose Elementary was formed in 1871 and was part of the St Rose of Lima Parish, which had a large Irish immigrant population. Our Lady of Mt. Carmel Elementary was formed in 1892 and was part of the Our Lady of Mt. Carmel Parish which had a large Italian immigrant population. Originally, both elementary schools enjoyed a large enrollment, and the teachers of both elementary schools were exclusively nuns. Both schools housed a convent for the nuns who taught and ran each school. In 1921, St. Rose, then the larger of the two, expanded and built a high school, as St. Rose High School. In 1954, a new high school was built on the corner of 7th Avenue and N. Church Street. In 1963, Mt. Carmel Elementary built a new school on Farview Street, which served as the final school site.

=== Consolidations ===
In 1997, the school system was reorganized in Carbondale. The two elementary schools, St. Rose and Mt. Carmel Elementary, combined to form one school system called Sacred Heart Elementary School, which operated out of both original school sites. St. Rose High was renamed Sacred Heart High School. Grades PreK-2 were in the St. Rose Elementary building, and grades 3–6 were in the Mt. Carmel building, with grades 7–12 in the high-school building located near St Rose Parish. In 2000, grades PreK-2 were relocated to the Mt. Carmel building, and grades 4–6 were moved to the high school and operated separately from the high school as Sacred Heart Intermediate. The St. Rose Elementary building remains vacant to this day, except for Catechism classes on Sunday.

=== Loss of the High School ===
The 2004–2005 school year was the last operating year for Sacred Heart Intermediate and Sacred Heart High. The newly instated Bishop Martino decided to close grades 9–12 due to a debt and low enrollment which always occurred in the transition from sixth grade to seventh grade, during which over 50% of the students would leave. Those students transferred to the public high school, which had a more competitive program with activities and curricular strengths, neither of which Sacred Heart's high school could compete with, only having 90–130 students during the last years. Despite a campaign run by the school which raised the entire $250,000 debt in pledges in a mere two weeks, the bishop's decision remained final, and the school closed in June 2005. The last graduation ceremony was held in the auditorium/gym and graduated 14 students.

== Closure ==
Sacred Heart Elementary School closed at the end of the 2010-2011 school year, with its students being incorporated into LaSalle Academy. With the elementary school's closure, over one century of formal Catholic education in Carbondale was brought to a close. The building housed the Fell Charter School for the 2012-2013, and the building has since remained vacant.
