= Sacred Heart Academy =

Sacred Heart Academy may refer to various institutions:

in the United States:

- Sacred Heart Academy (Redlands, California)
- Sacred Heart Academy (Hamden, Connecticut)
- Sacred Heart Academy (Stamford, Connecticut)
- Sacred Heart Academy (Louisville), Louisville, Kentucky
- Sacred Heart Academy (New York), Hempstead, New York
- Sacred Heart Academy (Cincinnati, Ohio)
- Sacred Heart Academy High School (Mt. Pleasant, Michigan)
- Sacred Heart Academy Bryn Mawr, Pennsylvania
- Sacred Hearts Academy, Hawai'i
- Academy of the Sacred Heart, Grand Coteau, Louisiana
- Academy of the Sacred Heart (New Orleans, Louisiana)
- Academy of the Sacred Heart, Bloomfield Hills, Michigan
- Woodlands Academy of the Sacred Heart, Lake Forest, Illinois
- Buffalo Academy of the Sacred Heart, Amherst, New York
- Flintridge Sacred Heart Academy, La Canada, California

Elsewhere:

- Sacred Heart Academy of Santa Maria Bulacan, Santa Maria, Bulacan, Philippines

== See also ==
- Sacred Heart school (disambiguation)
- Sacred Heart Seminary (disambiguation)
- Sacred Heart (disambiguation)
