= Sacred Heart College =

Sacred Heart College may refer to:

== Australia ==
- Sacred Heart College, Ballarat, a former Catholic all girls secondary school in Ballarat
- Sacred Heart College, Geelong, a Catholic school for girls in Victoria
- Sacred Heart College, Kyneton, a Catholic co-ed Secondary School run by the Sisters of Mercy
- Sacred Heart College Middle School, a Marist all-boys middle school in South Australia
- Sacred Heart College, New Town, a co-educational school in Hobart, Tasmania
- Sacred Heart College (Adelaide), a Marist co-educational senior school in South Australia
- Sacred Heart College, Sorrento, a Catholic co-educational secondary school in Western Australia
- Sacred Heart Girls' College, Oakleigh, Melbourne, a Catholic school for girls in Victoria
- Sacred Heart Primary School, Kew, Victoria, a Catholic co-educational school

== Belize ==
- Sacred Heart College, Cayo, a High School and Junior College in San Ignacio, Cayo District

== Hong Kong ==
- Sacred Heart Canossian College

== India ==
- Sacred Heart College, Thevara, Kerala

== New Zealand ==
- Sacred Heart College, Auckland, a Catholic Marist boys' school in Glendowie, Auckland
- Sacred Heart College, Christchurch, a Catholic secondary school for girls
- Sacred Heart College, Lower Hutt, a Catholic secondary school for girls
- Sacred Heart College, Napier, a Catholic secondary school for girls
- Sacred Heart Girls' College, Hamilton, a Catholic secondary school for girls
- Sacred Heart Girls' College, New Plymouth, a Catholic secondary school for girls

== Philippines ==
- Sacred Heart College, Lucena City, Quezon Province

== South Africa ==
- Sacred Heart College, Johannesburg

== United Kingdom ==
=== England ===
- Sacred Heart Catholic College, in Crosby, Merseyside, England

=== Northern Ireland ===
- Sacred Heart College, Omagh

== United States ==
- Sacred Heart College, now called Jesuit High School (Tampa), Florida
- Sacred Heart College, now called Newman University, Wichita, Kansas
- Sacred Heart College, now part of Belmont Abbey College, North Carolina
- Sacred Heart College (Wisconsin), a Jesuit-run college in Prairie du Chien

== See also ==
- College of the Sacred Heart (disambiguation)
- Sacred Heart (disambiguation)
- Sacred Heart High School (disambiguation)
