= Sacred Heart School (Langton) =

Sacred Heart

Location
- 26 Albert Street, PO Box 70; Langton, Ontario, N0E 1G0; Canada; 42.740866°N 80.580447°W

Information
- School type: Catholic Elementary School
- Motto: Freedom With Responsibility
- Religious affiliation: Catholic
- Founded: 1939
- School board: Brant Haldimand Norfolk Catholic District School Board
- School number: 759309
- Principal: Shannon Mason
- Grades: JK-8
- Enrollment
- Language: English
- Website: www.sacredheartlangton.ca

Sacred Heart School is a Roman Catholic elementary school in Norfolk County, Ontario, Canada. Courses there are taught with English as the primary language, with French language classes taught to students in grade 1 through 8. Learning about the Roman Catholic faith is mandatory.
