= Sacred Heart School (Bethlehem) =

Coordinates: 40.6412°N 75.3307°W

Location
- 1814 Second Street; Bethlehem, Pennsylvania 18020-5606; United States

Information
- Denomination: Roman Catholic
- Principal: Mr. Jack Schulte
- Head teacher: Mrs. Kathy Bondi
- Teaching staff: 20 (as of 2007-08)
- Grades: PK-8
- Enrollment: 224 (as of 2007-08)
- Student to teacher ratio: 9.6 (as of 2007-08)
- Colors: Red and Black
- Slogan: 50 Years of Service, Education and Faith
- Mascot: Falcon
- Website: http://www.sachrtschool.com/

Sacred Heart School is a Catholic private elementary school in the Roman Catholic Diocese of Allentown, in Bethlehem, Pennsylvania, United States.

== Extracurricular activities ==
Student groups and activities include academic bowl, altar serving, band, choir, CYO, Math Counts, one-act play, Scouting, spelling bee, student council, talent show, and yearbook. Sports include basketball, cheerleading, cross country, football, track & field, and volleyball.
