= Sacred Heart School (Hampton, New Hampshire) =

Coordinates: 42°56′10″N 70°50′12″W

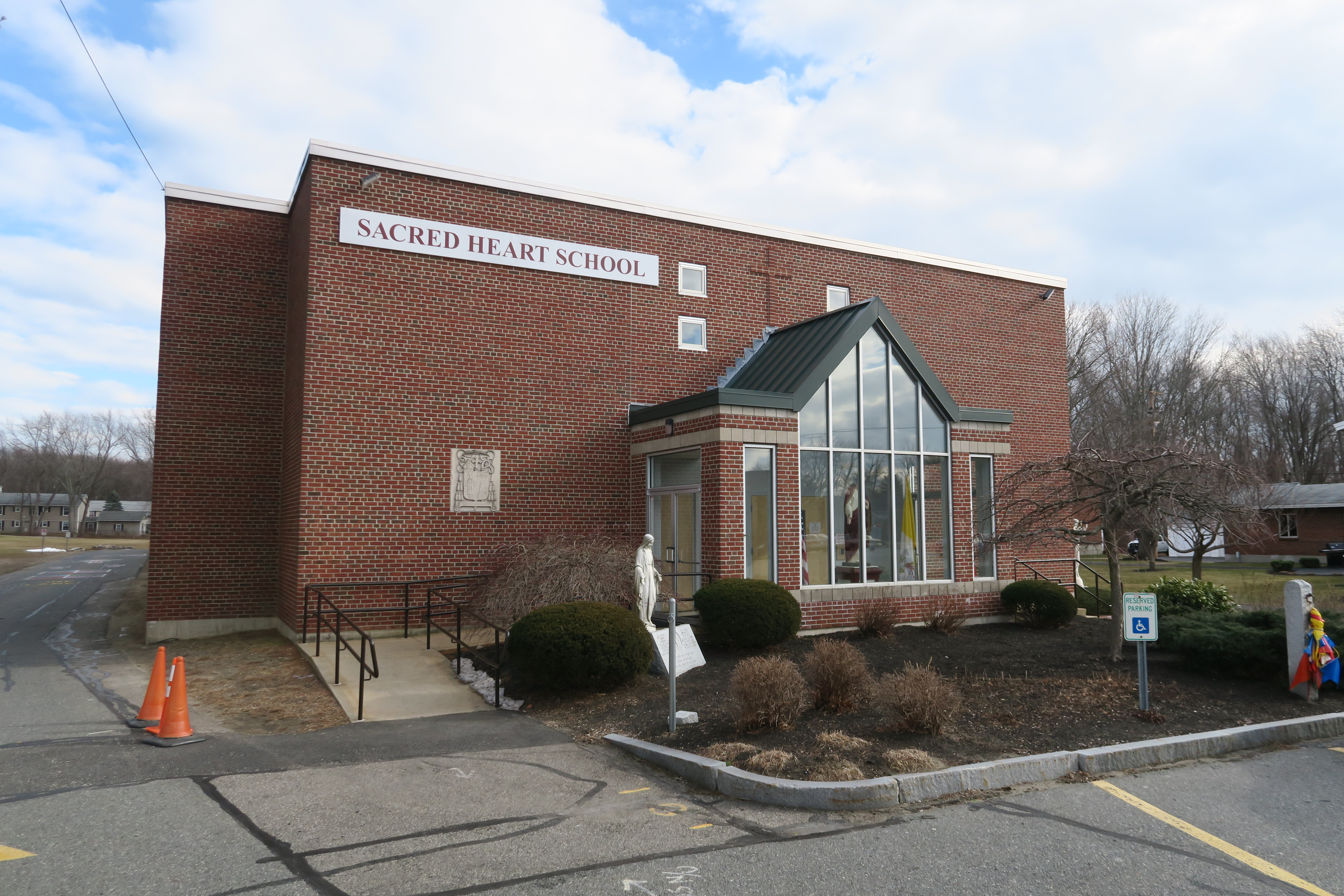
Sacred Heart School

Sacred Heart School of Hampton, New Hampshire is a Catholic school under the Diocese of Manchester. It is the parish school for Our Lady of the Miraculous Medal Parish, also in Hampton. This school serves grades pre-kindergarten through eighth grade.

== History ==
Sacred Heart School was founded in September 1963 for families attending Our Lady of the Miraculous Medal Parish. Initially, Sacred Heart School only served grades four and five. Each year it added one more grade until the first class graduated in 1967. Through the 1970s the school flourished, with a maximum enrollment of over 250 students. In 1984, Sacred Heart added a part-time kindergarten under the guidance of the new principal. In 1994, the kindergarten became full-time. Currently, there are 244 students enrolled in grades pre-kindergarten through eight. Its current principal is Maegan Koelker, holding the position since July 2021.
