= Sacred Heart Medical Center =

Sacred Heart Medical Center may refer to:

In the United States:

- Sacred Heart Medical Center at RiverBend, Springfield, Oregon
- Sacred Heart Medical Center University District, Eugene, Oregon
- Providence Sacred Heart Medical Center and Children's Hospital, Spokane, Washington

== See also ==
- Sacred Heart Hospital (disambiguation)
