= East Vineland, New Jersey =

Populated place in Atlantic County, New Jersey, US

- Census-designated place
- Location in Atlantic County Location in New Jersey Location in the United States
- Coordinates: 39°28′51″N 74°55′10″W
- Country: United States
- State: New Jersey
- County: Atlantic
- Township: Buena Vista

Area
  - Total: 5.03 sq mi (13.02 km^{2})
  - Land: 5.02 sq mi (12.99 km^{2})
  - Water: 0.012 sq mi (0.03 km^{2})
- Elevation: 105 ft (32 m)

Population (2020)
  - Total: 925
  - Density: 184.5/sq mi (71.22/km^{2})
- FIPS code: 34-19690
- GNIS feature ID: 876071

East Vineland is an unincorporated community and census-designated place (CDP) located within Buena Vista Township in Atlantic County, in the U.S. state of New Jersey.

As of the 2020 census, East Vineland had a population of 925.

== Demographics ==
Historical population
| Census | Pop. | Note | %± |
|---|---|---|---|
| 2020 | 925 | | — |
U.S. Decennial Census

East Vineland first appeared as a census designated place in the 2020 U.S. census.

East Vineland CDP, New Jersey – Racial and ethnic composition Note: the US Census treats Hispanic/Latino as an ethnic category. This table excludes Latinos from the racial categories and assigns them to a separate category. Hispanics/Latinos may be of any race.
| Race / Ethnicity (NH = Non-Hispanic) | Pop 2020 | 2020 |
|---|---|---|
| White alone (NH) | 795 | 85.95% |
| Black or African American alone (NH) | 20 | 2.16% |
| Native American or Alaska Native alone (NH) | 2 | 0.22% |
| Asian alone (NH) | 6 | 0.65% |
| Native Hawaiian or Pacific Islander alone (NH) | 1 | 0.11% |
| Other race alone (NH) | 2 | 0.22% |
| Mixed race or Multiracial (NH) | 30 | 3.24% |
| Hispanic or Latino (any race) | 69 | 7.46% |
| Total | 925 | 100.00% |

As of 2020, the population of the area was 925.

== Education ==
The CDP is in the Buena Regional School District.
