= Sacred Heart Hospital =

Sacred Heart Hospital may refer to:

In Ireland:

- Sacred Heart Hospital (Roscommon)

In Malta:

- a leprosarium which existed in Fort Chambray, Gozo from 1937 to 1956

In Nigeria:

- Sacred Heart Hospital, Ogun State, Nigeria

In the United States:

- Sacred Heart Children's Hospital, Pensacola, Florida
- Sacred Heart Hospital of Pensacola, Pensacola, Florida
- Sacred Heart Women's Hospital, Pensacola, Florida
- Sacred Heart Hospital on the Emerald Coast, West Destin, Florida
- Sacred Heart Hospital, Chicago, Illinois
- Sacred Heart Hospital (Le Mars, Iowa), listed on the NRHP in Plymouth County, Iowa
- Sacred Heart Hospital, Cumberland, Maryland
- Sacred Heart Hospital (Manchester, New Hampshire)
- Sacred Heart Medical Center at RiverBend, Springfield, Oregon
- Sacred Heart Medical Center University District, Eugene, Oregon
- Sacred Heart Hospital, Allentown, Pennsylvania
- Avera Sacred Heart Hospital, Yankton, South Dakota
- Providence Sacred Heart Medical Center and Children's Hospital, Spokane, Washington
- Sacred Heart Hospital, Eau Claire, Wisconsin permanently closed March 22, 2024.
- Sacred Heart Hospital, Tomahawk, Wisconsin

Fictional

- Sacred Heart Hospital (Scrubs), as seen on American sitcom TV series Scrubs

== See also ==
- Sacred Heart Medical Center (disambiguation)
