= Collings Lakes, New Jersey =

Populated place in Atlantic County, New Jersey, US

- Census-designated place
- Map of Collings Lakes CDP in Atlantic County. Inset: Location of Atlantic County in New Jersey.

- Location in Atlantic County Location in New Jersey Location in the United States
- Coordinates: 39.594668°N 74.888626°W
- Country: United States
- State: New Jersey
- County: Atlantic
- Township: Buena Vista

Area
  - Total: 0.70 sq mi (1.82 km^{2})
  - Land: 0.64 sq mi (1.66 km^{2})
  - Water: 0.062 sq mi (0.16 km^{2}) 8.88%
- Elevation: 79 ft (24 m)

Population (2020)
  - Total: 1,501
  - Density: 2,339.5/sq mi (903.29/km^{2})
- Time zone: UTC−05:00 (Eastern (EST))
  - Summer (DST): UTC−04:00 (EDT)
- ZIP Code: 08094
- Area code: 609
- FIPS code: 34-14230
- GNIS feature ID: 02389344
- Website: www.collingslakes.org

Collings Lakes is an unincorporated community and census-designated place (CDP) located within Buena Vista Township in Atlantic County, in the U.S. state of New Jersey. As of the 2020 census, Collings Lakes had a population of 1,501.

Collings Lakes is not an incorporated municipality, though homes in the neighborhood are subject to certain deed restrictions and to the Collings Lakes Civic Association. Homeowners are not required to become members of the Civic Association, nor are they required to comply with CLCA bylaws. Homeowners are required to pay an annual tiered fee for "maintenance of lakes, dams and beaches". Membership in the CLCA is voluntary per New Jersey Superior Court ruling on September 15, 2006.

== Geography ==
According to the United States Census Bureau, the CDP had a total area of 0.701 square miles (1.82 km^{2}), including 0.639 square miles (1.66 km^{2}) of land and 0.062 square miles (0.16 km^{2}) of water (8.88%).

== Demographics ==
Historical population
| Census | Pop. | Note | %± |
|---|---|---|---|
| 1980 | 2,093 | | — |
| 1990 | 2,046 | | −2.2% |
| 2000 | 1,726 | | −15.6% |
| 2010 | 1,706 | | −1.2% |
| 2020 | 1,501 | | −12.0% |
Population sources: 1950 1960 1970; 1980 1990 2000; 2010 2020

Collins Lakes first appeared as a census designated place in the 1980 U.S. census.

=== 2020 census ===
Collings Lakes CDP, New Jersey – Racial and ethnic composition Note: the US Census treats Hispanic/Latino as an ethnic category. This table excludes Latinos from the racial categories and assigns them to a separate category. Hispanics/Latinos may be of any race.
| Race / Ethnicity (NH = Non-Hispanic) | Pop 2000 | Pop 2010 | Pop 2020 | % 2000 | % 2010 | % 2020 |
|---|---|---|---|---|---|---|
| White alone (NH) | 1,479 | 1,370 | 1,164 | 85.69% | 80.30% | 77.55% |
| Black or African American alone (NH) | 66 | 89 | 64 | 3.82% | 5.22% | 4.26% |
| Native American or Alaska Native alone (NH) | 5 | 1 | 0 | 0.29% | 0.06% | 0.00% |
| Asian alone (NH) | 5 | 10 | 10 | 0.29% | 0.59% | 0.67% |
| Native Hawaiian or Pacific Islander alone (NH) | 0 | 2 | 0 | 0.00% | 0.12% | 0.00% |
| Other race alone (NH) | 0 | 5 | 5 | 0.00% | 0.29% | 0.33% |
| Mixed race or Multiracial (NH) | 24 | 36 | 81 | 1.39% | 2.11% | 5.40% |
| Hispanic or Latino (any race) | 147 | 193 | 177 | 8.52% | 11.31% | 11.79% |
| Total | 1,726 | 1,706 | 1,501 | 100.00% | 100.00% | 100.00% |

=== 2010 census ===
The 2010 United States census counted 1,706 people, 575 households, and 442 families in the CDP. The population density was 2,669.9 people per square mile (1,030.9 people/km^{2}). There were 605 housing units at an average density of 946.8 units per square mile (365.6 units/km^{2}). The racial makeup was 86.23% (1,471) White, 5.98% (102) Black or African American, 0.53% (9) Native American, 0.59% (10) Asian, 0.12% (2) Pacific Islander, 3.11% (53) from other races, and 3.46% (59) from two or more races. Hispanic or Latino of any race were 11.31% (193) of the population.

Of the 575 households, 33.2% had children under the age of 18; 58.4% were married couples living together; 14.1% had a female householder with no husband present and 23.1% were non-families. Of all households, 17.7% were made up of individuals and 4.3% had someone living alone who was 65 years of age or older. The average household size was 2.97 and the average family size was 3.38.

25.3% of the population were under the age of 18, 9.4% from 18 to 24, 25.5% from 25 to 44, 29.2% from 45 to 64, and 10.6% who were 65 years of age or older. The median age was 38.3 years. For every 100 females, the population had 97.2 males. For every 100 females ages 18 and older there were 92.0 males.

=== 2000 census ===
As of the 2000 United States census there were 1,726 people, 564 households, and 463 families residing in the CDP. The population density was 994.6 people/km^{2} (2,576 people/mi^{2}). There were 596 housing units at an average density of 343.5 units/km^{2} (890 units/mi^{2}). The racial makeup of the CDP was 88.76% White, 4.11% African American, 0.29% Native American, 0.29% Asian, 4.58% from other races, and 1.97% from two or more races. Hispanic or Latino of any race were 8.52% of the population.

There were 564 households, out of which 39.7% had children under the age of 18 living with them, 61.7% were married couples living together, 13.8% had a female householder with no husband present, and 17.9% were non-families. 13.1% of all households were made up of individuals, and 4.8% had someone living alone who was 65 years of age or older. The average household size was 3.06 and the average family size was 3.29.

In the CDP the population was spread out, with 28.2% under the age of 18, 9.0% from 18 to 24, 31.4% from 25 to 44, 24.5% from 45 to 64, and 6.9% who were 65 years of age or older. The median age was 34 years. For every 100 females, there were 100.2 males. For every 100 females age 18 and over, there were 95.9 males.

The median income for a household in the CDP was $51,042, and the median income for a family was $51,083. Males had a median income of $36,346 versus $25,924 for females. The per capita income for the CDP was $17,903. About 6.3% of families and 8.6% of the population were below the poverty line, including 16.0% of those under age 18 and 8.5% of those age 65 or over.

== Education ==
The CDP is in the Buena Regional School District.
