= Sacred Heart High School (Pennsylvania) =

Private Catholic school in Carbondale, Pennsylvania

- Carbondale, Pennsylvania

Information
- Type: Private, Coeducational
- Religious affiliation: Roman Catholic
- Established: 1950
- Closed: 2005
- Grades: 9-12
- Colors: Blue and Gold
- Team name: Crusaders

Sacred Heart High School was a Roman Catholic Junior/Senior high school in Carbondale, Pennsylvania. It was formerly known as St. Rose. By order of Bishop Martino, grades 9–12 were closed in June 2005.

The school’s mascot was the Crusader, and the school’s colors were blue and gold. The school had other mascots in its era: The Hilltoppers and the Roses. The students of the school voted to change the mascot from the Roses to the Crusaders in late 1992.

== Early history ==
The school opened in 1876 as St. Rose Academy on top of Salem Avenue in Carbondale, Pennsylvania. The school was located at the Brennan Estate, a large Victorian-style mansion at the top of Salem Avenue. At the time, the Brennan Estate also housed the novitiate for the Sisters Servants of the Immaculate Heart of Mary (IHM). In 1902, the novitiate was moved to Marywood in Scranton. Due to rising enrollment, a two story extension was added to the Estate building in 1915, and the school became co-ed in 1926. Eventually, Saint Rose Academy became St. Rose High School and the sisters educated children from grades one through twelve. A school of nursing occupied part of the Estate building, along with the living quarters of the IHM sisters; grades four, five, six, and eight occupied the building on the first floor. The extension housed grades one, two, three and seven on the first floor and grades nine through twelve on the second floor. In 1950, a large, modern school was built on the corner of South Church Street and Seventh Avenue as St. Rose High School. It housed grades kindergarten through 12th grade. As the school continued to grow, a new convent and an Annex building were constructed behind St. Rose of Lima Church and became the new home for the IHM sisters and the school portion housed the primary grades. Along with students from Carbondale, the new school attracted students from Archbald, Jermyn, Mayfield, Childs, Simpson, Vandling and Forest City, as well as a small number of students from St. Vincent Elementary located in Honesdale, Pennsylvania. The high school had over 275 students at its peak in the 1956-1957 school year. In the early years, the school colors were blue and white and after the new school was built in 1950, the colors were changed to royal blue and gold. The years from the late 1940s through the 1950s and later in the 1970s were years of basketball excellence for St. Rose.

== Consolidation and decline ==
In 1977, St. Rose High School was renamed Sacred Heart High School. Mt. Carmel Elementary and St. Rose Elementary were consolidated and renamed as Sacred Heart Elementary for the 2000-2001 school year. Grades PreK–3 were housed in the Mt. Carmel building, while grades 4–6 were moved to the high school and designated as Sacred Heart Intermediate, which mostly operated as a separate entity, not under the jurisdiction of the administration of the high school section. The St. Rose building was vacated and is empty to this day, only being used for Sunday Catechism classes.

== Final year ==
The 2004–2005 school year was the last operating year for Sacred Heart Intermediate and Sacred Heart High. The newly enstated Bishop Martino decided to close grades 9–12 due to a massive debt and low enrollment. Despite a campaign run by the school which raised the entire $250,000 debt in pledges in a mere two weeks, the bishop's decision remained final, and the school closed in June 2005. The last graduation ceremony was held in St. Rose of Lima Church and graduated 23 students. Grades 4–8 were relocated to Sacred Heart Elementary (Carbondale).

== Demolition ==
The building that formerly housed Sacred Heart Intermediate and Sacred Heart High is slated for demolition beginning Monday, April 25, 2022. In October 2023, developers were looking for approval to convert the property into a 28-bed drug and alcohol detoxification facility.
