= Jules Chevalier =

French Roman Catholic priest

Servant of God Jules Chevalier MSC
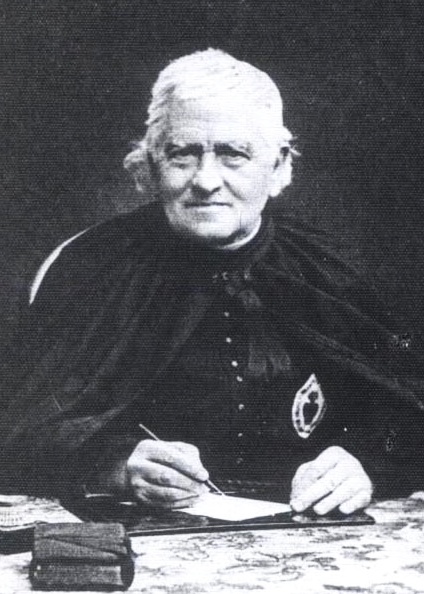
- Jules Chevalier
- Born: 15 March 1824; Richelieu, Touraine, France
- Died: 21 October 1907 (aged 83); Issoudun, Indre, France

Jules Chevalier, MSC (15 March 1824 – 21 October 1907) was a French Catholic priest and founder of the Missionaries of the Sacred Heart, the Daughters of Our Lady of the Sacred Heart, the Missionary Sisters of the Sacred Heart, along with their lay associates, known collectively as the Chevalier Family.

== Biography ==
Born in Richelieu, France, Chevalier was initially apprenticed as a shoemaker at age 12 after he was told his parents could not afford to send him to the seminary. He was later able to join the seminary, after his father's boss sponsored him and at the age of 30 was sent to the parish of Issoudun.

In 1854 he founded the religious institute of the Missionaries of the Sacred Heart, and in 1874 the Daughters of Our Lady of the Sacred Heart. Later came the Missionary Sisters of the Sacred Heart, along with their lay associates. Together with the other orders, they are known collectively as the Chevalier Family.

Chevalier claimed a Marian apparition and titled it as Our Lady of the Sacred Heart. The image was crowned by Pope Pius IX in 1869 and her sanctuary raised to the status of minor basilica in 1874.

He died in 1907 and later became an official candidate for sainthood, gaining the title Servant of God.
