= Our Lady of the Sacred Heart =

Marian title

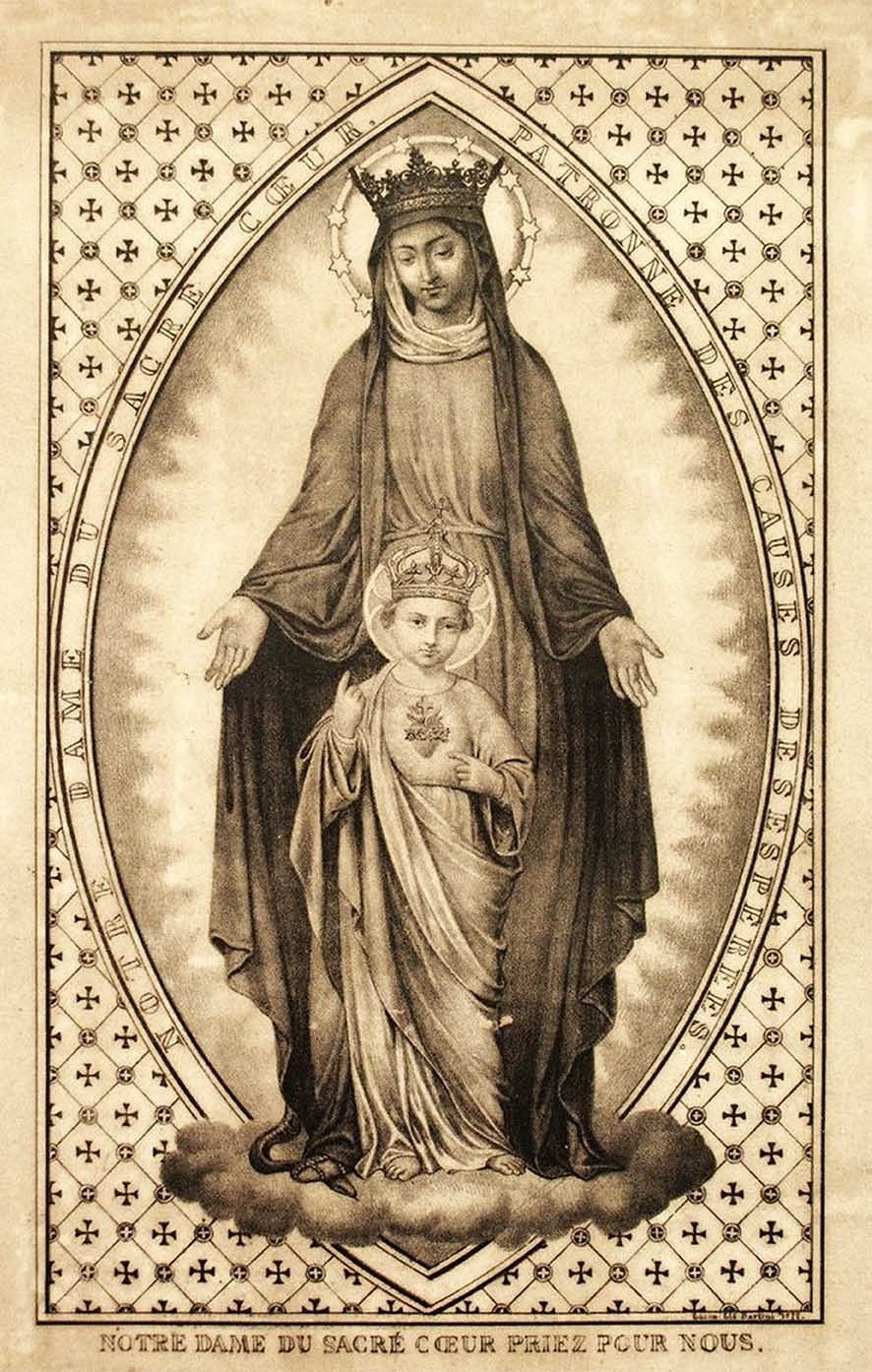
- Our Lady of the Sacred Heart
- Location: Issoudun, France
- Date: 31 May
- Witness: Jules Chevalier
- Approval: Pope Pius IX
- Shrine: Basilica of Issoudun, France
- Patronage: difficult and desperate causes

Our Lady of the Sacred Heart is a title of the Blessed Virgin Mary. The origin of this Marian title goes back to Father Jules Chevalier, the founder of the Missionaries of the Sacred Heart.

== History ==
In 1854, in Issoudun, during the novena of the Immaculate Conception, Father Jules Chevalier promised that if his dream of forming a missionary congregation in honor of the Sacred Heart of Jesus comes true, he will teach the faithful to love the Virgin Mary in a peculiar way. The congregation would consider Mary as her foundress and her sovereign, and they will associate her with all her works.

During various novenas made to the Virgin Mary, Fr. Chevalier obtained several financial donations that allowed him to build the Basilica of Our Lady of the Sacred Heart in Issoudun, and in 1857 he consolidated his congregation and henceforth venerated Mary under the title of Our Lady of the Sacred Heart.

Article III – In testimony of gratitude to Mary, they will consider her as their Founder and Sovereign, they will associate her with all her works and they will make her love in a peculiar way.

— Chevalier's promise with Virgin Mary

== Iconography ==
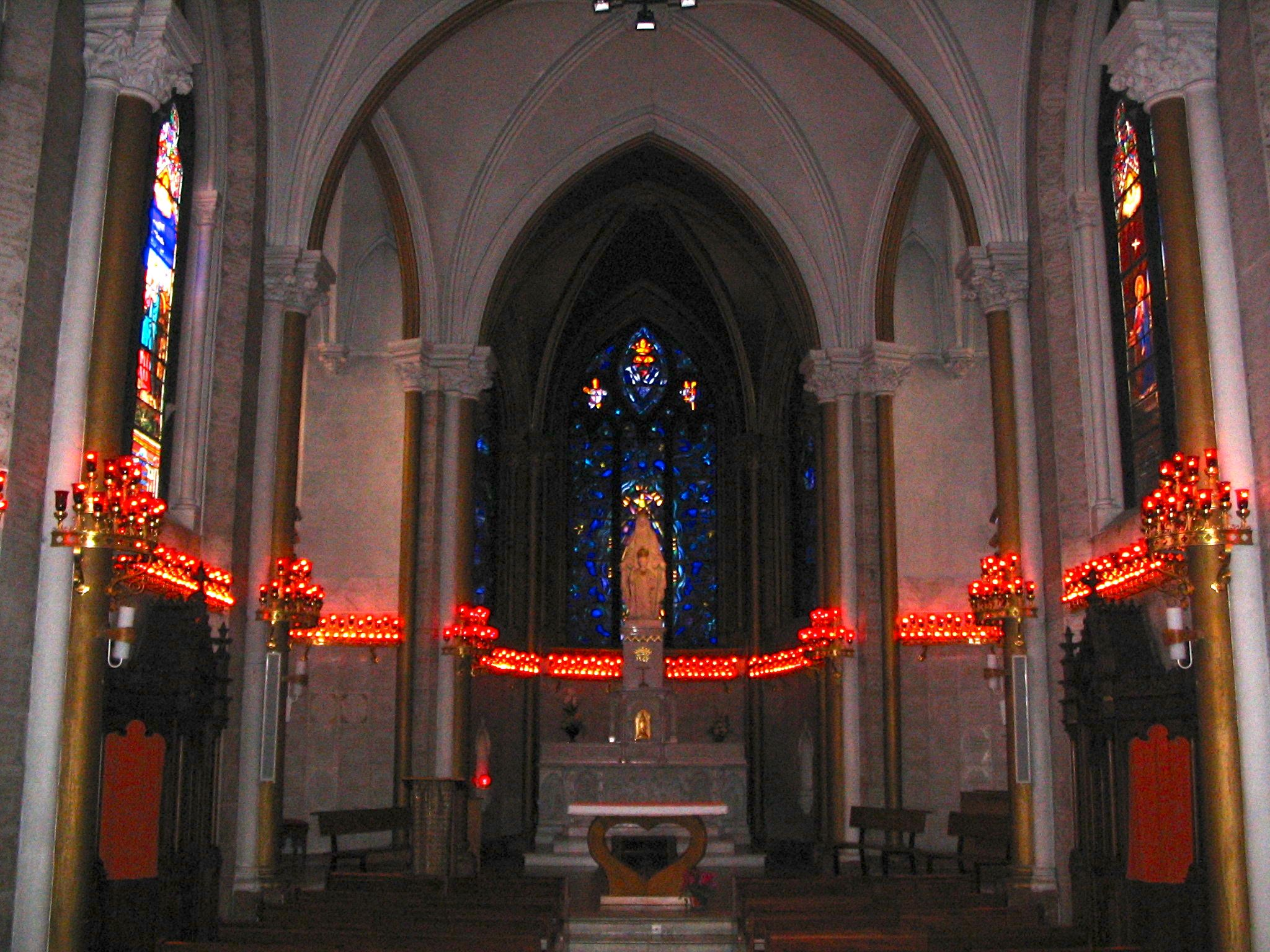
The stained glass window of Our Lady of the Sacred Heart in Issoudun

In 1861, Fr. Chevalier had a stained glass window made, where Mary and Jesus appear standing, the child touches his heart with his left hand and with his right hand points to his mother on high, sending the message that through Mary the faithful can reach the Most Sacred Heart of Jesus.

In 1868, Pope Pius IX blessed a couple of crowns which are placed in the stained glass window of Our Lady of the Sacred Heart, and the congregation became an archconfraternity.

In 1874, Pope Pius IX raised the sanctuary to the status of a Minor Basilica. Pope Benedict XV granted a second decree of coronation of the image in 1919.

At the end of the 19th century, the devotion to Our Lady of the Sacred Heart spread throughout America and Europe. The iconography of was slightly changed in the way that Jesus appears as a child in his mother's arms, while Mary showed the heart of her son.

In 1910, Pope Pius X granted a decree of coronation towards one of another image of Our Lady of the Sacred Heart which belongs to the Archconfraternity of the Our Lady of the Sacred Heart in Averbode Abbey, Belgium.
