= Our Lady of the Sacred Heart College, Sydney =

School in New South Wales, Australia

Our Lady of the Sacred Heart College
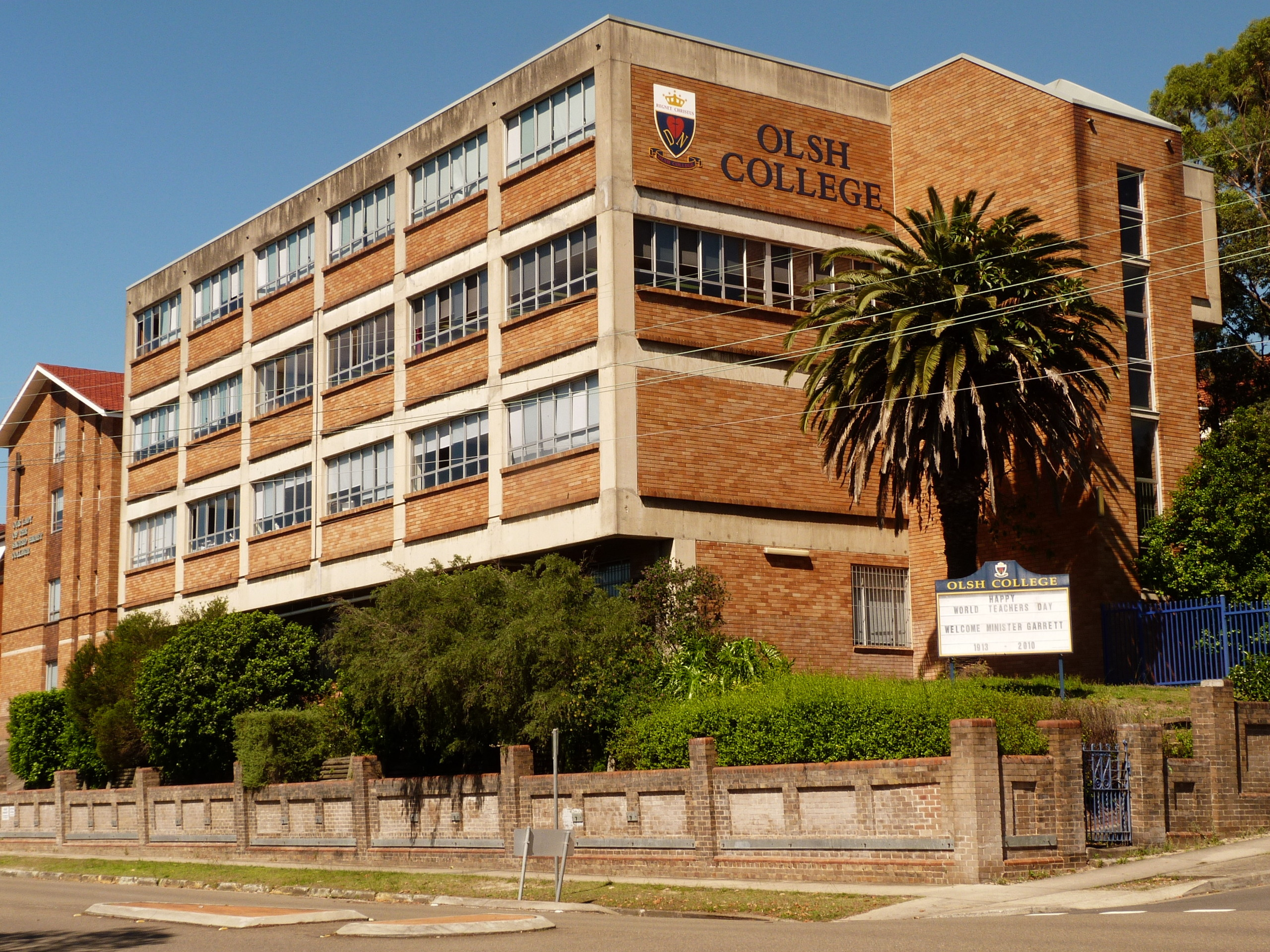

Location
- Kensington, Eastern Suburbs, Sydney, New South Wales; Australia
- 33°54′43″S 151°13′12″E

Information
- Type: Independent single-sex secondary day school
- Motto: May Christ Reign (Regnet Christus)
- Religious affiliation: Daughters of Our Lady of the Sacred Heart
- Denomination: Roman Catholicism
- Established: 1897
- Educational authority: New South Wales Department of Education
- Oversight: Catholic Education Office, Archdiocese of Sydney
- Principal: Gilda Pussich
- Years: 7–12
- Gender: Girls
- Enrolment: 823
- Colours: Navy and red
- Affiliation: Alliance of Girls' Schools Australasia
- Website: olshkensington.syd.catholic.edu.au

Our Lady of the Sacred Heart College (abbreviated as OLSH College) is an independent Roman Catholic single-sex secondary day school for girls, conducted in the traditions of the Daughters of Our Lady of the Sacred Heart, located in the eastern Sydney suburb of Kensington, New South Wales, Australia.

The College was founded in 1897 by members of the Daughters of Our Lady of the Sacred Heart, a religious congregation founded by Father Jules Chevalier in France in 1874. The College provides a religious and general education for approximately 800 girls from Year 7 to Year 12.

== History ==
The College was moved to the Kensington site in 1913 and until 1995 was administered by the Sisters. It is part of the system of schools under the auspices of the Catholic Education Office in the Archdiocese of Sydney.

At its opening, the college was an impoverished Catholic school, with little or no support from the government. As a result, the school's oldest structure, the Fyfe Wing, was not completed immediately, and construction stalled during 1914 when funds dried up. In 1915, the Franciscan friar Tony Macfarlane was assigned to teach mathematics and science at the school. Friar Tony Macfarlane had a strong background in carpentry and a brief career as a Civil Engineer prior to taking his vows as a monk. Friar Macfarlane took it upon himself to complete the construction of the school's main building, in an effort to remove classes from the OLSH convent next door. The OLSH nuns were involved in administration and some minor laboring work, with many parishioners volunteering their knowledge and labour time to help. The college was thus completed. The Fyfe Wing was listed as a heritage site in 1984.

== Academics ==
In 1918, the commercial subjects offered by the school included shorthand and bookkeeping.

In 1930, the school offered a range of subject preparing girls for public exams in English, English Literature, Latin, French, Ancient and Modern History, Apologetics, Mathematics I and II, Botany, Business Principles, Elocution, Art, Christian Doctrine, History, Bookkeeping, Sports, Geography, Religious Knowledge, Physical Culture, and Regular Attendance.

The school also prepared pupils to sit various music examinations.

== Activities ==
Every year, the school celebrates this achievement on the Feast of St Francis. The school holds a bake sale, with all proceeds going to missionaries in Papua New Guinea and housing projects in the Northern Territory.

== Location ==
The college's present location in Kensington makes it accessible from the city and close to the University of New South Wales. It draws most of its students from the immediate local area and from Brighton-Le-Sands/Sans Souci. It is surrounded by community resources and leisure facilities.

The campus is adjacent to the OLSH Provincial House, OLSH Convent and St Joseph's Aged Care Facility. It is near the Sacred Heart Monastery, Chevalier Resource Centre, and the parish church and primary college of Our Lady of the Rosary.

== Sister schools ==
The college has two sister schools of the same name, also founded by the Daughters of Our Lady of the Sacred Heart, one in Melbourne and the other in Adelaide. Each year exchange programs are run between the schools.

== Principals ==
- Rev. Father E. McAuliffe, P.P.
- Gilda Pussich, 2024-

== Notable alumni ==
- Deirdre Grusovin AM - politician, member for Heffron (1990-2003)
- Amber Lawrence - country music singer-songwriter
- Jessica Sergis - rugby league football player
- Adiana Talakai - rugby union player

== See also ==
- List of Catholic schools in New South Wales
- Catholic education in Australia
- Miletich, M. and Spurr, S. (2013). The College on the Hill: An Historical Narrative of Our Lady of the Sacred Heart College, Kensington 1913-2013. Sydney, Australia: Thoth Communications.
