= Our Lady of the Sacred Heart College, Adelaide =

Our Lady of the Sacred Heart College

Location
- 496 Regency Road, Enfield, South Australia; Australia
- 34.8734°S 138.60407°E

Information
- Type: Independent high school
- Motto: Regnet Christus (May Christ Reign)
- Religious affiliation: Sisters of Our Lady of the Sacred Heart
- Denomination: Roman Catholic
- Established: 1947
- Founder: Jules Chevalier
- Principal: Maria Urbano
- Chaplain: Tony Marshall
- Years: 7–12
- Gender: Girls
- Enrolment: 600 (2007)
- Campus: Enfield
- Colours: Blue, red, gold
- Website: www.olsh.catholic.edu.au

Our Lady of the Sacred Heart College is a Roman Catholic high school for girls located in the Adelaide suburb of Enfield, South Australia, Australia. It is situated on the corner on Regency Road, an offshoot of Main North Road.

The college was founded in 1947 by the Daughters of Our Lady of the Sacred Heart, members of a religious congregation founded by Father Jules Chevalier in France in 1874.

A senior campus was opened in 2009. It contains nine new classrooms, a laboratory, a home economics centre, a common room, a staff room and a canteen.

The college has two sister schools of the same name, also founded by the Daughters of Our Lady of the Sacred Heart, one in Melbourne, Sacred Heart Girls' College, Oakleigh and the other in Sydney, Our Lady of the Sacred Heart College, Kensignton. Each year exchange programs are run between the schools.
