= Sacred Heart Language College =

The Sacred Heart Roman Catholic Language College
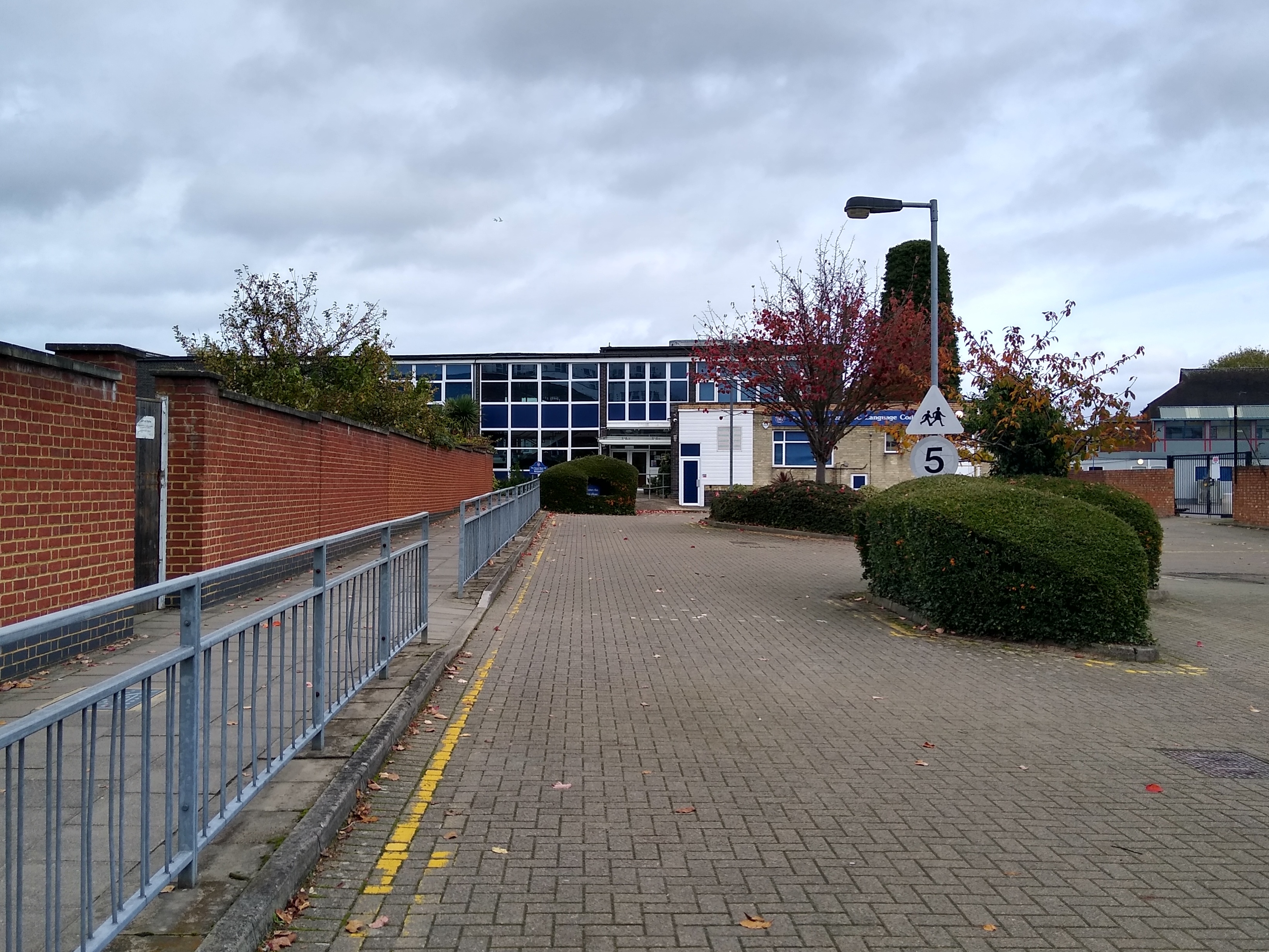

Location
- High Street; Wealdstone; London, HA3 7AY; England; 51.59952°N 0.336395°W

Information
- Type: Academy
- Religious affiliation: Roman Catholic
- Established: 1907
- Founder: Euphrasie Barbier
- Local authority: Harrow
- Trust: Blessed Holy Family Catholic Academy Trust
- Specialist: Language
- Department for Education URN: 146245 Tables
- Ofsted: Reports
- Headteacher: Geraldine Higgins
- Gender: Girls
- Age: 11 to 16
- Enrolment: 813
- Colours: Blue and Red
- Website: http://www.tshlc.harrow.sch.uk

The Sacred Heart Language College is a Roman Catholic secondary school for girls located in Wealdstone, London, England.

== History ==
Sacred Heart High School was founded in 1907 by the Sisters of St Chretienne who had fled religious persecution in their native France. The school taken over by the Sisters of Notre Dame des Missions in 1920 after the founding order returned to France. It was originally a boarding school for girls, although a small number of boys were admitted into the kindergarten. After World War I, the school, as with many Catholic schools in the country, faced financial struggles but remained open after much effort from pupils and staff to raise the necessary funds.

In 1957 it became a voluntary aided grammar school. In 1991 the first lay headteacher was appointed after long-serving headteacher Sister Anne Collette retired. During the 1990s, the school went through a tumultuous period during which pupil numbers and GCSE scores plummeted, coupled by a poor Ofsted inspection report in 1994. The appointment of Mary Waplington as headteacher in 1997 turned the school's fortunes around. It gained Language College specialist status in 2003 and was renamed The Sacred Heart Language College. In 2005 an Ofsted report deemed it to be very good. The appointment of Miss Geraldine Higgins as headteacher in 2007 ushered in a new phase with outstanding Ofsted judgements recorded in both 2008 and 2014. The 2013 Diocesan report on how well it fulfils its Catholic mission deemed it to be outstanding for both its teaching and spirituality.

The Sacred Heart Language College converted to academy status in May 2019 and is now sponsored by the Blessed Holy Family Catholic Academy Trust.
