= John Zubek =

Canadian psychologist

- Born: John Peter Zubek; March 20, 1925; Trnovec, Czechoslovakia
- Died: August 24, 1974 (aged 49); Winnipeg, Manitoba, Canada
- Education: University of British Columbia; University of Toronto; Johns Hopkins University
- Known for: Psychophysiology; Sensory deprivation Somesthesis
- Scientific career
- Fields: Psychology
- Workplaces: McGill University; University of Manitoba
- Thesis: The cortical basis of roughness discrimination in the rat (1950)
- Academic advisors: Clifford Morgan

John Peter Zubek (March 20, 1925 – August 24, 1974) was a Slovak-born Canadian psychologist known for his research on psychophysiology and sensory deprivation. In his obituary for the journal Canadian Psychology, Donald O. Hebb described him as "[o]ne of Canada's most distinguished psychologists".

== Biography ==
Zubek was born on March 20, 1925, in Trnovec, Czechoslovakia. When he was six, he and his family moved to Grand Forks, British Columbia, Canada. He graduated from the University of British Columbia in 1946, after which he earned his M.A. in social psychology from the University of Toronto. He then attended Johns Hopkins University in the United States, where he worked with Clifford Morgan to obtain his Ph.D. in physiological psychology in 1950. Also in 1950, he joined the faculty of McGill University in Canada as an assistant professor, continuing to hold this position until 1953, when he joined the University of Manitoba as Professor and Head of the Department of Psychology. He continued to serve as Head of the Department of Psychology at the University of Manitoba until 1961, when he became a research professor there. In 1967, he was elected a fellow of the Canadian Psychological Association, and in 1973, he received the Clifford J. Robson award from the University of Manitoba. He died in Winnipeg, Manitoba, Canada on August 24, 1974.

== Sensory deprivation research ==
In 1959 the Defence Research Board, which had funded Hebb's isolation work at McGill, approved the first of fifteen years of grants for an isolation laboratory at the University of Manitoba, eventually totalling $275,000. From 1964 the US National Institute of Mental Health also funded the work. The laboratory used a translucent Plexiglas dome in a partly soundproofed chamber. Zubek was its first subject, spending ten days inside. More than 500 volunteers took part, including graduate students and aircrew from RCAF Station Winnipeg. Subjects were paid about $100 for a minimum week in the chamber.

In 1972, the British Parker Report on the interrogation of internees in Northern Ireland cited "a considerable bibliography of experiments in this field, particularly in Canada". Zubek told reporters that his work was not about brainwashing, though he said such techniques "may have their place in certain situations such as times of war". In November 1972, more than 100 students met to discuss the university's connection to the techniques used in Northern Ireland. His funding ended in 1974. He disappeared on the evening of August 17, 1974, and his body was later found in the Red River. His death was ruled a suicide. The laboratory was not used again.
