= Clifford Morgan =

American psychologist (1915–1976)

- Born: Clifford Thomas Morgan; July 21, 1915; Minotola, New Jersey, U.S.
- Died: February 12, 1976 (aged 60); Austin, Texas, U.S.
- Education: Maryville College; University of Rochester
- Scientific career
- Fields: Experimental psychology Physiological psychology
- Institutions: Harvard University; Johns Hopkins University; University of Texas at Austin
- Thesis: The Dark-Adaptation Curve of Normal and A-Avitaminotic Rats (1939)
- Doctoral advisor: Elmer Culler
- Notable students: John Zubek

Clifford Thomas Morgan (July 21, 1915 – February 12, 1976) was an American psychologist whose research was in the fields of physiological and experimental psychology.

Morgan was born in the Minotola section of Buena Vista Township, New Jersey (which since became part of Buena, New Jersey).

He was the author of the 1943 textbook Physiological Psychology, as well as a co-founder of the Psychonomic Society in 1959, of which he served as the first chairman. He also established three academic journals from 1964 to 1966: Psychonomic Science, Psychonomic Monograph Supplements, and Perception & Psychophysics. He went on to give these journals to the Psychonomic Society in 1967. In his honor, the Society for Behavioral Neuroscience and Comparative Psychology, Division 6 of the American Psychological Association, awards the Clifford T. Morgan Distinguished Service to Div. 6 Award.
