= Minotola, New Jersey =

Populated place in Atlantic County, New Jersey, US

- Unincorporated community
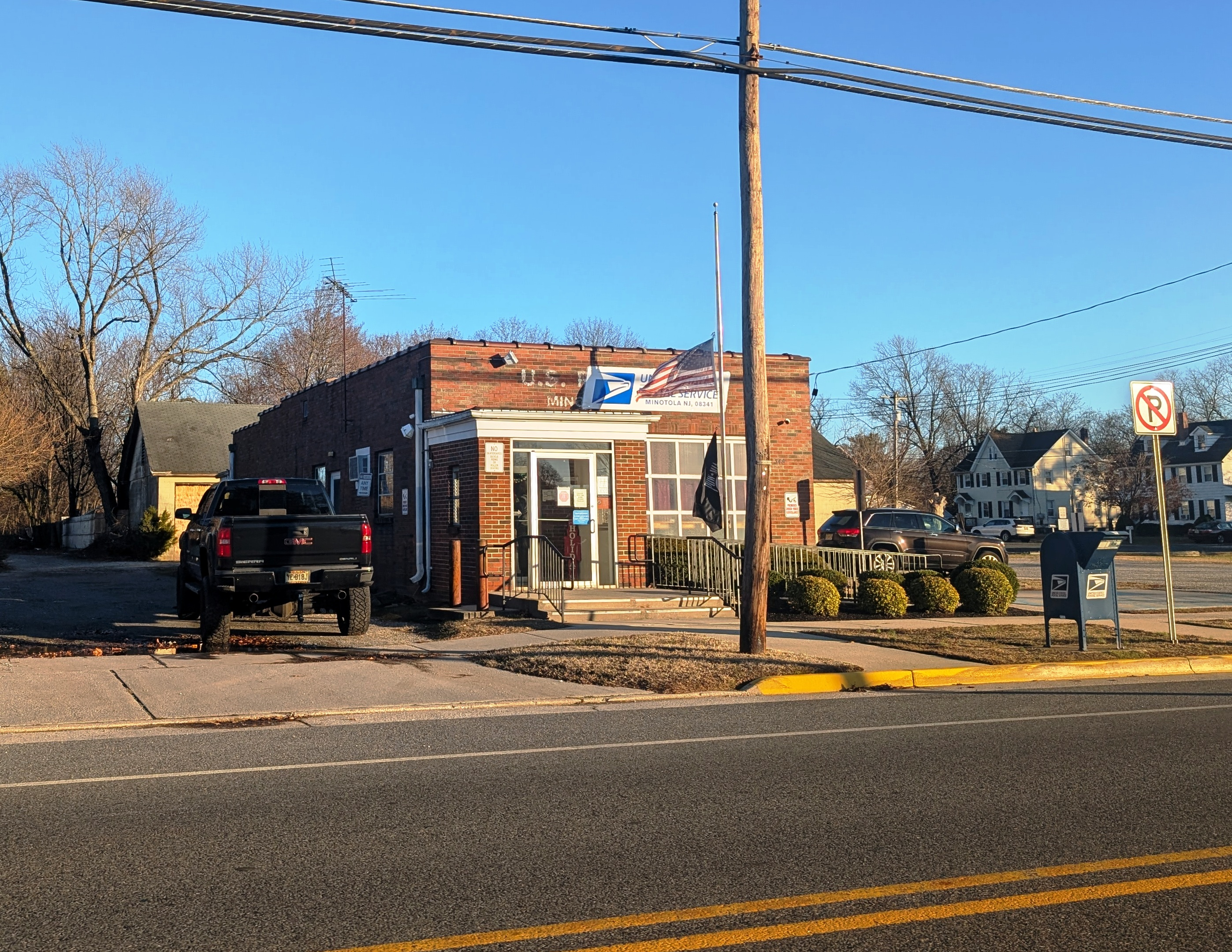
- Minotola post office

- Location in Atlantic County (Inset: Atlantic County in New Jersey) Minotola (New Jersey) Minotola (the United States)
- Coordinates: 39.5187°N 74.9482°W
- Country: United States
- State: New Jersey
- County: Atlantic
- Borough: Buena
- Founded: August 7, 1897
- Elevation: 125 ft (38 m)
- Time zone: UTC−05:00 (Eastern (EST))
  - Summer (DST): UTC−04:00 (Eastern (EDT))
- ZIP code: 08341
- Area code: 856
- GNIS feature ID: 0878411

Minotola is an unincorporated community located within Buena Borough, in Atlantic County, in the U.S. state of New Jersey.

The Minotola Post Office was founded by John H. Sims in 1897.

== Education ==
Minotola is part of the Buena Regional School District, which serves Buena Borough as well as the communities of Buena Vista Township, Weymouth Township, and Estell Manor. Schools located within Minotola include Dr. J.P. Cleary Elementary School, and Notre Dame Regional parochial school, both located on Central Avenue.

== Notable people ==
People who were born in, residents of, or otherwise closely associated with Minotola include:

- Clifford Morgan (1915–1976), psychologist whose research was in the fields of physiological and experimental psychology
