= Buena, New Jersey =

Borough in Atlantic County, New Jersey, US

- Borough
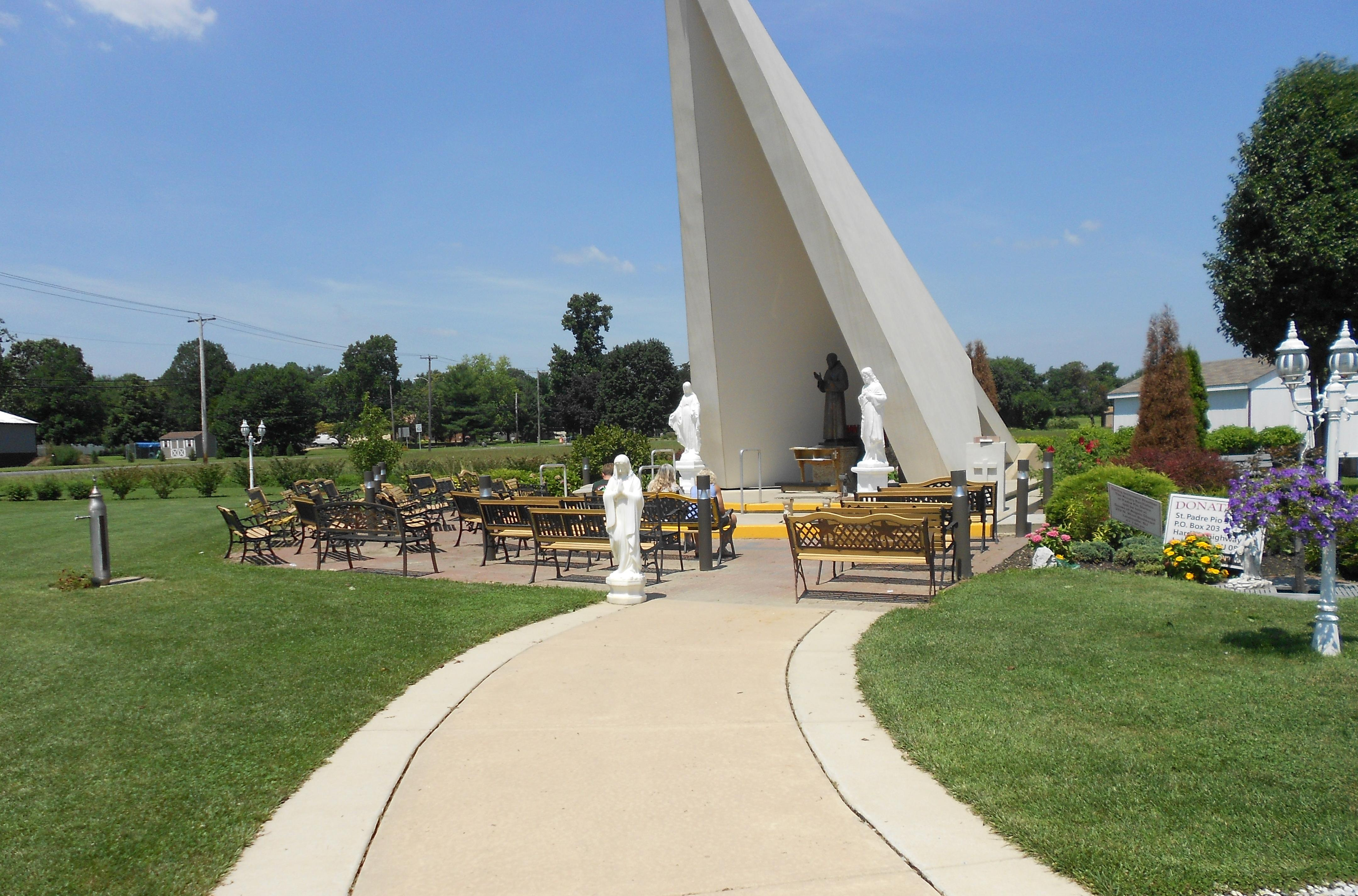
- St. Padre Pio Shrine

- Seal
- Motto: "A Small Town with a Big Heart"
- Location of Buena in Atlantic County highlighted in red (left). Inset map: Location of Atlantic County in New Jersey highlighted in orange (right).

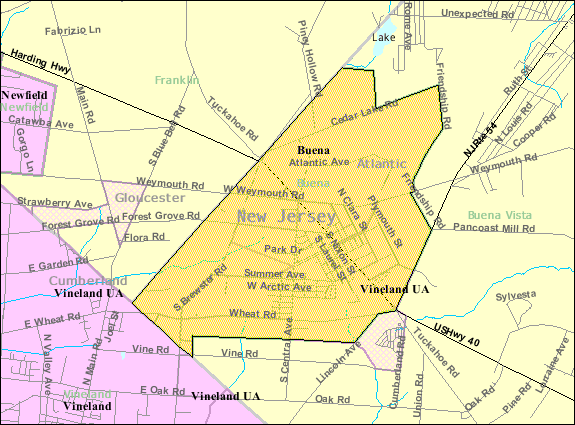
- Census Bureau map of Buena, New Jersey

- Location in Atlantic County Location in New Jersey Location in the United States
- Coordinates: 39.52917°N 74.945205°W
- Country: United States
- State: New Jersey
- County: Atlantic
- Incorporated: September 1, 1948
- Named for: Buena Vista Township/Battle of Buena Vista

Government
  - Type: Borough
  - Body: Borough Council
  - Mayor: Joseph Baruffi (R, term ends December 31, 2027)
  - Municipal clerk: Pamela Johnston (acting)

Area
  - Total: 7.58 sq mi (19.62 km^{2})
  - Land: 7.57 sq mi (19.61 km^{2})
  - Water: 0 sq mi (0.00 km^{2}) 0.01%
  - Rank: 235th of 565 in state 15th of 23 in county
- Elevation: 121 ft (37 m)

Population (2020)
  - Total: 4,501
  - Estimate (2023): 4,489
  - Rank: 395th of 565 in state 16th of 23 in county
  - Density: 594.4/sq mi (229.5/km^{2})
  - Rank: 432nd of 565 in state 12th of 23 in county
- Time zone: UTC−05:00 (Eastern (EST))
  - Summer (DST): UTC−04:00 (Eastern (EDT))
- ZIP Codes: 08310 – Buena; 08326 – Landisville; 08341 – Minotola
- Area codes: 609, 856
- FIPS code: 3400108680
- GNIS feature ID: 0885173
- Website: buenaboro.gov

Buena (/ˈbjuːnə/ BEW-nə) is a borough in Atlantic County, in the U.S. state of New Jersey. The borough, and all of Atlantic County, is part of South Jersey and the Atlantic City-Hammonton metropolitan statistical area, which in turn is included in the Philadelphia metropolitan area.

As of the 2020 United States census, the borough's population was 4,501, a decrease of 102 (−2.2%) from the 2010 census count of 4,603, which in turn reflected an increase of 730 (+18.8%) from the 3,873 counted in the 2000 census.

== History ==
Charles K. Landis was a land developer who was the driving force behind the creation of Hammonton and Vineland. Landis also had a hand in establishing other small communities, including Landisville, in Buena Borough. He planned to make it county seat of a new county called Landis County, which would incorporate land from the surrounding counties. However, the locals were against this, and began calling him "King Landis".

Buena was incorporated as a borough by an act of the New Jersey Legislature on September 1, 1948, from portions of Buena Vista Township. The borough was reincorporated on May 18, 1949. The borough derives its name from Buena Vista Township, which in turn was named for the 1847 Battle of Buena Vista during the Mexican–American War.

In 1979, local resident Madeline Barrale authored a 115-page book illustrating the borough's history. Buena Borough celebrated its 50th anniversary in 1999 with the 1st Annual "Buena Day" at Bruno Melini Park. In 2002, the St. Padre Pio Shrine was erected by Italian-American farmers in the Landisville section of Buena and has attracted what was described by The New York Times as a "steady stream of Catholics" who come to pray at the site.

== Geography ==
According to the United States Census Bureau, the borough had a total area of 7.57 square miles (19.62 km^{2}), including 7.57 square miles (19.61 km^{2}) of land and <0.01 square miles (<0.01 km^{2}) of water (0.01%).

Unincorporated communities, localities and place names located partially or completely within the borough include Landisville and Minotola, each of which had postal facilities established with those names in 1871 and 1897, respectively.

The borough borders the municipalities of Buena Vista Township in Atlantic County; Vineland in Cumberland County; and Franklin Township in Gloucester County.

The borough is one of 56 South Jersey municipalities that are included within the New Jersey Pinelands National Reserve, a protected natural area of unique ecology covering 1,100,000 acres (450,000 ha), that has been classified as a United States Biosphere Reserve and established by Congress in 1978 as the nation's first National Reserve. Part of the borough is included in the state-designated Pinelands Area, which includes portions of Atlantic County, along with areas in Burlington, Camden, Cape May, Cumberland, Gloucester and Ocean counties.

Unexpected Road was named the seventh wackiest street name according to a 2006 poll by Car Connection website.

== Demographics ==
Historical population
| Census | Pop. | Note | %± |
|---|---|---|---|
| 1950 | 2,640 | | — |
| 1960 | 3,243 | | 22.8% |
| 1970 | 3,283 | | 1.2% |
| 1980 | 3,642 | | 10.9% |
| 1990 | 4,441 | | 21.9% |
| 2000 | 3,873 | | −12.8% |
| 2010 | 4,603 | | 18.8% |
| 2020 | 4,501 | | −2.2% |
| 2023 (est.) | 4,489 | ▼ | −0.3% |
Population sources: 1950–2000 1950–1990; 2000 2010 2020

=== 2020 census ===
As of the 2020 census, Buena had a population of 4,501. The median age was 40.1 years. 22.0% of residents were under the age of 18 and 16.9% of residents were 65 years of age or older. For every 100 females there were 92.8 males, and for every 100 females age 18 and over there were 89.9 males age 18 and over.

82.9% of residents lived in urban areas, while 17.1% lived in rural areas.

There were 1,766 households in Buena, of which 31.0% had children under the age of 18 living in them. Of all households, 40.7% were married-couple households, 17.4% were households with a male householder and no spouse or partner present, and 31.6% were households with a female householder and no spouse or partner present. About 28.8% of all households were made up of individuals and 15.3% had someone living alone who was 65 years of age or older.

There were 1,923 housing units, of which 8.2% were vacant. The homeowner vacancy rate was 2.5% and the rental vacancy rate was 7.1%.

Racial composition as of the 2020 census
| Race | Number | Percent |
|---|---|---|
| White | 2,800 | 62.2% |
| Black or African American | 369 | 8.2% |
| American Indian and Alaska Native | 34 | 0.8% |
| Asian | 82 | 1.8% |
| Native Hawaiian and Other Pacific Islander | 4 | 0.1% |
| Some other race | 674 | 15.0% |
| Two or more races | 538 | 12.0% |
| Hispanic or Latino (of any race) | 1,449 | 32.2% |

=== 2010 census ===
The 2010 United States census counted 4,603 people, 1,723 households, and 1,160 families in the borough. The population density was 607.4 per square mile (234.5/km^{2}). There were 1,855 housing units at an average density of 244.8 per square mile (94.5/km^{2}). The racial makeup was 73.50% (3,383) White, 9.43% (434) Black or African American, 0.74% (34) Native American, 1.78% (82) Asian, 0.07% (3) Pacific Islander, 11.62% (535) from other races, and 2.87% (132) from two or more races. Hispanic or Latino of any race were 29.42% (1,354) of the population.

Of the 1,723 households, 30.7% had children under the age of 18; 43.6% were married couples living together; 17.0% had a female householder with no husband present and 32.7% were non-families. Of all households, 27.5% were made up of individuals and 15.7% had someone living alone who was 65 years of age or older. The average household size was 2.66 and the average family size was 3.23.

24.9% of the population were under the age of 18, 9.0% from 18 to 24, 26.3% from 25 to 44, 25.6% from 45 to 64, and 14.2% who were 65 years of age or older. The median age was 37.4 years. For every 100 females, the population had 92.4 males. For every 100 females ages 18 and older there were 88.3 males.

The Census Bureau's 2006–2010 American Community Survey showed that (in 2010 inflation-adjusted dollars) median household income was $53,060 (with a margin of error of +/− $14,830) and the median family income was $60,398 (+/− $6,199). Males had a median income of $47,439 (+/− $6,193) versus $35,700 (+/− $8,353) for females. The per capita income for the borough was $23,044 (+/− $2,700). About 8.2% of families and 11.3% of the population were below the poverty line, including 14.6% of those under age 18 and 9.9% of those age 65 or over.

=== 2000 census ===
As of the 2000 United States census there were 3,873 people, 1,454 households, and 978 families residing in the borough. The population density was 509.1 inhabitants per square mile (196.6/km^{2}). There were 1,553 housing units at an average density of 204.1 per square mile (78.8/km^{2}). The racial makeup of the borough was 77.28% White, 7.64% African American, 0.52% Native American, 0.44% Asian, 0.03% Pacific Islander, 10.53% from other races, and 3.56% from two or more races. Hispanic or Latino of any race were 23.65% of the population.

As of the 2000 Census, 33.5% of Buena residents were of Italian ancestry, the 22nd-highest percentage of any municipality in the United States and ninth-highest in New Jersey, among all places with more than 1,000 residents identifying their ancestry.

There were 1,454 households, out of which 32.3% had children under the age of 18 living with them, 48.0% were married couples living together, 13.1% had a female householder with no husband present, and 32.7% were non-families. 28.0% of all households were made up of individuals, and 16.0% had someone living alone who was 65 years of age or older. The average household size was 2.64 and the average family size was 3.23.

In the borough the population was spread out, with 25.7% under the age of 18, 8.6% from 18 to 24, 30.1% from 25 to 44, 19.7% from 45 to 64, and 15.8% who were 65 years of age or older. The median age was 36 years. For every 100 females, there were 95.0 males. For every 100 females age 18 and over, there were 91.1 males.

The median income for a household in the borough was $35,679, and the median income for a family was $44,352. Males had a median income of $37,985 versus $23,788 for females. The per capita income for the borough was $16,717. About 11.8% of families and 18.7% of the population were below the poverty line, including 28.1% of those under age 18 and 14.1% of those age 65 or over.

== Government ==
=== Local government ===
Buena Borough is governed under the borough form of New Jersey municipal government, which is used in 218 municipalities (of the 564) statewide, making it the most common form of government in New Jersey. The governing body is comprised of a mayor and a borough council, with all positions elected at-large on a partisan basis as part of the November general election. A mayor is elected directly by the voters to a four-year term of office. The borough council includes six members elected to serve three-year terms on a staggered basis, with two seats coming up for election each year in a three-year cycle. The borough form of government used by Buena is a "weak mayor / strong council" government in which council members act as the legislative body with the mayor presiding at meetings and voting only in the event of a tie. The mayor can veto ordinances subject to an override by a two-thirds majority vote of the council. The mayor makes committee and liaison assignments for council members, and most appointments are made by the mayor with the advice and consent of the council.

As of 2026, the mayor of Buena Borough is Republican Joseph Baruffi, whose term of office ends December 31, 2027. Members of the Buena Borough Council are Council President Douglas Adams (R, 2028), Jorge A. Alvarez (R, 2026), Patricia A. Andaloro (R, 2027), Marina Barsuglia (R, 2028), Frank DeStefano (R, 2026) and Richard Giovinazzi (R, 2027).

Gina Andaloro had switched parties from Democrat to Republican and in January 2023 resigned from her seat expiring in December 2024. The council appointed Republican Richard Giovinazzi to fill her seat, but the council undid the "inadvertent appointment" after realizing that the position should be filled from the same party that elected the individual who resigned. After the council refused to appoint any of the three Democrats nominated, the Democratic municipal committee in March 2023 named Ernest Merighi to fill the vacant seat.

In May 2021, Republican Councilmember Aldo S. Palmieri submitted his resignation from his seat expiring in December 2023, but the council did not accept the resignation until January 2022 at which time it was accepted retroactive to May. In November 222, Joseph Fabrizio was elected to serve the balance of the term.

In July 2019, Joseph D'Alessandro was appointed to fill the seat expiring in December 2019 that had been held by Jeffrey Marolda until his resignation from office the precious month.

In October 2016, Jorge Alvarez become Buena's first Hispanic councilmember when he was chosen from three candidates nominated by the Republican municipal committee to fill the seat expiring in December 2017 that had been held by Robert L. James Jr. until his resignation.

In February 2016, the borough council selected Matthew Walker Sr. from a list of three candidates nominated by the Republican municipal committee to fill the seat expiring in December 2016 that had been held by Edward Cugini until his resignation; Walker became the first African-American to serve on the borough council.

In 2018, the Buena Borough Police Department was disbanded. The borough entered into a shared service agreement with the Franklin Township Police Department, whose Chief of Police is Brian Zimmer. With the dissolution of Buena's police force, the borough's officers were being given an opportunity for consideration to be hired by Franklin Township.

=== Federal, state and county representation ===
Buena is located in the 2nd Congressional District and is part of New Jersey's 4th state legislative district.

For the 119th United States Congress, New Jersey's 2nd congressional district is represented by Jeff Van Drew (R, Dennis Township). New Jersey is represented in the United States Senate by Democrats Cory Booker (Newark, term ends 2027) and Andy Kim (Moorestown, term ends 2031).

For the 2026–2027 session, the 4th legislative district of the New Jersey Legislature is represented in the State Senate by Paul D. Moriarty (D, Washington Township) and in the General Assembly by Dan Hutchison (D, Gloucester Township) and Cody Miller (D, Monroe Township).

Atlantic County is governed by a directly elected county executive and a nine-member Board of County Commissioners, responsible for legislation. The executive serves a four-year term and the commissioners are elected to staggered three-year terms, of which four are elected from the county on an at-large basis and five of the commissioners represent equally populated districts. As of 2025, Atlantic County's Executive is Dennis Levinson (R, Northfield), whose term of office ends December 31, 2027. Members of the Board of County Commissioners are:

Ernest D. Coursey (D, District 1-- Atlantic City, Egg Harbor Township (part), Longport, Margate City, and Ventnor City; 2025, Atlantic City), Chair Maureen Kern (R, District 2-- Egg Harbor Township (part), Linwood, Northfield, Somers Point and Pleasantville; 2027, Somers Point), Andrew Parker III (R, District 3-- Egg Harbor Township (part) and Hamilton Township (part); 2026, Egg Harbor Township), Richard R. Dase (R, District 4, including Brigantine, Galloway Township, Egg Harbor Township (part), and Port Republic; 2025, Galloway Township), Vice Chair James A. Bertino (R, District 5-- Buena, Buena Vista Township, Corbin City, Egg Harbor City, Estell Manor, Folsom, Hamilton Township (part), Hammonton, Mullica Township and Weymouth Township; 2027, Hammonton), June Byrnes (R, At-Large; 2026, Linwood), Michael Ruffu (R, At-Large; Margate, 2027) Amy L. Gatto (R, At-large; 2025, Hamilton Township) and John W. Risley (R, At-Large; 2026, Egg Harbor Township)

Atlantic County's constitutional officers are: Clerk Joesph J. Giralo (R, 2026, Hammonton), Sheriff Joe O'Donoghue (R, 2026, Egg Harbor Township) and Surrogate James Curcio (R, 2025, Hammonton).

=== Politics ===
As of March 23, 2011, there were a total of 2,771 registered voters in Buena, of which 593 (21.4% vs. 30.5% countywide) were registered as Democrats, 764 (27.6% vs. 25.2%) were registered as Republicans and 1,414 (51.0% vs. 44.3%) were registered as Unaffiliated. There were no voters registered to other parties. Among the borough's 2010 Census population, 60.2% (vs. 58.8% in Atlantic County) were registered to vote, including 80.2% of those ages 18 and over (vs. 76.6% countywide).

Gubernatorial election results for Buena
| Year | Republican | | Democratic | | Third party(ies) | |
| Year | No. | % | No. | % | No. | % |
|---|---|---|---|---|---|---|
| 2025 | 860 | 55.63% | 676 | 43.73% | 10 | 0.65% |
| 2021 | 807 | 61.93% | 486 | 37.30% | 10 | 0.77% |
| 2017 | 429 | 49.42% | 425 | 48.96% | 14 | 1.61% |
| 2013 | 707 | 67.79% | 326 | 31.26% | 10 | 0.96% |
| 2009 | 692 | 52.27% | 547 | 41.31% | 85 | 6.42% |
| 2005 | 461 | 46.10% | 509 | 50.90% | 30 | 3.00% |

In the 2012 presidential election, Democrat Barack Obama received 1,011 votes (53.2% vs. 57.9% countywide), ahead of Republican Mitt Romney with 847 votes (44.6% vs. 41.1%) and other candidates with 18 votes (0.9% vs. 0.9%), among the 1,899 ballots cast by the borough's 2,919 registered voters, for a turnout of 65.1% (vs. 65.8% in Atlantic County). In the 2008 presidential election, Democrat Barack Obama received 1,048 votes (53.0% vs. 56.5% countywide), ahead of Republican John McCain with 877 votes (44.3% vs. 41.6%) and other candidates with 31 votes (1.6% vs. 1.1%), among the 1,979 ballots cast by the borough's 2,932 registered voters, for a turnout of 67.5% (vs. 68.1% in Atlantic County). In the 2004 presidential election, Democrat John Kerry received 927 votes (49.7% vs. 52.0% countywide), ahead of Republican George W. Bush with 894 votes (47.9% vs. 46.2%) and other candidates with 14 votes (0.7% vs. 0.8%), among the 1,867 ballots cast by the borough's 2,749 registered voters, for a turnout of 67.9% (vs. 69.8% in the whole county).

Presidential elections results
| Year | Republican | Democratic | Third Parties |
|---|---|---|---|
| 2024 | 59.7% 1,256 | 38.8% 816 | 1.5% 31 |
| 2020 | 53.4% 1,140 | 45.1% 964 | 1.5% 33 |
| 2016 | 53.1% 894 | 42.3% 712 | 4.7% 79 |
| 2012 | 44.6% 847 | 53.2% 1,011 | 0.9% 18 |
| 2008 | 44.3% 877 | 53.0% 1,048 | 1.6% 31 |
| 2004 | 47.9% 894 | 49.7% 927 | 0.7% 14 |

In the 2013 gubernatorial election, Republican Chris Christie received 707 votes (66.0% vs. 60.0% countywide), ahead of Democrat Barbara Buono with 326 votes (30.4% vs. 34.9%) and other candidates with 10 votes (0.9% vs. 1.3%), among the 1,072 ballots cast by the borough's 2,977 registered voters, yielding a 36.0% turnout (vs. 41.5% in the county). In the 2009 gubernatorial election, Republican Chris Christie received 692 votes (50.4% vs. 47.7% countywide), ahead of Democrat Jon Corzine with 547 votes (39.8% vs. 44.5%), Independent Chris Daggett with 56 votes (4.1% vs. 4.8%) and other candidates with 29 votes (2.1% vs. 1.2%), among the 1,373 ballots cast by the borough's 2,819 registered voters, yielding a 48.7% turnout (vs. 44.9% in the county).

United States Senate election results for Buena1
| Year | Republican | | Democratic | | Third party(ies) | |
| Year | No. | % | No. | % | No. | % |
|---|---|---|---|---|---|---|
| 2024 | 1,154 | 58.31% | 786 | 39.72% | 39 | 1.97% |
| 2018 | 626 | 51.78% | 524 | 43.34% | 59 | 4.88% |
| 2012 | 730 | 42.27% | 970 | 56.17% | 27 | 1.56% |
| 2006 | 548 | 50.79% | 508 | 47.08% | 23 | 2.13% |

United States Senate election results for Buena2
| Year | Republican | | Democratic | | Third party(ies) | |
| Year | No. | % | No. | % | No. | % |
|---|---|---|---|---|---|---|
| 2020 | 1,057 | 51.41% | 950 | 46.21% | 49 | 2.38% |
| 2014 | 499 | 56.00% | 379 | 42.54% | 13 | 1.46% |
| 2013 | 274 | 55.69% | 213 | 43.29% | 5 | 1.02% |
| 2008 | 778 | 43.88% | 962 | 54.26% | 33 | 1.86% |

== Education ==
Students in public school for pre-kindergarten through twelfth grade from Buena Borough attend the Buena Regional School District, together with students from Buena Vista Township. Students are sent to the district's high school, Buena Regional High School, for grades 9–12 from both Estell Manor City and Weymouth Township as part of sending/receiving relationships with the respective school districts.

As of the 2020–21 school year, the district, comprised of five schools, had an enrollment of 1,691 students and 150.0 classroom teachers (on an FTE basis), for a student–teacher ratio of 11.3:1. Schools in the district (with 2020–21 enrollment data from the National Center for Education Statistics) are Collings Lakes Elementary School with 197 students in grades K-2, John C. Milanesi Elementary School with 259 students in grades PreK-2, Dr. J.P. Cleary Elementary School with 309 students in grades 3–5, Buena Regional Middle School with 336 students in grades 6-8 and Buena Regional High School with 535 students in grades 9–12.

Borough public school students are also eligible to attend the Atlantic County Institute of Technology in the Mays Landing section of Hamilton Township or the Charter-Tech High School for the Performing Arts, located in Somers Point.

Edgarton Christian Academy is a non-denominational Christian K–8 school established in 2012. As of 2020 it leases a 29,000-square-foot (2,700 m^{2}) space in Newfield in Gloucester County, though it has plans to move to Buena. When the 76-student The Ellison School in Vineland closed in December 2019, 25 of them moved to Edgarton. The school is building a 50,000-square-foot (4,600 m^{2}) permanent building on a 15-acre (6.1 ha) property in Buena.

Notre Dame Regional School of the Roman Catholic Diocese of Camden had one of its two campuses in Landisville, with the other in Newfield. The school closed in 2012. It had 270 students at the time of closure. That year remnants of the school formed the non-Catholic Edgarton Christian Academy. 263 of the former Notre Dame students moved to Edgarton.

== Transportation ==
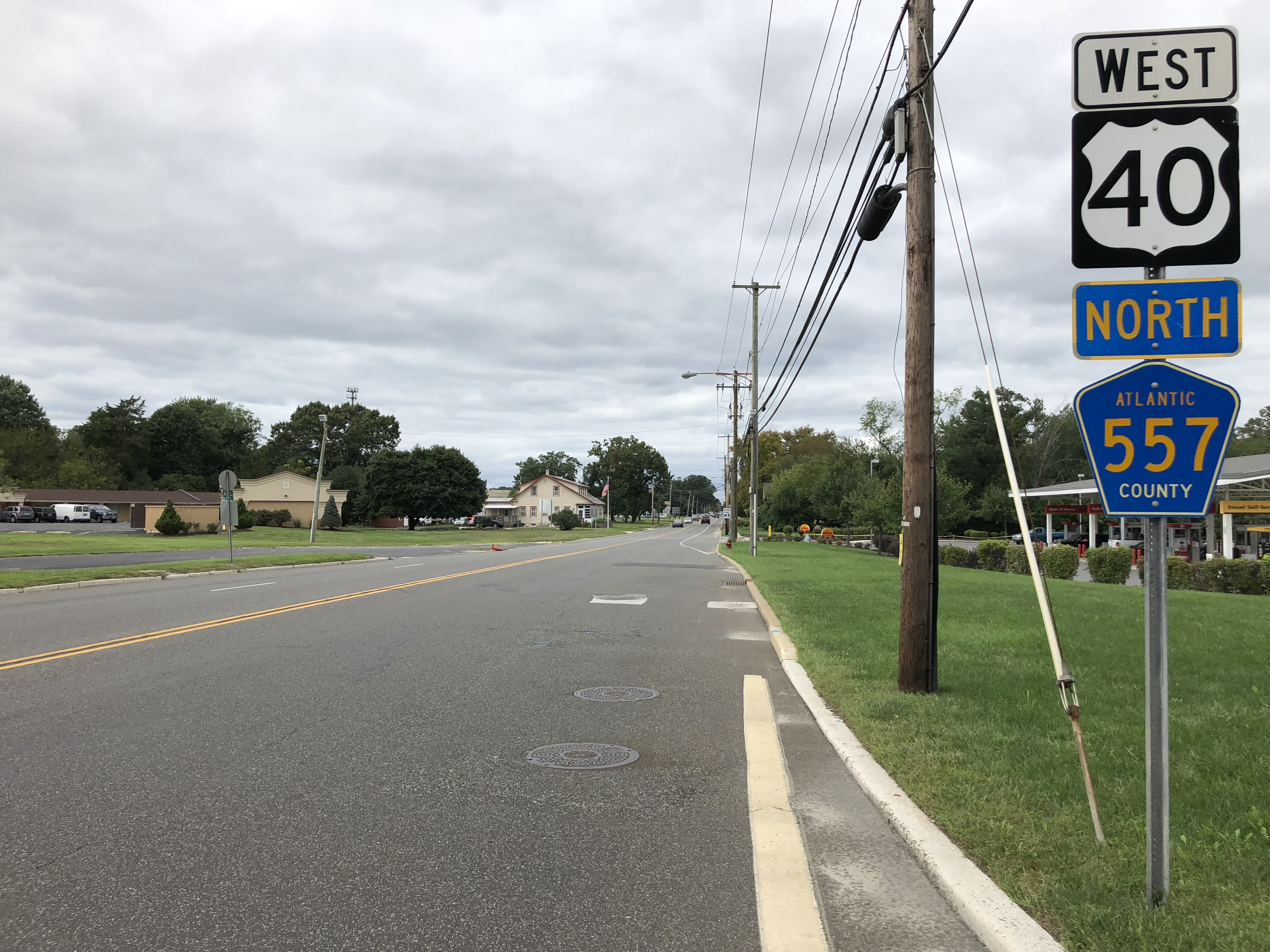
U.S. Route 40 and County Route 557 in Buena

As of May 2010, the borough had a total of 39.28 miles (63.22 km) of roadways, of which 24.69 miles (39.73 km) were maintained by the municipality, 11.62 miles (18.70 km) by Atlantic County and 2.97 miles (4.78 km) by the New Jersey Department of Transportation.

U.S. Route 40 passes through the heart of the borough, running concurrently with County Route 557. Route 54 passes through along the eastern border.

The closest limited access road is Route 55 in Vineland and Franklin. The Atlantic City Expressway can be reached by Route 54.

== Notable people ==
People who were born in, residents of, or otherwise closely associated with Buena include:

- Sharif Mobley (born 1984), suspected member of al-Qaeda
- Clifford Morgan (1915–1976), psychologist whose research was in the fields of physiological and experimental psychology

== Attractions ==
- Bellview Winery
- St. Padre Pio Shrine
