= Bellview Winery =

American winery located in New Jersey

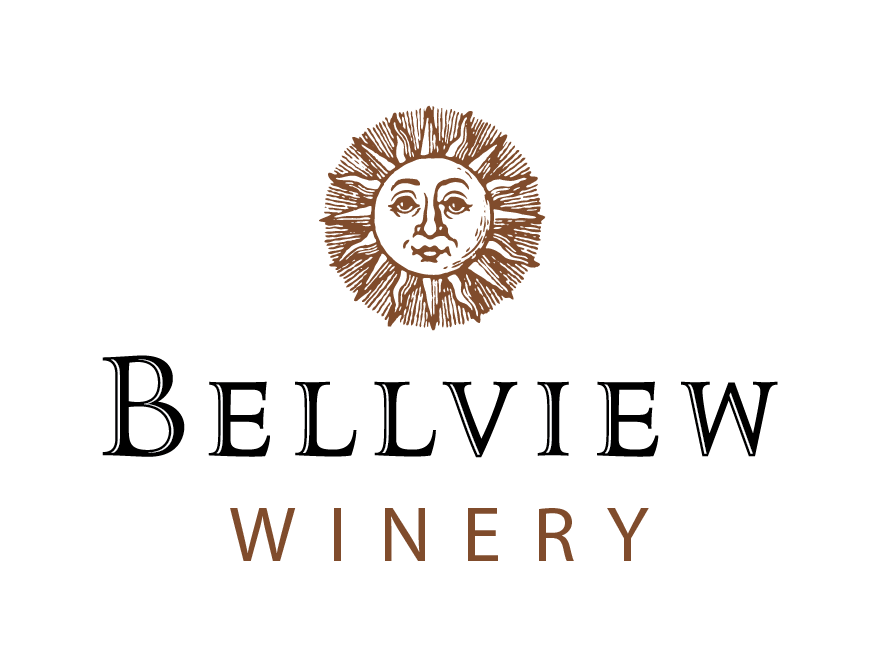
- Location: 150 Atlantic Street, Landisville, New Jersey, USA
- Coordinates: 39.54121°N 74.93696°W
- Wine region: Vintage Atlantic
- Appellation: Outer Coastal Plain AVA
- First vines planted: 2000
- Opened to the public: 2001
- Key people: Jim Quarella, Larry Coia, David Gardner
- Acres cultivated: 50 Cultivated, 150 Acres Owned
- Cases/yr: 9,000 (2024)
- Other attractions: Picnicking Permitted, Pet-Friendly, Wine Seminars, Public Events and Festivals, Private Events, Weddings
- Distribution: On-Site Tasting Room, Wine Festivals, NJ Farmers' Markets, Liquor Stores, In/Out of State Shipping
- Tasting: Daily Tastings Available, 10am to 5pm, 7 Days a Week (Except Major Holidays)
- Website: bellviewwinery.com

Bellview Winery is a winery in the Landisville section of Buena in Atlantic County, New Jersey. A family produce farm since 1914, the vineyard was first planted in 2000, and opened to the public in 2001. Bellview has 50 acres of grapes under cultivation, and produces 9,000 cases of wine per year. The farm was named by Angelo and Maria Quarella and is of Italian origin.

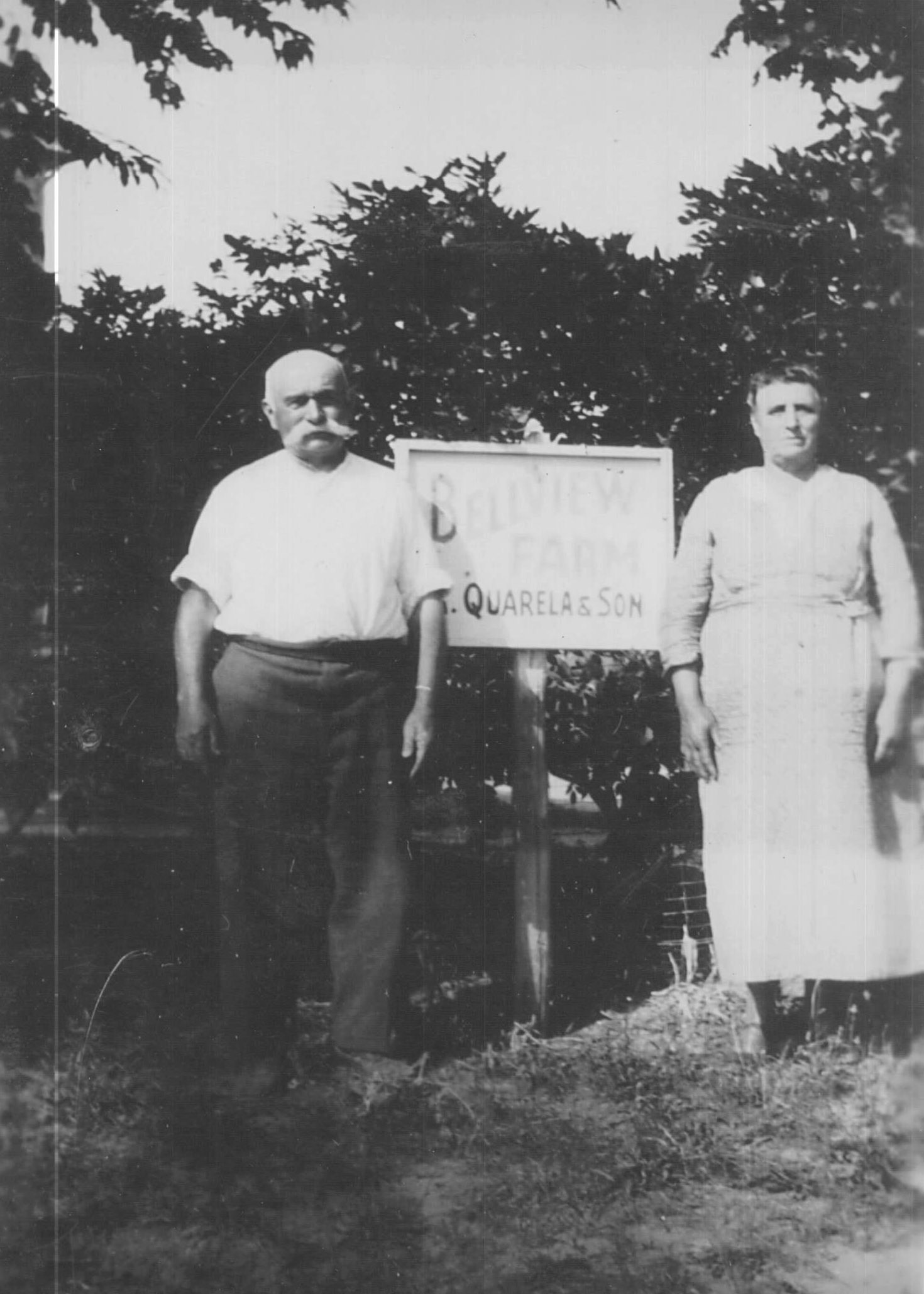
Angelo Quarella, founder of Bellview Farms, with wife

== Wines ==
Bellview Winery is in the Outer Coastal Plain AVA, and produces wine from Blaufränkisch (Lemberger), Cabernet Franc, San Marco, Cabernet Sauvignon, Cayuga White, Chambourcin, Chardonnay, Fredonia, Ives noir, Merlot, Regent, Niagara, Petit Verdot, Pinot grigio, Trentina, Tannat, Saperavi, Gruner Veltliner, Traminette, Vidal Blanc, and Viognier grapes. Bellview also makes fruit wines from blueberries, cranberries, and dandelions. It is one of only a handful of wineries in the United States that produces wine from dandelions (Taraxacum officinale). The winery was a participant at the Judgment of Princeton, a wine tasting organized by the American Association of Wine Economists that compared New Jersey wines to premium French vintages.

== Associations/Licensing ==
Bellview Winery is a member of the Garden State Wine Growers Association, the Outer Coastal Plain Vineyard Association, as well as two wine trails in their local region, including the Two Bridges Wine Trail and Wine and Ale Trail of South Jersey. As a founding member of the Outer Coastal Plain Vineyard Association, Bellview Winery helped to form the creation of the Outer Coastal Plain AVA region, opening up opportunity for wineries in New Jersey to grow as their own unique destination.

Bellview operates under a Plenary Winery License from the New Jersey Division of Alcoholic Beverage Control, allowing it to produce an unrestricted amount of wine, as well as operate up to 15 off-premises sales rooms. As a result of further legislation in 2012, Bellview Winery also has the option to mail wine directly to some consumers, under new Direct Shipping laws in the state. Combined with Direct Shipping laws, Bellview's license allows the shipment of up to 12 cases per year to consumers In or Out-Of-State.

== See also ==
- Alcohol laws of New Jersey
- American wine
- Judgment of Princeton
- List of wineries, breweries, and distilleries in New Jersey
- New Jersey Farm Winery Act
- New Jersey Wine Industry Advisory Council
- New Jersey wine
