= Newfield, New Jersey =

Borough in Gloucester County, New Jersey, US

- Borough
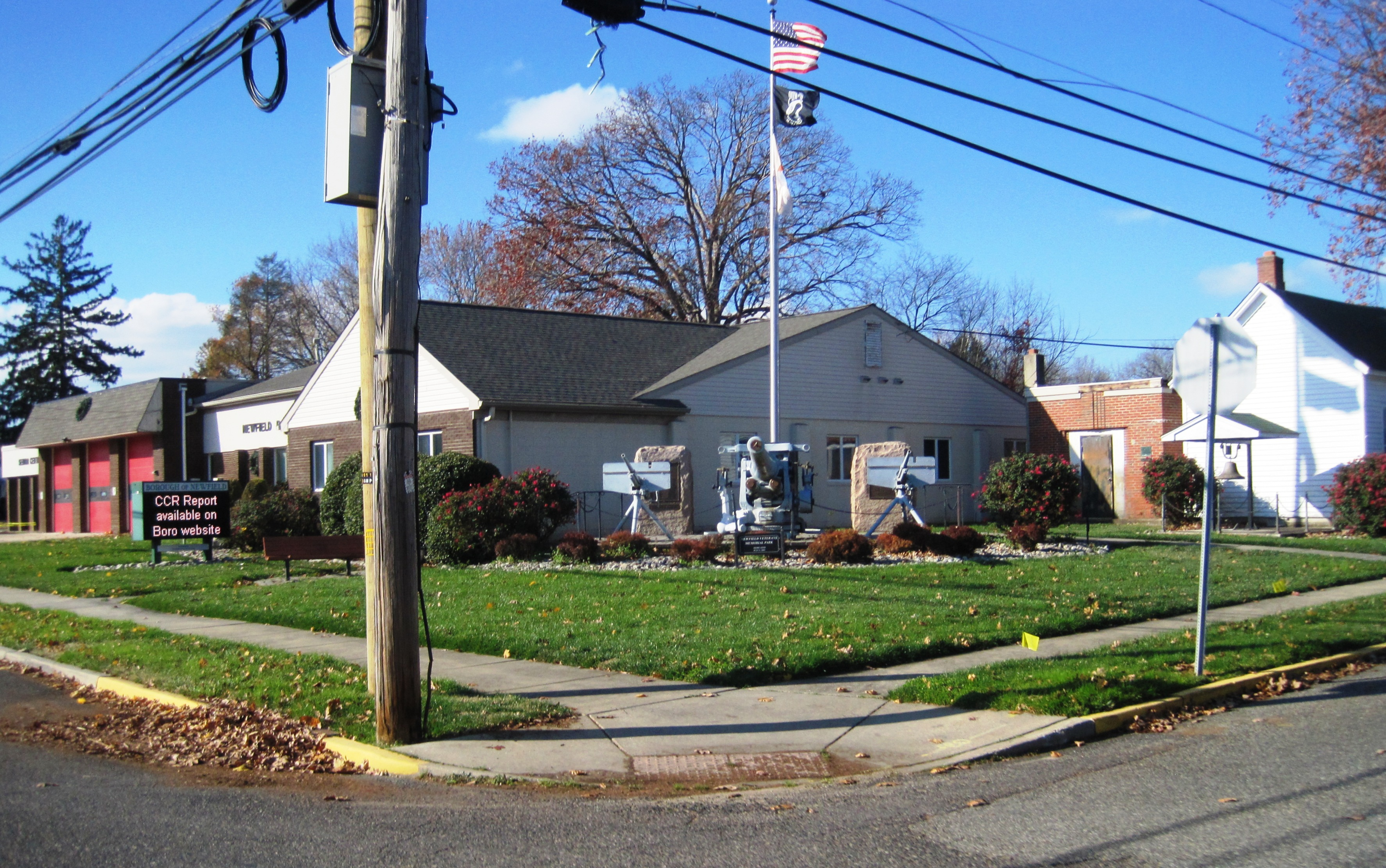
- Newfield municipal building

- Map of Newfield highlighted within Gloucester County. Inset: Location of Gloucester County in New Jersey.

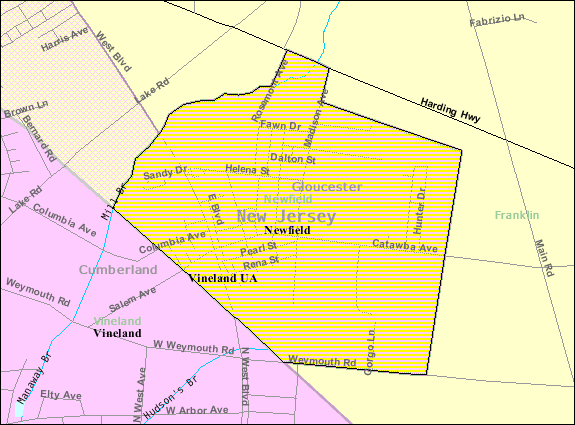
- Census Bureau map of Newfield, New Jersey

- Location in Gloucester County Location in New Jersey Location in the United States
- Coordinates: 39.551041°N 75.010217°W
- Country: United States
- State: New Jersey
- County: Gloucester
- Incorporated: March 8, 1924

Government
  - Type: Borough
  - Body: Borough Council
  - Mayor: Charles D. Grova Jr. (R, term ends December 31, 2026)
  - Administrator / Municipal clerk: Toni Van Camp

Area
  - Total: 1.74 sq mi (4.51 km^{2})
  - Land: 1.74 sq mi (4.50 km^{2})
  - Water: 0.0039 sq mi (0.01 km^{2}) 0.17%
  - Rank: 427th of 565 in state 19th of 24 in county
- Elevation: 118 ft (36 m)

Population (2020)
  - Total: 1,774
  - Estimate (2023): 1,798
  - Rank: 496th of 565 in state 24th of 24 in county
  - Density: 1,020.6/sq mi (394.1/km^{2})
  - Rank: 383rd of 565 in state 14th of 24 in county
- Time zone: UTC−05:00 (Eastern (EST))
  - Summer (DST): UTC−04:00 (Eastern (EDT))
- ZIP Code: 08344
- Area code: 856
- FIPS code: 3401551390
- GNIS feature ID: 0885319
- Website: www.newfieldborough.org

Newfield is a borough in Gloucester County, in the U.S. state of New Jersey. As of the 2020 United States census, the borough's population was 1,774, an increase of 221 (+14.2%) from the 2010 census count of 1,553, which in turn reflected a decline of 63 (−3.9%) from the 1,616 counted in the 2000 census.

Newfield was formed as a borough by the New Jersey Legislature on March 8, 1924, from portions of Franklin Township, based on the results of a referendum held on April 1, 1924. In the weeks before the legislature approved the formation of the borough, a group of 240 residents traveled to Trenton by train to lobby on behalf of the creation of an independent municipality. The borough's name derives from its status as a new-field development.

== Geography ==
According to the U.S. Census Bureau, Newfield had a total area of 1.74 square miles (4.51 km^{2}), including 1.74 square miles (4.50 km^{2}) of land and <0.01 square miles (0.01 km^{2}) of water (0.17%). The borough borders the municipalities of Franklin Township in Gloucester County and Vineland in Cumberland County.

== Demographics ==
Historical population
Census	Pop.	Note	%±
1930	880		—
1940	889		1.0%
1950	1,010		13.6%
1960	1,299		28.6%
1970	1,487		14.5%
1980	1,563		5.1%
1990	1,592		1.9%
2000	1,616		1.5%
2010	1,553		−3.9%
2020	1,774		14.2%
2023 (est.)	1,798	▲	1.4%
Population sources: 1930–2000 1930 1940–2000; 2000 2010 2020

=== 2010 census ===
The 2010 United States census counted 1,553 people, 579 households, and 453 families in the borough. The population density was 912.0 inhabitants per square mile (352.1/km^{2}). There were 626 housing units at an average density of 367.6 per square mile (141.9/km^{2}). The racial makeup was 94.66% (1,470) White, 2.19% (34) Black or African American, 0.26% (4) Native American, 0.32% (5) Asian, 0.00% (0) Pacific Islander, 0.97% (15) from other races, and 1.61% (25) from two or more races. Hispanic or Latino of any race were 6.57% (102) of the population.

Of the 579 households, 31.1% had children under the age of 18; 59.2% were married couples living together; 12.4% had a female householder with no husband present and 21.8% were non-families. Of all households, 18.3% were made up of individuals and 7.6% had someone living alone who was 65 years of age or older. The average household size was 2.68 and the average family size was 3.03.

23.4% of the population were under the age of 18, 7.0% from 18 to 24, 24.5% from 25 to 44, 31.0% from 45 to 64, and 14.1% who were 65 years of age or older. The median age was 41.5 years. For every 100 females, the population had 93.2 males. For every 100 females ages 18 and older there were 91.9 males.

The Census Bureau's 2006–2010 American Community Survey showed that (in 2010 inflation-adjusted dollars) median household income was $60,350 (with a margin of error of +/− $5,077) and the median family income was $67,045 (+/− $11,678). Males had a median income of $45,000 (+/− $6,268) versus $47,000 (+/− $8,386) for females. The per capita income for the borough was $25,924 (+/− $1,886). About 7.8% of families and 8.2% of the population were below the poverty line, including 9.8% of those under age 18 and 6.9% of those age 65 or over.

=== 2000 census ===
As of the 2000 United States census, there were 1,616 people, 596 households, and 470 families residing in the borough. The population density was 951.1 inhabitants per square mile (367.2/km^{2}). There were 620 housing units at an average density of 364.7 per square mile (140.8/km^{2}). The racial makeup of the borough was 95.11% White, 1.30% African American, 0.68% Native American, 0.56% Asian, 1.05% from other races, and 1.30% from two or more races. Hispanic or Latino of any race were 3.84% of the population.

There were 596 households, out of which 33.6% had children under the age of 18 living with them, 64.9% were married couples living together, 9.9% had a female householder with no husband present, and 21.0% were non-families. 17.6% of all households were made up of individuals, and 9.1% had someone living alone who was 65 years of age or older. The average household size was 2.71 and the average family size was 3.04.

In the borough, the population was spread out, with 24.4% under the age of 18, 7.2% from 18 to 24, 28.9% from 25 to 44, 25.3% from 45 to 64, and 14.2% who were 65 years of age or older. The median age was 39 years. For every 100 females, there were 85.3 males. For every 100 females age 18 and over, there were 83.8 males.

The median income for a household in the borough was $51,875, and the median income for a family was $59,934. Males had a median income of $39,926 versus $28,750 for females. The per capita income for the borough was $21,063. About 5.5% of families and 6.5% of the population were below the poverty line, including 9.8% of those under age 18 and 6.1% of those age 65 or over.

== Economy ==
Sweet Amalia Market and Kitchen is a restaurant that was included by The New York Times on its 2024 list of the 50 best restaurants in the United States.

== Government ==
=== Local government ===
Newfield is governed under the borough form of New Jersey municipal government, which is used in 218 municipalities (of the 564) statewide, making it the most common form of government in New Jersey. The governing body is comprised of a mayor and a borough council, with all positions elected at-large on a partisan basis as part of the November general election. A mayor is elected directly by the voters to a four-year term of office. The borough council includes six members elected to serve three-year terms on a staggered basis, with two seats coming up for election each year in a three-year cycle. The borough form of government used by Newfield is a "weak mayor / strong council" government in which council members act as the legislative body with the mayor presiding at meetings and voting only in the event of a tie. The mayor can veto ordinances subject to an override by a two-thirds majority vote of the council. The mayor makes committee and liaison assignments for council members, and most appointments are made by the mayor with the advice and consent of the council.

As of 2025, the mayor of Newfield Borough is Republican Charles Grova Jr., whose term of office ends December 31, 2026. Members of the Newfield Borough Council are Council President Michael Carrow (R, 2026), Thomas D. Corwonski (D, 2025), Joseph Curcoio III (D, 2026), Jennifer Marandino (2025), Scott C. Miller (D, 2027) and Christina Renzi (R, 2027).

Resident committees were formed in September 2013, which announced that they would mount a petition drive to recall council members Michael Carrow and Everett Marshall III, in the wake of a conflict between the borough council and the volunteer fire department, in which the council passed an ordinance giving the borough control over the fire department and in response the fire company threatened to close in October if the ordinance wasn't overturned.

In January 2015, the borough council selected Stephen Boyle from a list of three candidates nominated by the Republican municipal committee to fill the vacant council seat expiring in December 2016 that had been held by Donald Sullivan until he took office as mayor. In the November 2015 general election, Boyle was elected to serve the balance of the term of office.

In August 2019, Christina Pierce was appointed by the borough council to fill the seat expiring in December 2021 that had been held by Patricia M. Purdy. In the November 2019 general election, Pierce was elected to serve the balance of the term of office.

=== Federal, state, and county representation ===
Newfield is located in the 2nd Congressional District and is part of New Jersey's 3rd state legislative district.

For the 119th United States Congress, New Jersey's 2nd congressional district is represented by Jeff Van Drew (R, Dennis Township). New Jersey is represented in the United States Senate by Democrats Cory Booker (Newark, term ends 2027) and Andy Kim (Moorestown, term ends 2031).

For the 2026–2027 session, the 3rd legislative district of the New Jersey Legislature is represented in the State Senate by John Burzichelli (D, Paulsboro) and in the General Assembly by David Bailey (D, Woodstown) and Heather Simmons (D, Glassboro).

Gloucester County is governed by a board of county commissioners, whose seven members are elected at-large to three-year terms of office on a staggered basis in partisan elections, with either two or three seats coming up for election each year. At a reorganization meeting held each January, the Board selects a Director and a Deputy Director from among its members. As of 2025, Gloucester County's Commissioners are:

Director Frank J. DiMarco (D, Deptford Township, 2025), Matt Weng (D, Pitman, 2026), Joann Gattinelli (D, Washington Township, 2026), Nicholas DeSilvio (R, Franklin Township, 2027), Denice DiCarlo (D, West Deptford Township, 2025) Deputy Director Jim Jefferson (D, Woodbury, 2026) and Christopher Konawel Jr. (R, Glassboro, 2027).

Gloucester County's constitutional officers are: Clerk James N. Hogan (D, Franklin Township; 2027), Sheriff Carmel Morina (D, Greenwich Township; 2027) and Surrogate Giuseppe "Joe" Chila (D, Woolwich Township; 2028).

=== Politics ===
United States presidential election results for Newfield 2024 2020 2016 2012 2008 2004
Year	Republican		Democratic		Third party(ies)	
Year	No.	%	No.	%	No.	%
2024	559	59.03%	367	38.75%	21	2.22%
2020	563	54.98%	445	43.46%	16	1.56%
2016	451	57.09%	306	38.73%	33	4.18%
2012	405	50.50%	388	48.38%	9	1.12%
2008	434	49.49%	426	48.57%	17	1.94%
2004	442	50.92%	418	48.16%	8	0.92%

As of March 2011, there were a total of 1,139 registered voters in Newfield, of which 514 (45.1%) were registered as Democrats, 245 (21.5%) were registered as Republicans and 380 (33.4%) were registered as Unaffiliated. There were no voters registered to other parties.

In the 2012 presidential election, Republican Mitt Romney received 49.9% of the vote (405 votes), ahead of Democrat Barack Obama with 47.8% (388 votes), and other candidates with 2.2% (18 votes), among the 811 ballots cast by the borough's 1,154 registered voters (9 ballots were spoiled), for a turnout of 70.3%. In the 2008 presidential election, Republican John McCain received 48.9% of the vote (434 cast), ahead of Democrat Barack Obama with 48.0% (426 votes) and other candidates with 1.9% (17 votes), among the 887 ballots cast by the borough's 1,185 registered voters, for a turnout of 74.9%. In the 2004 presidential election, Republican George W. Bush received 50.5% of the vote (442 ballots cast), outpolling Democrat John Kerry with 47.8% (418 votes) and other candidates with 0.7% (8 votes), among the 875 ballots cast by the borough's 1,214 registered voters, for a turnout percentage of 72.1.

Gubernatorial election results for Newfield
Year	Republican		Democratic		Third party(ies)	
Year	No.	%	No.	%	No.	%
2025	420	57.14%	309	42.04%	6	0.82%
2021	376	61.84%	228	37.50%	4	0.66%
2017	220	48.46%	223	49.12%	11	2.42%
2013	362	66.79%	175	32.29%	5	0.92%
2009	283	46.02%	260	42.28%	72	11.71%
2005	309	45.85%	351	52.08%	14	2.08%

In the 2013 gubernatorial election, Republican Chris Christie received 66.8% of the vote (362 cast), ahead of Democrat Barbara Buono with 32.3% (175 votes), and other candidates with 0.9% (5 votes), among the 562 ballots cast by the borough's 1,141 registered voters (20 ballots were spoiled), for a turnout of 49.3%. In the 2009 gubernatorial election, Republican Chris Christie received 44.4% of the vote (283 ballots cast), ahead of Democrat Jon Corzine with 40.8% (260 votes), Independent Chris Daggett with 10.2% (65 votes) and other candidates with 1.1% (7 votes), among the 637 ballots cast by the borough's 1,176 registered voters, yielding a 54.2% turnout.

United States Senate election results for Newfield1
Year	Republican		Democratic		Third party(ies)	
Year	No.	%	No.	%	No.	%
2024	514	56.80%	381	42.10%	10	1.10%
2018	365	57.57%	245	38.64%	24	3.79%
2012	335	44.43%	401	53.18%	18	2.39%
2006	288	53.93%	231	43.26%	15	2.81%

United States Senate election results for Newfield2
Year	Republican		Democratic		Third party(ies)	
Year	No.	%	No.	%	No.	%
2020	530	52.95%	445	44.46%	26	2.60%
2014	239	48.88%	238	48.67%	12	2.45%
2013	149	52.65%	128	45.23%	6	2.12%
2008	346	43.69%	428	54.04%	18	2.27%

== Education ==
Newfield is a non-operating school district. In June 2009, the New Jersey Department of Education ruled that Newfield could end its relationship with the Buena Regional School District and as of the 2011–2012 school year could start sending incoming high school students in grades 7–9 to Delsea Regional High School.

Students in public school for kindergarten through sixth grade attend the Franklin Township Public Schools, as part of a sending/receiving relationship in which Newfield accounts for about 100 of the more than 1,400 students in the district. As of the 2018–19 school year, the district, comprised of three schools, had an enrollment of 1,408 students and 114.0 classroom teachers (on an FTE basis), for a student–teacher ratio of 12.4:1. Schools in the district (with 2018–19 enrollment data from the National Center for Education Statistics) are Mary F. Janvier Elementary School with 597 students in grades K–2, Main Road School with 394 students in grades 3–4, and Caroline L. Reutter School with 406 students in grades 5–6.

For seventh through twelfth grades, students attend the Delsea Regional School District, which also serves students from both Elk Township and Franklin Township. Students from Newfield attend the district as part of a sending/receiving relationship begun in September 2010 after Newfield ended its prior relationship with the Buena Regional School District. As of the 2018–19 school year, the regional high school district, comprising??? two schools, had an enrollment of 1,661 students and 123.8 classroom teachers (on an FTE basis), for a student–teacher ratio of 13.4:1. Schools in the district (with 2018–2019 enrollment data from the National Center for Education Statistics) are Delsea Regional Middle School with 563 students in grades 7 and 8, and Delsea Regional High School with 1,047 students in grades 9–12.

Edgarton Christian Academy is a non-denominational Christian K–8 school established in 2012. As of 2020 it leases a 29,000-square-foot (2,700 m^{2}) space in Newfield. When the 76-student The Ellison School in Vineland closed in December 2019, 25 of them moved to Edgarton. The school is building a 50,000-square-foot (4,600 m^{2}) permanent building on a 15-acre (6.1 ha) property in Buena, Atlantic County.

Notre Dame Regional School of the Roman Catholic Diocese of Camden had one of its two campuses in Newfield, with the other in Landisville in Buena. The school closed in 2012. It had 270 students at the time of closure. That year remnants of the school formed the non-Catholic Edgarton Christian Academy. 263 of the former Notre Dame students moved to Edgarton.

== Transportation ==
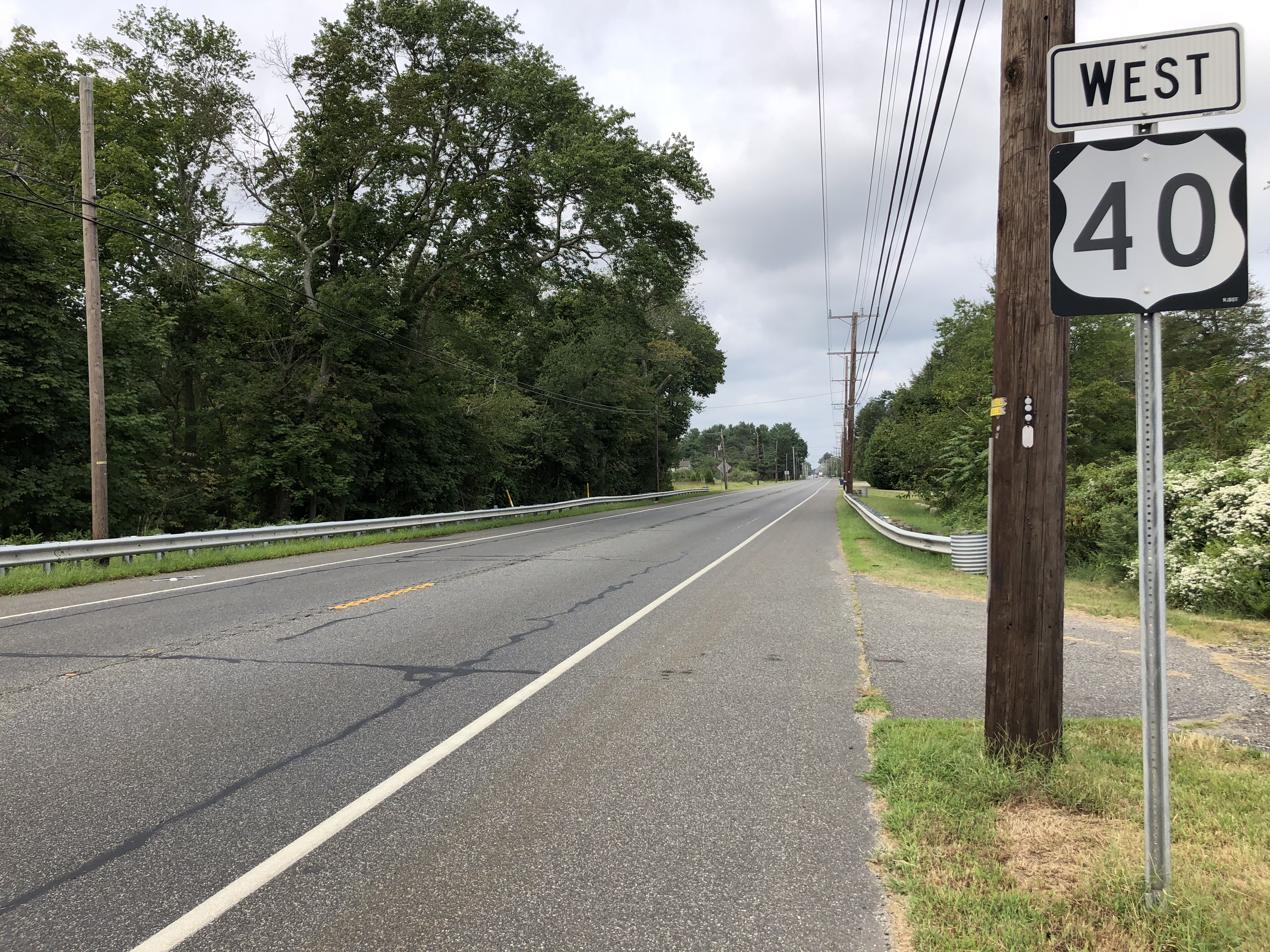
U.S. Route 40 westbound, along the north edge of Newfield

=== Roads and highways ===
As of May 2010, the borough had a total of 12.06 miles (19.41 km) of roadways, of which 9.67 miles (15.56 km) were maintained by the municipality, 2.27 miles (3.65 km) by Gloucester County and 0.12 miles (0.19 km) by the New Jersey Department of Transportation.

U.S. Route 40 is the main highway providing access to Newfield.

=== Public transportation ===
NJ Transit bus service is available between Millville and Philadelphia on the 408 route.

== Notable people ==
People who were born in, residents of, or otherwise closely associated with Newfield include:

- Job Bicknell Ellis (1829–1905), mycologist known for his collection and classification of fungi
- Herbert Fortier (1867–1949), a Canadian-born actor of the silent era
- Bessie Blount Griffin (1914–2009), physical therapist and inventor
