= Sweet Amalia Market and Kitchen =

Restaurant in Newfield, New Jersey, U.S.

- Interactive map of Sweet Amalia Market and Kitchen

Restaurant information
- Location: 994 Harding Highway, Newfield, New Jersey, United States
- Coordinates: 39°33′00″N 74°59′05″W
- Website: www.sweetamalia.com

Sweet Amalia Market and Kitchen is a restaurant in Newfield, New Jersey. It was included in The New York Times's 2024 list of the 50 best restaurants in the United States.
