= Landisville, New Jersey =

Populated place in Atlantic County, New Jersey, US

- Unincorporated community
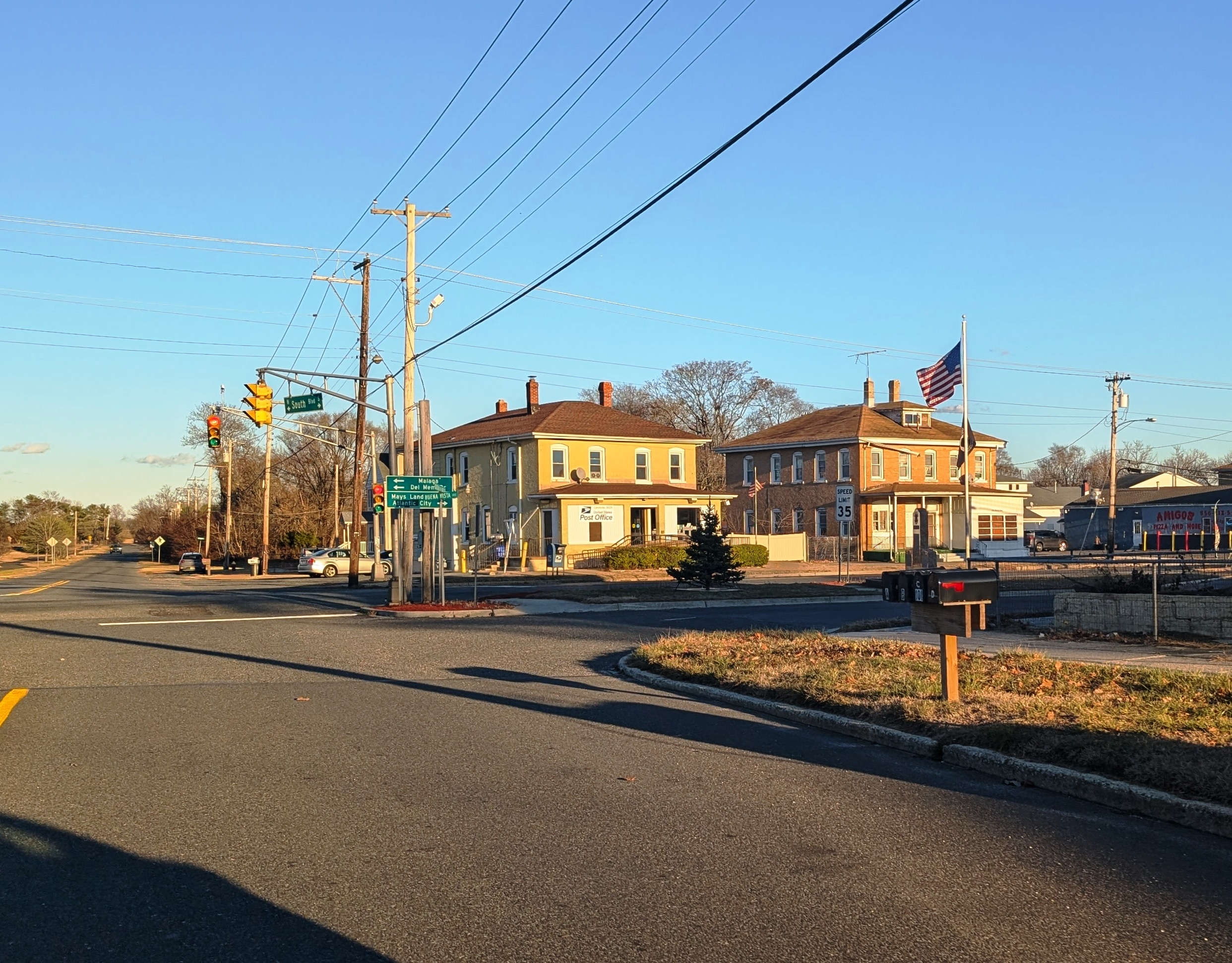
- Landisville post office

- Location within Atlantic County. Inset: Location of Atlantic County within New Jersey. Landisville (New Jersey) Landisville (the United States)
- Coordinates: 39°31′29″N 74°56′18″W
- Country: United States
- State: New Jersey
- County: Atlantic
- Borough: Buena
- Named after: Charles K. Landis
- Elevation: 112 ft (34 m)
- ZIP Code: 08326
- GNIS feature ID: 0877664

Landisville is an unincorporated community located within Buena in Atlantic County, in the U.S. state of New Jersey. The area is served as United States Postal Service ZIP Code 08326.

As of the 2000 United States census, the population for ZIP Code Tabulation Area 08326 was 1,280.

== History ==
Charles K. Landis was a land developer who was the driving force behind the creation of Hammonton and Vineland. Landis also had a hand in establishing other small towns, including Landisville. He planned to make it county seat of a new county called Landis County, which would incorporate land from the surrounding counties. However, the locals were against this, and began calling him "King Landis".

== Education ==
Buena Regional School District is the public school district, which operates Buena Regional High School.

Notre Dame Regional School of the Roman Catholic Diocese of Camden had one of its two campuses in Landisville, with the other in Newfield in Gloucester County. The school closed in 2012. It had 270 students at the time of closure. That year remnants of the school formed the non-Catholic Edgarton Christian Academy in Newfield. 263 of the former Notre Dame students moved to Edgarton.

== Attractions ==
- Bellview Winery
- St. Padre Pio Shrine
