= St. Padre Pio Shrine =

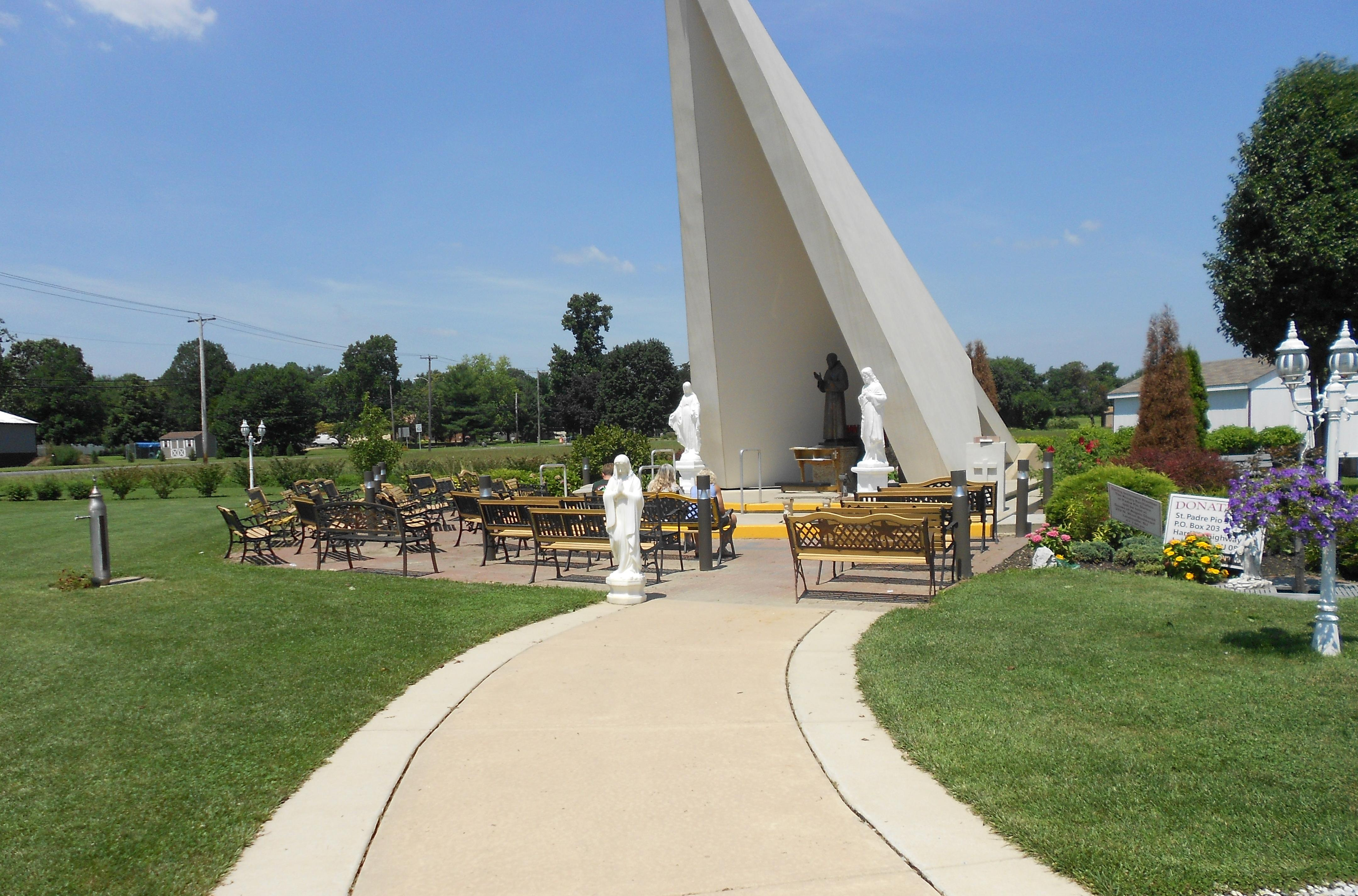
- St. Padre Pio Shrine
- 39°32′1″N 74°56′51″W
- Location: P.O. Box 203, Harding Highway, Landisville, N.J., 08326; Corner of Harding Highway (Route 40), Central Avenue and Weymouth Road (County Road 690) in Landisville, NJ
- Country: United States
- Denomination: Roman Catholicism
- Tradition: Folk Catholicism
- Website: www.stpadrepioshrinenj.org

History
- Status: Shrine
- Founded: 1997
- Founder(s): Marie and Pete D'Andrea

Architecture
- Architect: Ron Angelo
- Architectural type: Vernacular
- Completed: 2002

Specifications
- Height: 4 stories
- Materials: Stucco with steel frame

The St. Padre Pio Shrine is an outdoor Roman Catholic shrine in the Landisville section of Buena, New Jersey dedicated to the 20th-century Italian saint Padre Pio and completed in 2002.

== Description ==
The shrine was conceived in 1997 by Marie and Pete D'Andrea, Italian-American farmers in Buena, and was designed by local architect Ron Angelo. The structure was completed in 2002, and consists of a four-storey monument and three statues on ten acres of land. The monument is composed of a steel frame covered with white stucco, and inside the monument are the statues of Padre Pio, the Blessed Mother, and the Sacred Heart of Jesus. The shrine has a glove of Saint Padre Pio as a relic. Rosary prayer sessions are held at the shrine on Wednesday evenings (7:00 PM), and some individuals have claimed to have experienced miracles resulting from praying at the shrine. In 2009, the shrine suffered damage during a robbery attempt of the shrine's donation box.
