= Trnovec, Slovakia =

Trnovec
- Municipality
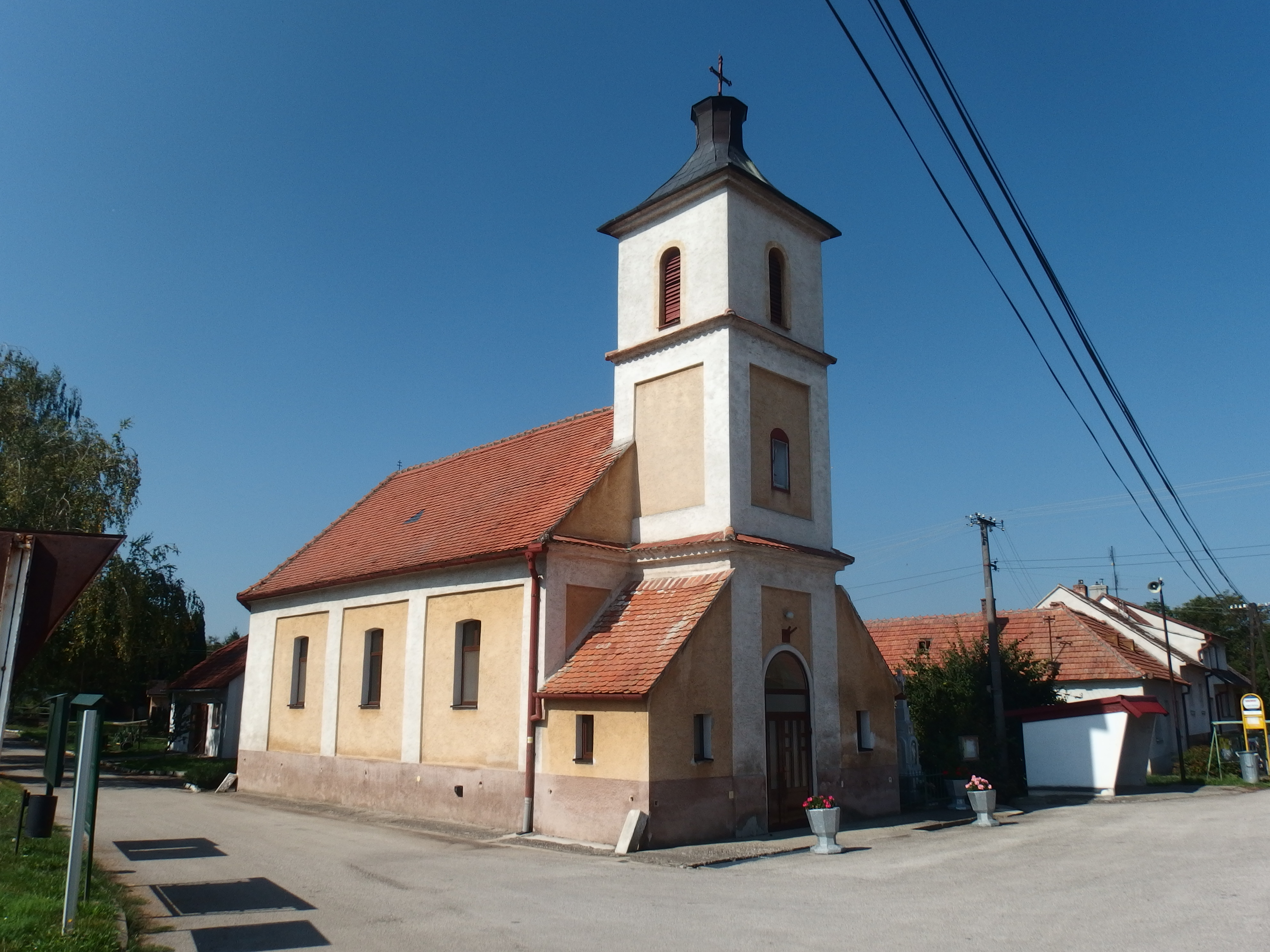

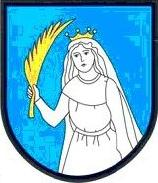
- Flag Coat of arms

- Location of Trnovec in the Trnava Region Location of Trnovec in Slovakia
- Coordinates: 48°48′N 17°11′E
- Country: Slovakia
- Region: Trnava Region
- District: Skalica District
- First mentioned: 1548

Area
  - Total: 2.52 km^{2} (0.97 sq mi)
- Elevation: 178 m (584 ft)

Population (2025)
  - Total: 293
- Time zone: UTC+1 (CET)
  - Summer (DST): UTC+2 (CEST)
- Postal code: 908 51
- Area code: +421 34
- Vehicle registration plate (until 2022): SI
- Website: trnovec.eu

Trnovec (Hungarian: Tövisfalva) is a village and municipality in Skalica District in the Trnava Region of western Slovakia.

== History ==
In historical records the village was first mentioned in 1548.

== Geography ==
The municipality lies at an altitude of 178 metres (584 ft) and covers an area of 2.52 km^{2} (0.97 sq mi) (2025).

== Population ==
Population statistic (10 years)
Year	1995	2005	2015	2025
Count	322	319	316	293
Difference		−0.93%	−0.94%	−7.27%

Population statistic
Year	2024	2025
Count	290	293
Difference		+1.03%

It has a population of 293 people (31 December 2025).

=== Ethnicity ===
Census 2021 (1+ %)
Ethnicity	Number	Fraction
Slovak	275	96.49%
Not found out	11	3.85%
Czech	3	1.05%
French	3	1.05%
Total	285	

In year 2021 was 285 people by ethnicity 275 as Slovak, 11 as Not found out, 3 as Czech, 3 as French and 1 as Austrian.

Note on population: The difference values of population numbers in the table "Population statistic" and in the sections "Ethnicity" & "Religion" is caused by the use of various statistical methods.

=== Religion ===
Census 2021 (1+ %)
Religion	Number	Fraction
Roman Catholic Church	179	62.81%
None	48	16.84%
Evangelical Church	46	16.14%
Not found out	8	2.81%
Total	285	

In year 2021 was 285 people by religion 179 from Roman Catholic Church, 48 from None, 46 from Evangelical Church, 8 from Not found out, 2 from Ad hoc movements, 1 from Eastern Orthodox Church and 1 from Greek Catholic Church.
