= Sharif Mobley =

American purported jihadist (born 1984)

- Born: January 19, 1984 (age 42); Buena, New Jersey, U.S.
- Children: 3 known children
- Parent(s): Charles and Cynthia Mobley
- Criminal charges: No formal charges filed. Allegations of murdering a guard and wounding another guard during an escape attempt.

Sharif Mobley (Arabic: شريف موبلي; born January 19, 1984) is an American purported jihadist who was initially arrested in Yemen January 26, 2010 by Yemeni counter-terrorism officers and charged with terrorism. There was a shooting during his arrest in which he was injured and taken to the hospital. During his initial stay at the hospital, two members of the US Government interviewed him. The US Embassy told his family they did not know his whereabouts. During the interviews with officials from the American government, he requested that information be passed on to his family. His family has reportedly not received any updates on his situation. After his recovery from a gun shot to the leg he was released into the custody of the Yemeni prison authorities. All charges of terrorism were dropped but he was not released from prison. Later he was charged with murdering a prison guard during an alleged escape attempt while at a follow-up visit to the hospital for complications from his initial arrest March 7, 2010. Mobley had moved to Yemen in 2008 and was in process getting visa updates from the US Embassy in preparation for returning to the US with his family when he was arrested. His family was able to return to the US shortly after his arrest.

During his incarceration in Yemen, his whereabouts have been in question. While he was in the custody of the normal Yemeni prison authorities, he was not brought to a number of trial dates and his lawyers do not have access to him. He was not present for four trial dates and the Yemeni prison authorities indicated he is no longer in their custody. The Yemeni Attorney General told the trial judge that he did not know where Sharif Mobley was physically located. US Embassy official William Lesh, said that the US Embassy had been in touch with him at an undisclosed location but would not reveal his whereabouts or which law enforcement group had him in their custody nor would the US Embassy assist his lawyers in contacting him.

Mobley is an American citizen who was raised as a Muslim. He stated he had traveled to Yemen for the purpose of studying Arabic and Islam, although U.S. officials initially claimed his purpose was to join a militant group. After his arrest, two US Government agents interviewed him several times and agreed that he was not a terrorist and he had no knowledge or information about activities of interest to the US Government. After charges of terrorism were dropped he was not released from prison. During a follow-up hospital visit for complications from the initial gunshot wound received during his arrest, he allegedly made an escape attempt, during which he allegedly shot two guards, one fatally, and was charged with murder.

Mobley's wife, Nzinga Islam, received a clandestine phone call from Sharif Mobley on September 15, 2014. Mobley has not appeared at a number of pre-trial hearings. It is unknown what happened to him after 2015.

== Biography ==
Mobley's parents were both born in the United States. Following his arrest, he was reported to have been of Somali descent, however law enforcement officials and family friends indicated that this information was incorrect. Mobley was raised in Atlantic County, New Jersey. He was a member of his high school wrestling team and practiced karate, earning a black belt, and graduated from high school in 2002. He moved to Philadelphia and then to Newark, Delaware. He is married, and has a daughter. In 2005, he earned $75 as an election day worker for the campaign of Governor Jon Corzine.

Mobley received an Islamic upbringing, and as a child, studied Islamic philosophy and Arabic language classes at Masjid Quba in Philadelphia, according to the imam, Anas Muhaimin. Mobley was described by former high school classmates as having had "strong religious views" at the time, and having become more radical following graduation. A former colleague who went on to do a military tour in Iraq, Roman Castro, said the last time he saw Mobley, in 2006, Mobley yelled at him: "Get the hell away from me, you Muslim killer!"

In Newark, Delaware, an imam, Abdel-Hadi Shehata, said Mobley had lived in the same apartment complex in the area and occasionally attended the Islamic Society of Delaware (ISD). Shehata said Mobley never discussed his political or religious perspectives with him, and would sometimes ask advice about Islamic religious rituals. Before 2008, he organized religious pilgrimages to the Middle East. Umar Hassan-El, assistant imam at, ISD's mosque in Wilmington, Delaware who shared a room with Mobley during the Hajj in 2004, said, "He gave no indication that he would join a group that he's alleged to be a part of right now. I never heard that boy ever talk about shooting anybody, killing anybody." The FBI and another law-enforcement stated that they did not know of any criminal charges against Mobley in the U.S.

== Yemen ==
In 2007, Mobley returned to Masjid Quba, attending on occasion and consulting the imam there about his plans to study in Yemen. The imam says he tried to discourage him from going to Yemen, suggesting that he instead go to Egypt or Morocco, but Mobley refused his advice and has not returned to the mosque for three years.

According to one report, Mobley had been in Yemen "for at least a year" prior to the shooting. At first he studied Arabic at a language institute in Sana'a and then Al-Eman University, which is run by Sheikh Abdul Majeed al-Zindani. A later report indicated he had traveled to Yemen two years prior. Two years before the shooting, he moved to Yemen supposedly to study Arabic and Islam, but a law enforcement official said he had traveled overseas for the purpose of joining a terrorist organization. The last time his mother Cynthia spoke to him was in January. A U.S. law enforcement official said the government had been aware of Mobley's possible extremist ties "long before" he was arrested.

Mobley was in contact with Anwar al-Awlaki, the al-Qaeda former imam now based in Yemen who was also in contact with three of the September 11 attacks hijackers, the Christmas Day Bomber, and Nidal Malik Hasan, the Fort Hood shooter, according to officials from the U.S. and Yemen. He hoped al-Awlaki would become his al Qaeda mentor, according to senior U.S. security officials.

=== Initial detention ===
Mobley was detained in early March 2010 in Sana'a, the capital of Yemen, one of 11 suspected al-Qaeda and al-Shabab affiliated militants; one suspected militant was killed during the raid resulting in the arrests. On Tuesday, March 3 (three days prior to the shooting), Yemeni security forces arrested 11 members of al-Qaeda during a raid on a location frequented by that cell in the Sawad Hansh area of Sana'a. A Yemeni source reported that following a thorough investigation and surveillance, Yemeni security forces raided a residence belonging to the father of one of the wanted militants. During the raid, the suspect's father opened fire on the security forces hitting one of the officers. The suspect's father was killed in the ensuing firefight.

Mobley was initially incorrectly identified in the Yemeni press as being a German citizen of African origin. On the day of the shooting, Mobley was incorrectly identified by News Yemen, a Yemeni English language newspaper, as "Shareef Mubaili, ... a German of Somali origin." CNN Arabic reported that the "German Mubaili" was severely injured during a shootout at the Republican Hospital after stealing a guard's gun. According to a "senior official", he was detained at a high security intelligence prison several months ago while the Yemeni Embassy in Washington, D.C., said he had been detained earlier this month. He is suspected of being a member of the same al-Qaeda branch as Umar Farouk Abdulmutallab, who failed in his attempt to bomb a passenger plane on Christmas Day, 2009.

=== Missed court dates ===
No formal charges have been brought against Sharif Mobley or presented to his legal advisors. The initial allegations relating to terrorism were dropped. There are no legal proceedings against him for any previously asserted connections to terrorism or terrorist-related activities, or for any association with any terrorist or alleged terrorists. There are no legal proceedings against him for any association with any terrorist organization or any terrorism-related conspiracies. Mobley is currently alleged to have killed a guard while attempting an escape from a hospital where he was being treated while in custody of the Yemen prison authorities.

His is currently in the custody of the Yemen National Security Bureau (NSB). His physical location is officially unknown. Although consular staff have seen and talked with him they are not able to disclose his location as US State Department Privacy Act rules prohibit disclosing information regarding U.S Citizens Missing Abroad.

A U.S. law called the Privacy Act is designed to protect the privacy rights of U.S. citizens. The Act states that we may not reveal information regarding a U.S. citizen's location, welfare, intentions, or problems to anyone, including the citizen's family members and Congressional representatives, without the written consent of that individual. Although we recognize that this law may occasionally cause distress to concerned families, we must comply with the provisions of the Privacy Act if the individual has asked us not to share information about him or her.

Mobley has not been brought to the following trial dates.

Missed Court Date	Additional information
April 2, 2014	Due to judicial strike.
June 11, 2014	
June 25, 2014	Judge Abdelwali al-Shaabani orders Yemen Attorney General Ali Alwash to bring Mobley to court.
August 20, 2014	Yemen Attorney General Ali Alwash tells Judge Abdelwali al-Shaabani he is unsure where Mobley is located
September 10, 2014	

=== Continued detention ===
Mobley was initially held in the Yemen Central Prison located in Sana'a. Sometime after February 27, 2014 when he was last seen by his lawyers at the Central Prison, he was moved to an unknown location but believed to be a prison run by the Yemen National Security Bureau (NSB) and is now under control of the Yemen Specialized Criminal Court.

On September 26, 2014, Nzinga Islam learned her husband was believed to be in the custody of the Yemen NSB.

==== Allegations of unsanitary conditions ====
On September 11, 2014, Sharif Mobley made an unapproved/unofficial cellphone call to his wife. During a 10-minute conversation, Mobley described enduring acts of brutality and torture. One of these, was being forced to drink "water out of bottles that had contained urine".

Carlton Benson, a consular officer at the US embassy in Yemen, confirmed that Mobley is held in unsanitary conditions and did have to drink from a "dirty" glass. In an email dated September 29, 2014, he also disclosed that Mobley is not allowed any utensils. Without utensils Mobley would have to eat with his hands or if his hands are shackled, directly with his mouth. Benson requested the Mobley family send a care package to the US State Department for Mobley, with clean cups and plastic utensils. He was uncertain if he could persuade the prison authorities to allow Mobley the plastic utensils. A U.S. consular officer, during a consular visit to Mobley in mid/late September, questioned a guard who confirmed the mistreatment.

==== UN Office of the High Commissioner for Human Rights ====
In October 2014 the UN Office of the High Commissioner for Human Rights OHCHR, Working Group on Enforced or Involuntary Disappearances, questioned Yemen and the US regarding Mr Mobley's disappearance. Following an investigation that started in May 2014, the OHCHR requested that Yemen ensure that Mr. Mobley would not be detained arbitrarily or subject to unfair legal proceedings.

=== Yemen ===
In January 2015, an uprising by Houthi/Shiite groups opposed to the Yemeni government led to their takeover of the capital city, Sana'a. The situation deteriorated further in February 2015 when the government of President Abd-Rabbu Mansour Hadi collapsed following the Houthis' seizure of the capital. As a result, the United States closed its embassy in Sana'a and evacuated all diplomatic staff, according to US State Department spokesperson Jen Psaki. By May 2015, the conflict had escalated significantly, prompting Saudi Arabia to launch airstrikes on Sana'a. Among the targets hit was the prison complex where Mobley was reportedly being held unofficially. Reports from May 30 indicated that Mobley, along with other Americans still in Yemen, may have fallen into Houthi custody.

== Shooting ==
Following his arrest, he claimed he was sick and was transferred to the Republican Hospital, also in Sana'a. He was treated for complications involving a metal rod which had previously been implanted in his leg. He spent a week at the hospital, where he befriended the guards assigned to him, praying with them, reading Qur'an together, and asking them to teach him Arabic.

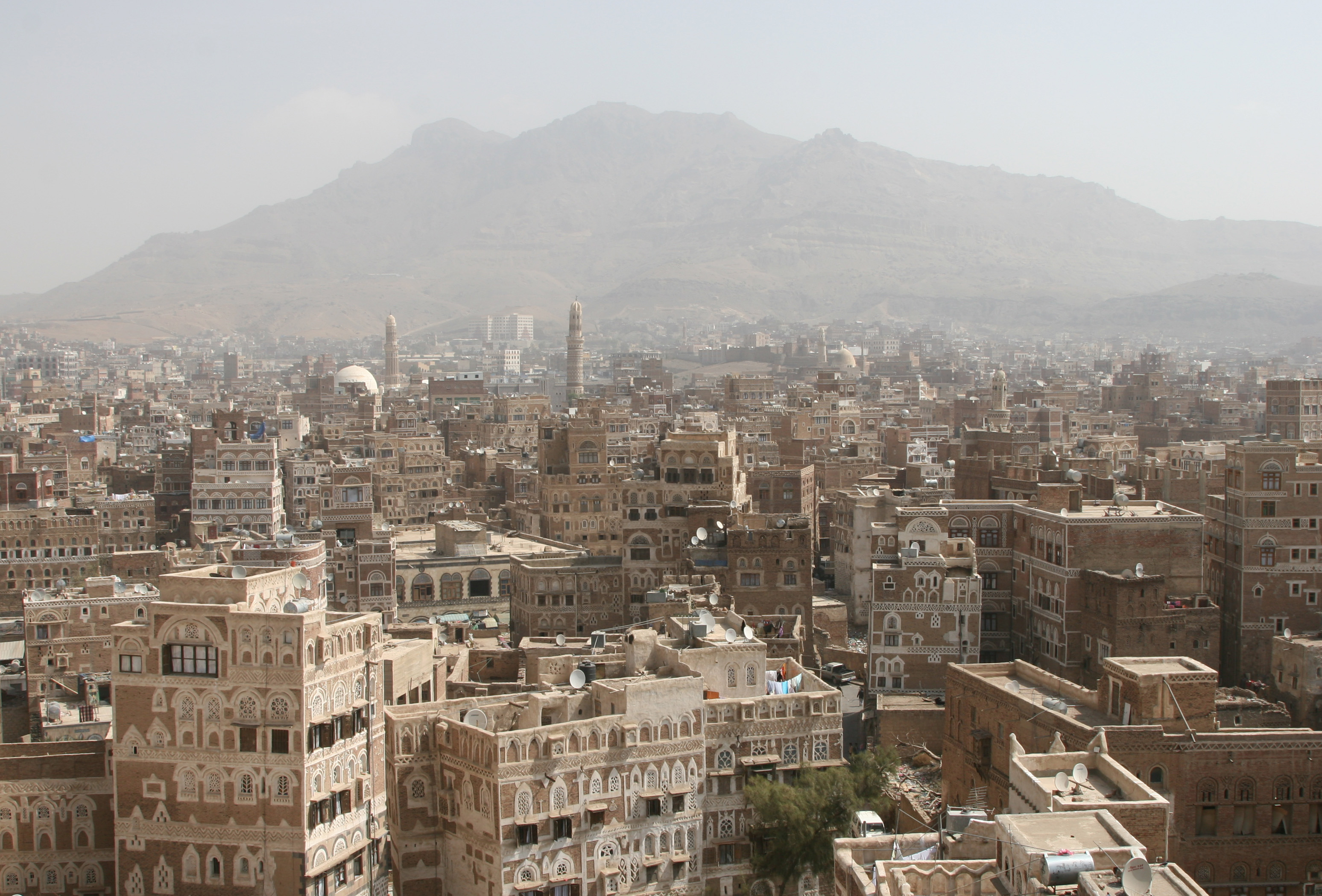
The shooting occurred in the Republican Hospital in Sana'a.

On March 7, 2010, he persuaded a guard to unshackle him at prayer time. The guard then went into the washroom to perform the ablution required for prayers, and reportedly left his gun unattended on a chair. At this time, a second guard who had been present left the room and Mobley picked up the gun, and as the first guard exited the washroom Mobley shot him once in the head and then in the chest, killing him almost instantly. Another guard heard the gunshots and entered the room and was shot by Mobley in the kidney and abdomen but had called for reinforcements prior to entering the room and survived.

The entire sixth floor of the hospital was sealed until the arrival of additional security forces accompanied by members of the anti-terrorism unit. He was chased through the hospital, and engaged in a shootout that ended with his capture after he had barricaded himself in one of the rooms in the hospital by anti-terrorism police whose smoke grenades ignited a small fire. The siege lasted for three hours before Mobley was captured after being severely wounded and "a number of other individuals" were shot by him. According to Albasha, the embassy spokesman, the guard who had been wounded in the shootout was in serious condition.

According to the Arabic version of CNN, Mobley allegedly killed two Yemeni guards during the shootout and critically wounded a third. CNN Arabic reported that this "was contributed by a Yemeni official in statement to CNN". This, however, contradicts numerous English sources, including The New York Times, The Wall Street Journal, Newsweek, Associated Press, ABC News, as well as the English version of CNN, and News Yemen, which all state that one guard was killed and another critically wounded. The same article in Arabic CNN, in a detailed description of the shooting, also mentioned only one guard being killed.

== Investigation ==
The U.S. government was previously aware of Mobley's extremist ties, but Yemeni officials claimed he had not been on their list of wanted militants. According to a senior official involved in the case, the attack demonstrates that Mobley "is highly trained in the use of firearms", and according to The New York Times, the attack indicates that he had a "level of training and cunning characteristic of the terror network."

The official also criticized the guards for their negligence in handling Mobley. He is likely to be tried in Yemen as opposed to being returned to the U.S., a U.S. official stated. According to Yemeni law, killing a guard could be punishable by execution by firing squad.

The Baltimore, Maryland office of the FBI is working on the case. An unnamed U.S. law-enforcement official described the investigation:

The U.S. government is in the process of reviewing his past activities in the United States, including his employment as a contract laborer at several U.S. nuclear power plants between 2002 and 2008. At this time, we are not aware of any security-related concerns or incidents related to Mr. Mobley's employment at these locations; however we continue to review his past activities.

Mobley's parents were interviewed by the FBI. His mother denied the accusations against her son, describing him as "an excellent person who's never been in trouble" and "a good Muslim". His father, Charles Mobley, said he knew nothing of his son's current situation, adding, "I can tell you this: He's no terrorist." Sharif Mobley has not issued any public statement since the incident. Asked about Mobley's apparent links to al-Awlaki, a Yemeni embassy spokesman in Washington, D.C., said he was not surprised, because al-Awlaki: "is a fixture in jihad 101." Mobley remained in the custody of the Yemeni government on charges of capital murder until October 2010, and was charged with killing one guard and wounding another by a criminal court on October 27.

Two U.S. government agents interrogated Mobley after his arrest. "Matt" from the FBI and "Khan" from the DOD conducted a number of interviews with Mobley while he was hospitalized and recovering from being shot during his arrest by Yemeni Security Agents. The un-redacted portions FBI report log shows the Mr. Mobley was concerned for the safety of his family and requested that the US Agents and US Embassy in Yemen assist his family in leaving the country.

From the un-redacted portion of FBI report log of the January 31, 2010, hospital visit:

Mobley also repeatedly asked to use a phone and for a lawyer. During the course of the interview, Mobley repeatedly expressed concern for his wife.... Mobley repeatedly instructed [redacted] to tell his wife that he ordered her to leave the country with the children and return to the us .... Mobley initially requested that the USG visit his house; [redacted] ...

Additional topics reported by Mobley's lawyers at Reprieve include "threats" made against his family if he did not cooperate with the interrogators.

While in secret detention he was interrogated by two US agents, threatened with further abuse (including rape, and the rape of his wife)...

The Senate Intelligence Committee report on CIA torture released December 9, 2014, contains passages that confirm that threats of rape and family harm were given during interrogations. Reports and analysis from the release report include:

CIA interrogators, the committee charged, told detainees they would hurt their children and "sexually assault" or kill their wives." And CIA interrogators, the committee charged, told detainees they would hurt detainees' children and "sexually assault" or "cut a [detainee's] mother's throat".

News reports from 2010 include statements of similar threats made to Mobley's family and his children.

"They held up the keys to his house in front of his face," Cori Crider [his lawyer] said. "They told him his wife would go to prison and the kids would go to an orphanage. He was terrified that she was going to be assaulted."

Virginia lawyer and executive director of National Security Counselors, Kel McClanahan, filed a lawsuit on March 21, 2014, in U.S. federal court in Washington, D.C. demanding records under the Freedom of Information Act FOIA to help him determine whether the FBI tapped into his law firm's computers as part of an investigation into how he came to possess classified documents. McClanahan claims that the FBI targeted his law firm because of his assistance in the Mobley case on behalf of the British Human Rights organization Reprieve. His law firm had been retained to handle all FOIA litigation related to several cases, including Mobley. The FBI interest in McClanahan's law firm pertained to several sets of documents obtained with FOIA requests. Some of these documents had been released without proper redactions and he contacted the authorities to inform them of the errors. The documents are unrelated to Sharif Mobley.

The document relating to Mobley was a copy of an FBI account of an April 7, 2010, interview that U.S. agents had conducted with Mobley in Yemen. The FBI had given the un-redacted version of the document to the Yemeni government, and this version was filed in the Yemeni courts on May 23, 2012. Mobley's Yemeni lawyers passed the document to the UK Reprieve legal team and the Reprieve legal team passed it to McClanahan as part of their court documentation package.

Upon comparing the document officially filed with the Yemeni Courts and the redacted version obtained under the FOIA request, McClanahan alleged that the redactions were done to hide FBI misconduct and possible violations of the law, not because it revealed sensitive national security information. McClanahan contacted the Department of Justice regarding these alleged violations. He also met numerous times with the FBI to resolve issues over the documents. The FBI demanded he delete all documents, surrender his computers, allow review/access to his email and subject his premises to search without warrants. After several meetings with the FBI, they provided a new redacted version of the FBI Mobley Interview. McClanahan became concerned that the FBI was taping his email and interfering with his internet connection, after the agents had requested specific information about his Internet service provider and details about his email account. Under the Electronic Communications Privacy Act, the FBI does not require a court order to obtain emails from an Internet provider that are older than 180 days and McClanahan suspected that the FBI had issued an administrative subpoena for his emails.

During a February 8, 2013, meeting a government prosecutor told McClanahan that neither he nor the National Security Counselors group were the target of any ongoing investigations but McClanahan remained unconvinced and filed his own FOIA request seeking information about the FBI Mobley Interview document and related investigations. As of March 25, 2014, all of these requests have been denied on the grounds that they would interfere with an ongoing investigation.

== See also ==
- Homegrown terrorism
- List of people who disappeared mysteriously (2000–present)
- Proxy detention
