= Physiological psychology =

Section of behavioral neuroscience

human brain

Physiological psychology is a subdivision of behavioral neuroscience (biological psychology) that studies the neural mechanisms of perception and behavior through direct manipulation of the brains of nonhuman animal subjects in controlled experiments. This field of psychology takes an empirical and practical approach when studying the brain and human behavior. Most scientists in this field believe that the mind is a phenomenon that stems from the nervous system. By studying and gaining knowledge about the mechanisms of the nervous system, physiological psychologists can uncover many truths about human behavior. Unlike other subdivisions within biological psychology, the main focus of psychological research is the development of theories that describe brain-behavior relationships.

Physiological psychology studies many topics relating to the body's response to a behavior or activity in an organism. It concerns the brain cells, structures, components, and chemical interactions that are involved in order to produce actions. Psychologists in this field usually focus their attention to topics such as sleep, emotion, ingestion, senses, reproductive behavior, learning/memory, communication, psychopharmacology, and neurological disorders. The basis for these studies all surround themselves around the notion of how the nervous system intertwines with other systems in the body to create a specific behavior.

== Nervous system ==
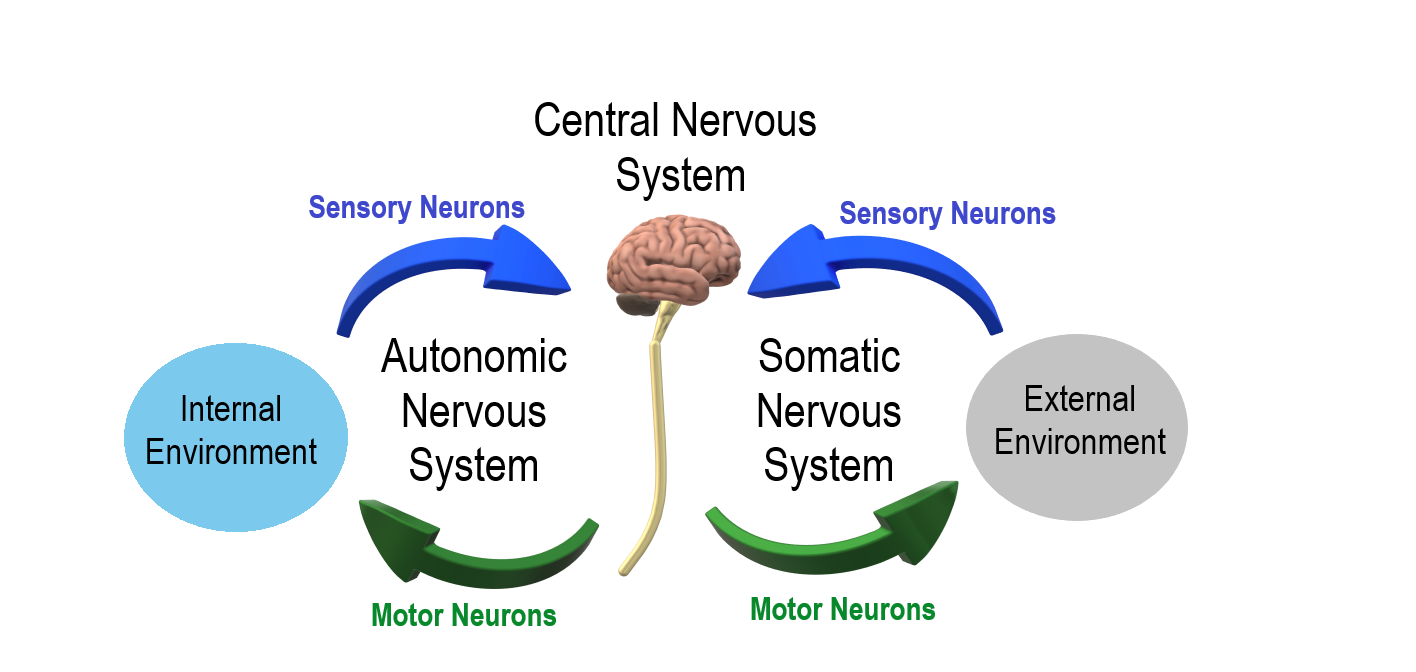
nervous system

The nervous system can be described as a control system that interconnects the other body systems. It consists of the brain, spinal cord, and other nerve tissues throughout the body. The system's primary function is to react to internal and external stimuli in the human body. It uses electrical and chemical signals to send out responses to different parts of the body, and it is made up of nerve cells called neurons. Through the system, messages are transmitted to body tissues such as a muscle. There are two major subdivisions in the nervous system known as the central and peripheral nervous system.

The central nervous system is composed of the brain and spinal cord. The brain is the control center of the body and contains millions of neural connections. This organ is responsible for sending and receiving messages from the body and its environment. Each part of the brain is specialized for different aspects of the human being. For example, the temporal lobe has a major role in vision and audition, whereas the frontal lobe is significant for motor function and problem solving. The spinal cord is attached to the brain and serves as the main connector of nerves and the brain.

The nerve tissue that lies outside of the central nervous system is collectively known as the peripheral nervous system. This system can be further divided into the autonomic and somatic nervous system. The autonomic system can be referred to as the involuntary component that regulates bodily organs and mechanisms, such as digestion and respiration. The somatic system is responsible for relaying messages back and forth from the brain to various parts of the body, whether it is taking in sensory stimuli and sending it to the brain or sending messages from the brain in order for muscles to contract and relax.

== Emotion ==
Emotion constitutes a major influence for determining human behaviors. It is thought that emotions are predictable and are rooted in different areas in our brains, depending on what emotion it evokes. An emotional response can be divided into three major categories including behavioral, autonomic, and hormonal.

- The behavioral component is explained by the muscular movements that accompany the emotion. For example, if a person is experiencing fear, a possible behavioral mechanism would be to run away from the fear factor.
- The autonomic aspect of an emotion provides the ability to react to the emotion. This would be the fight-or-flight response that the body automatically receives from the brain signals.
- Lastly, hormones released facilitate the autonomic response. For example, the autonomic response, which has sent out the fight-or-flight response, would be aided by the release of such chemicals like epinephrine and norepinephrine, both secreted by the adrenal gland, in order to further increase blood flow to aid in muscular rejuvenation of oxygen and nutrients.

Emotions in decision making can cause irrational outcomes. Two types of emotions occur in the decision-making process which anticipating emotions and immediate emotions. Loss and gain in anticipated emotions people will experience the outcomes differently depending on the situation. Immediate emotions are considered true emotions which integrates cognition with somatic or bodily components of the autonomic nervous system to express the emotion externally.

Emotion activates several areas of the brain inside the limbic system and varies per emotion:

- Fear: the amygdala is the main component for acquisition, storage, and expression of fear.
  - Lesions on the central amygdaloid can lead to disruptions in the behavioral and autonomic emotional responses of fear.
- Anger/aggression: the hypothalamus and amygdala work together to send inhibitory/excitatory impulses to the periaqueductal gray which then carries out usually defensive behaviors.
- Happiness: the ventral tegmental area works closely with the prefrontal cortex to produce emotions of happiness as they lie upon the same dopamine pathways.

Several hormones are secreted in response to emotions and vary from general emotional tuning to specific hormones released from certain emotions alone:

- Emotions are seen as a positive feedback cycle in the brain. Oxytocin acts to over-sensitize the limbic system to emotional responses leading to even larger emotional responses. Under the response to emotions, even more oxytocin is secreted therefore increasing the response further. In addition to the general effects oxytocin has on the limbic system, it provides a more specific purpose as well in the body. It acts as an anxiety suppressant mainly found in stressful and social situations. It provides a calming effect to the body during these high stress situations. Oxytocin is also seen as a strong hormone in maternal attachment and aggression found in new mothers. This hormone also plays a slight part in the female desire to pair and mate.
- Another hormone found in the direct response from emotion is adrenocorticotropic hormone (ACTH) secreted in response to fearful stimuli. ACTH is secreted by the posterior pituitary in response to fear and plays a role in the facilitation or inhibition of behaviors and actions to follow. In most cases, a high ACTH secretion will lead to the inhibition of actions that would produce the same fearful response that just occurred.
- Happiness is primarily controlled by the levels of dopamine and serotonin in the body. Both are monoamine neurotransmitters that act on different sites in the body. Serotonin acts on receptors in the gastrointestinal tract while dopamine acts on receptors in the brain, while both performing similar functions. Dopamine is known to be the primary hormone acting on the brain's reward system, while this has recently begun to be a point of debate in the research community. Serotonin has less known on how it carries out its function in reducing depression, but only that it works. Specific-serotonin reuptake inhibitors (SSRI) are the type of drug given to patients with depression in which the serotonin is left in the synapse to continue to be absorbed in the body.

== Sleep ==
Sleep is a behavior that is provoked by the body initiating the feeling of sleepiness in order for people to rest for usually several hours at a time. During sleep, there is a reduction of awareness, responsiveness, and movement. On average, an adult human sleeps between seven and eight hours per night. There is a minute percentage that sleeps less than five to six hours, which is also a symptom of sleep deprivation, and an even smaller percentage of people who sleep more than ten hours a day. Oversleeping has been shown to have a correlation with higher mortality. There are no benefits to oversleeping and it can result in sleep inertia, which is the feeling of drowsiness for a period of time after waking. There are two phases of sleep: rapid eye movement (REM) and Non-REM sleep (NREM).

REM sleep is the less restful stage in which one dreams and experiences muscle movements or twitches. Also during this stage in sleep, a person's heart rate and breathing are typically irregular. The electrical activity in the brain during REM sleep causes signals the same overwhelming intensity of being awake inside. The same brain energy is used during REM sleep measured by oxygen and glucose metabolism equally to being awake. EEGs are used to observe these patterns in the brain during the different stages of REM and Non-REM sleep.

Non-REM sleep, also sometimes referred to as slow-wave sleep, is associated with deep sleep. The body's blood pressure, heart rate, and breathing are generally significantly decreased compared to an alert state. Dreaming can occur in this state; however a person is not able to remember them due to how deep in sleep they are and the inability for consolidation to occur in memory. REM cycles typically occur in 90 minute intervals and increase in length as the amount of sleep in one session progresses. In a typical night's rest, a person will have about four to six cycles of REM and Non-REM sleep.

Sleep is important for the body in order to restore itself from the depletion of energy during wakefulness and allows for recovery since cell division occurs the fastest during the Non-REM cycle. Sleep is also important for maintaining the functioning of the immune system, as well as helping with the consolidation of information previously learned and experienced into the memory. If sleep deprived, recall of information is typically decreased. Dreams that occur during sleep have been shown to increase mental creativity and problem solving skills.

As the period of time since the last Non-REM cycle has occurred increases, the body's drive towards sleep also increases. Physical and environmental factors can have a great influence over the body's drive towards sleep. Mental stimulation, pain and discomfort, higher/lower than normal environmental temperatures, exercise, light exposure, noise, hunger, and overeating all result in an increase in wakefulness. On the contrary, sexual activity and some foods such as carbohydrates and dairy products promote sleep.

== Careers in the field ==
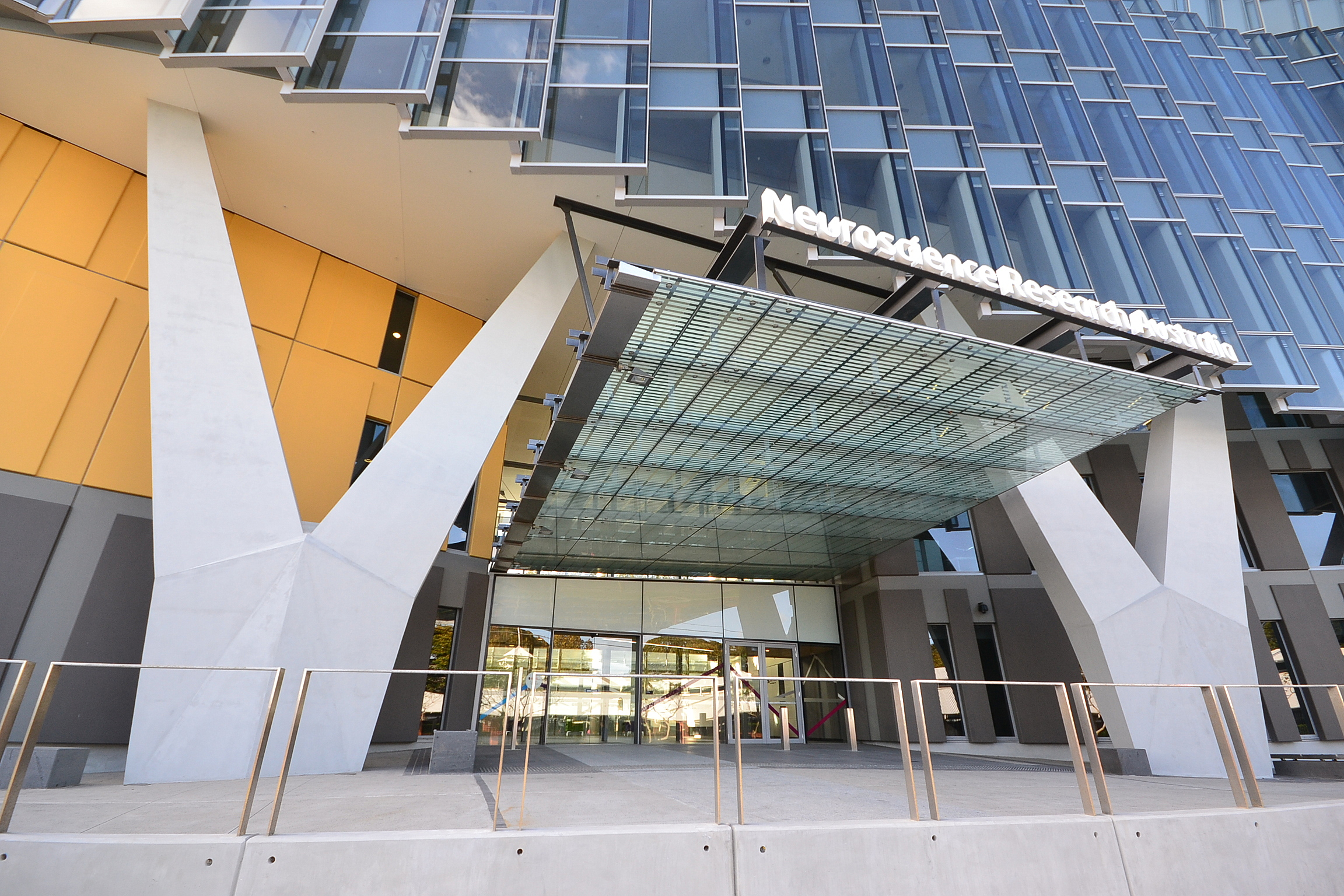

In the past, physiological psychologists received a good portion of their training in psychology departments of major universities. Currently, physiological psychologists are also being trained in behavioral neuroscience or biological psychology programs that are affiliated with psychology departments, or in interdisciplinary neuroscience programs. Most physiological psychologists receive PhDs in neuroscience or a related subject and either teach and carry out research at colleges or universities, are employed for research for government laboratories or other private organizations, or are hired by pharmaceutical companies to study the effects that various drugs have on an individual's behavior.

Various forms of psychology concentrations are included in the sectors of health psychology, forensic psychology, clinical psychology, industrial and organizational psychology, and school psychology. Health psychology is a discipline that understands the psychological, behavioral, and cultural aspects that affect the physical health and illnesses within individuals. A psychologists with the focus of health psychology would have a biopsychosocial model approach with patients. Forensic psychologists usually have a background in criminal justice and pursue a master's in forensic psychology. Clinical psychology can be pursued in education by a master's or a PsyD program to receive more research or academic experience. This approach will include psychological assessment, consultation, and psychotherapy. Industrial and organizational psychology focuses on the corporate world to help the function of the work flow for organizations and their relationships with employees. This helps increase job satisfaction and work goals by using surveys and reinforcement with a reward system between employee and employer. School psychologists work in education to partner with schools to provide in house counseling assistance.

== Medical Treatment ==
Pharmacology is biomedical science that helps in the branch of research to discover the characteristics of chemicals that affect biological functionalism and the relationship to other parts of the body. The use of science benefits the knowledge on drugs that then become part of the traditional medical practice that patients may benefit from. Most people cannot afford mental healthcare so they seek the options from clinics and any assistance that is offered through work or school. Medical insurance can help cover expenses and government assisted insurances can help as well. There are programs like company Betterhelp who provide mental health services at discounted rates as well as financial aid that can help reduce costs.

== See also ==
- Cognitive neuroscience
- Psychophysics
- Psychophysiology
