= List of schools in the Roman Catholic Archdiocese of San Francisco =

This is a list of schools of the Roman Catholic Archdiocese of San Francisco.

== Universities and Seminaries ==
Marin County

- Dominican University of California (Dominican Sisters of San Rafael) (San Rafael)

San Francisco

- University of San Francisco (Jesuit)

San Mateo County

- Notre Dame de Namur University (Sisters of Notre Dame de Namur) (Belmont)
- Saint Patrick's Seminary (Menlo Park)

== High schools ==
Marin County

- Marin Catholic High School (Kentfield in unincorporated Marin County)
- San Domenico School (San Anselmo)

San Francisco

- Archbishop Riordan High School
- Nativity High School (San Francisco, CA)
- Convent of the Sacred Heart High School
- Immaculate Conception Academy
- Mercy High School (San Francisco)
- Sacred Heart Cathedral Preparatory
- St. Ignatius College Preparatory
- Stuart Hall High School

San Mateo County

- Junípero Serra High School (San Mateo)
- Mercy High School (Burlingame)
- Notre Dame High School (Belmont)
- Sacred Heart Preparatory (Atherton)
- Woodside Priory School, Portola Valley

== Grade schools ==
Grades are PK-8 unless otherwise specified.

Marin County

- Our Lady of Loretto School (Novato)
- Saint Anselm School (San Anselmo)
- Saint Hilary School (Tiburon)
- Saint Isabella School (San Rafael)
- Saint Patrick School (Larkspur)
- Saint Raphael School (San Rafael)

San Francisco

- Convent of the Sacred Heart (Girls only)
- De Marillac Academy (grades 4-8)
- Ecole Notre Dame des Victoires
- Father Sauer Academy (grades 6-8)
- School of the Epiphany
- Holy Name School
- Mission Dolores Academy
- Our Lady of the Visitacion School
- Saint Anne School
- Saint Anthony-Immaculate School
- Saint Brendan School
- Saint Brigid School
- Saint Cecilia School
- Saint Finn Barr Catholic School
- Saint Gabriel School
- Saint James School
- Saint John School
- Saint Monica School
- Saint Paul School
- Saint Peter School - Mission District, San Francisco - It opened in 1878. Previously its students were Irish or Italian American, but by 2014 95% of the student body was Latino and about two thirds were categorized as economically disadvantaged. Enrollment was once around 600 but by 2014 was around 300 due to gentrification. Its yearly per-student cost was $5,800 while yearly tuition, the lowest in the archdiocese, was $3,800.
- Saint Philip School
- Saint Stephen School
- Saint Thomas More School
- Saint Thomas the Apostle School
- Saint Vincent de Paul School
- Saints Peter & Paul School (Saints_Peter_and_Paul_Church,_San_Francisco)
- Stuart Hall for Boys (Boys only)

San Mateo County

- All Souls School (South San Francisco)
- Good Shepherd School (Pacifica)
- Holy Angels School (Colma)
- Immaculate Heart of Mary School (Belmont)
- Nativity School (Menlo Park)
- Notre Dame Elementary School (Belmont)
- Our Lady of Angels School (Burlingame)
- Our Lady of Mercy School (Daly City)
- Our Lady of Mount Carmel School (Redwood City)
- Our Lady of Perpetual Help School (Daly City)
- Sacred Heart Schools (Atherton)
- Saint Catherine of Siena School (Burlingame)
- Saint Charles School (San Carlos)
- Saint Dunstan School (Millbrae)
- Saint Gregory School (San Mateo)
- Saint Matthew School (San Mateo)
- Saint Pius School (Redwood City)
- Saint Raymond School (Menlo Park)
- Saint Robert School (San Bruno)
- Saint Timothy School (San Mateo)
- Saint Veronica School (South San Francisco)
- Woodside Priory Middle School (Portola Valley (grades 6-8)
