= Houston Area Independent Schools =

The Houston Area Independent Schools (or HAIS) is a non-profit association of more than 50 private schools located in the Houston, Texas area of the United States.

== Member schools ==
=== EE-12 ===
- St. Stephen's Episcopal School Houston (Houston)

=== PreK-12 ===
- The Awty International School (Houston)
- The Banff School (unincorporated Harris County)
- Bay Area Christian School (League City)
- British School of Houston (Houston)
- Covenant Christian School (unincorporated Montgomery County)
- Duchesne Academy of the Sacred Heart (Houston)
- Fort Bend Christian Academy (Sugar Land)
- The John Cooper School (The Woodlands)
- The Kinkaid School (Hunters Creek Village)
- Lutheran South Academy (Houston)
- Rosehill Christian School (unincorporated Harris County)
- St. Francis Episcopal School (Piney Point Village)
- St. Thomas' Episcopal School (Houston)
- School of the Woods (Houston)
- Second Baptist School (Houston)
- The Village School (Houston)
- Westbury Christian School (Houston)
- Woodlands Christian Academy (unincorporated Montgomery County)

=== K-12 ===
- The Briarwood School (Houston)
- The Monarch School (Houston)
- St. John's School (Houston)

=== PK-9 ===
- St. Catherine's Montessori School (Houston)

=== EE-8 ===
- Honor Roll School (Sugar Land)

=== PK-8 ===
- Annunciation Orthodox School (Houston)
- The Branch School (Houston)
- Christ Community School (The Woodlands)
- Clay Road Baptist School (Houston)
- Corpus Christi Catholic School (Houston)
- First Baptist Academy (Houston)
- Grace School (Houston)
- Holy Spirit Episcopal School (Houston)
- Holy Trinity Episcopal School (Houston)
- Pilgrim Lutheran School (Houston)
- The Post Oak School (Bellaire)
- Presbyterian School (Houston)
- The Regis School of the Sacred Heart (Houston)
- River Oaks Baptist School (Houston)
- St. Anne Catholic School (Houston)
- St. Francis de Sales School (Houston)
- St. Francis Episcopal Day School (Piney Point Village)
- St. Mark's Episcopal School (West University Place)
- St. Mark Lutheran School (Houston)
- St. Theresa Catholic School (Houston)
- St. Thomas More Parish School (Houston)
- The Woodlands Methodist School

=== K-8 ===
- Grace School (Houston)
- The Joy School (Houston)

=== 4-8 ===
- Trafton Academy (Houston)

=== Secondary schools ===
==== 6-12 ====
- The Emery/Weiner School (Houston)
- Memorial Private School (West Houston)

==== 9-12 ====
- Episcopal High School (Bellaire)
- Incarnate Word Academy (Houston)
- Saint Agnes Academy (Houston)
- St. Pius X High School (Houston)
- St. Thomas High School (Houston)
- Strake Jesuit College Preparatory (Houston)

=== Primary schools ===
==== EE-5 ====
- The Parish School (Houston)

==== PreK-5 ====
- Ascension Episcopal School (Houston)
- Beth Yeshurun Day School (Houston)
- The Fay School (Houston)
- The Shlenker School (Houston)
- Yorkshire Academy (Houston)
