= Duchesne Academy of the Sacred Heart =

Duchesne Academy of the Sacred Heart can refer to:

- Duchesne Academy of the Sacred Heart (Omaha, Nebraska)
- Duchesne Academy of the Sacred Heart (Houston, Texas)
