= Sacred Heart Schools, Atherton =

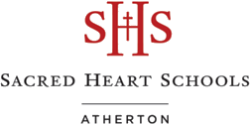

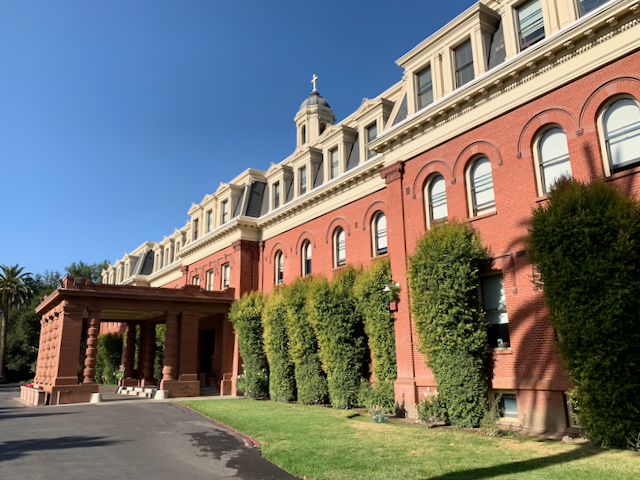
- Image of the main building

Location
- 150 Valparaiso Avenue; Atherton, California 94027; United States; 37°26′55″N 122°11′48″W

Information
- Other names: SHS; Sacred Heart; Sacred Heart, Atherton
- Type: Private school
- Religious affiliation: Roman Catholic
- Established: 1898; 128 years ago
- Oversight: Society of the Sacred Heart
- NCES School ID: 00073771
- Director: Richard A. Dioli
- Grades: PK–12
- Gender: Co-educational
- Enrollment: 1,167 (2017-2018)
- Campus size: 63 acres (25 ha)
- Colors: Cardinal, black, white
- Athletics conference: West Catholic Athletic League; West Bay Athletic League; Peninsula Athletic League
- Mascot: Gators
- Accreditations: California Association of Independent Schools; Western Association of Schools and Colleges; Western Catholic Educational Association
- Website: shschools.org

Sacred Heart Schools, Atherton (commonly referred to as SHS, Sacred Heart, The Prep, or Sacred Heart, Atherton) is a private, Roman Catholic, co-educational school in Atherton, California, United States. It was established in 1898 by the Society of the Sacred Heart and is governed by an independent board of trustees.

It is composed of a preschool and kindergarten; a lower school for grades 1 through 5; a middle school for grades 6 through 8; and a college-preparatory school for grades 9 through 12. It has been open to both Catholic and non-Catholic students since its inception. Niche ranked it for 2020 as the best Catholic, PK-12, co-educational school in the United States.

== History ==
The Society of the Sacred Heart established girls' schools on six continents, reaching San Francisco in 1887 in the form of the Academy of the Sacred Heart. The Reverend Superior of that school, Mother O'Meara, anticipated a need for a boarding school on the peninsula to the south, leading to the establishment of what would become Sacred Heart Schools, Atherton. The initial plot of 40 acres (16 ha) was purchased by the Society in 1894 for $20,000 from San Francisco Archbishop Riordan, who had himself purchased orchard land from the Faxon Dean Atherton estate. Construction began in February 1897 for the initial wing of a planned two-story, quadrangular structure, with the cornerstone of the first wing laid on May 31, 1897.

=== Establishment: 1898–1944 ===
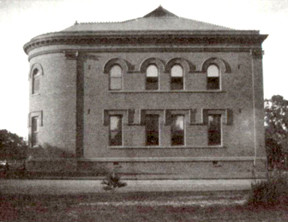
The main building, before the 1906 earthquake

In 1898, construction of the first wing was completed and Academy of the Sacred Heart of Menlo Park (Note: Atherton was carved out of Menlo Park through a separate incorporation in 1923, although Sacred Heart retained a Menlo Park mailing address until 1989. While "Academy of the Sacred Heart of Menlo Park" was the description used in its Articles of Incorporation, until the mid-1970s the school was also variously referred to in the press as "Sacred Heart Academy," "Sacred Heart Convent," "Convent of the Sacred Heart," and "Sacred Heart Menlo.") opened its doors to 23 girls and young women. A co-educational elementary day school was added in 1906. It was known as St. Joseph's (Note: The co-ed elementary school was established in conjunction with two donations of land – 5 acres (2.0 ha) in 1904 and an additional 16 acres (6.5 ha) in 1913 – by Emilie Donohoe in memory of her late husband, Joseph.) until 2010 when it was renamed the lower school.

Materials were being gathered for the construction of a second building when the 1906 San Francisco earthquake struck, causing considerable damage. Sister Emily Healy recounted that "by six the (attic) floor gave way under the fallen chimney, (and) the arcade with its massive columns had been wrenched out of place and thrown against the children's refectory and the assembly room, breaking windows in its fall." Sacred Heart students took refuge at St. Joseph's and within two months a $90,000 reconstruction and renovation project was underway, adding a third story, a new chapel, new classrooms and dormitories, parlors, a large porte-cochère, and a bell tower. In 1913, construction commenced on a second structure, "a three-story building adjoining the main buildings which (increased) the capacity threefold."

The school's senior class of 1899 consisted of just one student. In 1944, 13 seniors graduated.

=== Expansion: 1945–1983 ===
The period after World War II saw steady growth in Sacred Heart's physical plant, much of it on behalf of the lower and middle school grades. New facilities included a swimming pool in 1954; tennis courts in 1956; a rebuilt St. Joseph's school in 1956; a separate girls' elementary school in 1958; the Sigall middle school building in 1961; a multipurpose building for St. Joseph's in 1965; and, a science building for St. Joseph's in 1966. In 1969, the co-educational St. Joseph's and all-girls Sacred Heart elementary merged, retaining the St. Joseph's name. Consistent with the post-war childbirth surge, the number of graduating seniors grew to 55 by 1966 and 60 by 1984. But the number of boarding students had been declining, and dwindling numbers of Society of the Sacred Heart sisters led to a mostly lay teaching staff by the 1970s and the first lay Head of School, Milton Warner, in 1995.

=== Transition: 1984–1997 ===
1984 marked the transformation of Sacred Heart's upper school from a finishing school for girls (Note: In 1971, the San Francisco Archdiocese described Sacred Heart as "a private finishing school... where the very rich send their daughters.") into a co-educational prep school. The boarding program ended, and that fall 30 boys entered a re-branded Sacred Heart Preparatory.

In 1989, the Loma Prieta earthquake caused cosmetic damage to the main building and prompted the school to move its remaining functions elsewhere on campus. In 1996, "after several years of grappling with whether to tear down the building and build a modern one in its place, or try to save it," Sacred Heart's board of trustees voted to approve a $4.5 million renovation. The renovation was completed in October 1997. That June, 78 seniors graduated.

=== Renovation and expansion: 1998–present ===
A 1997 capital campaign fueled construction over the next ten years: renovation of the 'West Wing' of the main building to hold a library on two of its floors in 2000; a performing arts center, including a 350-seat theatre in 2004; an Olympic-size swimming pool; (Note: The first pool of this size in San Mateo County.) and the Homer Science Center in 2008, including a 700-seat auditorium. A third capital campaign was initiated in 2008 to pay for various improvements, ultimately raising $101 million. Subsequent building projects included a new lower and middle school complex in 2012, and a new prep school facility in 2019. The St. Joseph's name was dropped in 2010 with all grades presenting themselves as divisions within Sacred Heart Schools, Atherton.

The 2020 graduating class comprised 155 seniors.

== Structure ==
Sacred Heart Schools, Atherton, consists of four divisions: a preschool and kindergarten; a lower school for grades 1 – 5; a middle school for grades 6 – 8; and a college preparatory school for grades 9 – 12. The combined school is overseen by a director and supported by centralized administrative functions.

Sacred Heart Preparatory (commonly called Sacred Heart Prep, SHP, or Prep) was an all-girls school with a significant boarding component until 1984, when it adopted the Preparatory name, ended the boarding program, and started admitting boys. For the 2017 – 2018 school year, SHP had an enrollment of 629 students, half of whom were male, 58% Catholic, and 37% students of color.

The elementary school and middle school are collectively known as the Lower and Middle School (more commonly, LMS). The LMS is the result of the 1969 merger of the all-girls Sacred Heart elementary and middle school and the co-ed St. Joseph's elementary. As of the 2017 – 2018 school year, the lower school and middle school had respective enrollments of 323 and 215 students. The preschool and kindergarten, which operates as a separate division, had an enrollment of 107.

Sacred Heart Prep and the LMS hold daytime activities in separate complexes on the SHS campus and have separate principals. While LMS students wear school uniforms, SHP students do not.

=== Governance ===
Sacred Heart is an independent (Note: Sacred Heart is accredited by the California Association of Independent Schools, which is an approved accreditor for the National Association of Independent Schools (NAIS) and adheres to its independence criteria.) non-profit school that is controlled by an independent board of trustees, most of whom are lay people. (Note: In 2018, two trustees were RSCJ sisters, out of 29 trustees in total.) The school remains a mission of the Society of the Sacred Heart which commits members to educate toward its goals. Sacred Heart's independence contrasts with most Catholic schools in the U.S. which are owned or operated by a parish, diocese, or archdiocese (see Catholic school operations).

=== Admissions ===
Sacred Heart's natural admissions points are at the beginning of high school, when the grade expands by about 90 students; at the beginning of middle school, when the grade expands by about 30 students; and at preschool and kindergarten. The school requires applicants to provide, among other things, scores from standardized tests: Independent School Entrance Examination (ISEE) for middle school and High School Placement Test (HSPT) for the Prep.

== Curriculum ==
To graduate, students must complete four years of English; four years of religious studies; three years of social science; three years of mathematics (or through algebra 2); two years of French, Latin, Mandarin, or Spanish (or through level 3); two years of science; one-and-a-half years of fine arts; one semester of computer science; and, one semester of health & wellness. The school offers 20 honors sections and 28 AP courses. 89% of SHP's 83 faculty hold master's or doctoral degrees. Supplementing the college preparatory core are some notable electives, including a sustainable agriculture course where students cultivate vegetables and butcher a goat.

Religious studies, which the school describes as "ecumenical and interfaith in content and perspective," is a core subject from grades 6 – 12. Students and their families have the option to participate in Catholic or non-Catholic rites, traditions, and practices, including Eucharistic liturgies, confirmation, meditations, and Wednesday morning prayers in the chapel. Community service overlaps religious studies, including a requirement to complete at least 25 hours of community service in grade 10 and a capstone service project in grade 12.

== Extracurricular activities ==
=== Athletics ===
The school's mascot is the Gators. For baseball and football, Sacred Heart competes in the Bay division of the Peninsula Athletic League (PAL); for water polo and boys' lacrosse, the West Catholic Athletic League (WCAL); and, for all other sports, the West Bay Athletic League (WBAL). All three leagues are in the CIF Central Coast Section (CCS) of California's NorCal region. (Note: Approximately 1400 high schools in California participate in competitive sports, and they ascend through the following hierarchy: league, section, region, state. Leagues are sometimes further divided.)

==== Boys' sports ====
The school fields boys' sports teams in baseball, basketball, cross-country, football, golf, lacrosse, soccer, swimming & diving, tennis, track & field, and water polo.

SHP Boys CCS Championships

Baseball	2015
Basketball	1995, 2006, 2008, 2010, 2011, 2012, 2014, 2021
Cross country	2006
Football	2010, 2012, 2013^{r}, 2014, 2015^{r}, 2021^{s}
Lacrosse	2021, 2025
Soccer	1988, 1991, 2000, 2001, 2002, 2004, 2006, 2013, 2021, 2022
Tennis	2005, 2006^{r}, 2008^{r}
Water polo	2003, 2007, 2008, 2009, 2011, 2012, 2013, 2014, 2015, 2016, 2017, 2018, 2019, 2021^{r}

r = regional championship	s = state championship

==== Girls' sports ====
The school fields girls' sports teams in basketball, cross-country, golf, flag football, lacrosse, soccer, swimming & diving, tennis, track & field, volleyball, and water polo. In 1994, Sacred Heart became the smallest school to win a California division I girls' basketball championship.

SHP Girls CCS Championships

Basketball	1988, 1989, 1992, 1993^{r,s}, 1994^{r,s}, 1995^{r,s}, 1996^{r,s}, 1997, 1999^{r,s}, 2000, 2001, 2002, 2016, 2018
Cross country	2000
Soccer	2009, 2014, 2015, 2019, 2020
Swimming & Diving	2021
Volleyball	1988, 1990, 1991^{r}, 1992^{r}, 1993^{r}, 1994, 1995^{r,s}, 1996^{r,s}, 1997, 1998^{r}, 2009, 2010^{r}, 2012^{r}, 2017^{r} (Note: In 2017, Sacred Heart won the NorCal regional championship but did not win the CCS championship.), 2018, 2019
Water polo	2007, 2008, 2009, 2011, 2012, 2013, 2014, 2015, 2016, 2019

r = regional championship	s = state championship

=== Performing arts ===
The school's musical theatre group was nominated for the 2019 Rita Moreno California Music Award, and its Pulse Dance Team won the Hayward, California regional of the 2019 Rainbow National Dance Competition.

=== Traditions ===
==== Valpo Bowl ====
The Valpo Bowl is an annual football game between Sacred Heart and the neighboring Menlo School that raises money for a local educational charity. The first game was held in 2003, three years after Sacred Heart started its boys football program. The Valpo Bowl name stems from both schools having a main entrance on Valparaiso Avenue, although the contest itself is usually held at a neutral venue.

The school has won the following years: 2005, 2008, 2010, 2012, 2013, 2014, 2015, 2017, 2018, 2019, 2022, and 2023.

==== Religious traditions ====
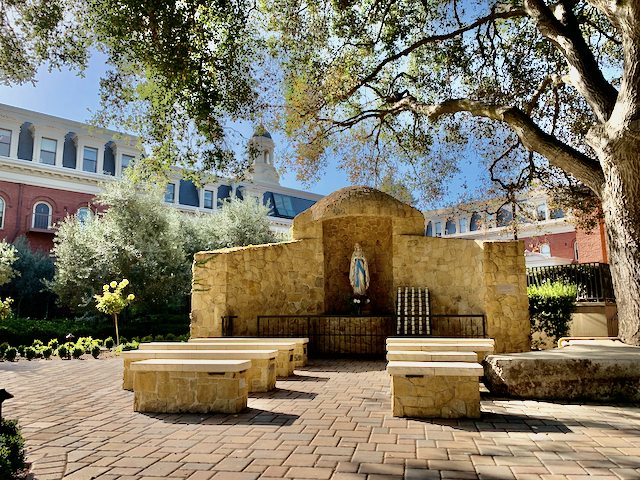
Lourdes grotto with Main Building in background

Sacred Heart dismisses students the week before Easter (Holy Week) for spring break. Observed feast days are Mater Admirabilis (October 20); St. Madeleine Sophie Barat (May 25); and St. Rose Philippine Duchesne (November 28). On May 1, LMS students adorn the statue of Our Lady of Lourdes in a May Crowning ceremony.

==== Network-wide traditions ====
Sacred Heart Schools, Atherton inherits some active traditions from the Society of the Sacred Heart. Many are French, given the origins of the Society, including Congé (an on-campus day where classes have been unexpectedly cancelled); Goûter (an occasional snack distributed by RSCJ); and, Coeur de Jésus, Sauvez le Monde (the school song).

== Campus ==
Sacred Heart sits on a rectangular, 63-acre (25 ha) campus that stretches along Valparaiso Avenue, about one mile northwest of Stanford University. Taking Valparaiso as the lower boundary, the campus is laid out with the Oakwood retirement community in the center; the preparatory complex in the lower left quadrant; the lower and middle school complex in the upper right quadrant; and athletic facilities in the upper left and lower right quadrants. A small animal farm is just above Oakwood.

=== Preparatory complex ===
Main Building (1898) – Repaired and restored after the 1906 and 1989 earthquakes, the Main Building houses school-wide administrative offices, classrooms, meeting and reception rooms, a chapel, and two libraries. At the time of its construction, the design was described as "in the Italian Romanesque style, the foundations of concrete, the superstructure of red stock brick, with stone and terra-cotta trimmings and a slate roof." After its 1913 reconstruction, it affected "a monumental French Second Empire design." Combined with the adjoining, 350-seat Performing Arts Center, it forms an open courtyard that partially encloses a labyrinth and grotto.

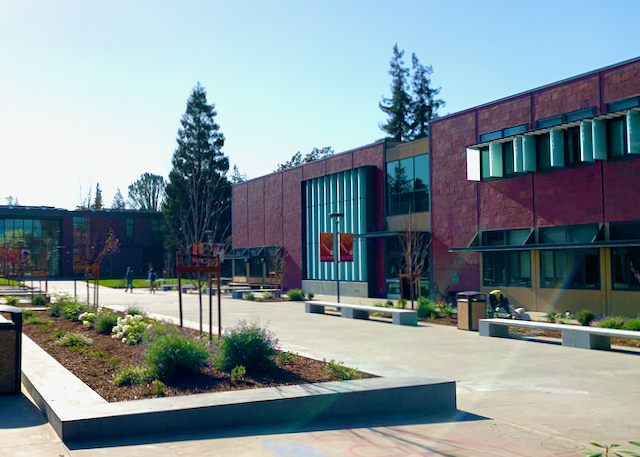
Homer Science Center (right); Campbell Academic & Arts Center (background)

William V. Campbell Academic Arts Building (2019) – The 79,000 sq ft (7,300 m^{2}) building houses flex classrooms and meeting rooms; a performing arts wing; an innovation lab; visual arts studios; a TV and radio station; administrative offices; and an outdoor amphitheater. It is named after Bill Campbell, a Silicon Valley business executive, college football coach, and Sacred Heart benefactor.

Homer Science Center (2009) – The 44,000 sq ft (4,100 m^{2}) building houses science classrooms, a cafeteria, and a 700-seat auditorium. In 2010, it became the first school building in Silicon Valley to achieve a Platinum LEED rating and received a Top 10 Green Project award by the American Institute of Architects' Committee on the Environment (AIA/COTE). It is named after Michael Homer, a computer industry executive.

=== LMS complex ===
The lower and middle school complex consists of the Bergeron lower school building, (Note: The Bergeron building is named after Doug Bergeron, the founder of an investment company.) Xie middle school building, Murphy Administration building, Johnson Performing Arts Center with Ravi Assembly Hall, and Stevens library.

Stevens Library (2012) has a Platinum LEED rating and was the first school building in California to receive a Net Zero Energy Building Certification from the International Living Future Institute. "All of the library’s systems, including lighting, heating and water use require no net input from outside sources."

=== Athletic facilities ===
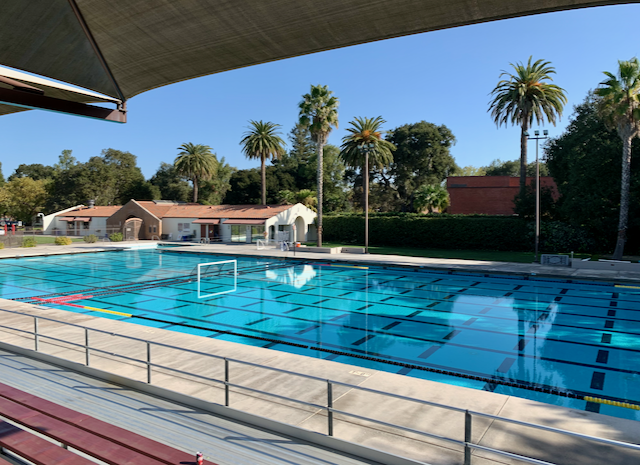
Dunlevie Aquatic Center

The campus has seven tennis courts, three gymnasiums, two baseball fields, a football and track stadium, a soccer field, a lacrosse field, and an Olympic-size swimming pool.

=== Gardens and farm ===
The campus supports cultivation of both plants and animals. The animal farm raises goats, rabbits, ducks, and chickens for the production of cheese, eggs, meat and milk, while 10,000 sq ft (900 m^{2}) of organic gardens provide vegetables and herbs to Sacred Heart cafeterias, local charities, and an on-campus farmer's market. (Note: Sacred Heart is the first school to receive approval from the San Mateo County Department of Environmental Health Services to consume and sell produce in this manner.) Lower school students harvest up to 2,000 lb (910 kg) of Picholine olives from 50 heritage olive trees that lie along the campus's western, Elena Avenue border, which are then pressed off-campus into oil.

=== Oakwood retirement community ===
Oakwood is the largest of two RSCJ retirement communities in the United States, with 52 RSCJ. The first building was opened in 1971, with other structures following in 1981, 1992, 1996, and 2003. The Gatehouse, a related but separate community, opened in 1987 and was rebuilt in 2011.

RSCJ are active on campus in tutoring, lecturing, advising, and leading prayers. Most are paired with seniors in the prep school through the Sacred Heart Society club.

== Directors ==
- Nancy Morris (1971–1989)
- Margaret (Peggy) Brown (1989–1995)
- Milton (Milt) Werner (1995–1998)
- Joan McKenna (1998–2000)
- Joseph Ciancaglini (2000–2007)
- Richard (Rich) Dioli (2007–present)

== Notable alumni ==
- Olivia Athens, professional soccer player
- Cara Black, author
- Sally Brophy, Broadway and television actress, and college theatre arts professor
- Ben Burr-Kirven, NFL player
- Caroline "KK" Clark, water polo player
- Kelly Crowley, Paralympic swimmer and cyclist
- Abby Dahlkemper, soccer player
- Tierna Davidson, soccer player
- David Ellison, film producer
- Megan Ellison, film producer and entrepreneur
- Patty Hearst (middle school), author and actress
- Drue Kataoka, visual artist
- Leo Koloamatangi, NFL player
- Hope Portocarrero, First Lady of Nicaragua
- Melissa Pritchard, short story writer, novelist, essayist, and journalist
- Kameelah Janan Rasheed, artist and writer
- Lia Smith, diver and transgender advocate

== See also ==
- Schools of the Sacred Heart
