= Sacred Heart School of Halifax =

Coordinates: 44°38′27.8″N 63°34′57.4″W

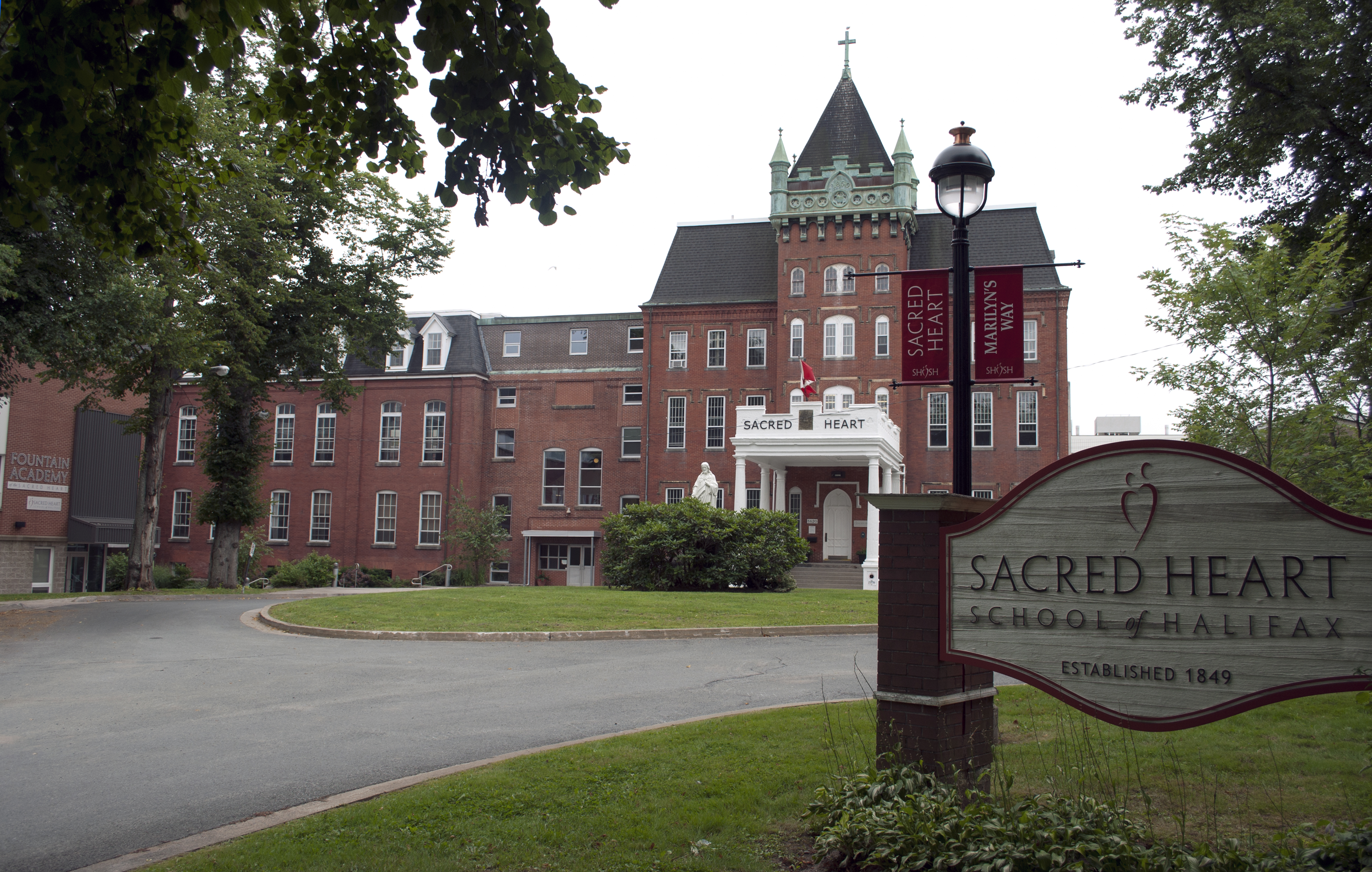

Location
- 5820 Spring Garden Road; Halifax, Nova Scotia, B3H 1X8; Canada

Information
- Type: Independent, Day School
- Motto: Verax tum audax (Latin) (Dare to be true)
- Religious affiliations: Roman Catholic (Society of the Sacred Heart)
- Founded: 1849; 177 years ago
- Head of School: Robert Marchand
- Grades: Jr. Primary–12
- Gender: Coeducational
- Enrolment: 504 (2015-16)
- Athletics conference: Nova Scotia School Athletic Federation
- Mascot: Shark
- Accreditation: Canadian Accredited Independent Schools
- Website: www.shsh.ca

Sacred Heart School of Halifax is Catholic school in Halifax, Nova Scotia. The school offers co-ed education for JP-Grade 6 and grades 10-12, with single-gender education for grades 7-9. Sacred Heart School of Halifax is part of a global network of Sacred Heart schools around the world. Founded in 1849, Sacred Heart School of Halifax is the oldest continually operating school in Halifax.

== History ==
Sacred Heart Convent was founded in 1849 by the Society of the Sacred Heart. It was originally one of two convent schools in the city and educated the daughters of the elite for many years.

== Courses ==
Sacred Heart School of Halifax offers the Advanced Placement (AP) program and a University Prep program.

== See also ==
- Network of Sacred Heart Schools
