= Theophile Papin =

American real estate agent (1857–1916)

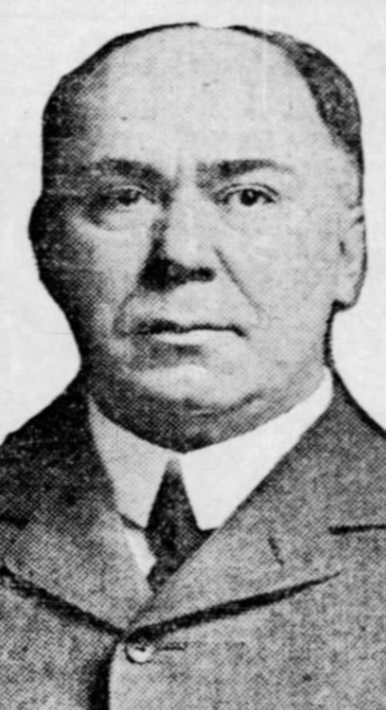
- Born: April 23, 1857; St. Louis, Missouri
- Died: March 3, 1916 (aged 58); St. Louis, Missouri
- Education: Saint Louis University; Washington University
- Occupation: Real estate agent

Theophile "Toto" Papin Jr. (1857–1916) was a St. Louis, Missouri, real estate man known as the "squire of debutantes" because of the large number of young women who made their bow into society under his auspices.

== Biography ==
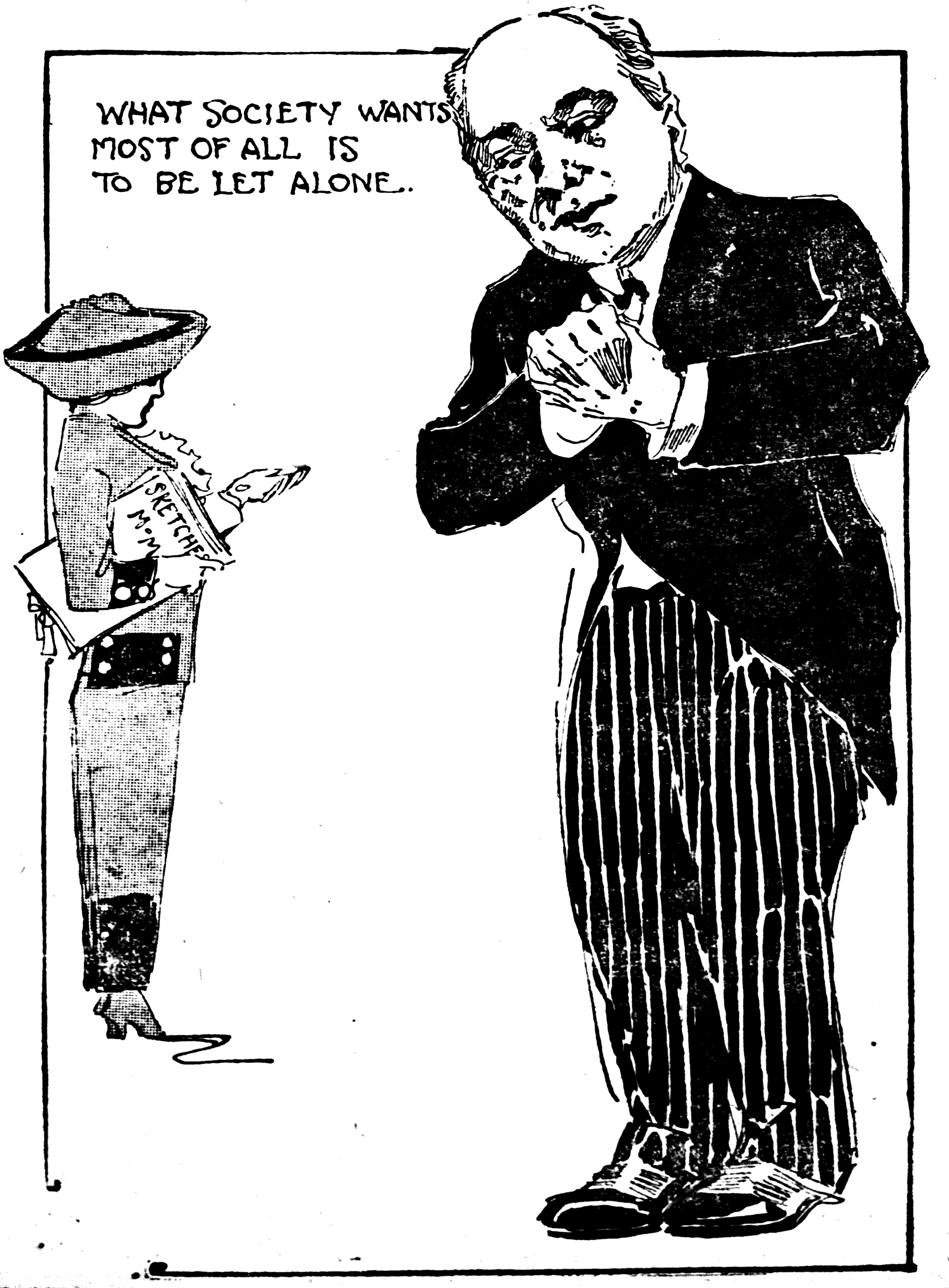
Papin is interviewed by reporter-artist Marguerite Martyn in this sketch which Martyn drew; published in the St. Louis Post-Dispatch on December 18, 1910.

Papin was born in St. Louis on April 23, 1857, the son of Theophile Papin (c. 1827 – 1902) of St. Louis and Julia Henry of Illinois. He had a brother, Edward V., and two sisters, Julia and Mrs. Gerald M. Borden.

Papin went to school in France and then attended Saint Louis University and Washington University in St. Louis. He also studied in Marburg and Cassel, Germany.

Papin was noted in St. Louis Roman Catholic circles because of his friendship with high dignitaries of the church and that he had been granted private audiences by Popes Leo XIII and Pius X.

He went to Vatican City in 1912 to deliver to Pope Pius the testimony taken in connection with the canonization of Rose Philippine Duchesne of the Sacred Heart Convent in St. Charles, Missouri. He booked a ticket on the RMS Titanic for his return trip, but canceled at the last moment, thus avoiding the sinking of the liner when it struck an iceberg.

The St. Louis Post-Dispatch said of him: "Papin was regarded as one of the best-educated men in St. Louis. He was a linguist, a lover of rare books and a collector of valuable paintings.

He was also known for being recruited by society women to take care of the myriad details of their daughters' "coming out" as debutantes during St. Louis's social season.

Theophile Papin died at his home in St. Louis on March 3, 1916.
