= The Regis School of the Sacred Heart =

Location
- Houston, Texas; United States; 29°47′42″N 95°28′35″W

Information
- Type: Independent
- Motto: Scholars and Gentlemen in the Sacred Heart Tradition
- Religious affiliation: Roman Catholic
- Patron saint: Saint John Francis Regis
- Established: 1990
- Sister school: Duchesne Academy of the Sacred Heart
- Dean: Paul McStravick
- Head of School: Steven R. Turner, Jr.
- Faculty: 41
- Grades: PK–8
- Gender: Boys
- Enrollment: 277 (2022)
- Average class size: 13
- Student to teacher ratio: 8:1
- Campus type: Suburban
- Colors: gray, Red, and Navy
- Athletics: Lower School: Soccer, Basketball, and Baseball; Middle School: Cross Country, Soccer, Basketball, Rugby, Track, Swimming, Golf, and Tennis.
- Mascot: The Knight
- Tuition: $25,950
- Website: www.theregisschool.org
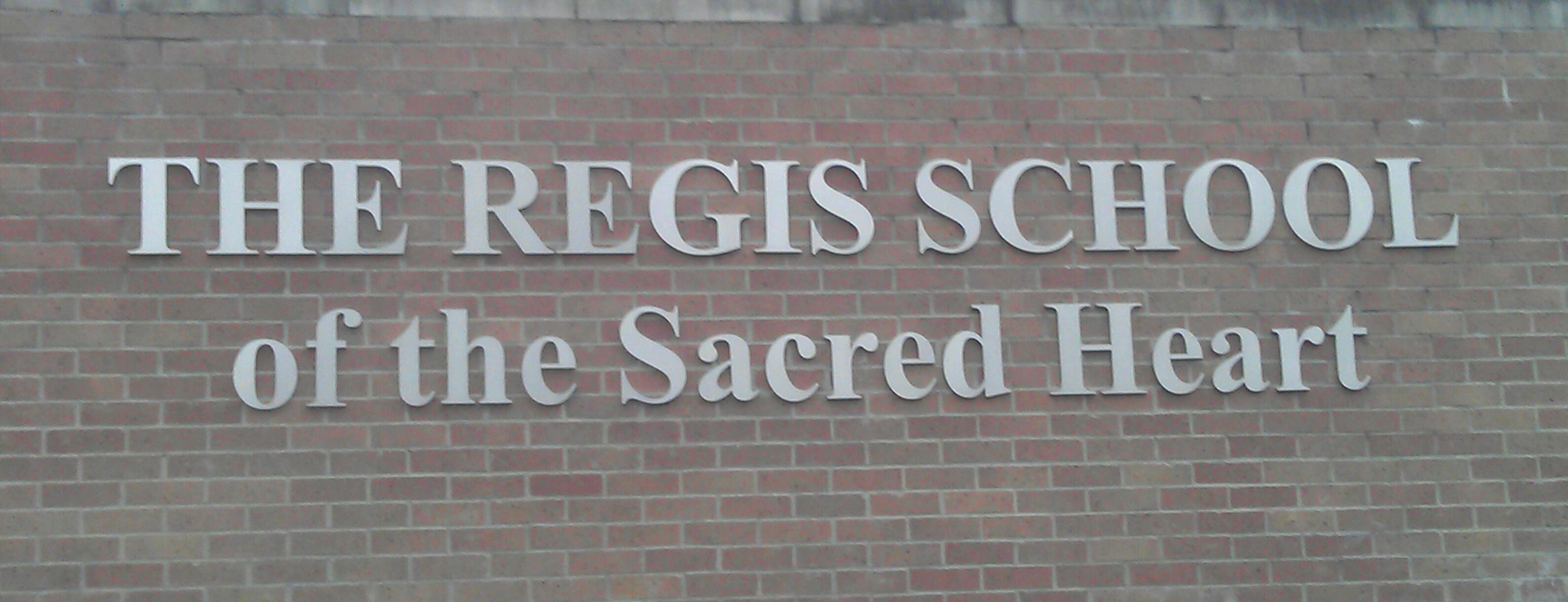
- The front sign at The Regis School

The Regis School of the Sacred Heart is an elementary and middle school for boys. It is located at 7330 Westview Drive in the Spring Branch area of Houston, in the U.S. state of Texas. The boys school serves students in pre-kindergarten through eighth grade. The school has been single gender and non-profit since its founding and is a Houston Area Independent School. Regis is also part of the Roman Catholic Archdiocese of Galveston-Houston. As at 2022, the school has about 277 students enrolled, and it celebrated its thirtieth anniversary during the 2021–22 school year. Regis, an independent Catholic school, is the only all-boys school of the Archdiocese to have early childhood, elementary, and middle school programs in one school. Regis is the brother school of the Duchesne Academy of the Sacred Heart.

== History ==
The school is located here. In 1990, a group of Duchesne families founded The Regis School with the goal of being accepted into the Network of Sacred Heart Schools. The school was scheduled to open in August 1991. In August, 1991, the school opened with 38 students in facilities leased from Holy Cross Lutheran Church. Since these temporary facilities were inadequate, a search was started for a more permanent solution. The Milestones and Administration building was purchased and renovated, and classes began there in August 1992. The school was searching for a permanent site within 2 miles (3.2 km) of Duchesne.

Between the school's first year of operation and its second year of operation, the student body increased by 83%. In January 1993 the school had 60 students in grades preschool through six. It planned to expand to the eighth grade and increase its student body to 320. Ninfa Laurenzo, the founder of the Ninfa's restaurant chain and a grandmother of a student at Regis, was honored at the annual "The Regis Merci" celebration on Wednesday April 13, 1994. The celebration honors individuals who were instrumental to the school's operations. Houston Mayor Bob Lanier declared that day "Ninfa Laurenzo Day" and presented this proclamation to her at the celebration.

In 1995, The Regis School earned accreditation from the Texas Catholic Conference Educational Department. In April of the same year, The Network of Sacred Heart Schools accepted The Regis School as a provisional member. Full membership was granted in 1998.

Over the years, growth of the school necessitated the installation of three temporary classroom buildings to house the upper grades. Through a capital campaign, the purchase of adjoining properties paved the way for expansion. In 2001, construction began on a new schooling building and several additional improvements, including a regulation sports field. In 2002, lower and middle school classes began the school year in the new building.

In 2005, Anne Storey Carty, the founding headmistress, announced that she would be retiring after the 2006 school year, the 15th anniversary of the school's founding. After a thorough search, Dr. Nancy Taylor was selected as the second headmistress of the school.

On November 8, 2007, Pulitzer Prize-winning humorist Dave Barry and New York Times bestseller Ridley Pearson visited the school in the afternoon.

In late 2010, construction began for a new student center with the demolition of the former pavilion. On November 22, 2011, Regis honored veterans at its annual Veteran's Day celebration, with the students displaying posters on the school gates. On January 30, 2012, the school held its first ever career day, where students had the opportunity to hear about a variety of jobs from professional workers. The school held its first large event in the new Student Life Center in a liturgy celebrating Grandparent's Day on October 19, 2012. Regis officially opened the Student Life Center for daily use on November 6, 2012, with its liturgy for the dedication of the new building.

=== Accreditation ===
Regis was the first school voted into membership in the National Network of Sacred Heart Schools in 1998. Through its reflective process concerning how its community lives the Goals and Criteria, Regis received its SHCOG renewal site visit in March 2009. Regis is also accredited by the Texas Catholic Conference Educational Department, under the auspices of the Texas Education Agency. The Independent Schools Association of the Southwest invited Regis to membership as its 86th accredited school in June 2010.

== Campus ==
The school is located on a 3-acre (1.2 ha) site that it purchased in May 1992. This site is in the Spring Branch district, in the immediate area of the Afton Village subdivision.

The Student Life Center, a 27,000-square-foot (2,500 m^{2}) multi-purpose building, opened in the autumn of 2012. It houses a gymnasium, weight room, indoor cafeteria, additional instructional classrooms, assembly area for drama and music productions, the Celebration of the Liturgy, and special events.

== Student life ==
=== Academics ===
The academics is based on the same core subjects throughout a student's tenure at Regis. This is more strongly influenced with specific educational programs that are used through textbooks. Specific programs provide a strong base of knowledge for Regis students. Many teachers also try to provide their own form of a structured and well-managed curriculum for their own subject. As of 1993 all students are required to take Catholic religion classes and attend Catholic religious services. Non-Catholic students take the classes as a form of academic education.

=== Athletics ===
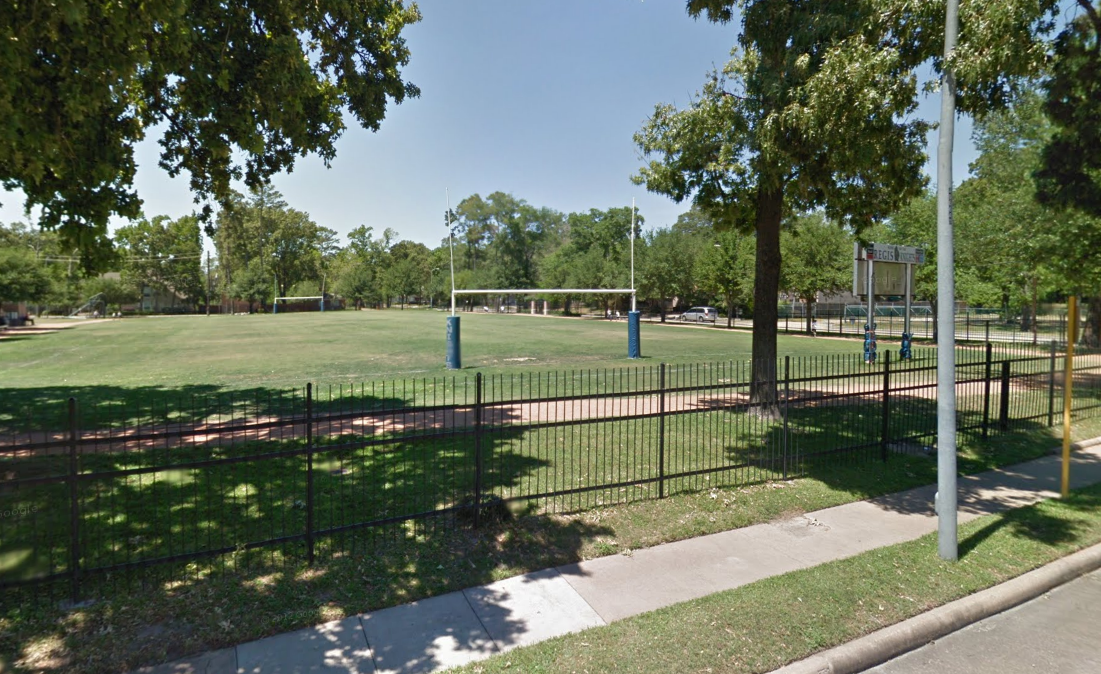
Photo of the athletics field at Regis.

Kindergarten and lower school athletics are organized and coached by parent volunteers. The boys play soccer in the fall, basketball in the winter, and baseball in the spring.

Through tryouts, boys may be selected to junior varsity and varsity teams. Middle school students also play soccer and basketball, but substitute rugby for baseball. Additional fees, for referees, uniforms, and league fees are required for each team a student joins. The Knights play in the Southwest conference of the Greater Houston Catholic Sports Association.

=== Service projects ===
The school uses several extracurricular projects, such as a "Big Brother, Little Brother" program and a "Social Justice" program. In 2008 Sacred Heart established a donation program for the Houston Food Bank. The school also participates in the Operation Rice Bowl campaign, where boys only eat a bowl of white rice for one day during Ash Wednesday. Every Christmas, Regis students also give out shoeboxes filled with toiletries to local charities.

== Tuition ==
In 1993, the annual tuition was $3,000 ($6686.25 when adjusted for inflation) for half day preschool, $4,800 ($10698 when adjusted for inflation) for students in grades Kindergarten through fourth, and $5,000 ($11143.75 when adjusted for inflation) for fifth graders. Because, unlike parochial schools, Regis is not directly associated with the archdiocese, the archdiocese does not give a subsidy to the school. Anne Storey Carty, the headmistress, said during that year that, as paraphrased by Richard Vara of the Houston Chronicle, "the education is not cheap".

== See also ==
- Duchesne Academy of the Sacred Heart - Sister school
- Christianity in Houston
