= Stuart Hall High School =

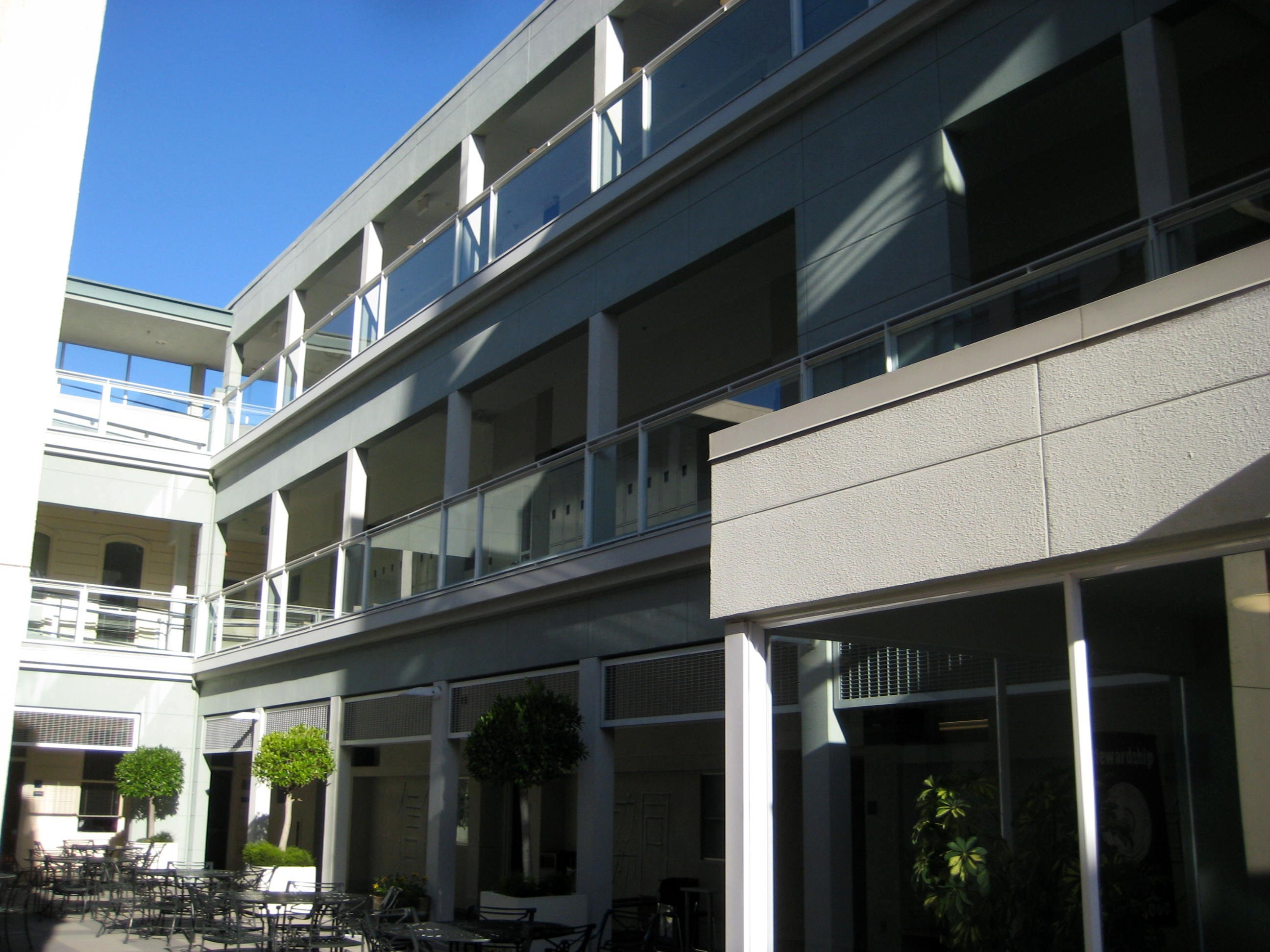
- The campus of the school

Location
- 1715 Octavia Street; San Francisco (Pacific Heights), California 94109; United States; 37.788623286963194°N 122.42725544794504°W

Information
- Type: Private
- Religious affiliations: Roman Catholic; Schools of the Sacred Heart
- Established: 2000
- President: Ann Marie Krejcarek
- Faculty: 23
- Grades: 9-12
- Gender: Boys
- Average class size: 14
- Student to teacher ratio: 7:1
- Colors: Red and Blue
- Song: Coeur de Jesus
- Athletics: Cross Country Running, Fencing, Soccer, Baseball, Track, Basketball, Swimming, Tennis, Golf, Badminton, Lacrosse, Football, Wrestling, Sailing
- Team name: The Knights
- Accreditation: Western Association of Schools and Colleges
- Newspaper: The roundtable
- Yearbook: Knight Vision (2016)
- Tuition: $39,240.00 (2015-16)
- Website: Stuart Hall High School

Stuart Hall High School is a Catholic all boys college-preparatory high school located in San Francisco, California. It opened in the fall of 2000 and together with the Convent of the Sacred Heart High School and Convent Elementary forms Convent & Stuart Hall, part of an international network of schools known as the Schools of the Sacred Heart.

== Academics ==
Stuart Hall High School operates by a block schedule; theology, ethics and social justice classes are mandatory for graduation. Heavy emphasis is placed on community involvement, service, critical thinking, respect for intellectual values, and self-development.

Each Stuart Hall High School student completes four years of English, history, mathematics, theology, and philosophy/religion; three years of lab science and international language; two years of physical education and fine arts; and one year of computer science.

As part of the Schools of the Sacred Heart network, SHHS has accepted the IB curriculum, and began it in the 2016-17 school year. Students also have a choice of AP courses, including art history, biology, calculus, chemistry, comparative government/politics, computer science, English language/composition, environmental science, European history, French language, French literature, human geography, music theory, physics, psychology, Spanish language, Spanish literature, studio art, US government/politics and US history. Students participate with Convent High School in many co-ed activities, including classes.

== Notable people ==
- Darren Criss, actor and musician. Most notable for starring in the Fox TV Show Glee

=== Staff ===
- Henry H. Neff, author of The Tapestry children's book series

== See also ==
- San Francisco County high schools
