= The Hound of Rowan =

- First edition
- Author: Henry H. Neff
- Cover artist: Cory Godbey
- Language: English
- Genre: Fantasy
- Published: 2007
- Publisher: Yearling
- Publication place: United States
- Media type: Print (audiobook, ebook, hardcover, paperback)
- Pages: 488
- ISBN: 978-0375838958

The Hound of Rowan (2007) is the first book of the Tapestry Series illustrated and written by American author Henry H. Neff, about a twelve-year-old boy named Max McDaniels who comes across a strange Celtic tapestry one day in a secret room in a museum. Max finds a letter in his coat pocket afterwards that leads him to Rowan Academy, a secret school where other gifted students like him go.

== Characters ==
- Max McDaniels is a twelve-year-old boy from Chicago who lives with his father, Scott McDaniels. His mother disappeared a few years prior to the beginning of the book.
- David Menlo is Max's roommate at Rowan and one of his close friends.
- Astaroth is a mythical demon and the main antagonist of the Tapestry series
- Nigel Bristow is the recruiter that tests Max prior to attending Rowan.
- Gabrielle Richter is the director of Rowan Academy.

== Chapters ==
- The Boy, The Train and the Tapestry
- Three Soft Knocks
- A Time to Choose
- The Flight to Rowan
- Evils Old and New
- The Last Lymrill
- A Full House
- The New and Weird
- A Golden Apple in the Orchard
- The Course
- All Hallow's Eve
- Secret Prisons
- Fibs and a Fiddle
- Meeting the Vyes
- Unexpected Guests
- Rowan's New Resident
- The Hound of Ulster
- Smugglers on the North Atlantic
- The Crypt of Marley Augur
- Father and Son

== Reception ==
The Hound Of Rowan was nominated for the Texas Bluebonnet Award. Awarded the Missouri Truman Award and Northern California Book of the year.
