= Sacred Heart Girls High School (Taiwan) =

The Sacred Heart Girls High School (Chinese: 新北市私立聖心女子高級中學) is a day and boarding school for girls ages 4–18 years located in the Bali District of New Taipei City, Taiwan. It was founded in 1960 and is a member of the Schools of the Sacred Heart network of private Catholic schools.

== See also ==
- Education in Taiwan
