= Henry H. Neff =

Author and illustrator

Henry H. Neff is the author and illustrator of the Tapestry, a fantasy fiction series that follows the life of a boy named Max McDaniels. His series comprises five novels, the last of which was published in e-book format on November 25, 2014, and is available as printed book since December 2021, after the publisher reverted the print rights back to Neff. The books are notable for combining a range of genres, including fantasy, history, mythology, folklore, and science fiction. Neff both writes and illustrates his books.

The Hound of Rowan was nominated for the 2009-10 Texas Bluebonnet Award.

Impyrium was named to the 2018 Texas Library Association Lone Star reading list

On August 18, 2014, it was announced that HarperCollins Children's Books had acquired his next project, Impyrium.

On April 16, 2021, Neff announced in his blog, that he finished working on a new book called The Witchstone, his first book for older teens and adults, and will now work on a new middle-grade book. The Witchstone will be released on June 18, 2024.

Before becoming an author, Henry H. Neff was a consultant for McKinsey & Company and a teacher at Stuart Hall High School in San Francisco. He is a graduate of New Trier High School in Winnetka, Illinois and Cornell University in Ithaca, New York. He lives and writes in Montclair, NJ.

== Bibliography ==
=== The Tapestry Series ===
1. The Hound of Rowan (2007)
2. The Second Siege (2008)
3. The Fiend and the Forge (2010)
4. The Maelstrom (2012)
5. The Red Winter (2014)

=== Standalones ===
- Impyrium (2016)
- The Witchstone (2024)
