= Sacred Heart Academy Bryn Mawr =

Private, all-girls school in Pennsylvania, United States

Location
- 480 S. Bryn Mawr Avenue; Bryn Mawr, Pennsylvania 19010-2101; United States; 40°0′50″N 75°20′43″W

Information
- Type: Private, All-Female
- Motto: Girls with Heart
- Religious affiliation: Roman Catholic SHA welcomes students of all faiths.
- Established: 1865
- Founder: Religious of the Sacred Heart
- Head of school: Mrs. Robin Nolan, Interim
- Grades: PreK-12
- Student to teacher ratio: 7:1
- Colors: Red and White
- Athletics: Yes
- Athletics conference: Athletics Association of Catholic Academies (AACA)
- Mascot: Lion
- Accreditation: Pennsylvania Association of Independent Schools
- Publication: Vue du Coeur
- Newspaper: The Beat
- Yearbook: The Gate
- School fees: varies by division: $275 - $880
- Tuition: varies by division: $5,500 - $26,200
- Affiliation: Network of Sacred Heart Schools
- Director of Enrollment Management: Mrs. Michele Jeffries
- Associate Head of School- Academics, Director of Upper School: Mrs. Eileen Day
- Assistant Head of School - Mission and Ministry, Director of Middle School: Mrs. Anna Mae Gill
- Assistant Head of School - Faculty, Director of DEIB, Director of Lower School: Mrs. Symone James Abiola
- Director of Athletics: Mr. Jason McGhee
- Director of Counseling: Mrs. Ashley Fullen
- Website: www.shabrynmawr.org

Sacred Heart Academy Bryn Mawr, commonly referred to as SHA or Sacred Heart, is a K-12 girls independent Catholic school with a NEW coed Preschool, located on the Main Line in Bryn Mawr, Pennsylvania. The school serves students PreK through grade 12 with an average enrollment of 300, and a student:teacher ratio of 6:1.

== History ==
Sacred Heart Academy Bryn Mawr was established in 1865 by the Religious of the Sacred Heart. It has been lay owned and operated since 1969. It joined the Network of Sacred Heart Schools in 1999, reuniting it with its roots.

== Athletics ==
Sacred Heart Academy's Upper School student-athletes participates in ten varsity sports, two club teams, and one intramural program. Varsity programs include: Basketball, Crew, Cross Country, Field Hockey, Golf, Lacrosse, Swimming, Tennis, Track & Field, and Volleyball.

Sacred Heart Academy's Middle School participates in Basketball, Cross Country, Field Hockey, Lacrosse, Softball, Soccer, Track & Field, and Volleyball.

Sacred Heart Academy's Lower School participates in Cross County and Track & Field.

== Scholarships ==
- Merit Scholarships: St. Madeleine Sophie Academic Scholarship and Spirit of Service Scholarship
- Honorary Scholarships: Class of 1964 Memorial Endowed Scholarship, Joan Craig Hadden '48 & Judith Brown '47 RSCJ Endowed Scholarship, Susanne Henkels ’45 and Walter F. Tucker Scholarship, Randy Rogers P'02, P'04 Memorial Endowed Scholarship, Patricia Ryan Scholarship, Elise Allan Tucci Scholarship

== Notable alumnae ==
- Mary T. Clark, American academic, civil rights advocate, and Augustine of Hippo expert.
- Elizabeth Plater-Zyberk, co-founder of the Congress for the New Urbanism and University of Miami architecture professor.
- Denise Nicole White, known professionally as AverySunshine is an American R&B singer, songwriter, and pianist. She won a Grammy in 2025 for Best Urban Contemporary Album.
