= Drue Kataoka =

Japanese-born American artist, writer, pundit

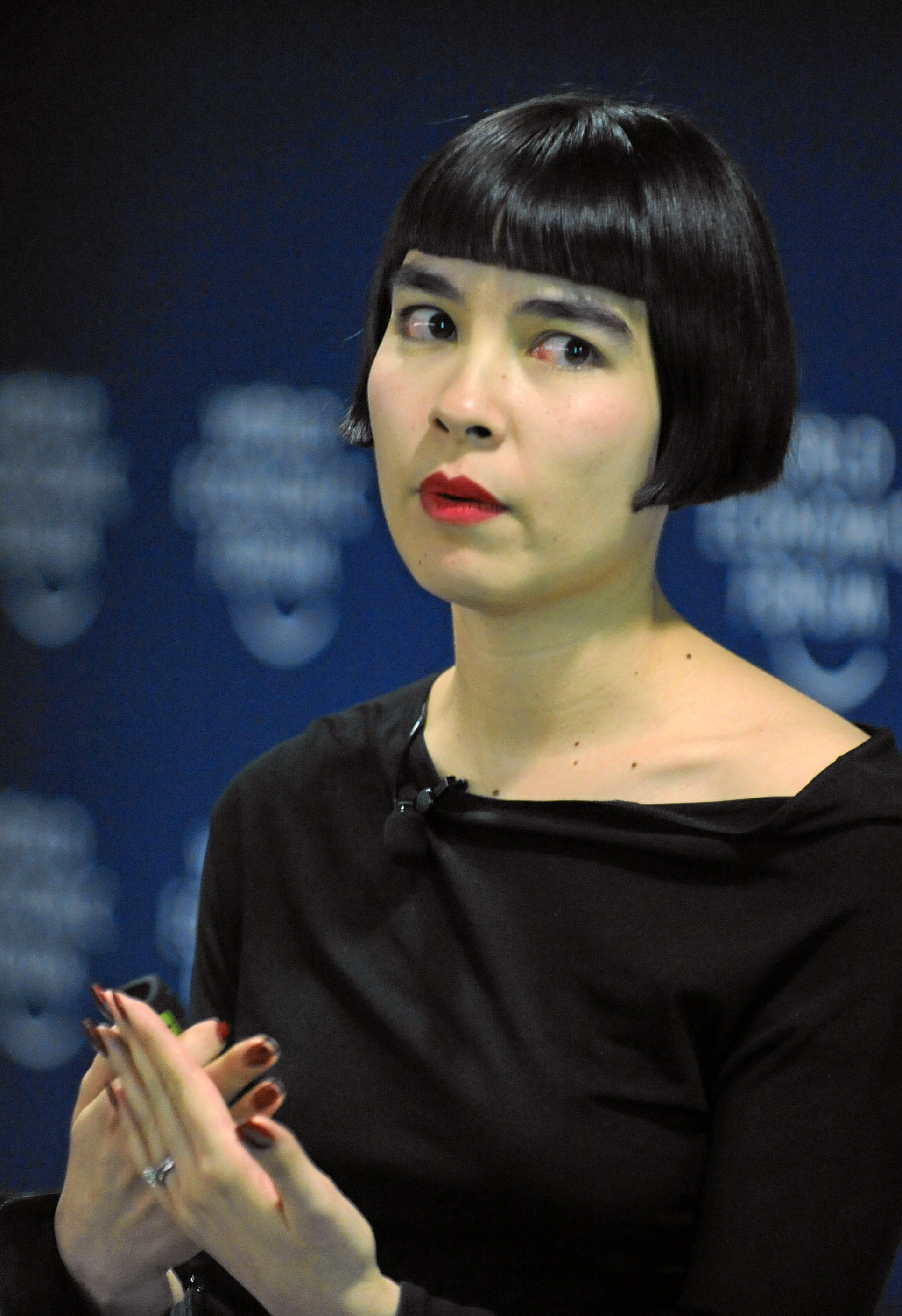
- Drue Kataoka (January 2011)
- Born: c. 1978 (age 47–48); Tokyo, Japan
- Education: Stanford University
- Known for: art, political commentary

Drue Kataoka (born c. 1978) is a Japanese American visual artist and political commentator. She is known for her Sumi-e art and interest in technology. In 2012, Kataoka was chosen as the Young Global Leader for the World Economic Forum summit at Davos. She is based in Silicon Valley, California.

== Early life and education ==
Kataoka was born c. 1978 in Tokyo, Japan and lived there until age 5. Her family moved to Washington D.C., then onto Seattle, and later to Menlo Park, California. Her father Tetsuya Kataoka is a political scientist, and research fellow at Hoover Institution, and her mother Barbara Kataoka (née Slavin) worked in the communications department at Stanford University. She attended high school at Sacred Heart Preparatory a private school in Atherton, California, and graduated from high school in 1996.

Kataoka attended college at Stanford University, where she majored in Art History and graduated in 2000. She participated in Stanford Jazz Band, where she played the flute. She began her art education in Sumi-e early in Japan and later in the US, earning her han (signature stamp) from sensei, M. Iseke. By age 19, she was considered a master of Sumi-e.

== Art career ==
Kataoka's art work spans various materials and practices including brainwave installations, sculptural works such as her "magic boxes" and "membranes," sumi-e brush work art, and paintings.

Kataoka's early works were in the canon of Sumi-e. However, early on she started experimenting with depicting modern subject matter such as sports, dance, jazz, public figures. Wynton Marsalis commissioned her to create a suite of album art for his Sony Columbia record, A Fiddler’s Tale. While at Stanford University, she completed 27 commemorative prints including the official print for the 100th anniversary of the Stanford University-California Big Game, the print for President Gerhard Casper's retirement gift, and the millennial portrait of Dr. Martin Luther King Jr. for The Martin Luther King Jr. Research and Education Institute at Stanford University.

Her commemorative prints are archived in the Department of Special Collections, Stanford University Libraries. Her painting of the Hoover carillon, I Ring for Peace, is permanently installed at the Hoover Institution.

In January 2013, Kataoka unveiled a brainwave-smart glass installation in Davos. She also created a conceptual piece up (2008) which incorporated Special Relativistic effects. Up was sent into space for the first Zero Gravity Art Exhibit at the International Space Station. She has developed techniques such as Magic Boxes and Shattered Mirrors to merge the art, its surroundings and the viewer in an artistic continuum.

Kataoka has written political commentary for CNBC in 2016.
