= AverySunshine =

American musician

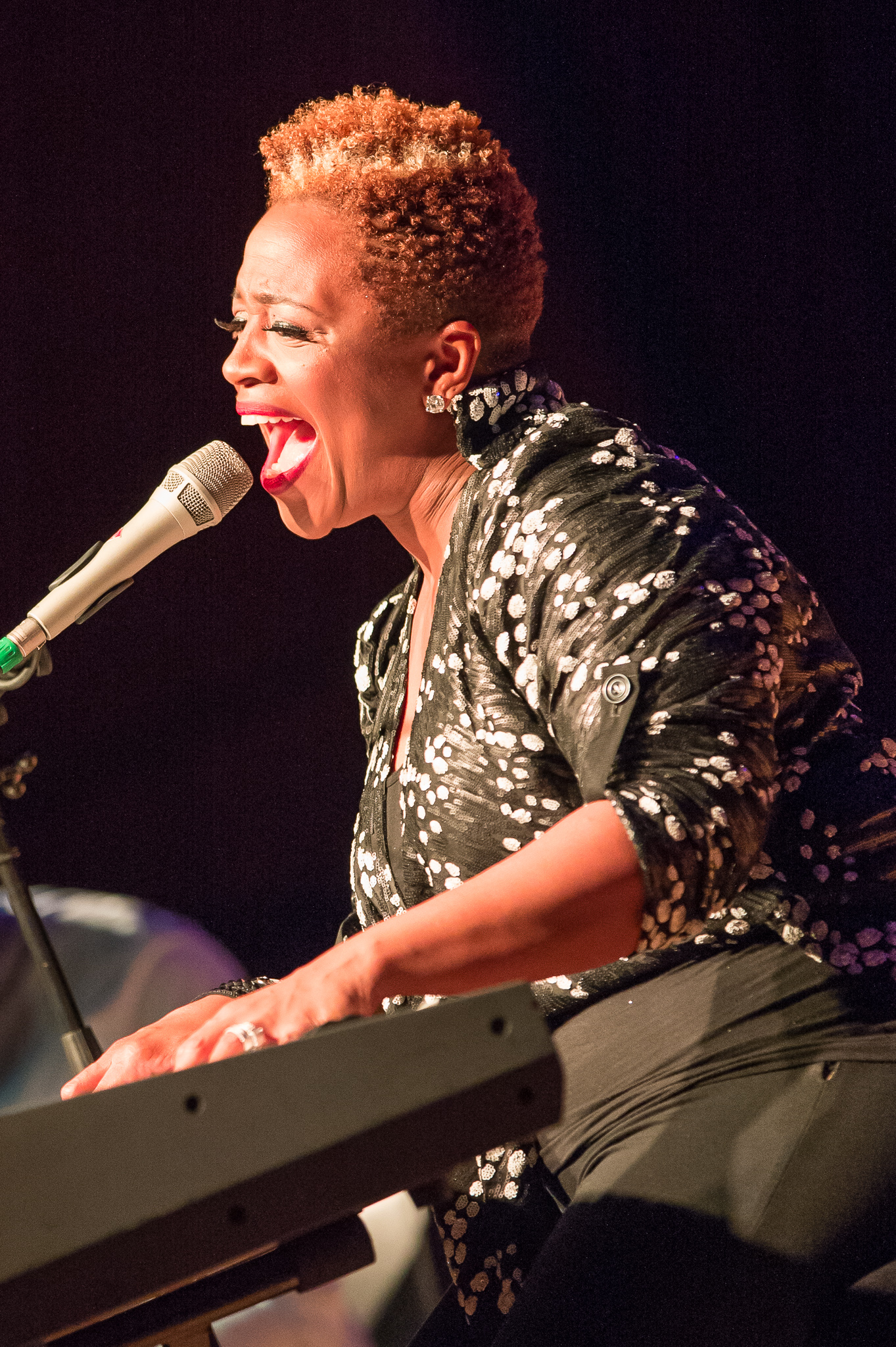
- AverySunshine in 2016

Background information
- Born: Denise Nicole White; May 22, 1975 (age 51); Chester, Pennsylvania, U.S.
- Genres: R&B, soul
- Occupations: Singer, songwriter
- Instruments: Piano, vocals
- Years active: 1993–present
- Labels: BigShine, Shanachie
- Website: averysunshine.com

Denise Nicole White (born May 22, 1975), known professionally as AverySunshine, is an American singer, songwriter and pianist.

== Early life and education ==
White was born in Chester, Pennsylvania, to Ruth Eleanor White and Irving Cyril White. She began playing piano at 8, after she saw a classmate perform, and learned to read hymns before beginning to study classical music at 11. At 13, she expanded her repertoire to include jazz and had her first recital. Three years later, her aunt, a church choir director, asked Sunshine to fill in for her during a Sunday service at a Catholic church; she was subsequently hired by churches of all denominations, including the AME Church, where she performed with the award-winning Wilmington/Chester Mass Choir.

White, who sang in her high school choir, graduated from the Country Day School of the Sacred Heart in Bryn Mawr, Pennsylvania, in 1993. She attended Spelman College in Atlanta, and although she enrolled as a piano major, she changed course after she became disillusioned with the music program. Sunshine graduated with a degree in philosophy in 1998.

== Career ==
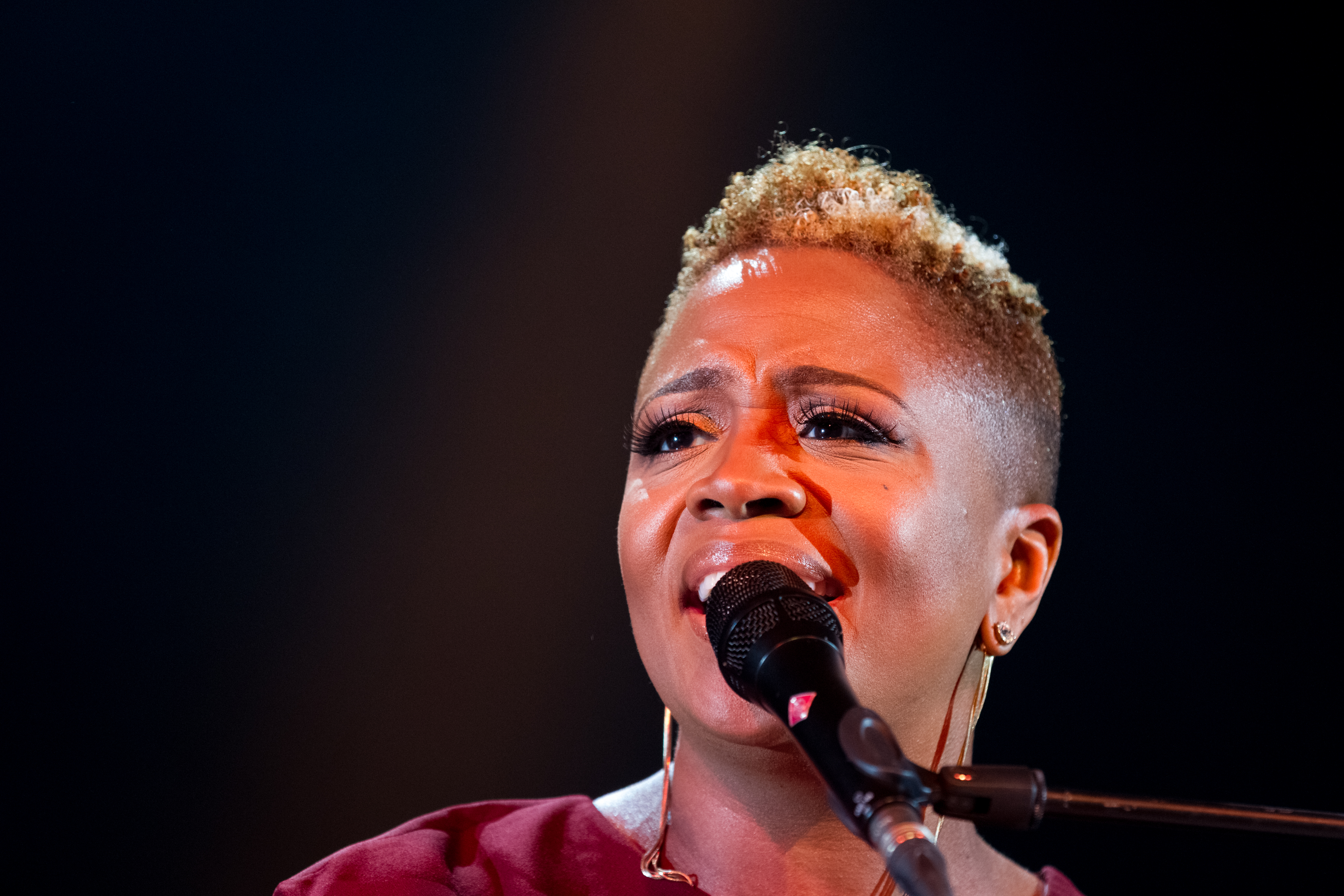
AverySunshine live at the "Leverkusener Jazztage" in Germany, 2015

In college, White met Maia Nkenge Wilson, a vocal major, and together they formed a gospel and R&B singing duo, DaisyRew. In addition to performing in Africa, DaisyRew performed at churches in the area and at clubs, including the Apache Café, which was noted for launching the careers of several prominent artists, including India.Arie. Wilson was cast in a Broadway role following college, and Sunshine was hired as the Minister of Music at the St. Paul AME Church in Atlanta. DaisyRew continued to perform when Wilson, on breaks from her theatrical career in New York, returned to Atlanta.

While working at the St. Paul AME Church, White met Dana Johnson, a guitarist, producer and songwriter who had previously worked with India.Arie. White, Johnson and Wilson began working together in 2003 with Johnson writing and producing the music, in addition to managing DaisyRew's career. Soon after, Wilson was again cast in a Broadway production and she left for New York. White then adopted the name AverySunshine. Her stage name is derived from the characters Shug Avery from The Color Purple and Sunshine from Harlem Nights.

In 2005, White and Johnson recorded "Stalker", a neo soul song, which a friend, Chris Brann, set to a house beat. The track became a dance hit on a Japanese record label, which led to a series of live dates in Japan.

White and Johnson began work on what became AverySunshine's self-titled first album, released in 2010 on their own label, BigShine. Recorded mainly at White's home with Pro Tools, the record included guest appearances by the pianist Takana Miyamoto, the vibraphone player Roy Ayers and Christian McBride. The record was praised by the media, with USA Today calling it "refreshingly original" and The Washington Post describing it as "a radiant brand of soul". White — a single mother of two – focused on AverySunshine, but also accepted jobs as a keyboard player with artists including Tyler Perry and Jennifer Holliday and worked as a choral director for Atlanta performances by artists such as Michael Bublé, Anthony Hamilton and David Foster. From 2010 until late 2013, AverySunshine toured consistently, and developed a following throughout the United States, the UK, Europe and Africa. They began recording a second album, The Sunroom, in November 2013, which was released in May 2014 through a partnership with Shanachie Records. In 2017, she released her third album, Twenty Sixty Four.

== Personal life ==
White lives in Atlanta, Georgia. Divorced in 2008, she is the mother of two children, a daughter, Drew, and a son, Evan. On April 3, 2016, White married her guitarist Dana Johnson.

== Awards ==
- iTunes Best of 2010
- Soultracks Reader's Choice Best New Artist
- Jet Top 5 Rising Indie Artists
- Creative Loafing Album of the Year Selection
- Grammy Award for Best Progressive R&B Album - So Glad to Know You

== Discography ==
=== Albums ===
- AverySunshine (2010, BigShine)
- The SunRoom (2014, BigShine, Shanachie)
- Twenty Sixty Four (2017, BigShine, Shanachie)
- Four Songs & a Bootleg (2022, BigShine)
- So Glad to Know You (2024, BigShine)

=== Singles ===
- "Stalker" (2005)
- "Ugly Part of Me" (2010)
- "Call My Name" (2014)
- "Sweet Afternoon" (2015)
- "Never Knew Christmas" (2015)
- "Come Do Nothing" (2016)
- "Heaven Is Right Here" (2017)
