= St. Thomas' Episcopal School =

Independent parochial school in Meyerland (Houston), Texas, United States

Saint Thomas' Episcopal School
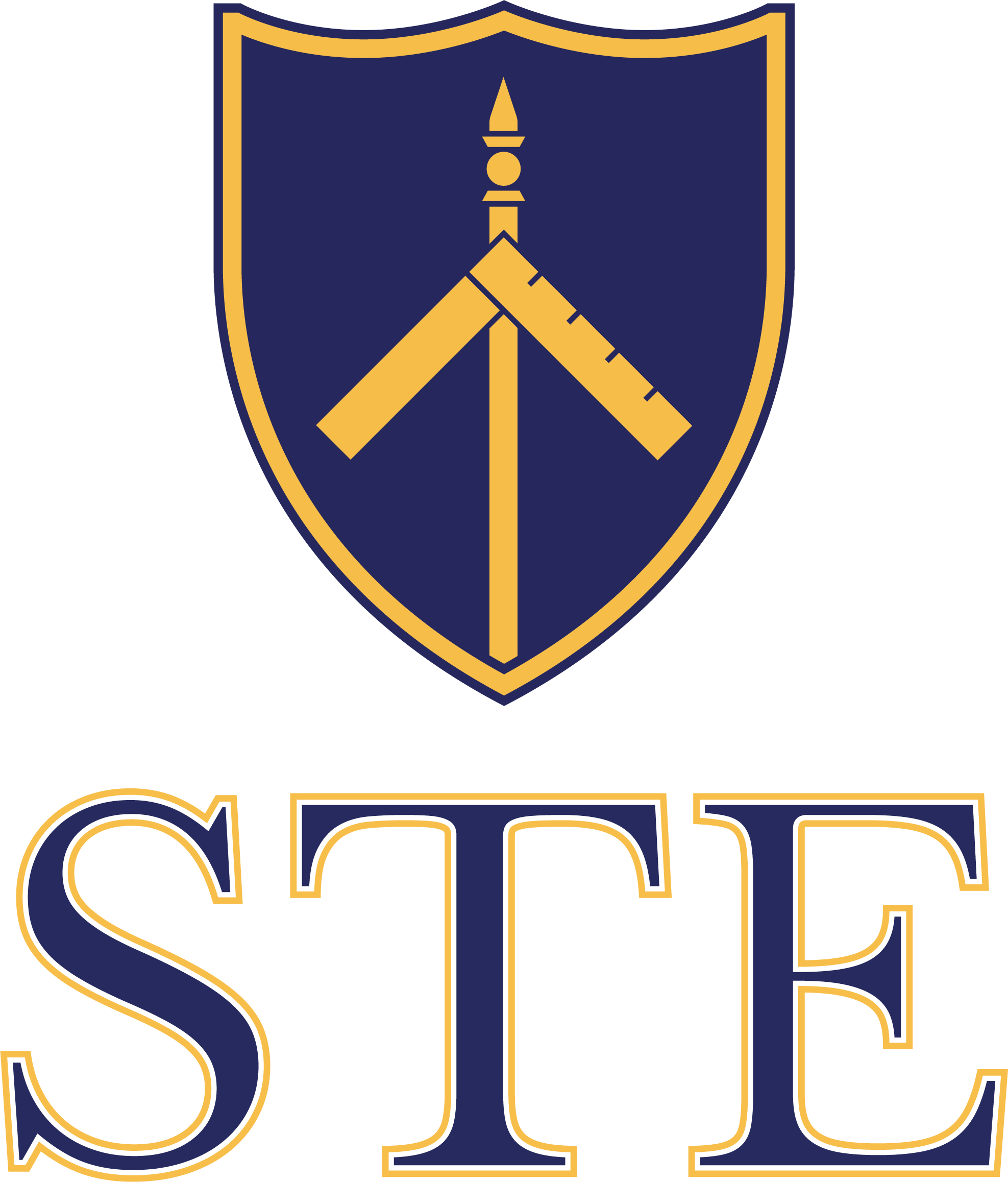

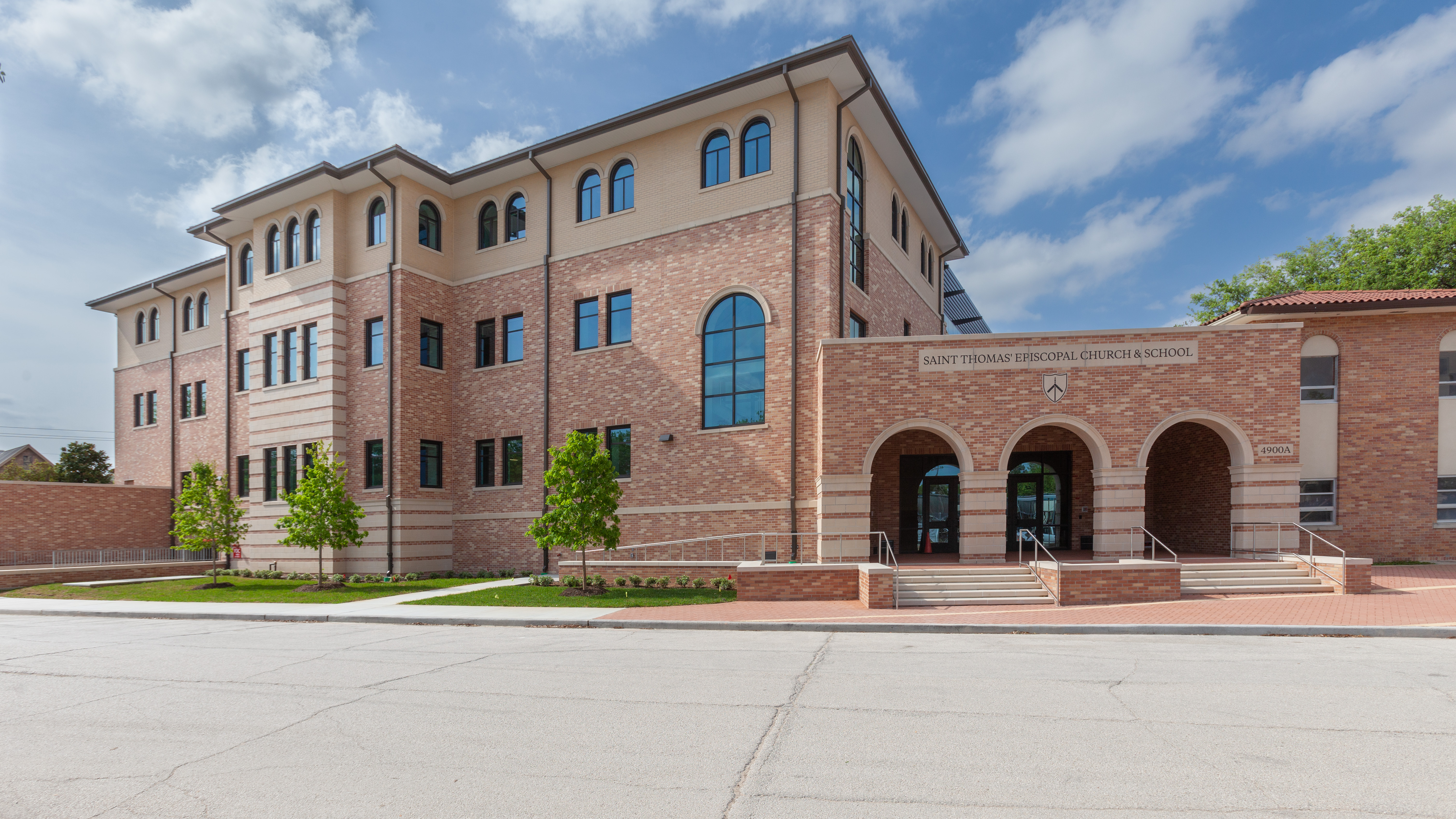

Location
- 4900 Jackwood Street; The Meyerland area of Houston, adjacent to Bellaire and West University Place; Houston, Texas 77096; United States; 29.685158°N 95.464732°W

Information
- Type: Independent
- Religious affiliation: Christianity
- Denomination: Episcopal
- Established: 1955
- Rector: David Browder
- Headmaster: Seraphim Danckaert
- Faculty: 126
- Grades: Preschool–12
- Gender: Girls and Boys
- Age range: 18 months to 18 years old
- Enrollment: 646
- Language: English
- Schedule: 8 periods on Monday, and 6 periods Tuesday through Friday. Daily chapel.
- Hours in school day: 8
- Colors: Navy blue and sandstorm gold
- Slogan: Classical Christian Education for Lifelong Learning
- Athletics: Yes
- Athletics conference: TAPPS
- Sports: Lower School: soccer, lacrosse, archery, basketball, fencing, tennis Middle School: cross country, volleyball, soccer, lacrosse, swimming, basketball, track, tennis, golf Upper School: cross country, volleyball, swimming, basketball, soccer, track, tennis, golf
- Mascot: Saints
- Team name: Saints
- Accreditation: SAES
- Yearbook: The Belltower
- Budget: $16 million
- Annual tuition: Preschool: $12,580 to $16,770 Kinder-1st: $24,765.00 2nd-3rd: $26,475.00 4th-5th: $26,630.00 6th-8th: $29,680.00 9th-12th: $32,970.00
- Website: www.stes.org
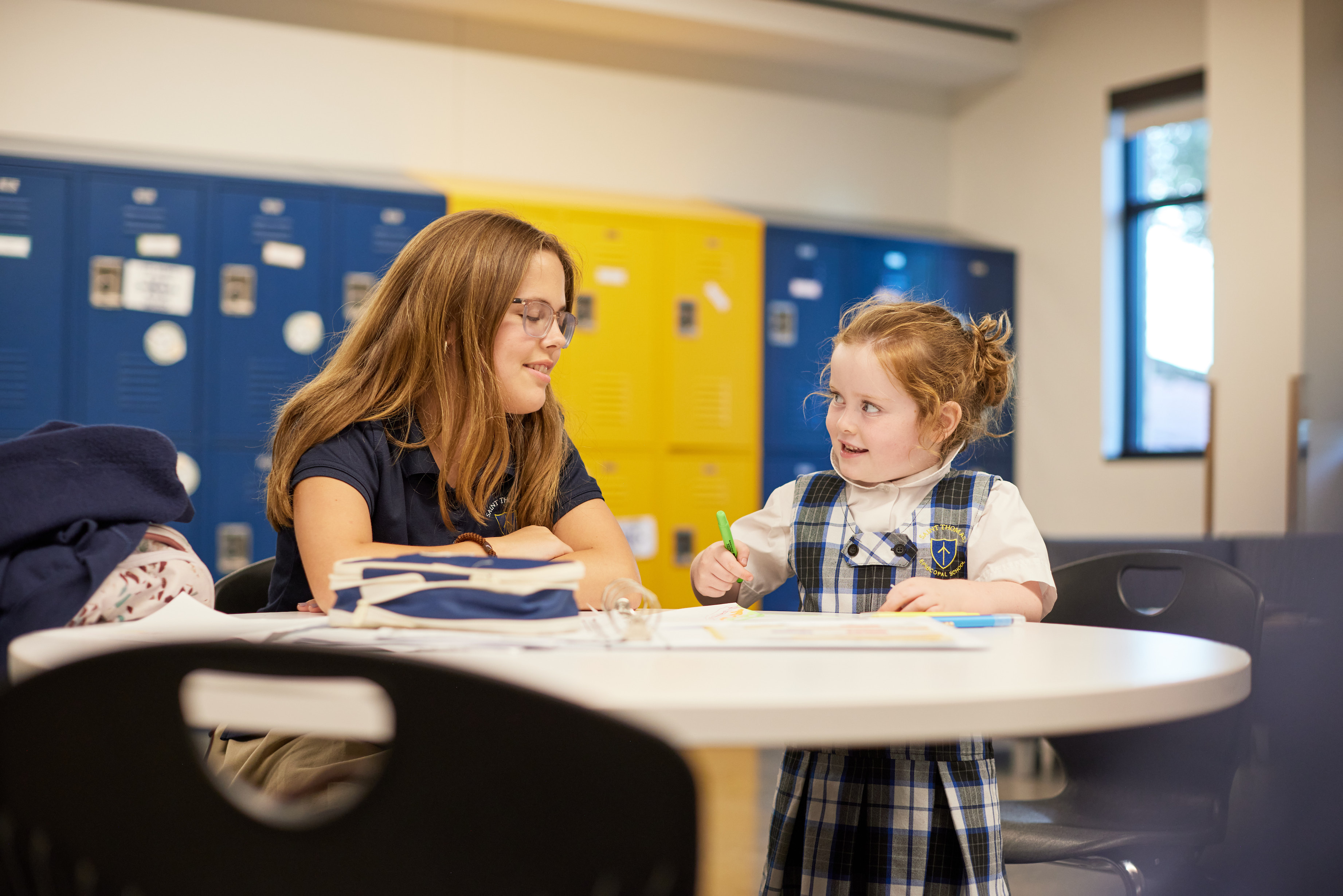

Saint Thomas' Episcopal School (STE) is a private, classical Christian, co-ed Episcopal day school serving pre-kindergarten through 12th grade. It is located in the Meyerland area of Houston, Texas. The school has 646 students and 126 faculty members. It is accredited by the Southwestern Association of Episcopal Schools (SAES) and is a member of the Houston Association of Independent Schools (HAIS) and the Texas Association of Private and Parochial Schools (TAPPS).

== History ==
The school opened in September 1955, under the guidance of founder T. Robert Ingram as an outreach mission of Saint Thomas' Episcopal Church. Its first high school class graduated in 1967.

The school was heavily impacted by Hurricane Harvey in 2017. Following the hurricane, the newest building on campus: Shaw Hall, was built.

== Awards and Recognition ==
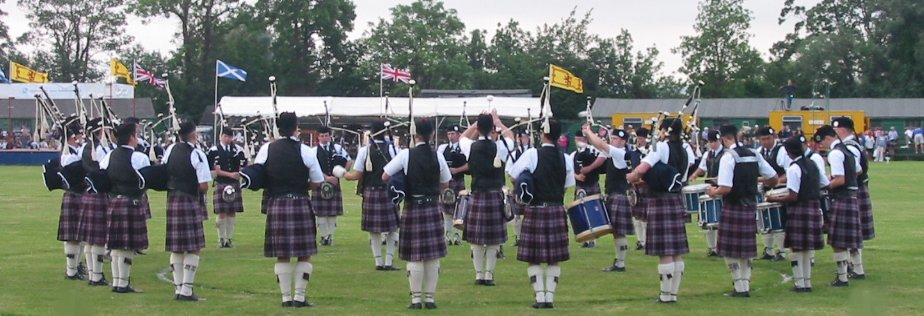
St. Thomas' Episcopal School Pipe Band competing at the Bridge of Allan Highland Games in Scotland

In addition to numerous National Merit Commended, Semifinalists, and Finalists each year, the school has produced National Merit Scholars.

The school offers a wide range of extracurricular and co-curricular activities for students at all levels. Popular academic offerings and teams include Mock Trial, Yearbook, Junior Classical League, and Robotics.

The boys' soccer program has placed first in the TAPPS state championships five times, including winning the 2019 and 2020 championships. The current head coach is Christopher White, who has compiled a 122-25-3 record. The girls' varsity soccer team won the TAPPS state championship in 2020. The boys' varsity cross country team won 5 TAPPS 3A state championships from 2009 to 2012 and again in 2014 while the varsity girls won their first championship in 2010. The varsity girls' swim team also won the state championship from 2010 to 2013 and again from 2015 to 2017. The high school orchestra has also competed at the State level competition, including winning first place among its division as one of the smallest groups competing (2013).

== Scottish Arts Program ==
The bagpipe and drum band and highland dancing team have been to Scotland on several occasions to compete in the World Championship Pipe Band Competition in Glasgow, Scotland. The band placed first in the Championship five times and individual dancers have received numerous accolades. In 2017, the band won the U.S. Pipe Band Championships in Norfolk, Virginia.

In the school year of 2011–2012, the school allowed female musicians to play in the bagpipe and drum band.

== See also ==
- Christianity in Houston
