= Pilgrim Lutheran School, Chicago =

Lutheran private school in Chicago, Illinois

Coordinates: 41.959809°N 87.677894°W

Pilgrim Ev. Luth. Church, 1921

Pilgrim Lutheran School, Chicago, is a Lutheran private school affiliated with Pilgrim Lutheran Church in Chicago, Illinois. Collectively, the church and school are referred to as Pilgrim Lutheran Church and School.

== About the school ==
Pilgrim Lutheran School is a private preschool and elementary school located at 4300 North Winchester on Chicago's North Side. Students begin at age three and continue through 8th grade.

The school was founded as a summer school in 1920. In 1921, it became a year-round school. In 2025, headed by Principal John Murphy, Pilgrim's enrollment averages about 50 students.

The school is fully accredited by the Evangelical Lutheran Education Association and has earned recognition by the Illinois State Board of Education.

== About the church ==
Pilgrim Lutheran Church is a member of the Evangelical Lutheran Church in America.

== School philosophy ==
The stated philosophy of Pilgrim Lutheran School is:

== Admissions policy ==
Pilgrim admits students of any race, color or national and ethnic origin.

== Pilgrim Kids Care ==
Pilgrim Kids Care is a program at Pilgrim Lutheran School that teaches social responsibility through action. Students participate in year-round projects to unite the community in awareness of the prevalence of youth hunger and homelessness.
