= List of Schools of the Sacred Heart =

The School of the Sacred Heart is an international network of private Catholic schools that are run by or affiliated with the Society of the Sacred Heart, which was founded in France by Saint Madeleine Sophie Barat. The Schools of the Sacred Heart were brought to the United States by Saint Rose Philippine Duchesne, where the association became known as the Network of Sacred Heart Schools. Their philosophy has five goals:

- Educate to establish a personal and active faith in God
- Educate to establish deep respect for intellectual values
- Educate to establish a social awareness which compels one to action
- Educate to establish the building of a community with Christian values
- Educate to establish personal growth in an atmosphere of wise freedom

== List of Schools of the Sacred Heart ==
Schools highlighted in blue can be clicked on for more information.

== Africa ==
=== Democratic Republic of the Congo (DRC) ===
- École Primaire, Kemi
- École primaire Tuzayana, Mont Ngafula
- Lycée de Kimwenza, Mont Ngafula
- Lycée Tuzayana & Ecole primaire Filles, Mboma
- Lycée Tuzayana/ Kipako, Kipako
- École maternelle bosangani, Gombé
- Lycée Sacre Cœur, Gombé

=== Tchad ===
- Lycée du Sacré-Cœur, Ndjamena

=== Egypt ===
- Collège du Sacre-Cœur, Heliopolis
- College du Sacre-Coeur, Ghamra - no longer part of the Network
- École du Sacre-Coeur, Minia - no longer part of the Network
- Sacred Heart School, Alexandria

=== Kenya ===
- Bishop Njenga Girls' Secondary School, Chekalini - no longer part of the Network

=== Uganda ===
- Agriculture School Bongorin
- Kangole Girls' Senior Secondary School, Moroto
- St. Charles Lwanga G.T.C. Kalunga, Masaka
- St. Bernadette Primary School, Nakibizzi - no longer part of the Network

== Asia ==
=== Korea ===
- Sacred Heart Girls' Middle School, Yongsan, Seoul - no longer a member of the Network
- Sacred Heart Girls' High School, Yongsan, Seoul - no longer a member of the Network

=== India ===
- Sacred Heart Convent Sr. Sec. School, Jagadhri, Haryana - Carmelites?
- Children of the New Dawn School, Vasoli - English
- Prerana Nursery School, Pune
- St. Clare's HIgh School, Pune - no longer part of the Network
- Sophia Nursery School, Sophia College (junior and senior), and Sophia Poltechnic Institute Mumbai - English
- Sadhana School of Special Education, Mumbai - no longer part of the Network
- St Theresa High School, Ahmednagar - no longer part of the Network
- Little Flower of Jesus High School - no longer part of the Network, Mumbai - no longer part of the Network
- Sacred Heart Convent High School, Ahmednagar- English
- Sacred Heart Convent High School, Nashik- English
- Sacred Heart Convent School, Parichha, Uttar Pradesh
- Sacred Heart High School, Kharagpur, West Bengal

=== Philippines ===
- Sacred Heart Academy of Pasig

=== Japan ===
- International School of the Sacred Heart, Shibuya, Tokyo Metropolitan Area - English
- Sapporo Seishin Joshi Gakuin, City of Sapporo, Hokkaido Prefecture - English
- Obayashi Seishin Joshi Gakuin, Takarazuka City - no longer part of the Network
- Fuji Seishin Joshi Gakuin, Susono City - no longer part of the Network
- Seishin Joshi Senmongakko (University), Tokyo - no longer part of the Network
- Seishin Joshi Gakuin: Sankocho, Tokyo - no longer part of the Network

=== Taiwan ===
- Sacred Heart Girls' High School, New Taipei City

== Australia and New Zealand ==
=== Australia ===
- Duchesne College, University of Queensland, St. Lucia, Queensland
- Kincoppal-Rose Bay, Sydney, New South Wales
- Sacré Cœur, Glen Iris, Victoria
- Sancta Sophia College, University of Sydney, Camperdown, New South Wales
- Stuartholme School, Toowong, Queensland

=== New Zealand ===
- Baradene College of the Sacred Heart, Auckland

== Europe ==
=== Austria ===
- Sacré Cœur Riedenburg, Bregenz
- Sacré-Cœur Graz, Graz
- PNMS/PHS Sacré-Cœur Pressbaum, Pressbaum
- Gymnasium Sacré Coeur Pressbaum
- Campus Sacré-Cœur Wien, (Währing) Vienna - primary and middle school campuses
- Die Expositur, Vienna
- Private Volksschule Sacré Coeur Wien, Vienna
- Kooperative Mittelschule Sacré Coeur Wien, Vienna
- Gymnasium Sacré Coeur Wien, Vienna
- HAK/HAS/AUL Sacré Coeur Wien (Commercial High School), Vienna

=== Belgium ===
- Centre Scolaire du Sacré-Cœur de Jette, Brussels
- Centre Scolaire Sacré-Cœur de Lindthout, Brussels
- Centre Scolaire Sacré-Cœur de Lindthout Kindergarten, Brussels
- Centre Scolaire Sacré-Cœur de Lindthout Primary School, Brussels
- École Maternelle du Sacré-Cœur, Jette
- École Primaire du Sacré-Cœur, Jette

=== France ===
- École Primaire de Roucas, Marseille
- École Primaire Sainte Odile, Montpellier
- Lycée du Sacré-Cœur, Amiens
- Institution de la Perverie, Nantes
- Collège/Lycée, Nantes
- Groupe Scolaire Sophie Barat, Chatenay-Malabry
- Institution Marmoutier, Tours
- Groupe Scolaire Sophie Barat, Paris
- Institution de la Croix Blanche, Lille
- Institution de la Croix-Blanche, Bondues - no longer part of the Network
- Groupe Scolaire Sophie Barat, Chatenay-Malabry - no longer part of the Network

=== Germany ===
- Katholische Schule Herz-Jesu, Berlin
- Sophie-Barat-Schule, Hamburg

=== Ireland ===
- Mount Anville Primary School, Dublin
- Mount Anville Secondary School, Dublin
- Mount Anville Montessori Junior School, Dublin
- Sacred Heart Primary School Roscrea, Tipperary
- Mount St Catherine’s Primary School, Armagh
- St Catherine’s College, Armagh

=== Italy ===
- Trinità dei Monti, Rome
- Istituto Sacro Cuore, Torino - no longer part of the Network
- Valsalice-Sacro Cuore, Torino - no longer part of the Network
- Istituto Sacro Cuore, Bergamo - no longer part of the Network
- Istituto Sacro Cuore, Genova - no longer part of the Network
- Istituto Sacro Cuore, Napoli - no longer part of the Network
- Istituto Sacro Cuore, Padova - no longer part of the Network
- Istituto Sacro Cuore, Palermo - no longer part of the Network

=== Poland ===
- Sacré Cœur Nursery and Primary School, Tarnow
- Lycee, Pobeiokiska - no longer part of the Network

=== Spain ===
- Colegio Menor Sagrado Corazon, Aracena – no longer part of the Network
- Sagrat Cor–Diputació, Barcelona
- Sagrat Cor-Besòs, Barcelona
- Fundacion Sagrado Corazon Sarria, Barcelona
- Colegio Sagrada Corazon, Barcelona – no longer part of the Network
- Colegio Mayor Sagrado Corazon – no longer part of the Network
- Colegio Sagrado Corazón Ikastetxea, Bilbao
- Colegio Ibaigane, Bilbao – no longer part of the Network
- Colegio Sagrado Corazon, Bilbao – no longer part of the Network
- Colegio del Sagrado Corazon, Fuerteventura
- Colegio Sagrado Corazon, Granada
- Colegio Menor Pablo VI, Granada – no longer part of the Network
- Colegio Virgen de Belen, Huelva – no longer part of the Network
- Colegio Sagrado Corazón Chamartín, Madrid
- Sagrado Corazón de Jesús (Rosales), Madrid
- Colegio Sagrado Corazon, Madrid – no longer part of the Network
- Residencia Universitaria Sofia Barat, Madrid – no longer part of the Network
- Colegio del Sagrado Corazon, Madrid – no longer part of the Network
- Colegio Beata Filipina, Madrid – no longer part of the Network
- Colegio Sagrado Corazon, Mallorca – no longer part of the Network
- Sagrado Corazón de Pamplona, Pamplona
- BUP Leyre, Pamplona – no longer part of the Network
- Sagrado Corazon de Jesús Placeres, Pontevedra
- Colegio Santa María del Valle, Mairena del Aljarafe, Sevilla
- Santa Maria de los Reyes, Sevilla
- Colegio del SAgrado Corazon, Soria – no longer part of the Network
- Santa Magdalena Sofia (La Punta), Valencia
- Colegio Sagrado Corazón/Collegi Sagrat Cor, (Godella) Valencia
- Gardenia Nazaret, Valencia – no longer part of the Network
- Colegio Sta. Magdalena Sofia, Zaragoza
- Colegio Santa Magdalena Sofía de Zaragoza (Valdefierro)

=== United Kingdom ===
==== England ====
- Digby Stuart College, University of Roehampton, London
- Sacred Heart High School, London
- Sacred Heart Primary School (Roehampton, Wandsworth), London
- Sacred Heart Primary School, Newcastle upon Tyne
- Sacred Heart Catholic High School, Newcastle upon Tyne
- Sacred Heart Catholic Secondary School, Camberwell
- Woldingham School, Surrey
- Beechwood Sacred Heart School, Kent - no longer part of the Network

==== Northern Ireland ====
- Mount St. Catherine's Primary School, Armagh
- St. Catherine's College, Armagh
- Sacred Heart Primary School Rock, Tyrone

==== Scotland ====
- Kilgraston School, Bridge of Earn, Perthshire
- St. Joseph's R.C. Primary School, Aberdeen

== North America ==
=== United States ===
- Academy of the Sacred Heart, Saint Charles Woonsocket, Rhode Island
- Academy of the Sacred Heart, Bloomfield Hills, Michigan
- Academy of the Sacred Heart, New Orleans, Louisiana
- Academy of the Sacred Heart, St. Charles, Missouri
- Carrollton School of the Sacred Heart, Miami, Florida
- Convent & Stuart Hall, San Francisco, California
- Convent of the Sacred Heart, Greenwich, Connecticut
- Convent of the Sacred Heart, New York City, New York
- Convent of the Sacred Heart (aka 'Seminary' & 'Academy' of the Sisters of the Sacred Heart), St. Joseph, Missouri 1855–1960
- Colegio del Sagrado Corazón, Puerto Rico
- Sacred Heart Academy Bryn Mawr, Bryn Mawr, Pennsylvania
- Duchesne Academy, Houston, Texas
- Duchesne Academy, Omaha, Nebraska
- Forest Ridge School of the Sacred Heart, Bellevue, Washington
- Josephinum Academy, Chicago, Illinois
- Newton Country Day School of the Sacred Heart, Newton, Massachusetts
- Princeton Academy, Princeton, New Jersey
- The Regis School, Houston, Texas
- Sacred Heart Schools, Atherton, California
- Sacred Heart Schools, Chicago, Illinois
- Schools of the Sacred Heart, Grand Coteau, Louisiana
  - Academy of the Sacred Heart
  - Berchmans Academy of the Sacred Heart
- Stone Ridge School, Bethesda, Maryland
- Stuart Country Day School, Princeton, New Jersey
- St. Philomena School of the Sacred Heart, Portsmouth, Rhode Island
- Villa Duchesne and Oak Hill School, St. Louis, Missouri
- Woodlands Academy, Lake Forest, Illinois
- Universidad del Sagrado Corazón, San Juan, Puerto Rico

=== Canada ===
- Sacred Heart School of Halifax, Halifax, Nova Scotia
- Sacred Heart School of Montreal, Montréal, Quebec

=== Mexico ===
- Colegio Guadalajara, Guadalajara, Jalisco
- Colegio Juan de Dios Peza, San Luis Potosí, San Luis Potosí
- Colegio Sagrado Corazón, México City
- Escuela Guadalupe, San Pedro Garza García, Nuevo León
- Instituto Mater del Sagrado Corazón, San Pedro Garza García, Nuevo León

== South America ==
=== Argentina ===
- Colegio Sagrado Corazón de Almagro, Buenos Aires
- Colegio Sagrado Corazón, Rosario, Santa Fé

=== Brazil ===
- Colégio Pitágoras, Cidade Jardim Belo Horizonte
- Colégio Madalena Sofia, Curitiba

=== Chile ===
- Colegio del Sagrado Corazon – Concepción, Concepción
- Colegio del Sagrado Corazón de Apoquindo – Las Condes, Santiago
- Colegio del Sagrado Corazon-Renaca, Vilna del Mar - no longer part of the Network
- Centro Educacional del Sagrado Corazon, Santiago - no longer part of the Network

=== Colombia ===
- Instituto Técnico Distrital Cruzada Social, Barranquilla

Colegio Sagrado Corazón de Jesús, Valle Del Lili, Cali

=== Peru ===
- Centro de Educación Basica Alternativa (CEBA) Sagrado Corazón, Puerto Inca, Huánuco
- Colegio Parroquial Sagrado Corazon – Trujillo, Trujillo
- Institución Educativa Sagrado Corazón – Agomarca
- Institución Educativa Sagrado Corazón – Lima
- Institución Educativa Parroquial Gratuita “Madre Admirable” - Lima
- Colegio Sagrado Corazón Sophianum - Arequipa
- Institución Educativa Sagrado Corazón - Jaén

=== Uruguay ===
- Colegio Sagrado Corazón-Paso Carrasco, Ciudad de la Costa
- Sagrado Corazon Garcia Lagos 8 - no longer part of the Network

== See also ==
Schools of the Sacred Heart alumni
