= Convent of the Sacred Heart High School (California) =

Convent High School
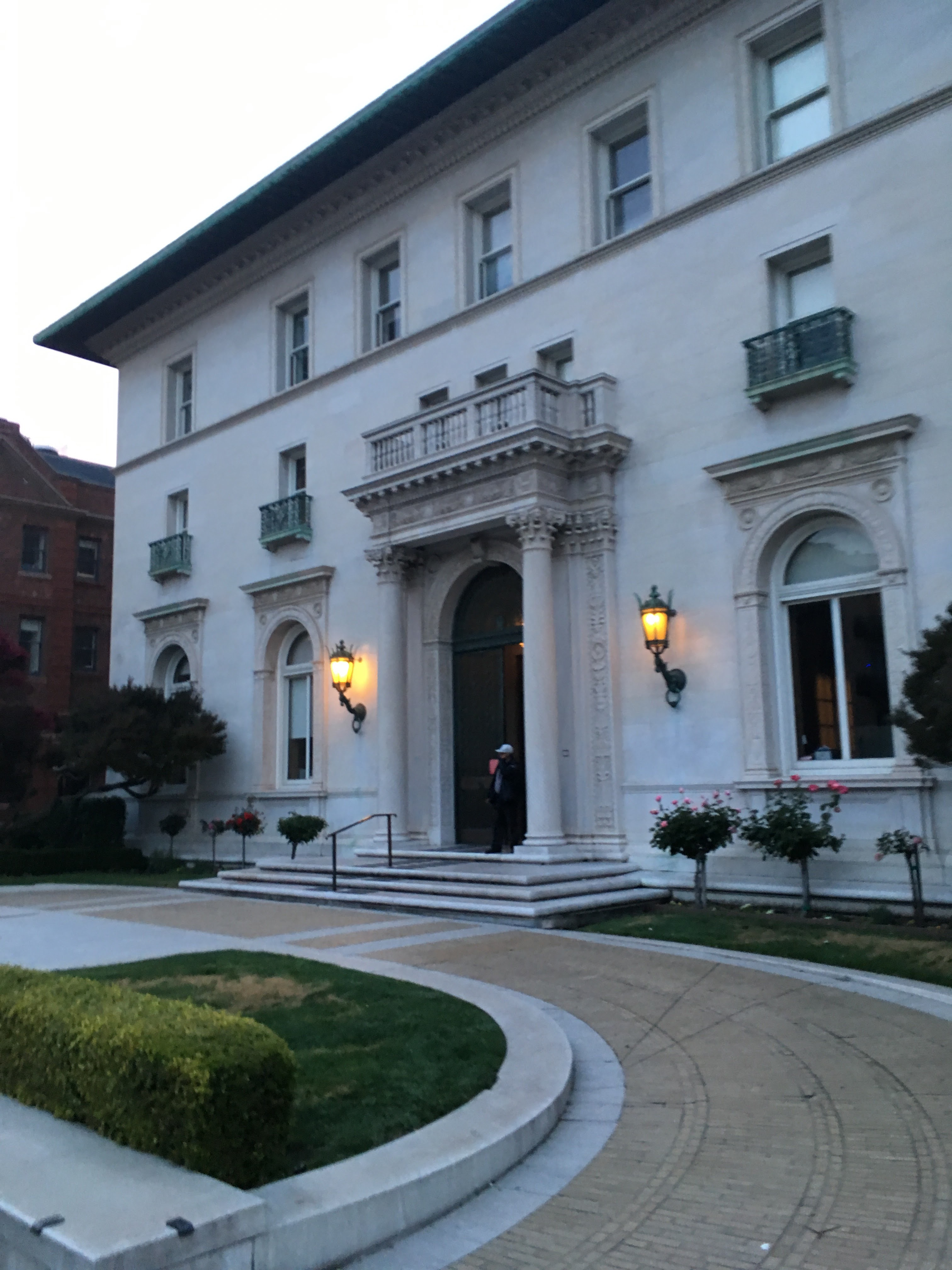
- Flood Mansion, one of the main buildings which houses Convent High School.

Location
- 2222 Broadway Street; San Francisco, California 94115; United States; 37°47′41″N 122°26′2″W

Information
- Type: Private
- Religious affiliation: Roman Catholic
- Established: 1887
- President: Ann Marie Krejcarek
- Grades: K–12
- Gender: Girls (coed affiliation)
- Enrollment: 1,100 (Convent & Stuart Hall)
- Average class size: 20
- Student to teacher ratio: 7:1
- Colors: Red and white
- Song: Coeur de Jesus
- Team name: Cubs
- Tuition: $55,015 (2024)
- Affiliation: Society of the Sacred Heart
- Website: https://www.sacredsf.org/

Convent of the Sacred Heart High School is a private, independent Catholic girls high school in San Francisco, California. It operates in partnership with the boys Stuart Hall High School as Convent & Stuart Hall.

== Academics ==
The school offers its students the rigorous International Baccalaureate program (IB) as well as an array of Advanced Placement courses (AP). As of 2019, the annual tuition for grades 9–12 is $45,900. Admission is selective and approximately 30% of the student body receives some form of financial aid.

== History ==
The school was originally founded by Mother Mary Keating on August 16, 1887, as the first School of the Sacred Heart west of the Rockies. The first year enrolled 30 young women operating in two rented Victorians at the corner of Bush and Octavia.

In 1888, they purchased a larger building at Franklin and Ellis for $10 in gold coin. They stayed there until the 1906 Earthquake when the building was heavily damaged. Renting another Victorian at the corner of Washington and Octavia, they were one of the first institutions to reopen after the earthquake. In 1909, the school purchased the Van Arsdale house on Jackson Street where the school remained until 1939. In June 1939, Maud Lee Flood donated the home she had shared with her deceased husband at 2222 Broadway. During WWII, boys were allowed to join the lower school. In 1950, the school purchased the neighboring Grant house for $150,000. The lower school, grades 1–8 split to the new location, while the upper school remained at the Flood Mansion. In 1956, they purchased the Hammond House (also located next door on the other side of the Flood Mansion) for $165,000 to open Stuart Hall for Boys.

The school now operates in partnership with the all boy's Stuart Hall High School located at 1715 Octavia Street. Typically the first two years, freshmen and sophomore year, are spent single sex but then become co-ed by junior year and higher-level courses. The partnership allows both schools to operate both single-sex and coeducational classes. Coed classes are held on both campuses and student shuttle buses operate between the two. The partnership is referred to as Convent & Stuart Hall.

Dianne Feinstein attended this school before becoming the city's mayor and later state of California Senator.

== Student life ==
The school's student-run newspaper is called "The Broadview". It has discussed issues including stress and toxic friendships (part of a bullying culture), as well as issues unique to Catholic schools such as lack of sex education.

== Notable alumni ==
- Dianne Feinstein (1951)
- Theresa Hak Kyung Cha
- Melissa de la Cruz
- Angela Alioto
- Susie Tompkins Buell
