= Convent & Stuart Hall =

School in San Francisco, California

Convent & Stuart Hall is an independent Catholic K-12 school in the city of San Francisco. The school was founded in 1887 by the Religious of the Sacred Heart of Jesus, also known as the Society of the Sacred Heart^{[1]}. The school consists of four divisions: Convent of the Sacred Heart High School, Stuart Hall High School, Convent Elementary School, and Stuart Hall for Boys. The school also operates under the name of Schools of the Sacred Heart, San Francisco offering single-sex and coeducational classes. It is part of the Network of Sacred Heart Schools.
