= Duchesne Academy of the Sacred Heart (Texas) =

Location
- 10202 Memorial Drive; Houston, Harris County, Texas 77024; United States; 29°46′40″N 95°29′08″W

Information
- Type: Private, Girls
- Motto: "Wise hearts, sharp minds."
- Religious affiliation: Roman Catholic
- Patron saint: Saint Rose Philippine Duchesne
- Established: 1960
- Founder: St. Rose Philippine Duchesne
- Sister school: Regis School
- CEEB code: 443363
- Head of school: Hillary Feerick-Hillenbrand
- Faculty: 164
- Grades: PK 3–12
- Gender: Girls
- Average class size: 14
- Student to teacher ratio: 8:1
- Campus type: Suburban
- Colors: Navy and Light blue
- Song: "Coeur de Jesus"
- Athletics: 15 Sports
- Mascot: Cha Cha the Charger
- Team name: Chargers
- Rival: St. Agnes
- Accreditation: Independent Schools Association of the Southwest (ISAS)
- Head of Upper School: Alaina Scorsone
- Head of Middle School: Suzy DeLeon
- Head of Lower School: Margaret Buza, Ph.D
- Head of Enrollment Management: Ginger Montalbano
- Website: www.duchesne.org

Duchesne Academy of the Sacred Heart (/djuːˈʃɛn/ dew-SHEN) is a combined primary and secondary independent girls' school located at 10202 Memorial Drive in Houston, Texas. A member of the Network of Sacred Heart Schools, it offers a college preparatory curriculum for girls.

Duchesne, which enrolls girls from pre-K3 to the 12th grade, is part of the Archdiocese of Galveston-Houston and the Independent Schools Association of the Southwest.

Duchesne is in the Memorial area and is east of the city of Hunters Creek Village.

== History ==
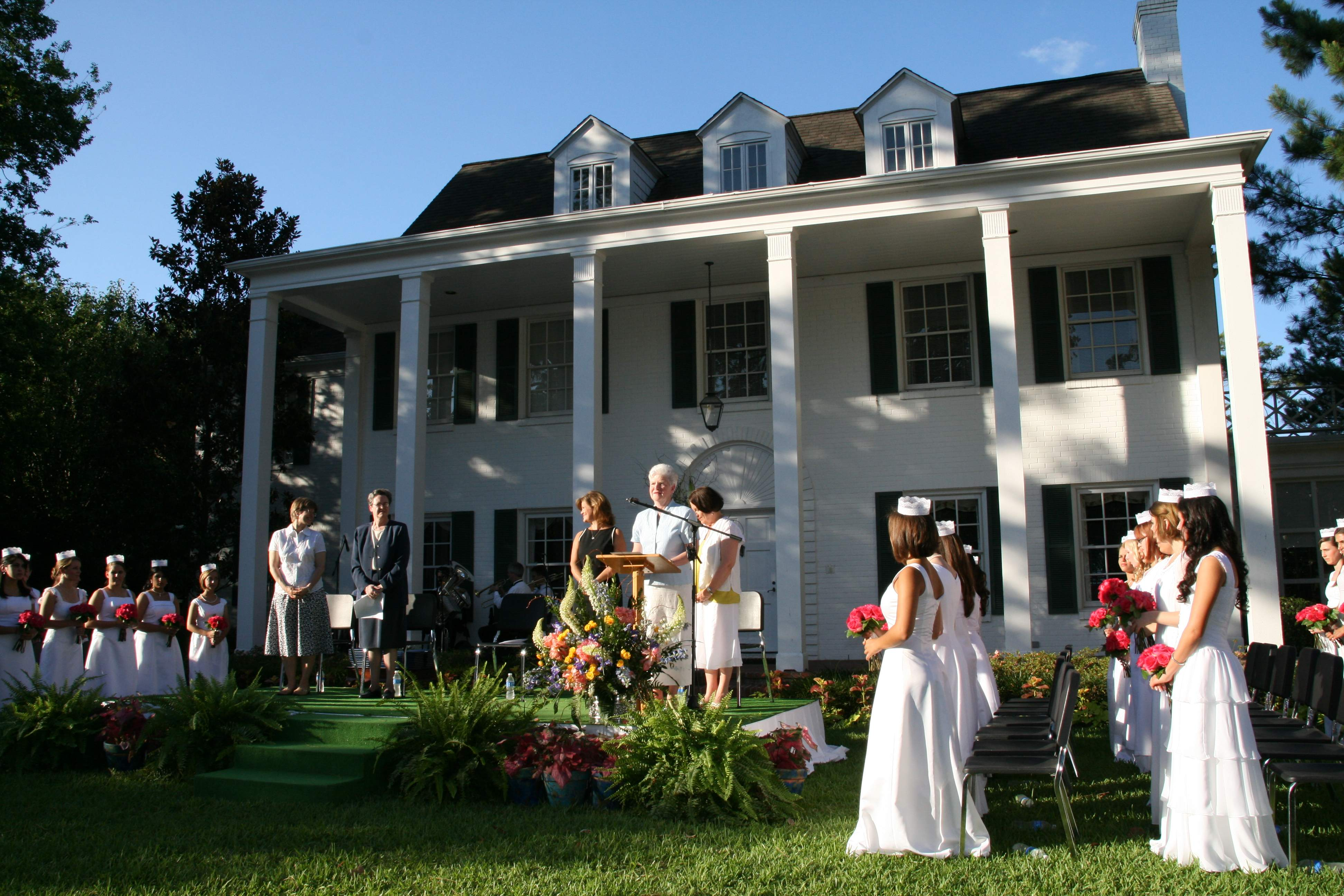
Commencement of the class of 2008

Duchesne was established in September 1960 as a part of the Network of Sacred Heart Schools, with 58 high-school pupils. The school is named after Saint Rose Philippine Duchesne, the first member of the Society of the Sacred Heart to come to America. The school is part of the Network of Sacred Heart Schools.

The campus was built around a large oak tree, in the center of its campus. It became a symbol for the school because the name "Duchesne" is French for "of the oak". The oak tree also represents a notable graduation tradition at Duchesne. As each senior is called up to receive her diploma, she passes under the oak tree.

On September 17, 2014, the original oak tree fell during a thunderstorm. it was over fifty years old and had been weakened after surviving a severe drought. On February 17, 2015, a new oak tree was transported by crane to a location near where the old oak tree previously stood and is currently still standing. The new oak tree allows the graduation tradition to continue.

Another fixture of the campus is a two-story white house that stood on the property when it was purchased for the school. It faces the oak tree and houses the RSCJ who live on campus. Some of the school's classes were originally conducted here.

== Student life ==
The school is divided into three divisions: the Lower School, Middle School, and Upper School. The school has an annual tradition known as Congé - a day where classes are canceled and the Senior class organizes games and activities for the entire school to participate in.

== Academics and culture ==
In 1974, Texas Monthly stated that students from Duchesne and nearby Saint Agnes Academy originated from "mostly business and professional people with money".

In 2017, Niche ranked Duchesne among the Best Private High Schools in the Houston metro area.

== Upper school curriculum ==
Upper school students must complete four years of English, history, science, and religion as well as three years of foreign language and mathematics to graduate. As a part of the student's religious studies, freshman and sophomores must complete two service projects each semester, while juniors and seniors take a social awareness course and volunteer throughout the Houston area. Additionally, Upper School students must have three fine arts bins, three computer science bins, and three PE bins by the time they graduate. Each 6 week module is one bin, three bins is the equivalent of one year-long course.

== Athletics ==
Duchesne offers 11 sports for students to participate in throughout the academic year. In the fall, Duchesne offers field hockey, cross country, and volleyball as sports. Soccer, basketball, and swimming are played in the winter season. In the spring, students play tennis, track and field, softball, and lacrosse, and golf. Duchesne is affiliated with the Southwest Preparatory Conference

== Notable organizations ==
=== Robotics ===
Iron Plaid 3103 is the school's all-girl high school robotics team associated with FIRST Robotics Competition (FRC). Founded in 2009, the team has won numerous awards, including the Rookie All-Star award and a Finalist award in 2009, the Engineering Inspiration award, Industrial Design award and Industrial Safety award in 2014, the Engineering Inspiration award in 2015 and in 2017. The team has attended championships a total of 4 times.

== See also ==
- Schools of the Sacred Heart - A list of schools that affiliate with the same network as Duchesne Academy
- The Regis School of the Sacred Heart – Brother school (Pre-K – 8th Grade)
- St. Thomas High School – Brother school (High School)
- St. Agnes Academy (Texas) - Private all-girls school (High School)
- Incarnate Word Academy (Houston) - Private all-girls school (High School)
- Christianity in Houston
