= Rose Philippine Duchesne =

French Catholic religious sister and missionary (1769-1852)

Saint Rose Philippine Duchesne R.S.C.J.
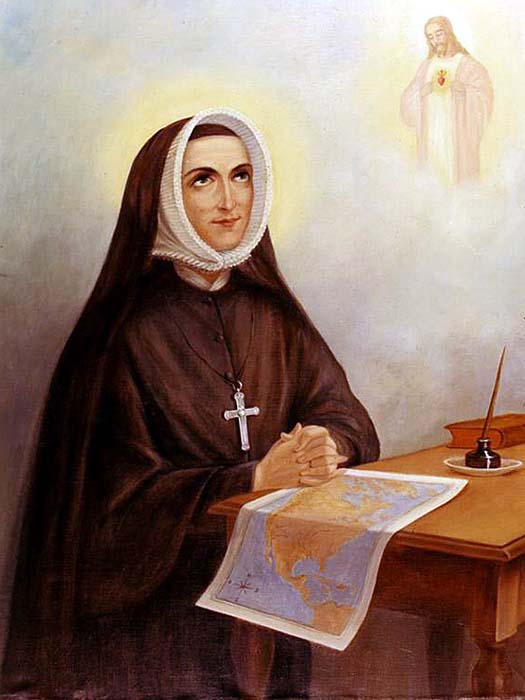

Missionary
- Born: August 29, 1769; Grenoble, Dauphiné, Kingdom of France
- Died: November 18, 1852 (aged 83); St. Charles, Missouri, U.S.
- Venerated in: Roman Catholic Church (United States & the Society of the Sacred Heart)
- Beatified: May 12, 1940, Vatican City, by Pope Pius XII
- Canonized: July 3, 1988, Vatican City, by Pope John Paul II
- Major shrine: Shrine of St. Rose Philippine Duchesne; St. Charles, Missouri
- Feast: November 18tn
- Patronage: perseverance amid adversity, Archdiocese of St. Louis; Diocese of Springfield-Cape Girardeau

Rose Philippine Duchesne, RSCJ (French pronunciation: [ʁoz filipin dyʃɛn]; August 29, 1769 – November 18, 1852), was a French religious sister and educator whom Pope John Paul II canonized in 1988. A native of France, she immigrated as a missionary to America, and is recognized for her care and education of Indigenous American survivors of the United States Indian removal programs.

Along with the founder, Madeleine-Sophie Barat, Duchesne was an early member of the Society of the Sacred Heart and established the congregation's first communities in the United States. She spent the last half of her life teaching and serving the people of the Midwestern United States, which was at that time considered the western frontier of the nation.

Duchesne was beatified on May 12, 1940, and canonized on July 3, 1988.

== Life ==
=== Early life ===
Rose Philippine Duchesne was born on August 29, 1769, in Grenoble, Dauphiné in the Kingdom of France to Pierre-François Duchesne (1748–1797) and Rose-Euphrosine Périer (1743–1814). Rose was the second of seven daughters, along with one son. Her father Pierre-François was a prominent lawyer during the Day of the Tiles. Her mother, Rose-Euphrosine was the sister of Claude Périer, an industrialist.

Pierre-Francois and Rose-Euphrosine lived in her parents' home in Grenoble. Her brother, Claude Perier and his wife lived in the house on a separate floor. Their home was located across from the Palace of Justice in Grenoble.

=== Monastery of the Visitation ===
As a child, Rose Duchesne survived a bout of smallpox, leaving her slightly scarred. In 1781, when Duchesne was age 12, her parents sent her to a school at the Monastery of Sainte-Marie-d'en-Haut near Grenoble, run by the Order of the Visitation of Holy Mary. Duchesnes soon became attracted to the idea of joining the Visitation Order. However, her father Pierre-Francois expressed his disapproval in 1782 by keeping her home to be educated by tutors. Duchesne's parish church was occasionally visited by priests who had served as missionaries to the Native American peoples in the former French colony of Louisiana in North America. These stories inspired a desire to minister to these peoples. When Duchesne was age 17, her parents arranged a future marriage for her.

By age 19 in 1788, Duchesne decided that she was going to join the Visitation Order, despite her family's opposition. She convinced an aunt to accompany her on a supposedly short visit to the monastery. Upon their arrival, Duchesne immediately requested permission to join the Order and remain at the monastery. The nuns granted her wish and the aunt returned alone to Grenoble. For the next three years, Duchesne remained at the monastery, living in a cloistered religious order.

The year 1789 saw the beginning of the French Revolution, which overthrew the rule of the French royal family and nobility. Over the coming years, the revolutionaries started seizing property of the Catholic Church and shutting down Catholic institutions. In 1791 or 1792, the revolutionaries closed the Monastery of Sainte-Marie-d'en-Haut, turning the campus into a prison and barracks. Duchesne rejoined her family at their country home near Grenoble. The beginning of the so-called Reign of Terror in 1793 saw the imprisonment or execution of numerous Catholic priests and members of religious orders. Throughout the 1790s, Duchesne spent her time nursing prisoners at the monastery, feeding and teaching children and bringing ministry to Catholics, all at great personal risk.

By the time that Napoleon Bonaparte rose to power in 1799, the political persecution of the Catholic Church in France had ended. In 1801, Duchesne and the other Visitation nuns were able to reoccupy the Monastery of Sainte-Marie-d'en-Haut. However, the campus was in terrible disrepair and the congregation did not have the funds to restore it. The mother superior and most of the nuns soon left the monastery. Duchesne, the new mother superior, was left at the monastery with a congregation of three nuns. The women opened a boarding school at the monastery

== Society of the Sacred Heart ==
=== Merger with Visitation congregation in Grenoble ===
In 1804, Madeleine-Sophie Barat, the founder of the Society of the Sacred Heart in France, traveled to Grenoble to meet Duchesne. Barat offered to merge the struggling Visitation congregation into a new Sacred Heart congregation in Grenoble, located at the monastery. Duchesne accepted Barat's offer, beginning a close lifelong friendship between the two women. While both religious orders were focused on training teachers and educating children, Sacred Heart was not cloistered, unlike Visitation. In 1815, after the end of the Napoleonic Wars in Europe, Barat asked Duchesne to start a new congregation in Paris. She established the Convent of the Sacred Heart in Paris, where she opened a school. Duchesne served as the mistress of novices for the new congregation.

=== Missionary in America ===
==== Recruitment by Bishop DuBourg ====
In 1817, Bishop Louis DuBourg of the Diocese of Louisiana and the Two Floridas visited the Convent of the Sacred Heart in Paris. Louisiana had become an American state in 1812. DuBourg wanted to recruit religious sisters to help him evangelize the Native American peoples in the diocese and educate their children along with the Acadian French children. Duchesne immediately agree to do as long as Barat, the head of the Sacred Heart Order, gave her permission. Duchesne, who had never lost her desire to serve as a missionary, begged permission from Barat to serve in the bishop's diocese.

In 1818, with Barat's blessing, Duchesne sailed from France on the ship Rebecca to New Orleans, Louisiana with four other Sacred Heart sisters. The ship was supposed to stop at Havana in the Spanish colony of Cuba, but was denied entry. In the Gulf of Mexico, the ship was stopped by a pirate ship from Argentina. However, after learning that the Rebecca was American, the pirates let it pass unmolested. After ten weeks at sea, they arrived in New Orleans to discover that Dubourg had not arranged their accommodations. The local congregation of Ursuline nuns offered to lodge them. The sisters then took a paddle steamer up the Mississippi River to travel to the city of St. Louis in the Missouri Territory, where Dubourg had moved the year before. Duchesne's river trip took seven weeks.

=== Missouri Territory ===
After a short time in St. Louis, the sisters arrived at their final destination, the small community of St. Charles, 20 miles (32 km) north of St. Louis. Dubourg later described St. Charles then as "the remotest village in the U.S."; The sisters established a new Sacred Heart convent in a log cabin there, dubbing it the "Duquette Mansion".They also started a free school in St. Charles, the first one west of the Mississippi River. "Poverty and Christian heroism are here", she wrote of the site, "and trials are the riches of priests in this land". DuBourg in 1819 moved the sisters across the Missouri River to the town of Florissant, where they opened a new school along with a novitiate.

When Duchesne had arrived in Louisiana, she was surprised to learn that African slavery was legal in some parts of the United States; the French crown had officially banned in France 500 years earlier. One area with legalized slavery was the Missouri Territory. According to the journalist Rachel L. Swarns, Duchesne wrote in 1822: “In spite of my repugnance for having Negro slaves, we may be obliged to purchase some.” DuBourg gave her an enslaved person around 1822.

Duchesne in 1821 opened a convent and novitiate in Grand Coteau, Louisiana. The operation was transferred in 1825 to the town of Baron, Louisiana, later renamed Convent, Louisiana. The novitiate over the years trained many prominent members of Sacred Heart. At one point, she wrote, "Poverty and Christian heroism are here", and trials are the riches of priests in this land."

During the 1820s, Duchesne's mission expanded to ministering to European Catholic immigrants. Waves of poor German immigrants had been arriving in the Missouri territory, starting farms in rural communities. By 1828, Sacred heart had grown to six congregations, operating several schools.

==== Kansas ====
In 1841, the Jesuit priest Pierre-Jean De Smet asked the Sisters to join the Jesuits in a new mission with the Potawatomi tribe near present-day Mound City, Kansas. The Jesuits originally did not invite Duchesne to join the mission as she was 71-years-old. However, the priest Peter Verhaegen insisted that she be allowed to come, saying, "She may not be able to do much work, but she will assure success to the mission by praying for us."

Once at the mission, Duchesne attempted to learn the Potawatomi language, but could not master it sufficiently to teach classes. Instead, she spent her time in prayer, prompting the Potawatomi children to name her Quahkahkanumad (Woman Who Prays Always). Inspired by De Smet's stories about the Rocky Mountains, Duchesne had a desire to see them. However, in 1842, after spending a year at the Potawatomi mission, Duchesne's health forced her return to St. Charles.

== Final years and death ==
In 1842. Sacred Heart opened its first Canadian mission in Montreal, Quebec. Duchesne spent the last decade of her life at the Sacred Heart Convent in St. Charles. She occupied a tiny room under a stairway near the chapel and spent her days in solitude and prayer. Toward the end of her life, she was alone, going blind and increasingly debilitated. She wrote about her wish for letters from her old friend Barat and her wish to travel. She wrote,

"I live now in solitude and am able to use my time reflecting on the past and preparing for death. I cannot put away the thought of the Indians and in my ambition I fly to the Rockies".

Duchesne died on November 18, 1852 at the convent in St. Charles at age 83. She was buried in the convent cemetery.

== Legacy ==
In 1855, a small shrine for Duchesne was constructed on the grounds of the Academy of the Sacred Heart in St. Charles and her remains were relocated there. The remains were exhumed in 1951 and transferred to the Shrine of Saint Rose Philippine Duchesne in St. Charles.

=== Schools ===
- Duchesne Academy of the Sacred Heart, Houston, Texas
- Duchesne Academy of the Sacred Heart, Omaha, Nebraska
- Duchesne Elementary School, Salt Lake City, Utah
- Duchesne High School, St. Charles, Missouri
- Duchesne High School, Duchesne, Utah
- Duchesne Primary School, Florissant, Missouri
- Villa Duchesne, St. Louis, Missouri
- Saint Rose Philippine Duchesne, Garnett, Kansas

=== Buildings ===
- Duchesne Building, Digby Stuart College, London, England (renamed in 2018)
- Duchesne Hall, Boston College, Boston, Massachusetts
- Duchesne Hall, Maryville University, Town and Country, Missouri

In 2018, on discovering Duchesne's ownership of enslaved people, the Digby Stuart College in London, England, founded by the Sisters of the Sacred Heart, renamed the Duchesne Building after South African President Nelson Mandela.

== Veneration ==
=== Beatification ===
The cause for Duchesne's canonization was introduced in 1895; she was declared Venerable in 1909 by Pope Pius X. Duchesne was beatified by Pope Pius XII on May 12, 1940, and the cause for her canonization was opened on April 9, 1943. The Vatican in 1951 ordered Sacred Heart to build a more suitable shrine for Duchesne's remains. A new larger shrine was completed that summer and they were relocated there.

=== Canonization ===
In 1951, Marie Bernard, a Sacred Heart sister, was suffering from an inoperable malignant tumor on her neck. Her prognosis was poor. After praying to Duchesne, Bernard recovered. When this case was examined by the Vatican for verification of a miracle, it was rejected. The cause for Duchesne's canonization went dormant.

Pope John Paul II in 1986 asked Archbishop John L. May of Philadelphia if there were an American Catholic who might be a candidate for canonization, preferably not one from Philadelphia. The pope was hoping to canonize someone on his upcoming papal trip to the United States. After reexamining the Bernard case that had been dismissed in the 1950's, the Vatican determined that it was indeed a miracle. The Sacred Heart sisters in the United States were uncertain about supporting Duchesne as a candidate, due to a tense relationship with the increasingly conservative Vatican. However, the leadership in the United States Province of the order eventually came to support it. Pope John Paul II canonized Duchesne in Rome on July 3, 1988.

== See also ==
- List of Americans venerated in the Catholic Church
- Saint Rose Philippine Duchesne, patron saint archive
- Theophile Papin, who delivered to Pope Pius the testimony taken in connection with Duchesne's canonization

== Bibliography ==
- Catherine M. Mooney, Philippine Duchesne: A Woman with the Poor (NY: Paulist Press, 1999; rpt. Wipf & Stock, 2007)
