= Sacred Heart Church =

Sacred Heart Church or Sacred Heart Catholic Church or variations may refer to:

== Albania ==
- Sacred Heart Church (Tirana)

== Australia ==
- Sacred Heart Church, Hindmarsh, Adelaide, South Australia
- Sacred Heart Church, St Kilda, Victoria

== Austria ==
- Herz-Jesu-Kirche (Church of the Sacred Heart of Jesus), Graz

== Belgium ==
- Basilica of the Sacred Heart, Brussels

== Bosnia and Herzegovina ==
- Sacred Heart Church, Doboj

== Canada ==
- Sacred Heart Church of the First Peoples
- Sacred Heart Church (Peterborough, Ontario)

== China ==
- Sacred Heart Cathedral (Guangzhou)
- Sacred Heart Church, Zhongding, Yunnan

== Cuba ==
- Sacred Heart of Jesus Catholic Church (Sandino, Cuba)

== Fiji ==
- Sacred Heart Church (Fiji)

== France ==
- Basilica of the Sacred Heart of Paray-le-Monial
- Sacré-Cœur, Paris
- Sacré Cœur (disambiguation)

== Germany ==
see also Herz-Jesu-Kirche (disambiguation)

- Sacred Heart Church (Berlin)
- Sacred Heart Church, Lübeck

== Gibraltar ==
- Sacred Heart Church, Gibraltar

== Hungary ==
- Sacred Heart Church (Kőszeg, Hungary)

== India ==
- Sacred Heart Church, Chandannagar, West Bengal
- Sacred Heart Catholic Church, Mathura, Uttar Pradesh
- Sacred Heart Church, Mylapra, Kerala
- Basilica of the Sacred Heart of Jesus, Pondicherry
- Sacred Heart Church, Santacruz, Karnataka
- Sacred Heart Forane Church, Thiruvambady, Kerala
- Sacred Heart Church, Hosur, Tamil Nadu
- Sacred Heart Church, Madagondapalli, Tamil Nadu
- Sacred Heart Church, Kelamangalam, Tamil Nadu

== Indonesia ==
- Ganjuran Church (Church of the Sacred Heart of Jesus)

== Iran ==
- Sacred Heart of Jesus Church, Kermanshah

== Iraq ==
- Sacred Heart Church (Baghdad)
- Sacred Heart of Jesus Church (Baghdad)
- Sacred Heart Church (Basra)
- Sacred Heart Church (Tel Keppe)
- Sacred Heart Cathedral (Kirkuk)

== Ireland ==
- Church of the Sacred Heart, Oola, County Limerick
- Church of the Sacred Heart, Templemore, County Tipperary
- Church of the Sacred Heart, Dublin, County Dublin

== Italy ==
- Sacro Cuore (disambiguation)

== Lithuania ==
- Church of the Sacred Heart of Jesus, Vilnius

== Malta ==
- Sacred Heart of Jesus Church, Fontana

== Montenegro ==
- Church of the Holy Heart of Jesus, Podgorica

== Netherlands ==
- Sacred Heart Church, The Bottom, Saba

== Pakistan ==
- Sacred Heart Cathedral, Lahore
- Sacred Heart Church, Keamari

== Peru ==
- Sacred Heart Church, Lima
- Iglesia de la Recoleta (Lima), also known as Church of the Sacred Hearts of Jesus and Mary

== Philippines ==
- Sacred Heart Parish Kamuning, Quezon City; see Cubao Cathedral

== Poland ==
- Church of the Sacred Heart of Jesus, Bydgoszcz
- Church of the Most Sacred Heart of Jesus in Szombierki, Bytom
- Church of the Sacred Heart of Jesus, Grabowo Królewskie
- Basilica of the Sacred Heart of Jesus, Kraków
- Church of the Sacred Heart of Jesus, Węgierki

== Portugal ==
- Church of the Sacred Heart of Jesus (Ermesinde)
- Estrela Basilica (Royal Basilica and Convent of the Most Sacred Heart of Jesus), Lisbon

== Romania ==
- French Church (Bucharest), or French Church of the Sacred Heart, Bucharest

== Serbia ==
- Church of the Sacred Heart of Jesus, Futog
- Church of the Sacred Heart of Jesus, Šid

== Singapore ==
- Church of the Sacred Heart, Singapore

== Spain ==
- Sagrat Cor, Barcelona

== Syria ==
- Church of the Sacred Heart of Jesus (Latakia)

== United Kingdom ==
=== England ===
- Sacred Heart Church, Battersea, London
- Church of the Sacred Heart of Jesus and St Cuthbert, Bedford, Bedfordshire
- Sacred Heart Church, Blackpool, Lancashire
- Sacred Heart Church, Bournemouth, Dorset
- Church of the Sacred Heart, Camberwell, London
- Sacred Heart Church, Caterham, Surrey
- Sacred Heart Church, Exeter, Devon
- Church of the Sacred Heart and St Catherine of Alexandria, Droitwich, Worcestershire
- Church of the Sacred Heart, Fareham, Hampshire
- Sacred Heart Church, Hanley, Staffordshire
- Sacred Heart Church, Hillsborough, Sheffield
- Church of the Sacred Heart, Hove, East Sussex
- Sacred Heart Church, Kilburn, London
- Sacred Heart Church, Leeds, West Yorkshire
- Sacred Heart Church, Liverpool, Merseyside
- Sacred Heart Church, Middlesbrough, North Yorkshire
- Sacred Heart Church, North Gosforth, Newcastle upon Tyne
- Sacred Heart Church, Petworth, West Sussex
- Sacred Heart Church, Teddington, London
- Sacred Heart Church, Tunstall, Staffordshire
- Our Lady of the Sacred Heart Church, Wellingborough, Northamptonshire
- Sacred Heart Church, Wimbledon, London

=== Scotland ===
- Church of the Sacred Heart, Edinburgh
- Sacred Heart Church, Glasgow

== United States ==
=== Arizona ===
- Sacred Heart Church (Phoenix, Arizona)
- Sacred Heart Catholic Church and Rectory (Prescott, Arizona)
- Sacred Heart Church (Tombstone, Arizona)

=== California ===
- Sacred Heart Catholic Church (Alturas, California)
- Sacred Heart Church (Los Angeles, California), a Los Angeles Historic-Cultural Monument
- Sacred Heart Parish Complex (San Francisco)
- Sacred Heart Church (Saratoga, California)

=== Colorado ===
- Sacred Heart Catholic Church (Alamosa, Colorado)
- Sacred Heart Church (Denver, Colorado), a Denver Landmark
- Sacred Heart Church (Pueblo, Colorado)

=== District of Columbia ===
- Dahlgren Chapel of the Sacred Heart
- Shrine of the Sacred Heart

=== Florida ===
- Sacred Heart Catholic Church (Pensacola, Florida)
- Sacred Heart Catholic Church (Tampa, Florida)

=== Georgia ===
- Basilica of the Sacred Heart of Jesus (Atlanta)
- Sacred Heart Catholic Church (Augusta, Georgia)

=== Hawaii ===
- Sacred Heart Catholic Church in Hawi
- Sacred Heart Church (Honolulu, Hawaii)

=== Illinois ===
- Sacred Heart Church (Chicago)
- Sacred Heart Church (Lombard, Illinois)

=== Iowa ===
- Sacred Heart Catholic Church (Dubuque, Iowa)
- Sacred Heart Catholic Church (Fort Dodge, Iowa)

=== Kentucky ===
- Sacred Heart Church (Bellevue, Kentucky)

=== Maine ===
- Sacred Heart Catholic Church (Yarmouth, Maine)

=== Maryland ===
- Sacred Heart Church (Bowie, Maryland)

=== Massachusetts ===
- Sacred Heart Church, Rectory, School and Convent (Cambridge, Massachusetts)
- Sacred Heart Parish Complex (Lawrence, Massachusetts)
- Sacred Heart Church Historic District (Southbridge, Massachusetts)

=== Michigan ===
- Sacred Heart Church (Detroit)

=== Minnesota ===
- Church of the Sacred Heart (Freeport, Minnesota)
- Sacred Heart Catholic Church (Heron Lake, Minnesota)
- Sacred Heart of Jesus Church (Minneapolis)

=== Mississippi ===
- Sacred Heart Roman Catholic Church (Port Gibson, Mississippi)

=== Missouri ===
- Sacred Heart Church, School and Rectory, Kansas City
- Sacred Heart Catholic Church and Parsonage (Rich Fountain, Missouri)
- Sacred Heart Roman Catholic Church (Ozora, Missouri)

=== Montana ===
- Sacred Heart Church (Glendive, Montana)

=== Nebraska ===
- Sacred Heart Catholic Church (Omaha, Nebraska)

=== New Jersey ===
- Sacred Heart Church (Trenton, New Jersey)
- Sacred Heart Church (Jersey City)
- Cathedral Basilica of the Sacred Heart (Newark)

=== New York ===
- Church of the Sacred Heart (Bronx)
- Church of the Sacred Hearts of Jesus and Mary & St. Stephen (Brooklyn)
- Church of the Sacred Heart of Jesus (New York City)
- Church of the Sacred Hearts of Jesus and Mary (Manhattan)
- Sacred Heart Church (Staten Island)

=== North Carolina ===
- Sacred Heart Church (Raleigh, North Carolina)
- Sacred Heart Catholic Church (Salisbury, North Carolina)

=== Pennsylvania ===
- Basilica of the Sacred Heart of Jesus, Conewago
- Sacred Heart Church (Sharon, Pennsylvania)

=== Ohio ===
- Sacred Heart of Jesus Church (Bethlehem, Ohio)
- Sacred Heart of Jesus Church (Cleveland)
- Sacred Heart Church (Columbus, Ohio)
- Sacred Heart Church (Dayton, Ohio)
- Sacred Heart Catholic Church (McCartyville, Ohio)
- Sacred Heart Church (Pomeroy, Ohio)

=== Oklahoma ===
- Sacred Heart Catholic Church and Rectory (Wilburton, Oklahoma)

=== Tennessee ===
- Sacred Heart of Jesus Church (Lawrenceburg, Tennessee)
- Sacred Heart of Jesus Church (Loretto, Tennessee)

=== Texas ===
- Sacred Heart Catholic Church (Abilene, Texas), a historic place in Taylor County
- Sacred Heart Catholic Church and School, Palestine
- Sacred Heart Catholic Church (Galveston), a historic place in Galveston County

=== Virginia ===
- Church of the Sacred Heart Parish (Petersburg, Virginia)
- Church of the Sacred Heart (Richmond, Virginia)

=== Washington ===
- Sacred Heart Catholic Church (Winlock, Washington)

=== Wisconsin ===
- Sacred Heart Church (Eau Claire, Wisconsin)

== Vietnam ==
- Church of the Sacred Heart of Jesus, Ho Chi Minh City (Tân Định Church)

== See also ==
- Sacred Heart Parish Complex (disambiguation)
- Basilica of the Sacred Heart (disambiguation)
- Sacred Heart Cathedral (disambiguation)
- Herz-Jesu-Kirche (disambiguation)
- Sacré Cœur (disambiguation)
- Sacro Cuore (disambiguation)
- Sacred Heart (disambiguation)
- Commons:Structured gallery of Sacred Heart churches
