= Herz-Jesu-Kirche (disambiguation) =

Herz-Jesu-Kirche is a church in Graz, Austria.

Herz-Jesu-Kirche (Sacred Heart Church) may also refer to:

== Germany ==
- Sacred Heart Church (Berlin) (German: Herz-Jesu-Kirche), Berlin
- Herz-Jesu-Kirche, Bierbach
- Herz Jesu Fechenheim, Frankfurt am Main
- Herz Jesu Oberrad, Frankfurt am Main
- Herz-Jesu-Kirche, Mainz
- Herz-Jesu-Kirche, Munich, Neuhausen-Nymphenburg
- Herz Jesu, Sonnenberg, Wiesbaden

== See also ==
- Sacred Heart Church (disambiguation)
- Sacré Cœur (disambiguation)
- Sacro Cuore (disambiguation)
