= Basilica of the Sacred Heart =

Basilica of the Sacred Heart may refer to:

== Belgium ==
- Basilica of the Sacred Heart, Brussels

== Colombia ==
- Basilica of the Sacred Heart of Jesus, Bogotá

== France ==
- Basilica of the Sacred Heart of Nancy
- Basilica of the Sacred Heart of Paray-le-Monial
- Sacré-Cœur, Paris

== India ==
- Basilica of the Sacred Heart of Jesus, Pondicherry

== Italy ==
- Sacro Cuore di Gesù a Castro Pretorio, Rome

== New Zealand ==
- Sacred Heart Basilica, Timaru

== Poland ==
- Basilica of the Sacred Heart of Jesus, Kraków

== Portugal ==
- Estrela Basilica, Lisbon
- Basilica of the Sacred Heart of Jesus, Póvoa de Varzim

== United States ==
- Basilica of the Sacred Heart (Notre Dame), Indiana
- Cathedral Basilica of the Sacred Heart (Newark), New Jersey
- Basilica of the Sacred Heart of Jesus, Syracuse, New York
- Basilica of the Sacred Heart of Jesus (Atlanta), Georgia
- Basilica of the Sacred Heart of Jesus, Conewago, Pennsylvania
- Basilica of the Co-Cathedral of the Sacred Heart, Charleston, West Virginia

== See also ==
- Sacred Heart Cathedral (disambiguation)
- Sacred Heart Church (disambiguation)
