= Sacred Heart, New York City =

Sacred Heart, New York City, may refer to the following:

- Sacred Heart of Jesus School New York 456 West 52nd St
- Convent of the Sacred Heart (New York)
- Sacred Heart Church (Brooklyn) / Church of the Sacred Hearts of Mary and Jesus (Brooklyn, New York), merged to become the Sacred Hearts of Jesus and Mary – St. Stephen (Brooklyn, New York)
- Sacred Heart Church (Bronx)
- Church of the Sacred Hearts of Mary and Jesus (New York City), closed. Merged with Our Lady of the Scapular-St. Stephen Church (New York City)
- Church of the Sacred Heart of Jesus (New York City), 457 W. 51st St.
- Sacred Heart Church (Staten Island)
