= Sacred Heart Parish Complex =

Sacred Heart Parish Complex may refer to:

- Sacred Heart Parish Complex (Lawrence, Massachusetts), NRHP-listed
- Sacred Heart Parish Complex (San Francisco), SFDL-listed and NRHP-listed

== See also ==
- Sacred Heart Church (disambiguation)
- Sacred Heart Cathedral, Sacred Heart School and Christian Brothers Home in Minnesota
