= Oola Castle =

Tower house in County Limerick, Ireland

- Caisleán Úlla (Irish)
- Oolla Castle
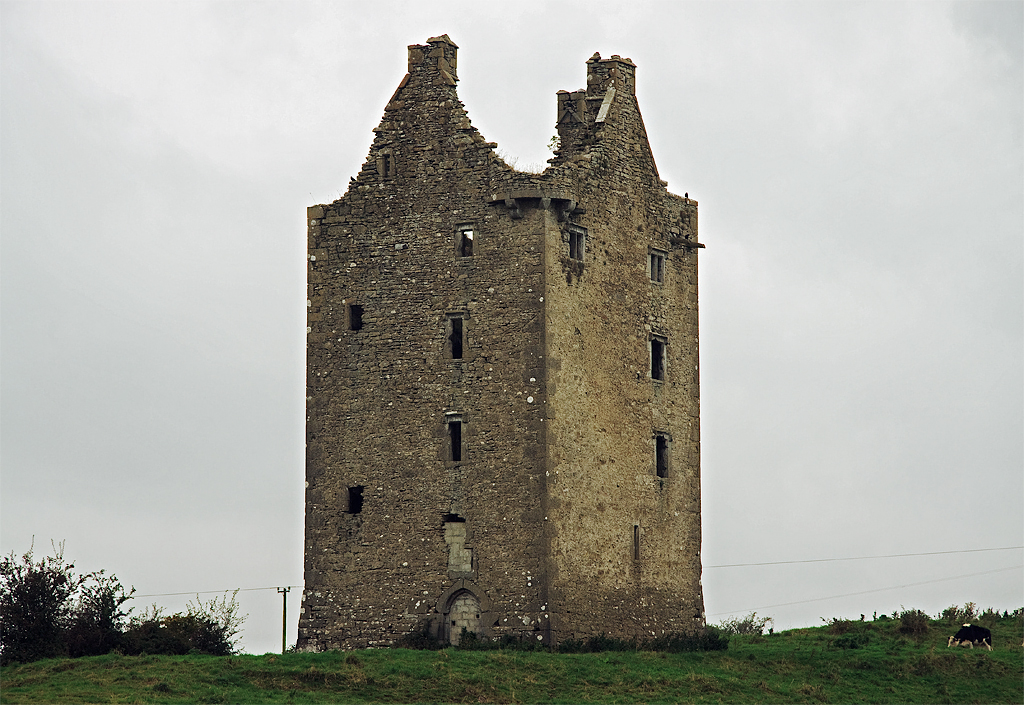

- Location within Ireland
- 52°31′41″N 8°14′31″W
- Type: Tower house
- Location: Oolahills East, Oola, County Limerick, Ireland

History
- Built: c. 1550–1600

Site notes
- Architectural style: Renaissance

Oola Castle is a tower house located in County Limerick, Ireland.

== Location ==
Oola Castle is located 1 km (0.62 mi) east of the village of Oola. It lies in the Golden Vale, 30 km (19 mi) southeast of Limerick.

It should not be confused with the castle in Ballyneety nearby, which is sometimes called "Oola Castle."

== History ==
The current building dates to the late 16th century and was built by the O'Briens. It is classified as a "later" tower house; according to Claire Foley and Colm Donnelly, "greater provision of heat and light, married to Renaissance concepts of symmetry, was incorporated into the traditional building form to create a new tower-house paradigm, as expressed at buildings such as Oola [Castle]."

In 1825, antlers of the giant deer ("Irish elk") were discovered; and, in 1828, a bronze trumpet, spear and arrowheads of bronze were found. All were placed in the museum of Trinity College, Dublin.

== Castle ==
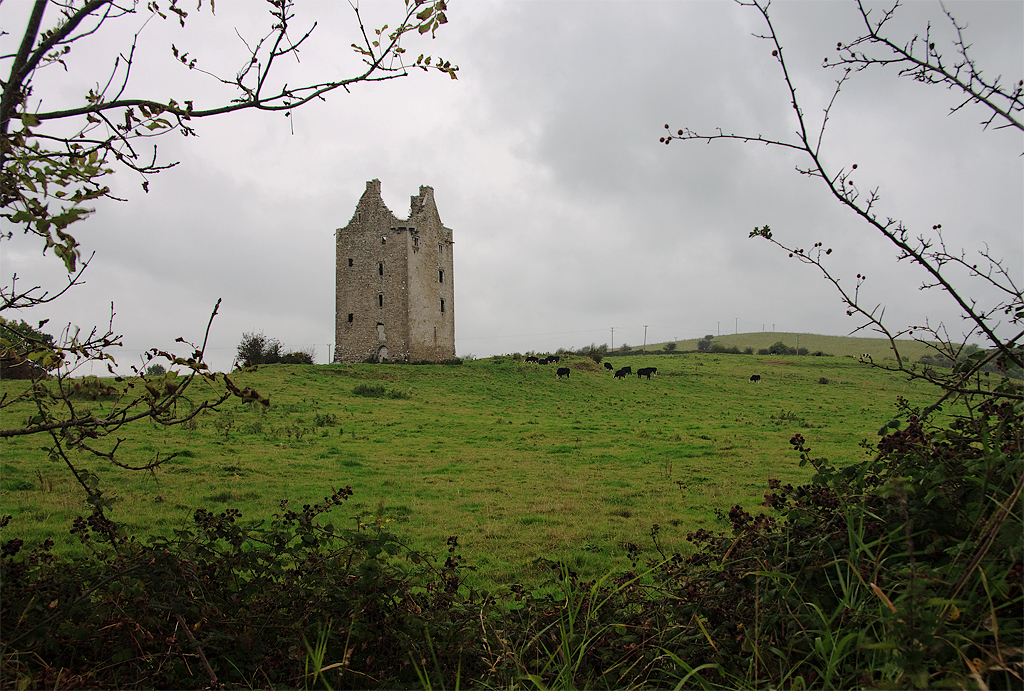
View of Oola castle

The castle is a square six-storey limestone tower house. There are circular bartizans on the northeast and southwest corners. The upper windows have hood moulding, and the east and west walls have their original fireplaces.

When it was in use, it would have had whitewashed walls, gables crowned with chimneys and mullioned windows.
