= Węgierki =

- Village
- Location within Poland
- Coordinates: 52°19′N 17°40′E
- Country: Poland
- Voivodeship: Greater Poland
- County: Września
- Gmina: Września

Węgierki [vɛnˈɡʲɛrki] is a village in the administrative district of Gmina Września, within Września County, Greater Poland Voivodeship, in west-central Poland.

== Monuments ==
- Church of the Sacred Heart of Jesus, Węgierki
- Węgierki Palace
