= Węgierki Palace =

- Pałac w Węgierkach
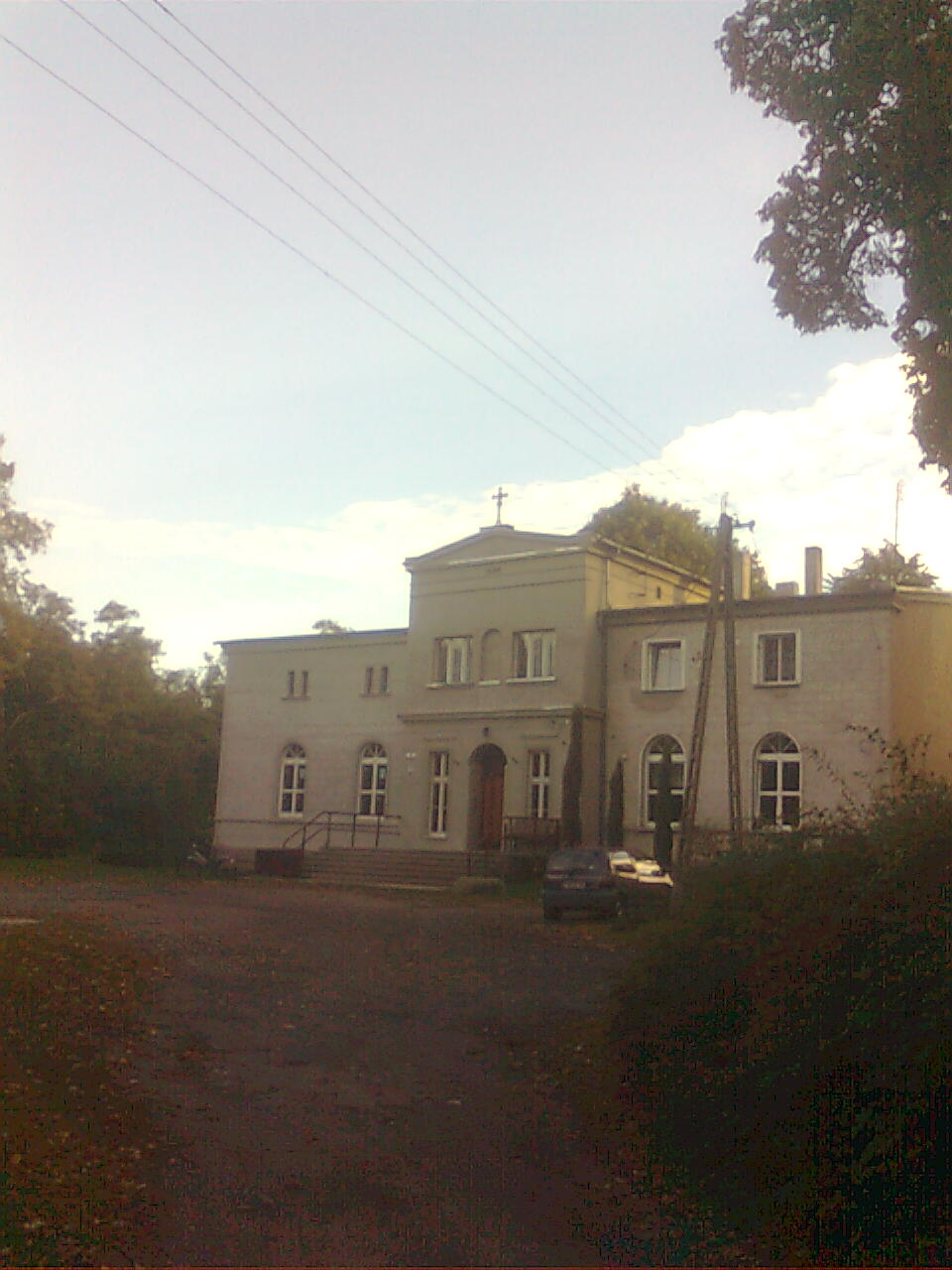
- Front view of the palace

- Location within Poland

General information
- Type: Palace
- Architectural style: Neoclassical
- Location: Węgierki, Poland
- Coordinates: 52°19′14″N 17°40′22″E
- Completed: 1880

Węgierki Palace is a historic palace in Węgierki (Września County, Poland). Since 1974 national heritage site (Polish: zabytek).

The palace was built in the second half of the 19th century (around 1890) and has elements of neoclassical architecture. This building housed a library and a school. Today the building is divided into apartments. During 2011 and 2012 a renovation of the palace's facade was carried out.

There was a natural park, with an area of about 3.06 ha, established in the 19th century.

== Gallery ==
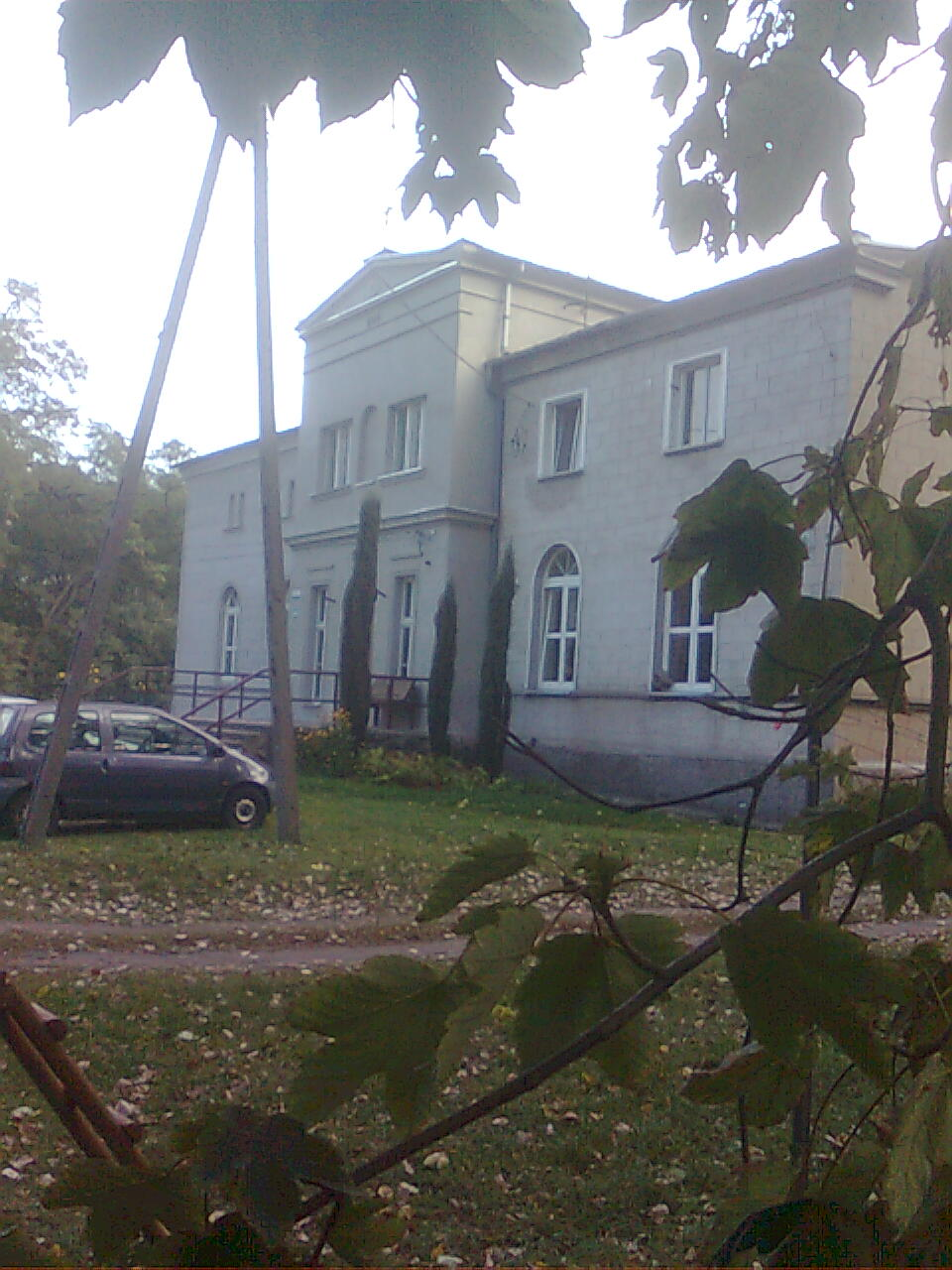
Western side of palace

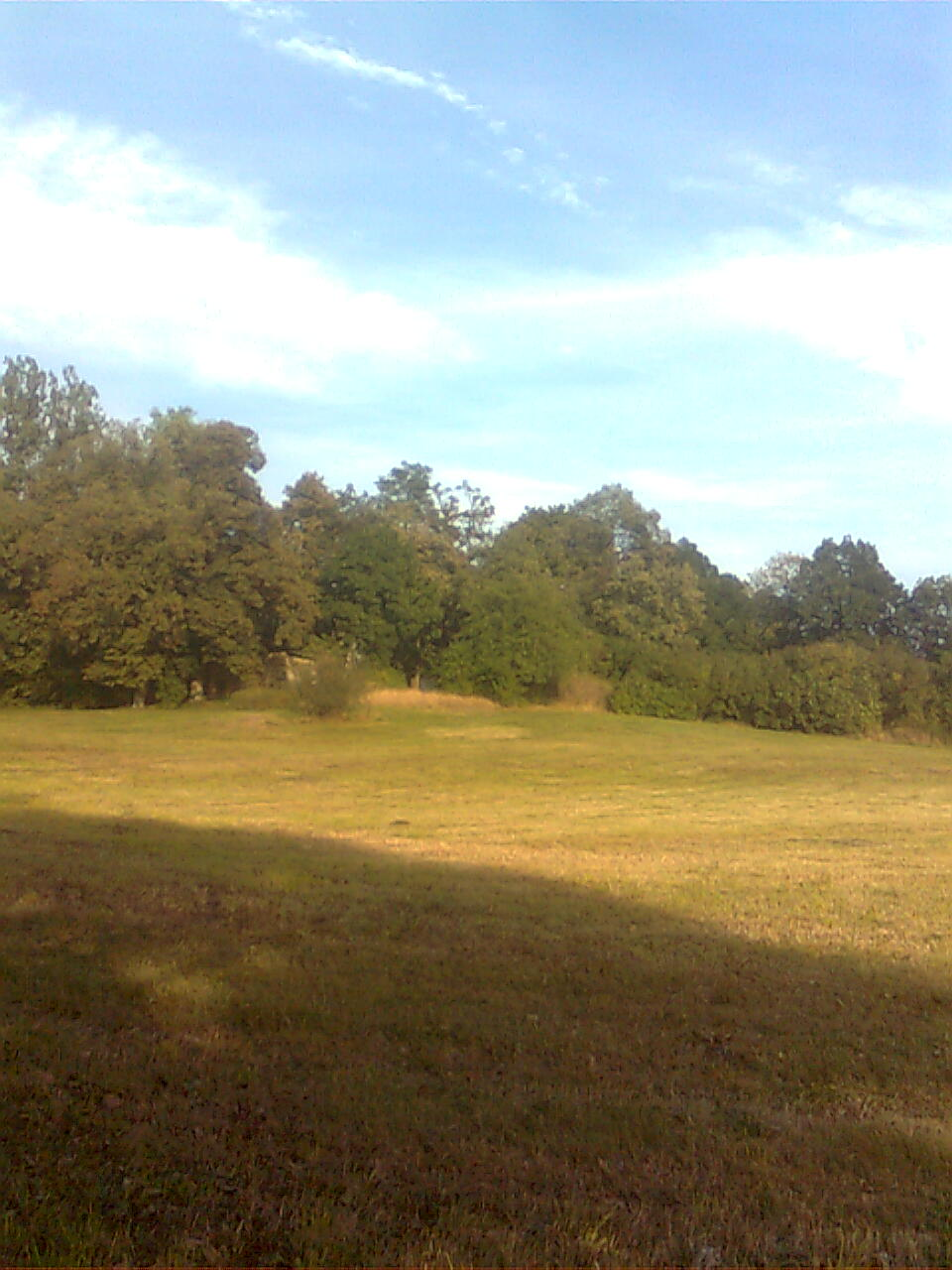
Park next to the palace

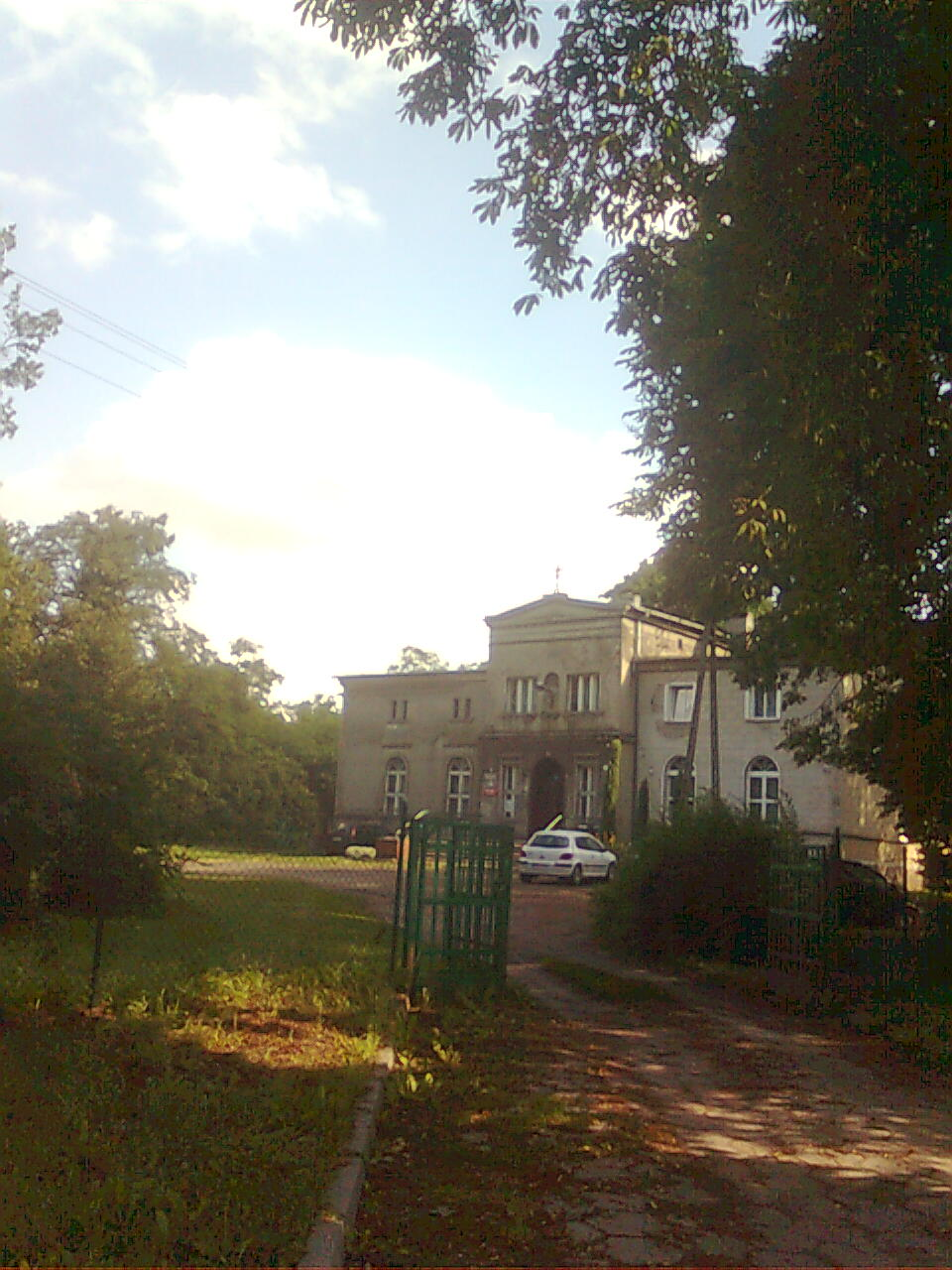
The front elevation

== Sources ==
- Franciszek Jaśkowiak, Województwo poznańskie - przewodnik, Warszawa 1967
