= Oola =

Village in County Limerick, Ireland

Oola Úlla
- Village
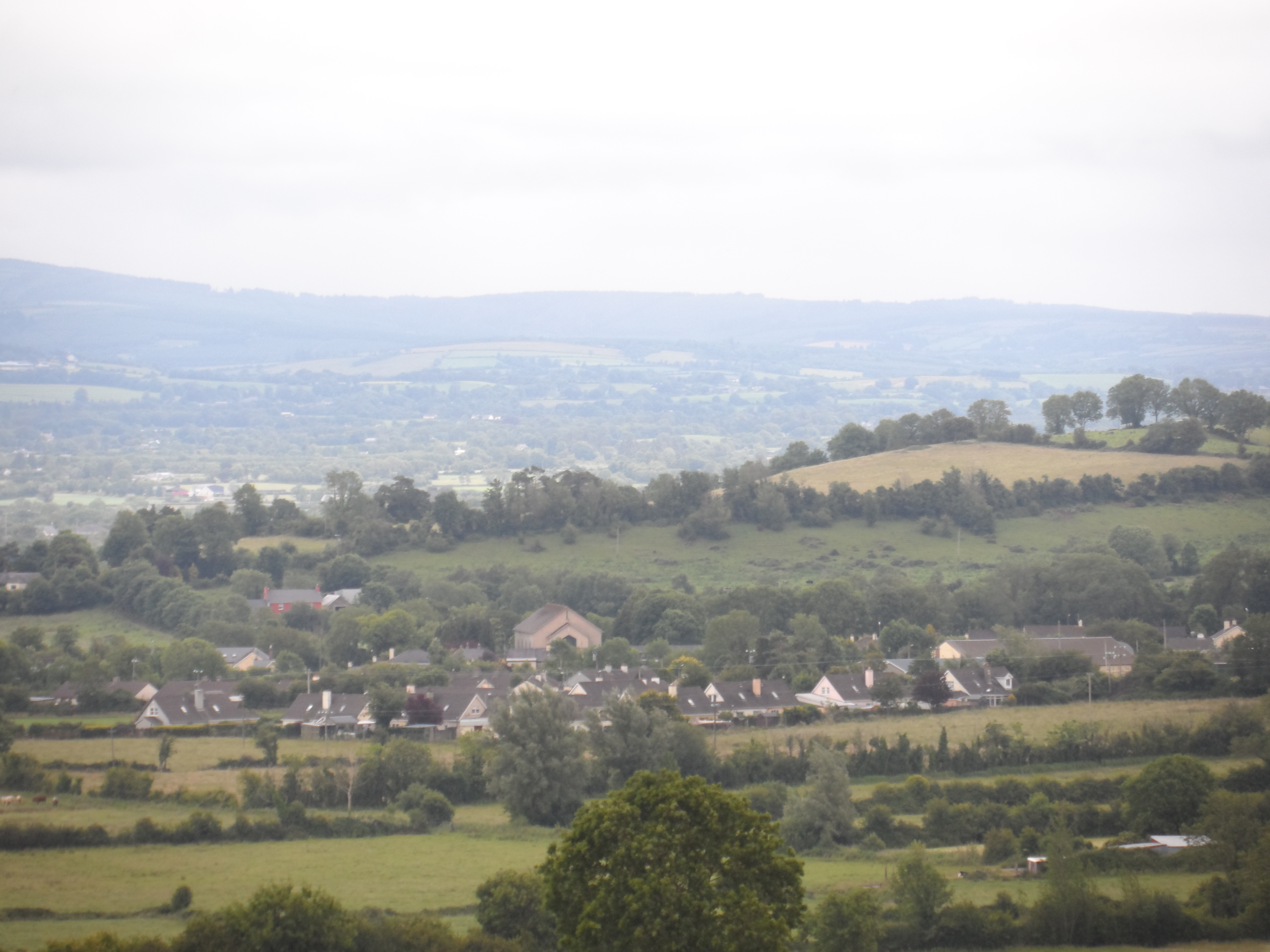
- Oola view from nearby Prospect Hill, facing northeast. Above the town is the Hill of Oola, and beyond are the Silvermine Mountains.

- Location in Ireland
- Coordinates: 52°31′47″N 08°15′34″W
- Country: Ireland
- Province: Munster
- County: County Limerick

Population (2016)
  - Total: 324
- Time zone: UTC+0 (WET)
  - Summer (DST): UTC-1 (IST (WEST))

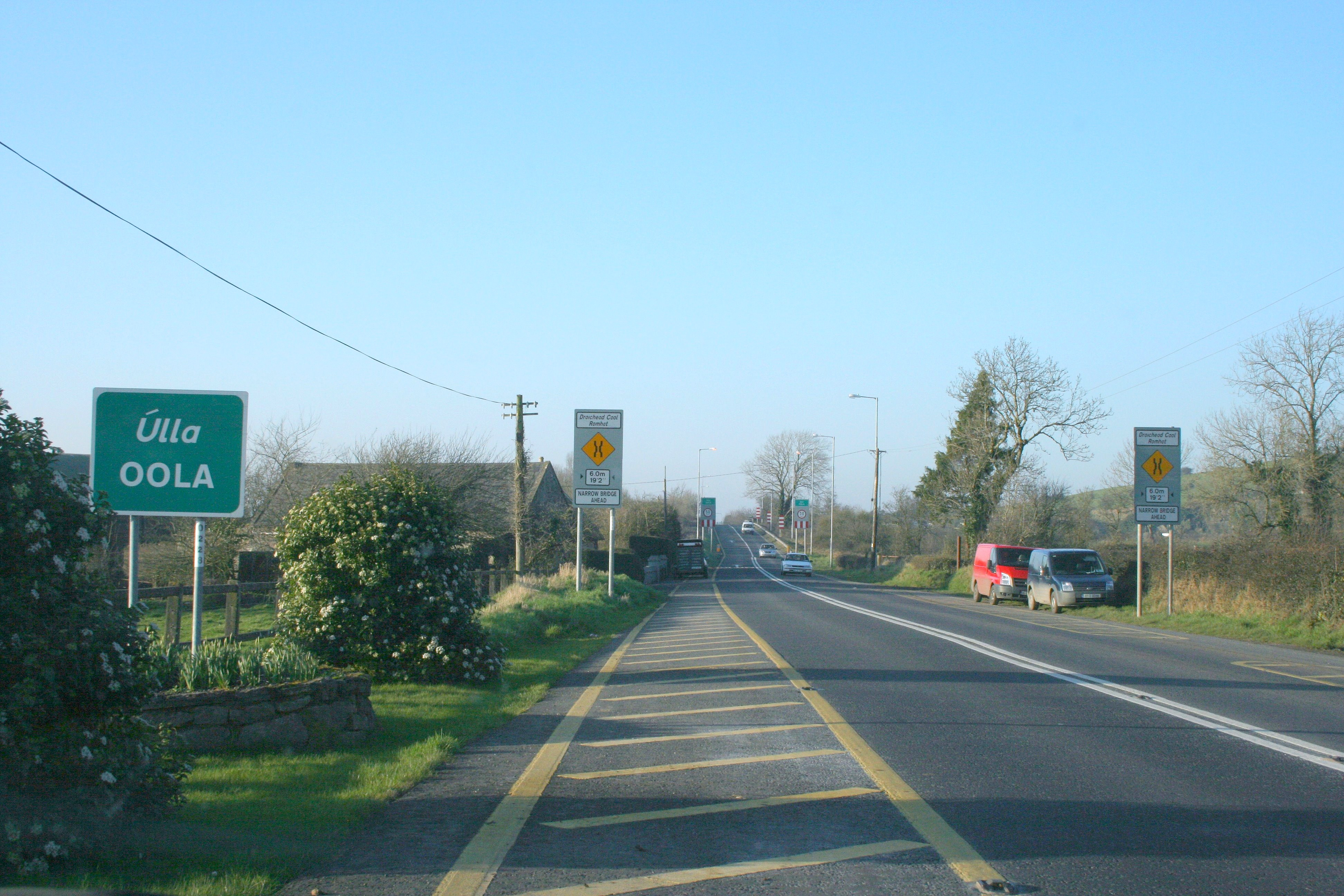
Approach to Oola on the N24

Oola (Irish: Úlla, meaning 'round hillocks' [ˈuːl̪ˠə] or Uibhle [ˈɪvʲlʲə]) is a village in County Limerick in Ireland. It is near the border with County Tipperary in the midwest of the country. The village is home to a Catholic church (Church of the Sacred Heart), a petrol station, a convenience store, two public houses, a GAA pitch, a post office, a takeaway, a betting shop, a credit union, a hall, and a chemist. As of the 2016 census, Oola had a population of 324 inhabitants. The village is in a civil parish of the same name.

== History ==
The ruins of Oola Castle stand close to the village and in 1825, some large and perfect antlers of the Irish elk were discovered; and, in 1828, a brazen trumpet, and spear and arrowheads of bronze were found, which were placed in the museum of Trinity College, Dublin.

== Transport ==
The main N24 road from Limerick to Waterford passes through the town, with the town of Tipperary lying 12 kilometres southeast of Oola.

Though the town is no longer connected to the rail network, the important station at Limerick Junction is nearby, 5 km to the south-east. Oola railway station opened on 9 May 1848 and finally closed on 9 September 1963.

Oola is on Bus Éireann's "Expressway" route no. 55, which runs between Limerick and Waterford several times a day.

== See also ==
- List of towns and villages in Ireland
