= Sacro Cuore =

Sacro Cuore is the Italian for Sacred Heart and may refer to:

== Churches in Italy ==
- Sacro Cuore, Alcamo
- Sacro Cuore, Florence
- Sacro Cuore, Monza
- Sacro Cuore del Suffragio, Rome
- Sacro Cuore di Cristo Re, Rome (Basilica)
- Sacro Cuore di Gesù, Grosseto (Basilica)
- Sacro Cuore di Gesù, Tolentino
- Sacro Cuore di Gesù a Castro Pretorio (Basilica)
- Sacro Cuore di Gesù agonizzante a Vitinia, Rome
- Sacro Cuore di Maria, Rome
- Nostra Signora del Sacro Cuore, Rome

== Other ==
- Sacro Cuore di Gesù a Vitinia, titulus presbyteralis
- Università Cattolica del Sacro Cuore, Italian university
  - Università Cattolica del Sacro Cuore Schools
  - Rector of Università Cattolica del Sacro Cuore

== See also ==
- Sacred Heart (disambiguation)
- Sacré Cœur (disambiguation)
- Herz-Jesu-Kirche (disambiguation)
