= Sacred Heart Church, Doboj =

Coordinates: 44.7348°N 18.0813°E

Sacred Heart Church
- Crkva Presvetog Srca Isusova
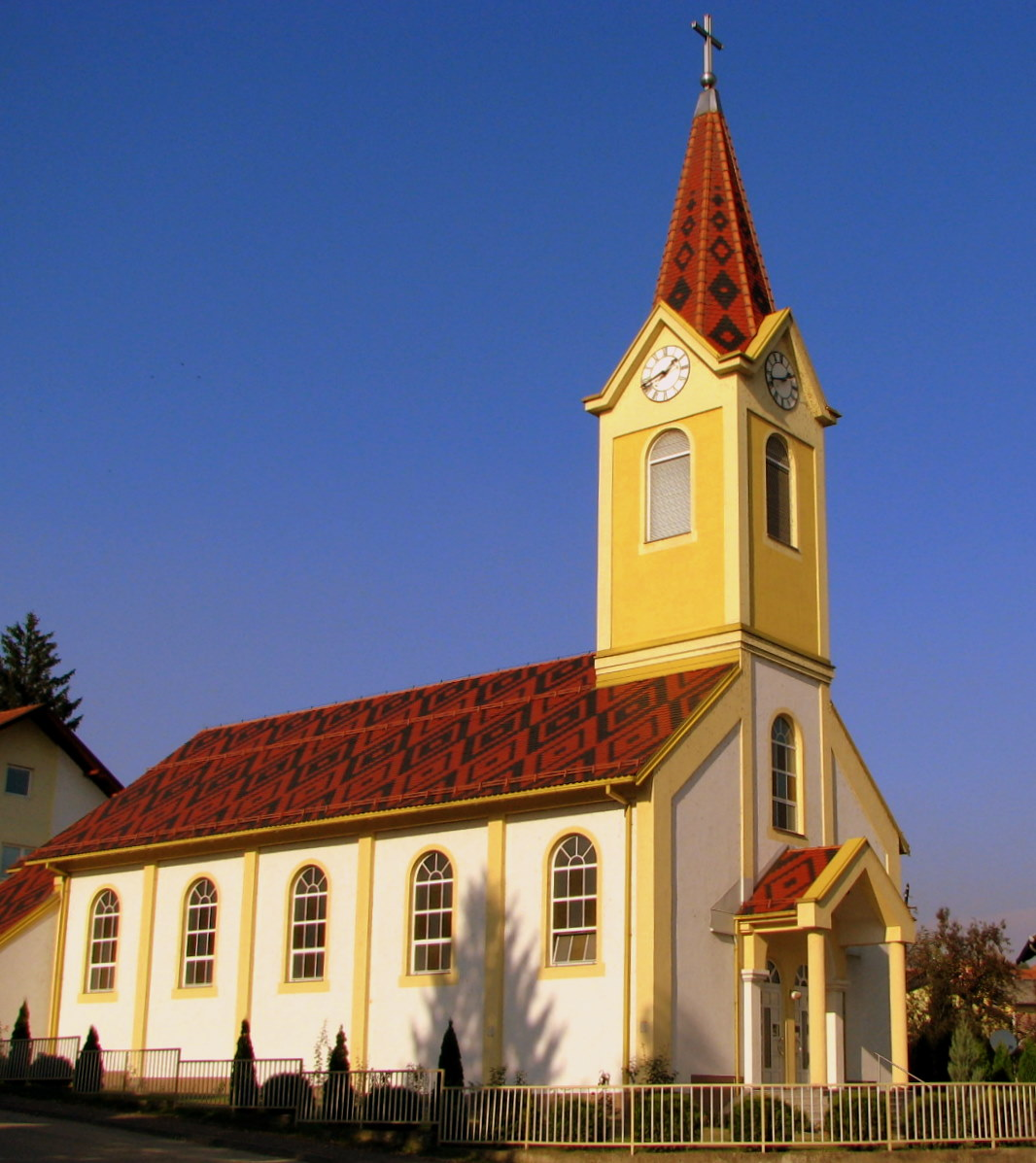
- Sacred Heart Church
- Location: Doboj
- Country: Bosnia and Herzegovina
- Denomination: Roman Catholic

History
- Status: Parish church
- Consecrated: 24 July 2005

Architecture
- Functional status: Active
- Groundbreaking: 2001
- Completed: 2005

Administration
- Archdiocese: Archdiocese of Vrhbosna
- Archdeaconry: Archdeaconry of Plehan
- Deanery: Deanery of Usora
- Parish: Parish of Sacred Heart, Doboj

Clergy
- Archbishop: Vinko Puljić
- Dean: Msgr. Bosiljko Rajić
- Priest: Rev. Josip Senjak

The Sacred Heart Church (Croatian: Crkva Presvetog Srca Isusova) is a Roman Catholic church in Doboj, Bosnia and Herzegovina.
