= Herz Jesu Oberrad =

Church in Frankfurt, Germany

Herz Jesu
- Herz Jesu Oberrad
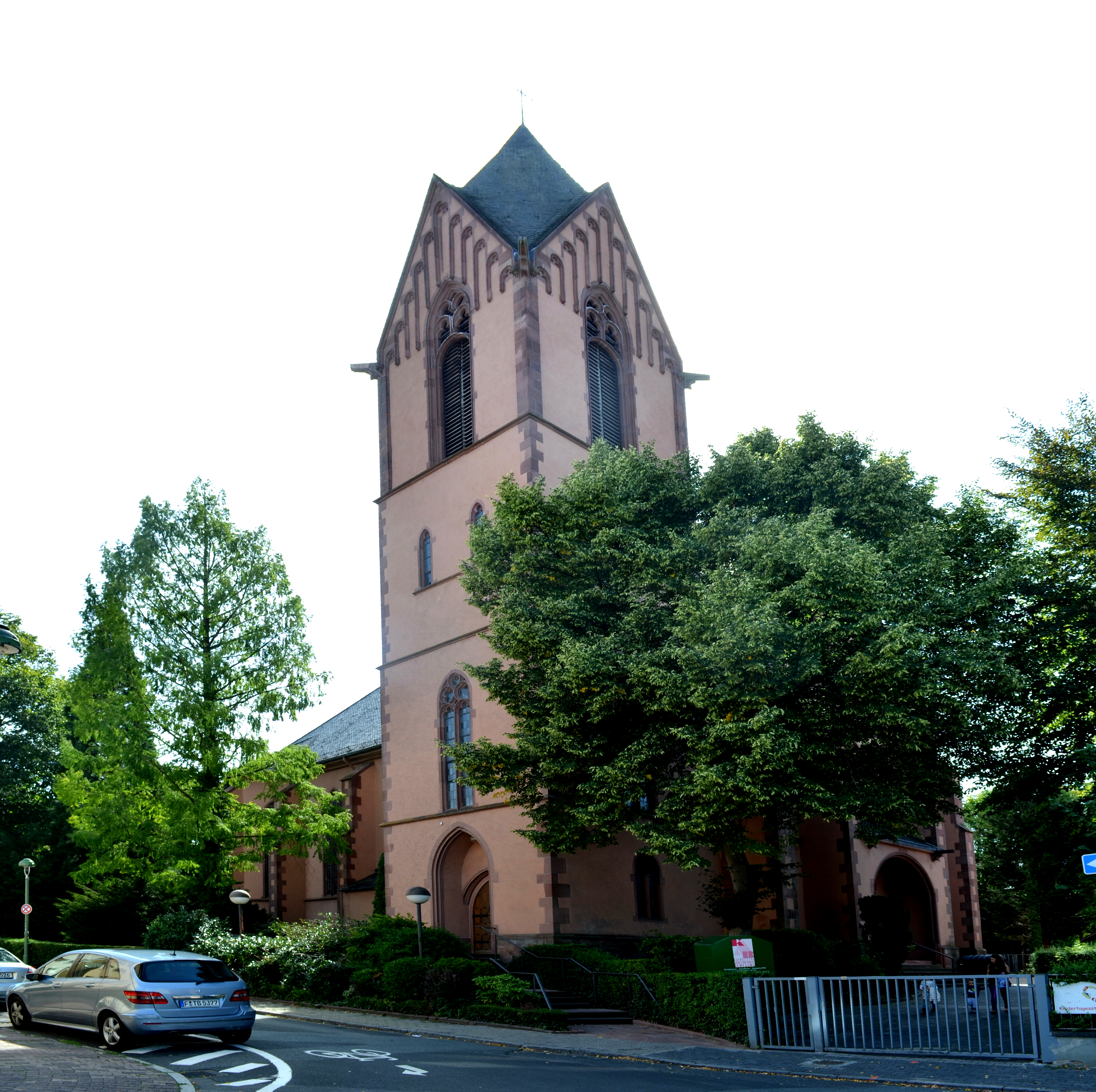
- Exterior

- Location within Hesse Location within Germany
- 50°05′51″N 8°43′18″E
- Location: Oberrad
- Country: Germany
- Denomination: Catholic
- Website: www.bonifatius-ffm.de/index.php/gottesdienst/herz-jesu

History
- Status: church
- Dedication: Sacred Heart

Architecture
- Architect: 4 May 1896
- Style: Gothic revival
- Completed: 1893

Administration
- Diocese: Diocese of Limburg
- Parish: St. Bonifatius Frankfurt

Herz Jesu Oberrad (Sacred Heart, literally: Heart of Jesus, German: Herz-Jesu-Kirche) is a Catholic church in the suburb Oberrad of Frankfurt am Main, Hesse, Germany. The parish church of the Oberrad congregation is part of the Diocese of Limburg. It is a Kirchort (church location), part of the parish St. Bonifatius Frankfurt.

The church was built in 1893 after designs by the architect Max Meckel in Gothic revival style.
