= Università Cattolica del Sacro Cuore Schools =

Università Cattolica del Sacro Cuore Schools (English: Catholic University of the Sacred Heart) are the schools (facoltà) within the Italian university Università Cattolica del Sacro Cuore granting undergraduate and graduate degrees.

== History ==
The Cattolica was founded in 1921. Classes began in Milan, in S.Agnese 2 with two faculties: Social Sciences and Humanities. Over the years other faculties were established, up to the current 12.

== Academics ==
The schools offer Bachelor of Science and Master of Science in different fields. In addition to these, the university runs several double degree programs with other institutions throughout the world. Degrees are offered both in Italian and in English.

== Schools ==
=== School of Agriculture (Piacenza-Cremona) ===
The School was established in 1951. It allows students from the Cattolica University, with the activation of the double degree with Wageningen University, to achieve two qualifications : master's degree in "Economics and management of agro-food system" (Italy) and the Master in "Management, economics and consumer sciences" (Netherlands).

=== School of Banking, Financial and Insurance ===
The School (1990), is the only faculty in Italy focused in the disciplines of banking and finance. The studies can be traced mainly in four areas: general economics, legal, mathematical-statistical and business. In recent years has also granted the degree course "Banking and finance" completely in English.

=== School of Economics ===
The UCSC School of Economics was founded in 1947. It provides for daytime courses but also in the evening, graduate courses in collaboration with other faculties and courses completely taught in English as "Economics" and "International Management". Since the academic year 2000/2001, on the campus of the seat of Rome, in collaboration with the Faculty of Medicine and Surgery has introduced the course "Economics and management of healthcare organizations."

=== School of Economics and Law (Piacenza-Cremona) ===
This school (1990), in addition to the traditional, courses is characterized by the offer of the course "International Management" double degree that allows the students to study 2 years in Piacenza and another 2 years in a foreign university, thereby achieving a double degree.

=== School of Education ===
The School of Education was founded in 1936. Originally was called faculty of teaching; since 1996 takes place a radical transformation and innovation that led to the establishment of the Faculty of Education.

=== School of Language and Literatures ===
UCSC School of Language and Literatures (1991), is characterized by a core educational drive, which leads to the learning of two major European languages: English, French, Russian, Spanish, German, to which is added to the study of Chinese and Arabic for the curriculum in "Language Expert for international relations."

=== School of Law ===
The School of Law is among the first schools set up at Cattolica (1924) and has long been one of the most coveted areas of instruction at the university.

=== School of Letters and Philosophy ===
The School of Letters and Philosophy (1924) is characterized by an offer on teaching science literature (classical and modern), philosophical, historical, artistic and archaeological, communication, cultural heritage and Arts and Entertainment.

=== School of Mathematical, Physical and Natural Sciences (Brescia) ===
This school was founded in 1968 in Brescia. Classes have officially started in 1971 with a degree in "Mathematics", initially with the didactic address, then the ' address application and with the general. In 1997 was launched a degree course in "Physics" with the broad matter physics, environmental physics and physics of biosystems. In 2000 it was set up the new home of the Good Shepherd in Via dei Musei 41, characterized by new spaces for teaching, research and new laboratories of Computer Science and Physics, including the laboratories of Physics of Matter, prepared with the contribution of the National Institute for the Physics of Matter.

=== School of Medicine "Agostino Gemelli" (Rome) ===
The medical school (1958) is affiliated to the Agostino Gemelli University Polyclinic and also manages the John Paul II Foundation for Research and Treatment in Campobasso. In view of the introduction of a course of medicine completely in English, the teaching faculty teamed with University of Pittsburgh.

=== School of Political and Social Sciences ===
This school was founded in 1926. Originally was called "school of political and social sciences", which became in 1931 "faculty of political science, economics and trade", and in 1936 becomes the "Political Science Department".

=== School of Psychology ===
This school, founded in 1999, had its origin when Agostino Gemelli founded in 1924, the institute of psychology and biology characterized by innovative research tools for the time. In 1958, the lab became a school of psychology and the psychology department in 1983. Ten years later, in 1993, the Faculty of Education puts the undergraduate degree in psychology in 1999 from where it will evolve in the faculty of psychology.
