= Church of the Sacred Heart of Jesus, Węgierki =

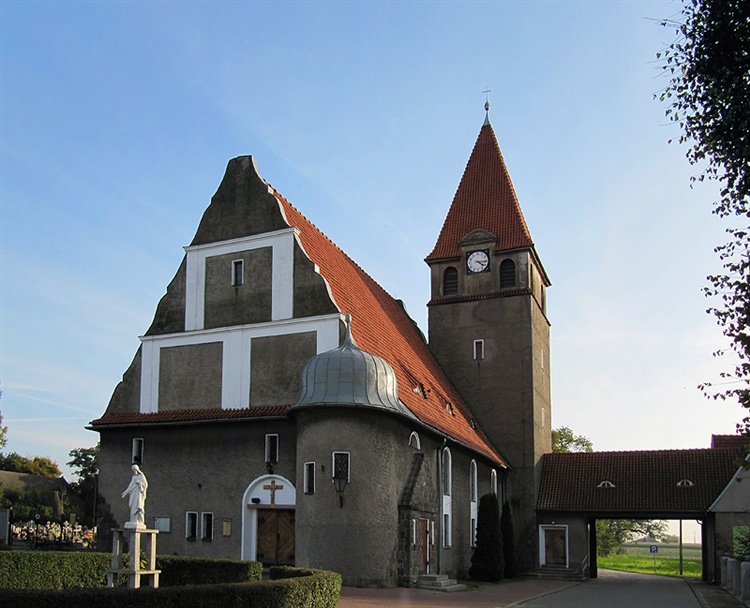
- Church of the Sacred Heart of Jesus, Węgierki
- Church of the Sacred Heart of Jesus, Węgierki
- 52°19′19″N 17°40′22″E
- Location: Węgierki
- Country: Poland
- Denomination: Catholic
- Churchmanship: Roman

History
- Dedication: Sacred Heart of Jesus
- Consecrated: 9 October 1997

Architecture
- Completed: 1907

The Church of the Sacred Heart of Jesus, Węgierki, is a Roman Catholic church in Węgierki, Września County, Poland.

== History ==
The church was built between 1904 and 1907 by the followers of the Evangelical Augsburg Church. It was taken over by the Catholics after World War II. The dedication of the church took place on 16 May 1946. The parish was founded on 1 October 1969. The consecration of the church took place on 9 October 1997. A square tower was built on the side of the triangle-gabled nave. The nave is covered with a pyramid-shape roof. In the corner of the nave is a cylindrical extension constituting the staircase to the choir. The roof of the temple is covered with tiles. Next to the church is a cemetery.

== Gallery ==
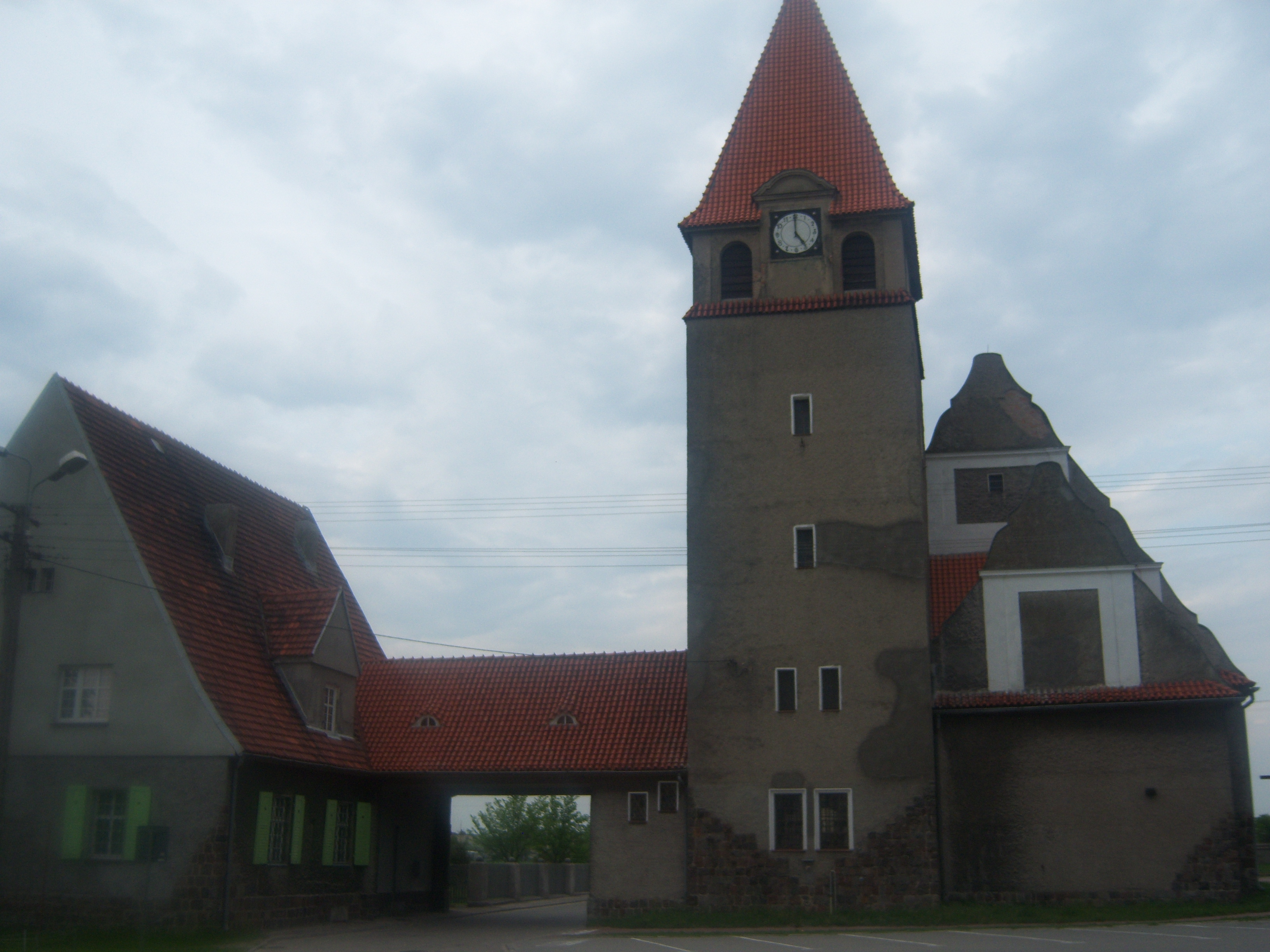
View of church from the parking

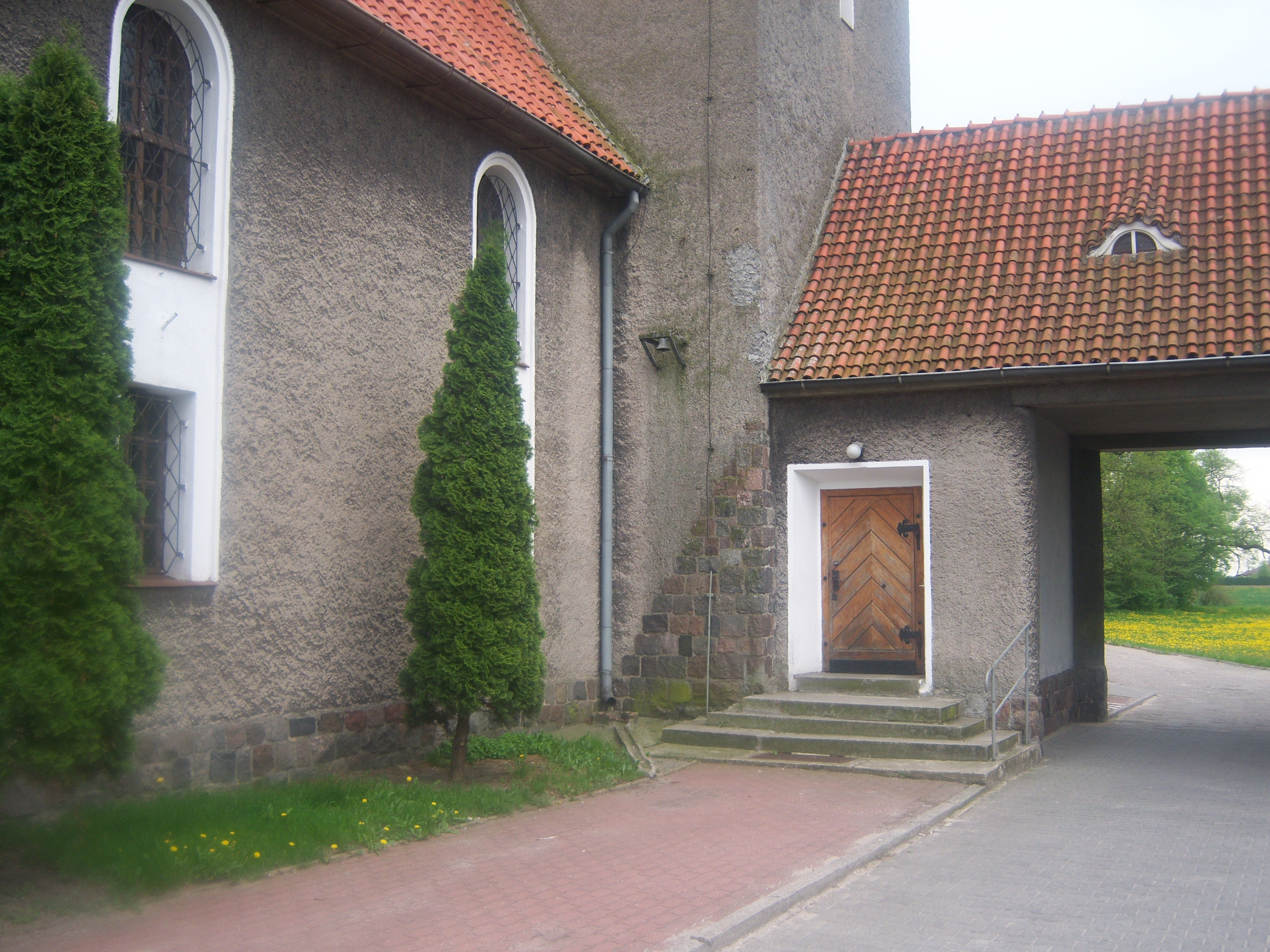
The nave of the church

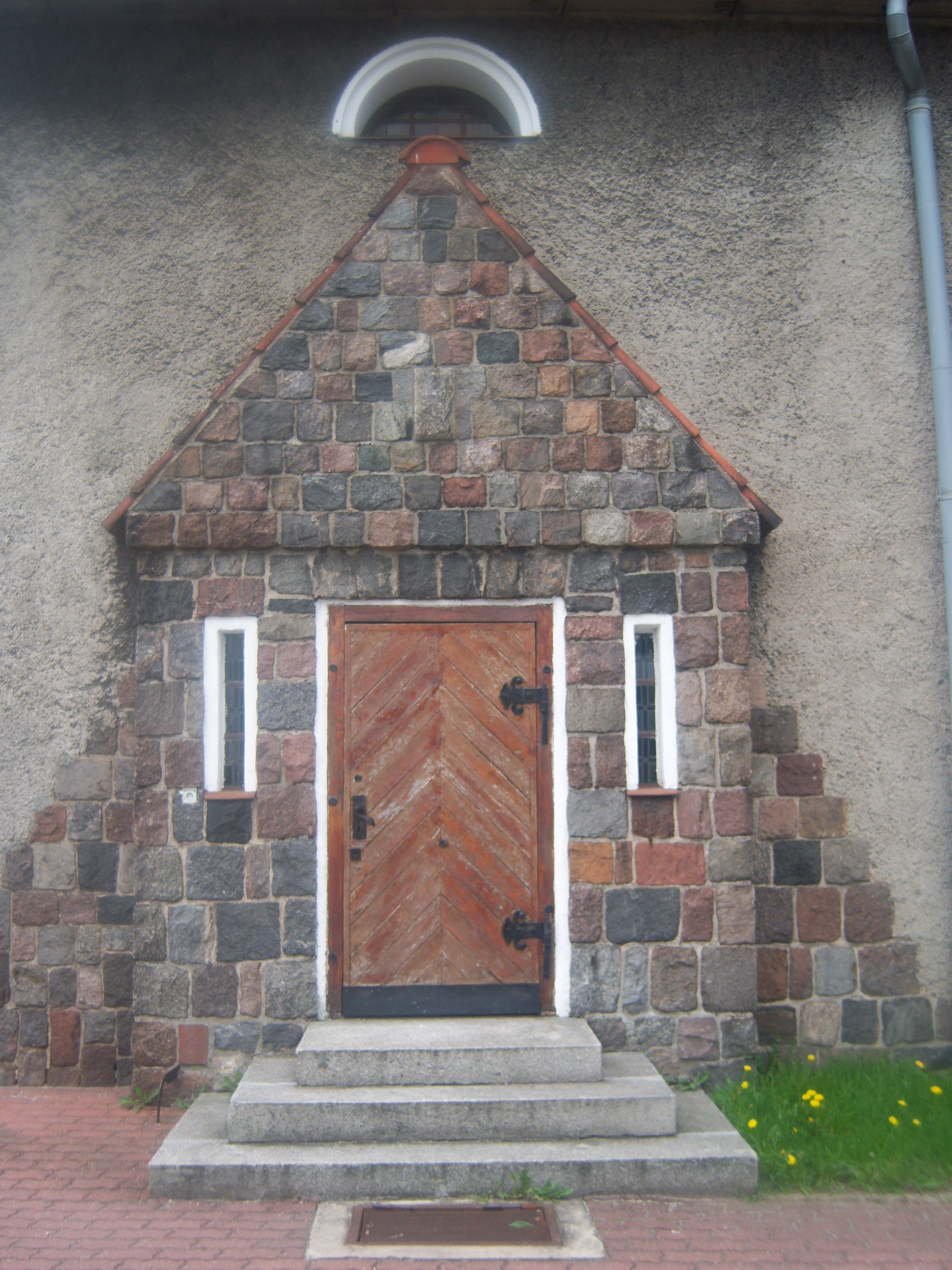
The entrance to the galleries

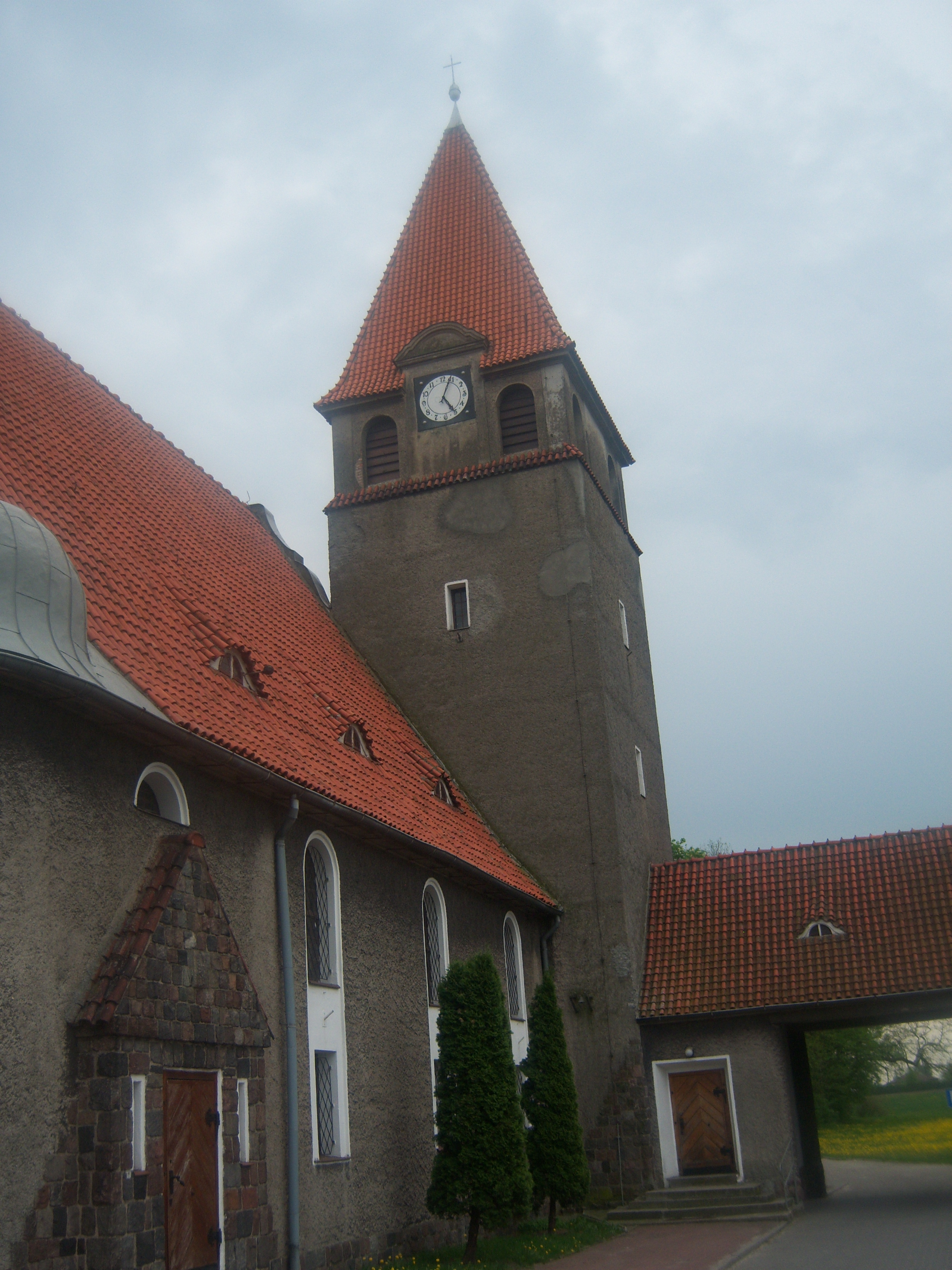
Rectangular temple tower hipped roof covered

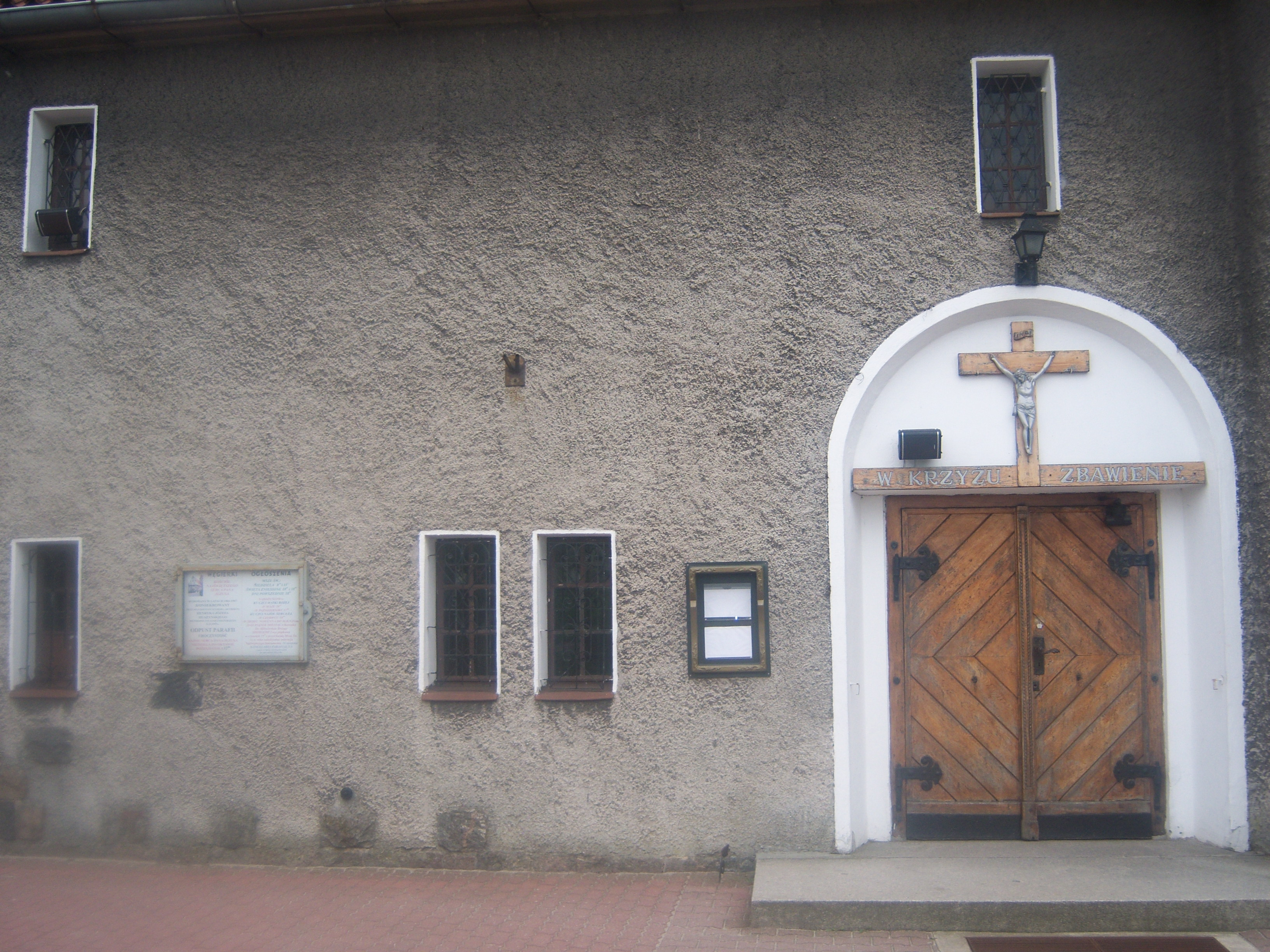
Porch of the temple

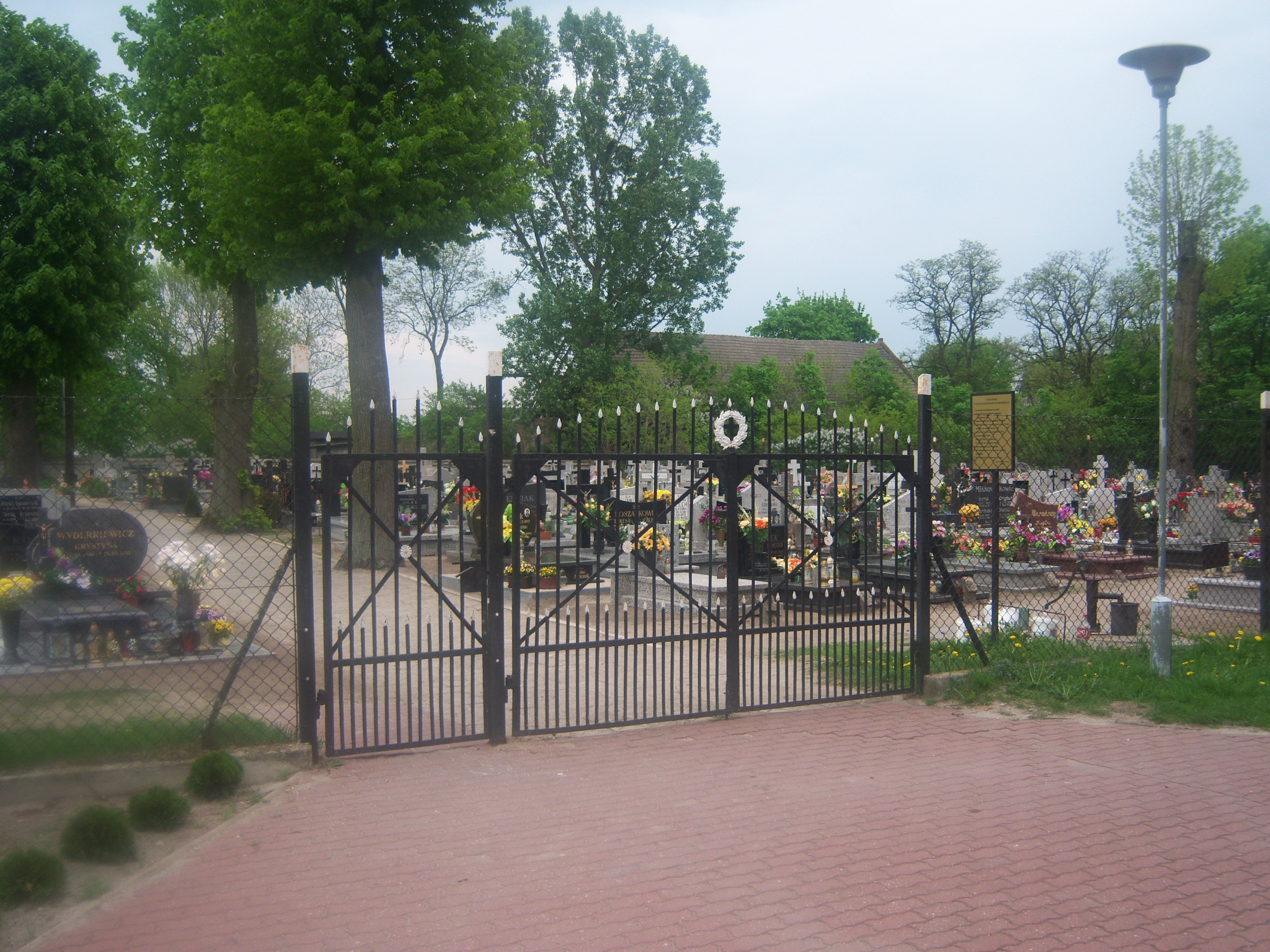
The cemetery near the church

== See also ==
- Christian Church
- Roman Catholicism
- Roman Catholicism in Poland

== Bibliography ==
- (in Polish) Obiekty sakralne - Kościół pw. Najświętszego Serca Pana Jezusa
- (in Polish) Archidiecezja Gnieźnieńska - Kościół pw. Najświętszego Serca Pana Jezusa
