= Church of the Sacred Heart, Oola =

Church of the Sacred Heart
- Eaglais an Chroí Rónaofa
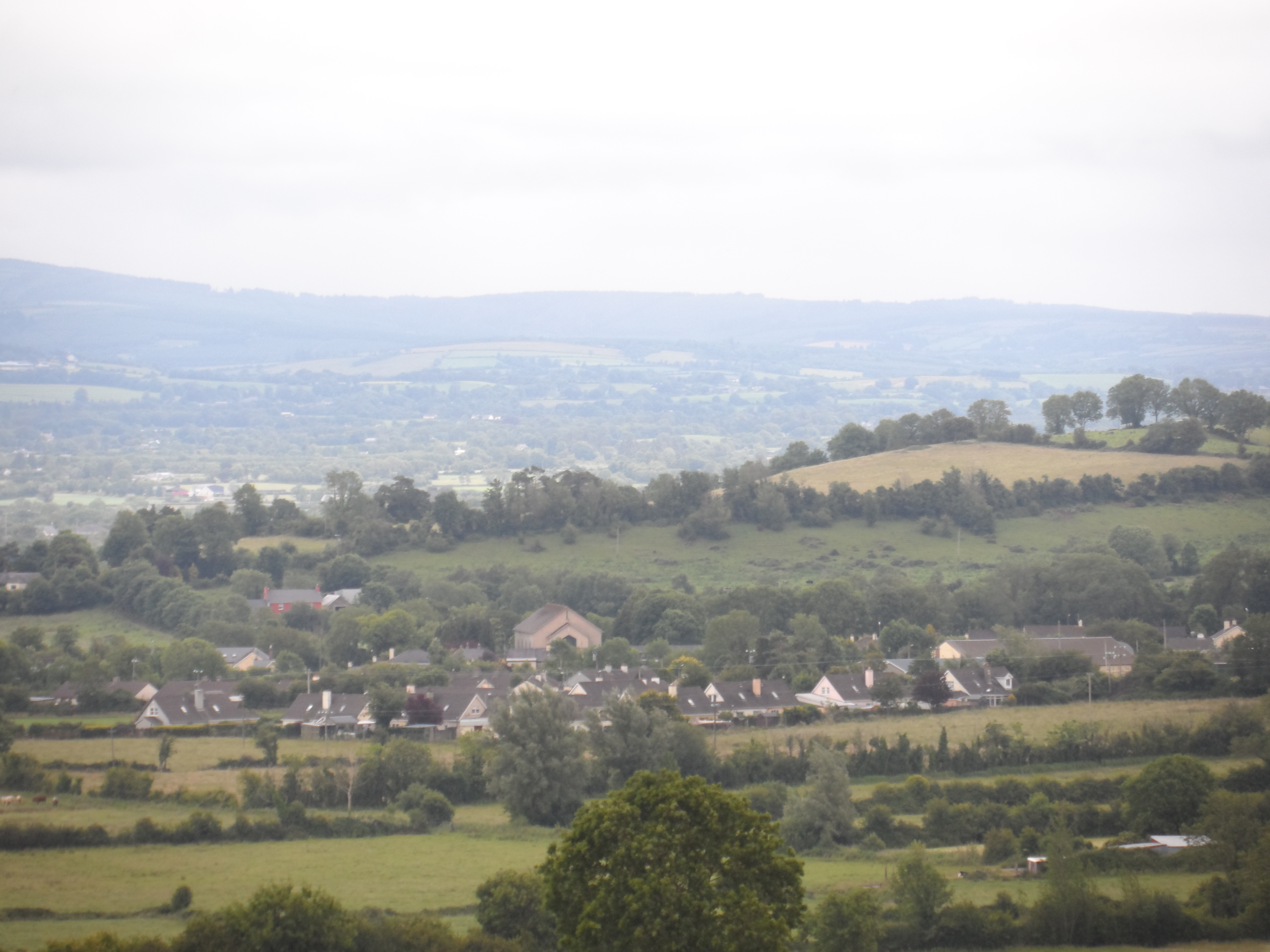
- View of Oola from the south; the church is the yellow building at centre.

- Location within Ireland
- 52°31′52″N 8°15′40″W
- Location: Moanoola, Oola, County Limerick
- Country: Ireland
- Denomination: Catholic
- Churchmanship: Roman Rite

History
- Dedication: Sacred Heart

Architecture
- Functional status: active
- Style: Vernacular
- Completed: 1838

Specifications
- Length: 33 m (108 ft)
- Width: 14 m (46 ft)
- Materials: limestone, slate, cast iron, stained glass

Administration
- Archdiocese: Cashel and Emly
- Deanery: Tipperary
- Parish: Solohead & Oola

The Church of the Sacred Heart is an 1838 Catholic church in Oola, Ireland.

== Location ==
The Church of the Sacred Heart is located in the middle of Oola village on the N24 road, to the southeast of Oola's national school.

== History ==
A thatched Catholic church existed at Ballyfirreen before 1752. The Church of the Sacred Heart was built in 1838.

In 2022 some money was stolen from a donation box in the church.

== Building ==
The Church of the Sacred Heart is a freestanding gable-fronted barn-style church. The altar is made of marble.
