= Sacred Heart Church (Sharon, Pennsylvania) =

- Church of the Sacred Heart

- Location within Pennsylvania
- 41°13′57.15″N 80°30′50.48″W
- Location: 40 South Irvine Avenue Sharon, Pennsylvania,
- Country: United States of America
- Denomination: Roman Catholic

History
- Status: Church
- Founded: 1864
- Dedication: Sacred Heart of Jesus

Architecture
- Functional status: Closed
- Groundbreaking: 1864
- Closed: Merged: February 13, 2017 Closed: March 25, 2018

Administration
- Diocese: Roman Catholic Diocese of Erie

Clergy
- Pastor: Rev. Henry C. Andrae

Sacred Heart Church, or the Church of the Sacred Heart, as it was officially known, was a Roman Catholic church located at 40 South Irvine Avenue in Sharon, Pennsylvania. It was a part of the Diocese of Erie.

== History ==
=== Brief history (1850s–2016) ===
The history of Sacred Heart Church and Catholicism in Sharon, Pennsylvania begins in the early 1850s, when the first Catholic settlers moved to the Shenango Valley area. These first settlers attended services in Mercer, Pennsylvania and Hickory Corners, now located in Hermitage, Pennsylvania. The priests who were in charge of the services at Hickory Corners held the occasional service at the homes of early Catholic families in Sharon. The occasional services continued in this manner until the arrival of Reverend John J. O'Keeffe, who is considered to be the first resident pastor in Sharon. Father O'Keeffe commissioned the building of a pastoral residence, located south of where the current church is. One of the rooms within residence was used as a church until the mid-1860s, when it was decided that a proper church should be built.

In 1864, the cornerstone of Sacred Heart Church was laid in a ceremony, on a lot that was donated by J.M. Irvine, on the corner of State Street and Irvine Avenue on the West Hill of Sharon. It was the first Catholic church in Sharon. After a few additions, most notably the bell tower in 1867, the basement was used as a parochial school until a dedicated school building was built in 1889. The first teachers in the parish were the Sisters of the Holy Humility of Mary. In 1892, the church purchased the Peter Kimberly mansion and the land surrounding it, which is located across from the church. Portions of this parcel were sold as building lots for new homes, which gave the church $10,000. After the purchase of the Kimberly Mansion, the Sisters of the Holy Humility of Mary left after they had failed to establish a foundation in the Diocese of Erie that was requested by the Bishop Tobias Mullen. They were replaced by the Benedictine Sisters of Erie, who occupied the mansion.

A new brown-brick rectory was built on Irvine Avenue in 1900. During the Great Depression, in 1932, a $75,000 improvement program was announced for the church. This program included an extensive alteration to the front of the church and vestibule(including the addition of the current stonework on the church), new ceilings, new windows, a new sanctuary, a new sacristy, and the conversion of the basement into a social center with two dining rooms, a new kitchen, updated restrooms, and a furnace room. Also, the rectory was enlarged and remodeled. in 1935, Reverend James Murphy was appointed the pastor of Sacred Heart Church, and was named a monsignor in 1947.

In 1958, Father Murphy broke ground on a new $450,000 parochial school south of North State Line Road, on the land of the former John Stevenson estate, which the church had purchased, along with the mansion. The new school opened in 1959 with 550 students enrolled. With the new and more modern educational facility opened and a greater need for parking, the former school was razed. If it were around today, it would be located in the current church parking lot. In 1970, Father Murphy retired and Father Donald Scully was named pastor. A fire broke out in the church in 1977. However, the swift action of the Sharon Fire Department kept the damage to a minimum. Because of declining enrollment, Sacred Heart School held its last classes in 1984. When fire destroyed the neighboring First Methodist Church in 1987, the school was used as a church until they could build a new one.

In 1995, Father Daniel Kresinski took over as pastor. In May 1997, the school was sold to the Brookfield Local School District, where it operated as Brookfield Elementary School until a new schooling complex was built in 2011. In 2001, Father Kresinski was reassigned to another parish and was replaced by Father Stanley Swatcha. Father Swatcha was reassigned to another parish and was replaced by Father Henry Andrae in 2008, who made many attempts to revitalize the parish.

=== Merger, closure, and possible sale (2016–present) ===
Interior of the church in 2015

In the late half of the twentieth century, demographic shifts had an effect on Sacred Heart Church and much of the Shenango Valley. Declining populations and decreased mass attendance hurt many of the churches in the area, which left Sacred Heart Church with a fraction of its former membership. In 2016, Bishop Lawrence Persico had decided changes needed to be made because of the demographic shifts, as he believed that, "the care of the souls for the faithful of Sharon could be better served by a single territorial parish..."

On April 14, 2016, Bishop Persico announced preliminary plans to merge Sacred Heart Church into Saint Joseph's Church. This was met with anger and disappointment from the parishioners of Sacred Heart. During the next few months, the Diocese of Erie took feedback from members of the pastors and parishioners of both parishes. With the new feedback, an official decree was released on September 16, 2016, officially announcing the merger that would become effective on February 13, 2017. At that time, Sacred Heart Church, along with its assets and all sacramental records, would be merged and subsumed into Saint Joseph Parish, becoming a secondary church of Saint Joseph Parish and remaining open for worship occasionally.

However, after Sacred Heart Church merged with Saint Joseph Parish, Sacred Heart Church would only open once for a mass on the solemnity of the church's namesake(Feast of the Sacred Heart), which occurred on June 23, 2017. After the mass, rumors began to circulate on how long the church would remain open as a secondary parish. The pastor of Saint Joseph Parish, Father Thomas Whitman, appeared in a parish bulletin asking Bishop Persico for permission to completely close Sacred Heart Parish, citing nearby arson and vandalism, though the legitimacy of these reasons was challenged by former parishioners of Sacred Heart. His request was granted in a decree published on March 12, 2018. The changes would take effect on March 25, 2018. Not long after the request was granted, the building was showing signs that it was to be put up for sale. The blessing of the building was removed and all sacred objects were removed from the premises, leaving many former parishioners (mainly the families who donated the stained glass windows) wondering where they were. In a comment on an article about Sacred Heart Parish to the Sharon Herald newspaper, pastor of Saint Joseph Parish, Father Whitman stated, "People should not be wondering where the stained-glass windows are; we've had information about that in the church bulletin(no evidence of this was found). If they came to mass on Sunday, they would know all about it." This comment left many former parishioners of Sacred Heart and some parishioners of Saint Joseph enraged. Soon after this article was published, Sacred Heart Parish, its parking lot, and rectory was found on the website for Northwood Realty Services, confirming what was long rumored, for $395,000. As of July 2018, a buyer has not been found and the future of the church remains a mystery.

== Pastors ==
Throughout its lengthy history, many priests have had the opportunity to be the pastor of Sacred Heart Church.

- The Reverend Father John O'Keeffe (1859–1871)
- The Reverend Father Kiernan O'Brannigan (1871–1888)
- The Reverend Father James Brennan (1888–1901)
- ***Unknown*** (1901–1935)
- The Reverend Monsignor James Murphy (1935–1970)
- The Reverend Father Donald Scully (1970–1995)
- The Reverend Father Daniel Kresinski (1995–2001)
- The Reverend Father Stanley Swatcha (2001–2008)
- The Reverend Father Henry C. Andrae (2008–2017)
