= Sacred Heart Church (Staten Island) =

Coordinates: 40°38′6.29″N 74°6′53.68″W

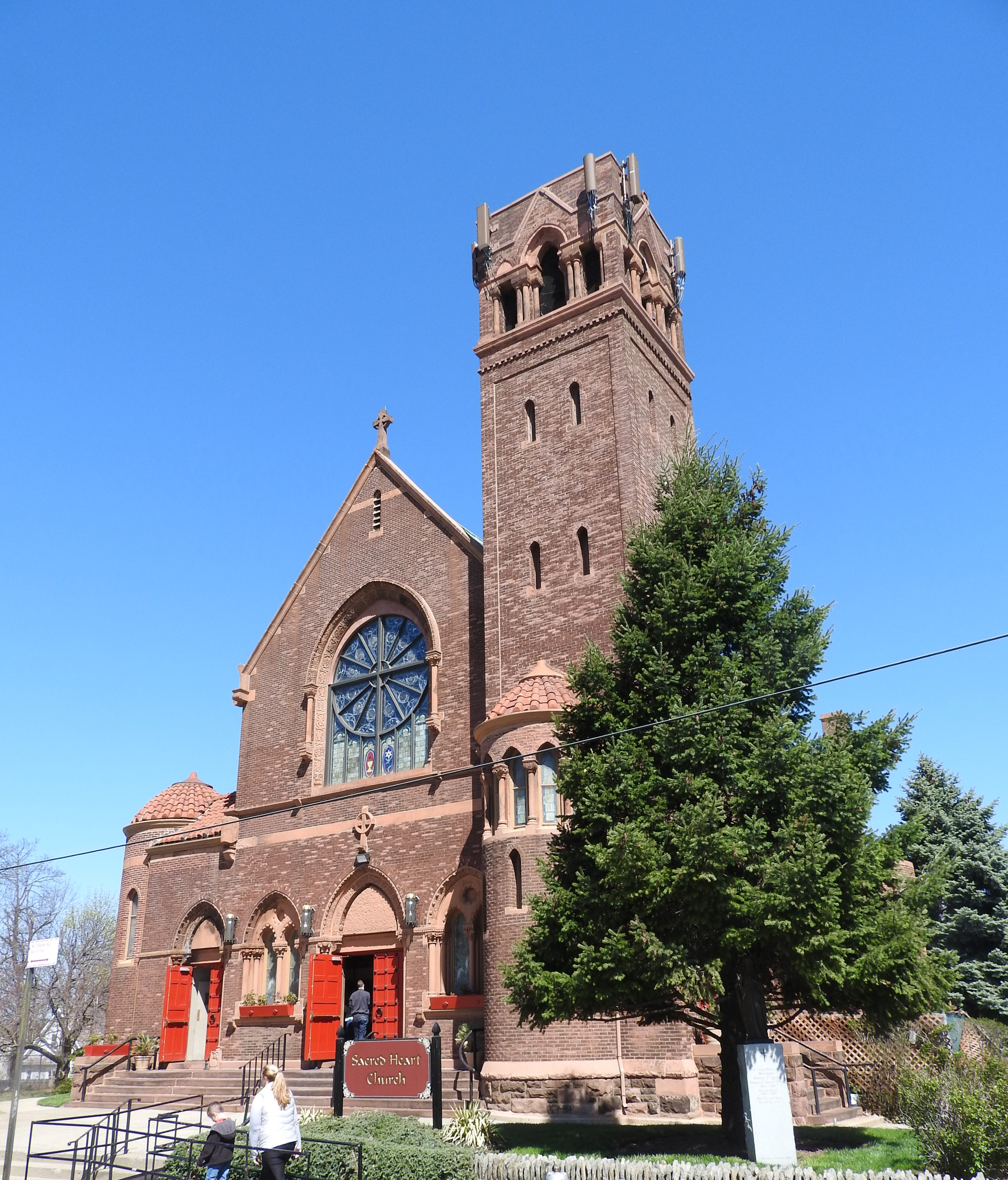
- Sacred Heart Church
- Location: 981 Castleton Avenue; Staten Island, New York
- Country: United States
- Denomination: Roman Catholic
- Website: sacredheartsi.org

History
- Status: Parish church
- Founded: July 1875 (parish)

Architecture
- Functional status: Active
- Completed: 1900

Administration
- Archdiocese: New York
- Parish: Sacred Heart

Clergy
- Pastor: Reverend Eric Rapaglia

The Church of the Sacred Heart is a Roman Catholic parish church under the authority of the Roman Catholic Archdiocese of New York, located in Staten Island, New York City. The parish was established in 1875. After much financial difficulty, the church building was gradually renovated and extended to cater to the growing congregation and finished in 1900. The affiliated parish elementary school and the Schoenstatt "Shrine of Light" are located across Castleton Avenue.
