= Sacré Cœur =

Sacré Cœur (or Sacré Coeur) is French for Sacred Heart. It may refer to:

== Places ==
- Sacré-Coeur, Quebec, a municipality in Canada
- Sacré-Cœur-de-Crabtree, now known as Crabtree, Quebec, a municipality in Canada
- Sacré-Cœur-de-Jésus, Quebec, a municipality in Canada
- Mermoz-Sacré-Cœur, a commune d'arrondissement in the city of Dakar, Senegal

== Institutions ==
- Sacré-Cœur, Paris, a Roman Catholic church and minor basilica in Paris, France
- Hôpital du Sacré-Cœur de Montréal, a hospital in Montreal, Quebec, Canada

=== Schools ===
- Sacré Cœur School, a school in Glen Iris, a South Eastern suburb of Melbourne, Victoria, Australia
- Collège du Sacré-Coeur (Egypt), a Catholic school located in Cairo, Egypt
- École secondaire du Sacré-Cœur, a French language catholic secondary school in Greater Sudbury, Ontario, Canada
- Institution du Sacré-Cœur, a Catholic school in Port-au-Prince, Haiti

== See also ==
- Sacred Heart (disambiguation)
- Sacro Cuore (disambiguation)
