= Basilica of the Sacred Heart of Jesus, Pondicherry =

Coordinates: 11.92626°N 79.82704°E

Sacred Heart of Jesus Basilica, Pondicherry
- பரிசுத்த இருதய ஆண்டவர் தேவாலயம், புதுச்சேரி Basilique du Sacré-Cœur de Jésus de Pondichéry
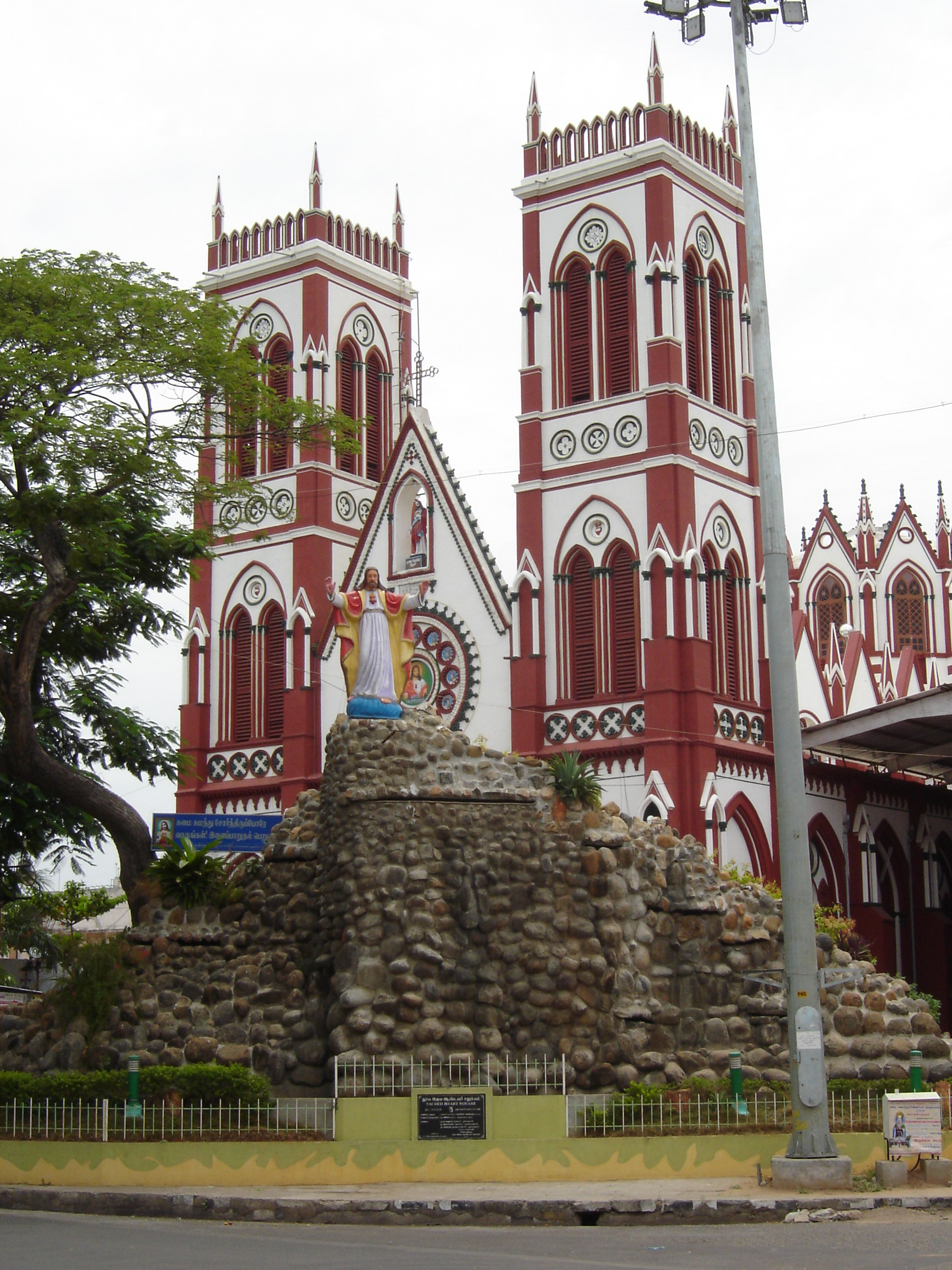
- Basilica's view from Sacred Heart Square

- Sacred Heart Basilica
- Location: Pondicherry, Puducherry
- Country: India
- Denomination: Catholic
- Website: sacredheartpondy.org

History
- Status: Minor Basilica and Parish church
- Dedication: Sacred Heart of Jesus
- Consecrated: 17 December 1907
- Events: Elevation to Basilica: 2 September 2011

Architecture
- Functional status: Active
- Architect: Rev. Fr. Telesphore Welter
- Architectural type: Basilica
- Style: Neo-Gothic
- Groundbreaking: 1902
- Completed: 1907

Specifications
- Capacity: 2000
- Length: 50 m (160 ft)
- Width: 48 m (157 ft)
- Height: 18 m (59 ft)
- Materials: Brick

Administration
- Archdiocese: Archdiocese of Pondicherry and Cuddalore
- Parish: Sacred Heart Parish

Clergy
- Archbishop: Msgr. Francis Kalist
- Rector: Rev.Fr. S. Kulandaisamy

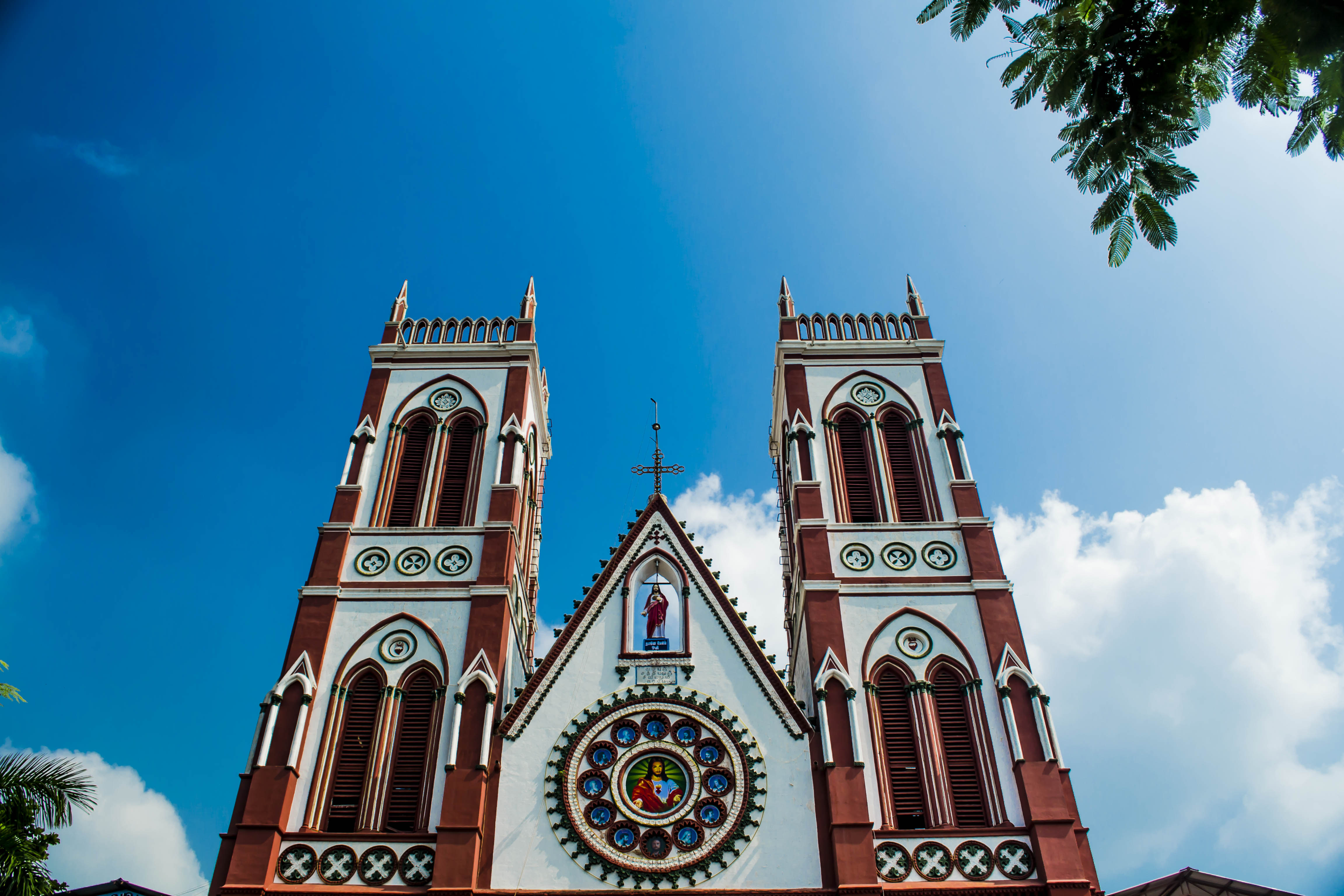
The Front View

Basilica of the Sacred Heart of Jesus (Tamil: பரிசுத்த இருதய ஆண்டவர் தேவாலயம், French: Basilique du Sacré-Cœur de Jésus de Pondichéry) is a Roman Catholic minor basilica situated on the south boulevard of Pondicherry in Puducherry, India, and is an oriental specimen of Gothic Revival architecture. It contains rare stained glass panels depicting events from the life of Christ and saints of the Catholic Church. In recent years it has become one of the famous pilgrimage spots for Christians.

== History ==
In the year 1895, the then Archbishop Mgr. Gandy consecrated the Archdiocese of Pondicherry to the Sacred Heart of Jesus. He wished to build a new church in devotion of Sacred Heart of Jesus. Rev. Fr. Telesphore Welter, the parish priest of Nellithope prepared the building plan and parish priest of Cathedral Rev. Fr. Fourcaud commenced the construction of the new church in 1902 at the southern side of Pondicherry.

The blessing of the church and the first mass was held at the western wing of the present church by Mgr. Gandy on 17, December 1907 and the new parish surrounding this church has been established on 27, January 1908.

=== Centenary celebrations ===
The year 2008-2009 was celebrated as centenary year of founding of the parish. A special postal stamp and postal envelope were released to mark the valedictory function of the centenary celebrations.

=== Elevation to Basilica status ===
Papal Decree of Elevation to Minor Basilica

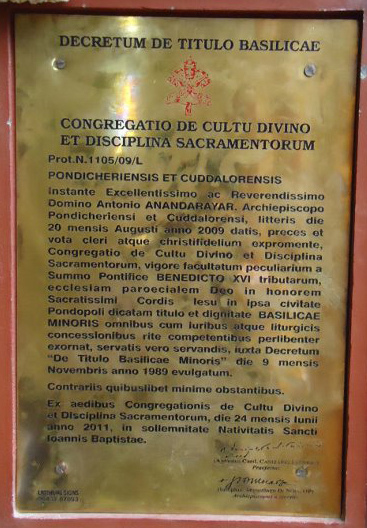
in Latin

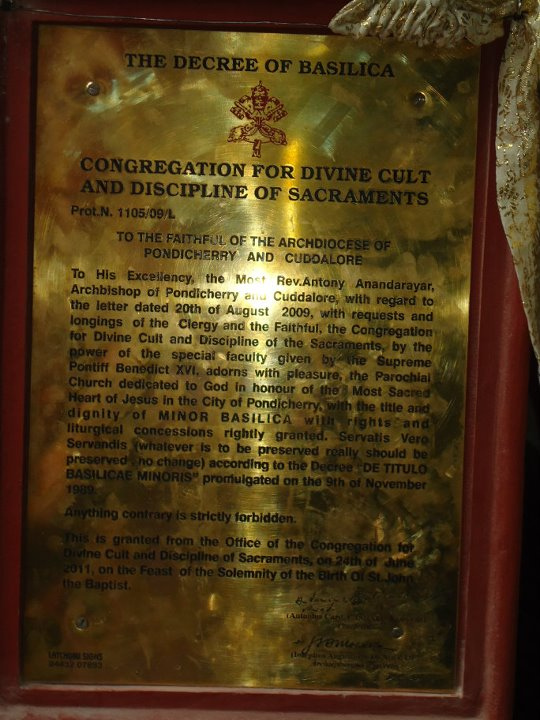
in English

These degrees are inscribed near the main entrance of the basilica above the stoups

At the end of the Centenary Celebrations in June 2009, a request was placed through Telesphore Toppo, President of CBCI, to the Holy See for the elevation of this church to a Basilica.

The Holy See granted the status of minor basilica to the church, with a papal brief dated Friday 24 June 2011. This news arrived on Friday, 29 July 2011, to the Archbishop's residence. The new status of the basilica was officially announced by Mgr. Antony Anandarayar, Archbishop of Pondicherry and Cuddalore on 29 July 2011. The Papal Nuncio to India, Salvatore Pennacchio (Titular Archbishop of Montemarano) visited the basilica on 2 September 2011, and officially declared the church as a basilica in the name of the Holy See. At present, the basilica is headed by Rector Rev. Fr. S. Maria Joseph.

== Structure ==
This 100 years old historical church is 50 m long, 48 m wide and 18 m high with Latin rite cross shape in aerial view is in Gothic style. 24 main columns hold the structure. The biblical verse from 2 Chronicles 7:16 is written above the entrance door in Latin "sanctificavi locum istum, ut sit nomen meum ibi" which means "I have consecrated this house, that my name may be there forever. My eyes and my heart will be there forever.". Inside the church there are glass pictures of 28 saints who were related to the devotion of Sacred Heart of Jesus.

This 100-year-old church has been led by twenty parish priests. The Grotto for Our Lady of Lourdes, Parish Hall, Adoration chapel and the new parish community hall were some of the development of this church since the 1960s. After the arrival of parish priest Thomas in 2005 the church was fully renovated inside and out.

Statues of the four evangelists were erected, beneath which there are four lamp posts describing their lives and the inviting Jesus and the twelve apostles on the front facade. The Grotto for Sacred Heart of Jesus facing the City Railway Station were added and the church illuminated inside and out with chandeliers, focus and flood lights.

== Mass Timings ==
=== Daily Mon-Sat Mass Timings ===
- 06.00Am - Tamil Mass
- 12Noon - Tamil Mass
- 06.00Pm - Tamil Mass

=== 1st Friday Special ===
- 10.30Am - Adoration, Eucharistic Blessing & Tamil Mass.

=== Sunday Mass Timings ===
- 05.30Am - Tamil Mass
- 07.30Am - Tamil Mass
- 12Noon - Tamil Mass
- 05.00Pm - English Mass
- 06.15Pm - Tamil Mass

=== Night Mass Timings ===
11.30PM on

- New Year Night Mass
- Easter Night Mass
- Christmas Night Mass

== Leadership ==
The former parish priests of this church are:

=== Parish priests ===
- T. Welter (1902–1909)
- A. Combes (1909–1910)
- A. Deniaud (1911–1917)
- A. Leblanc (1917–1924)
- L.C. Renoux (1925)
- P.M. Planat (1925–1931)
- H. Gaston (1937–1945)
- L. Peyroutet (1945–1947)
- A. Olasail (1947–1953)
- S. Valanganny (1954–1956)
- M. Abel (1956–1963)
- P. Irudayam (1963–1972)
- G. Raja (1972–1980)
- I. Gnanamanikam (1980–1982)
- P. Gnanapragasam (1982–1988)
- P. P. Xavier (1988–1989)
- A. Mariasusai (1988–1989)
- L. Maguimey (1989–1996)
- G. Jacob (1996–2005)
- A.Thomas (2005-2012)
- S.Maria Joseph (2012–2019)
- S. Kulandaiswamy (2019–2023)
- S.Pitchaimuthu (2023-Present)

=== Rectors ===
- A. Thomas (2005- May 2012)
- S. Maria Joseph ( June 2012- June 2019)
- S. Kulandaiswamy ( June 2019 – 2023)
- S.Pitchaimuthu (2023-Present)

== Gallery ==
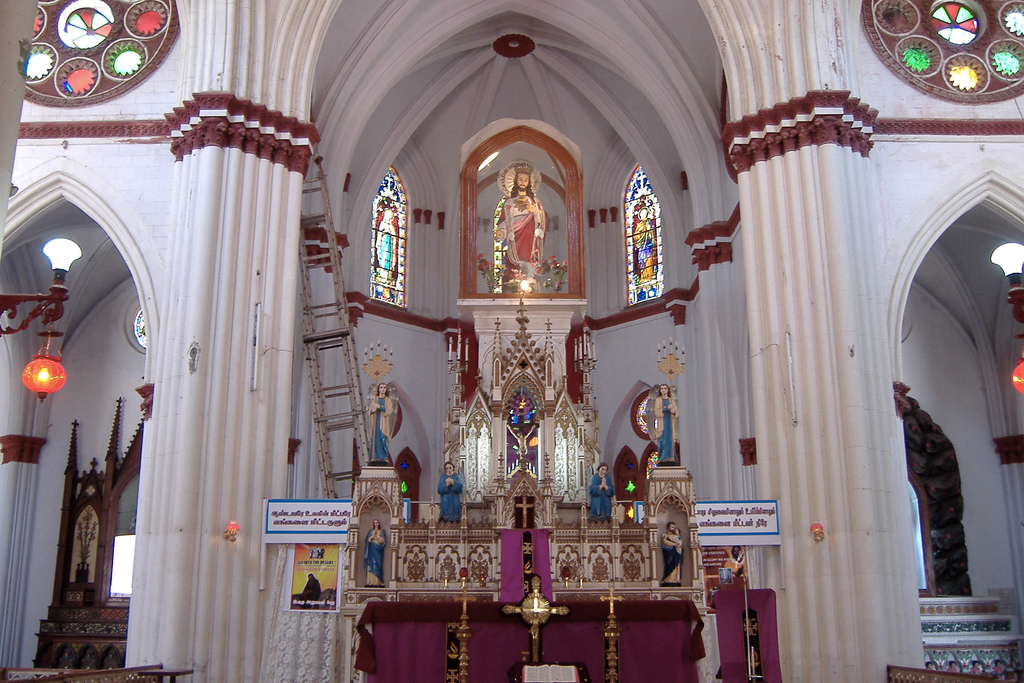
Central high altar - Before renovation

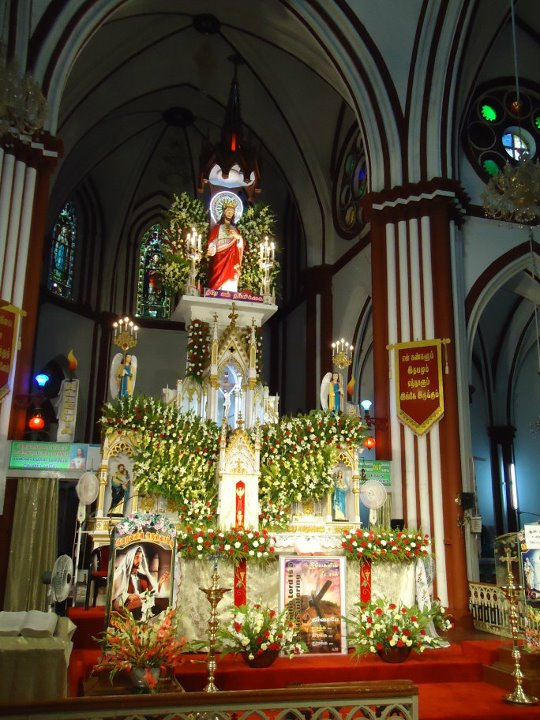
Central high altar - After renovation

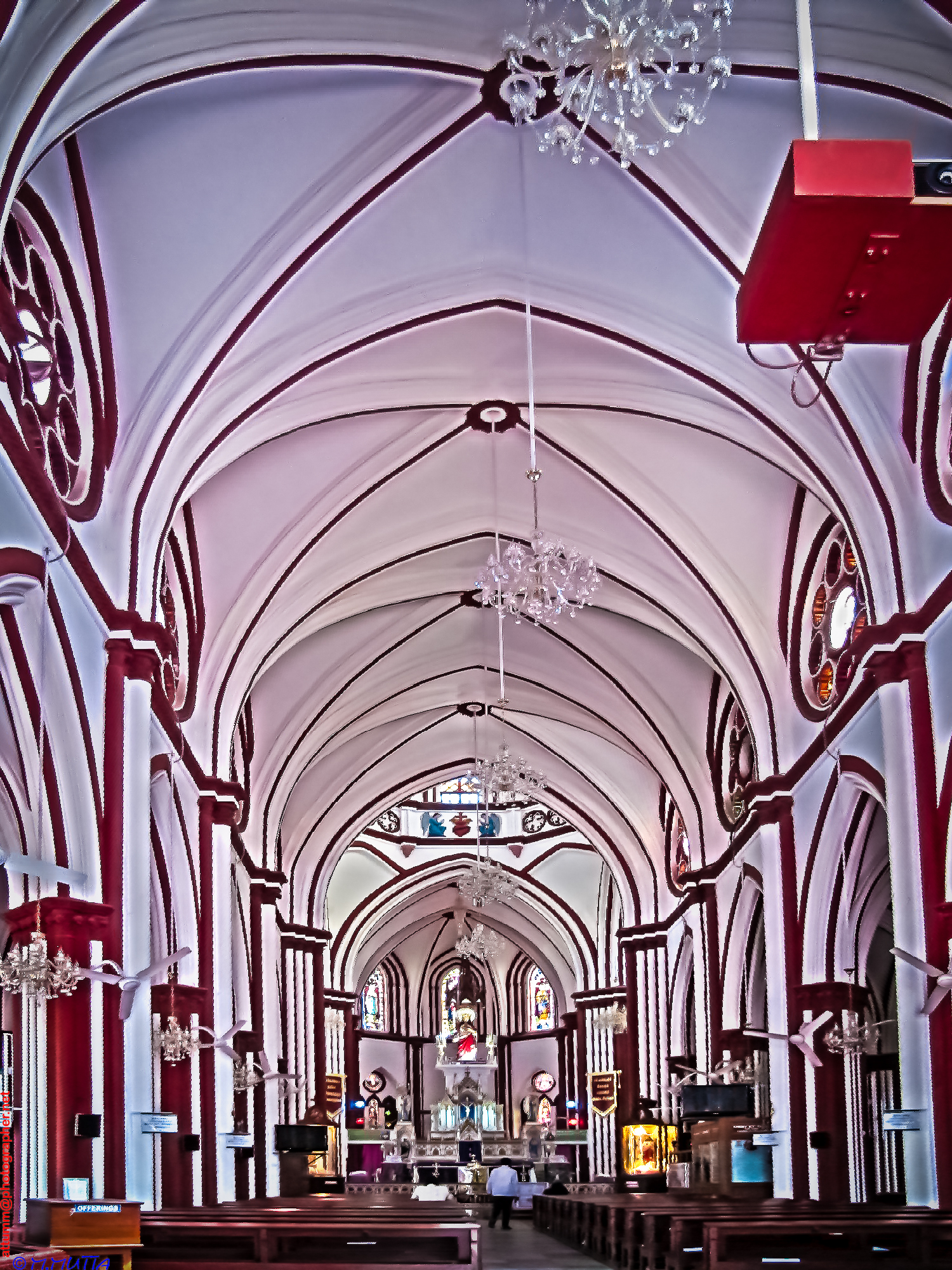
Basilica of Sacred Heart Church - Interior

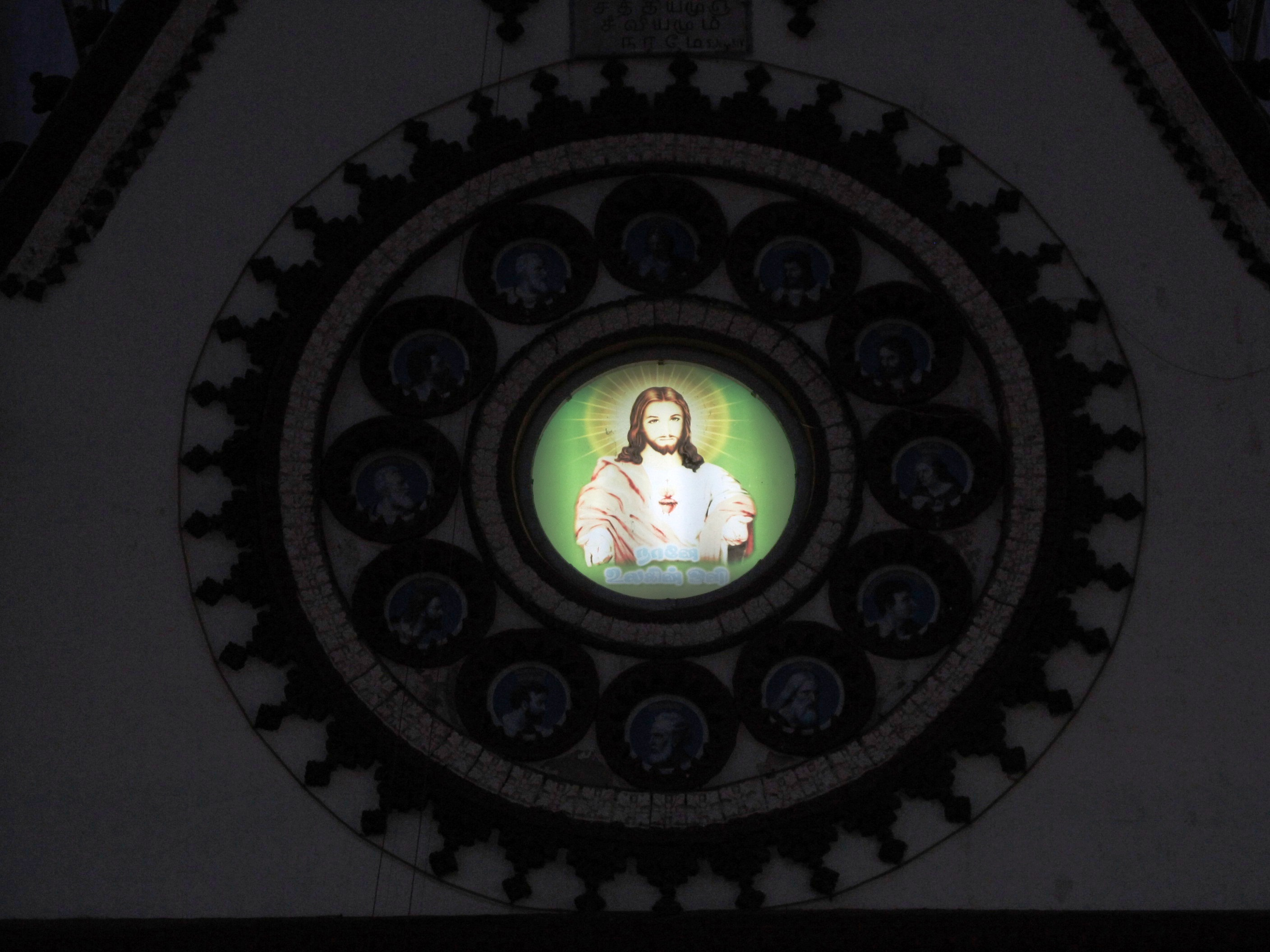
Jesus in Sacred Heart Church

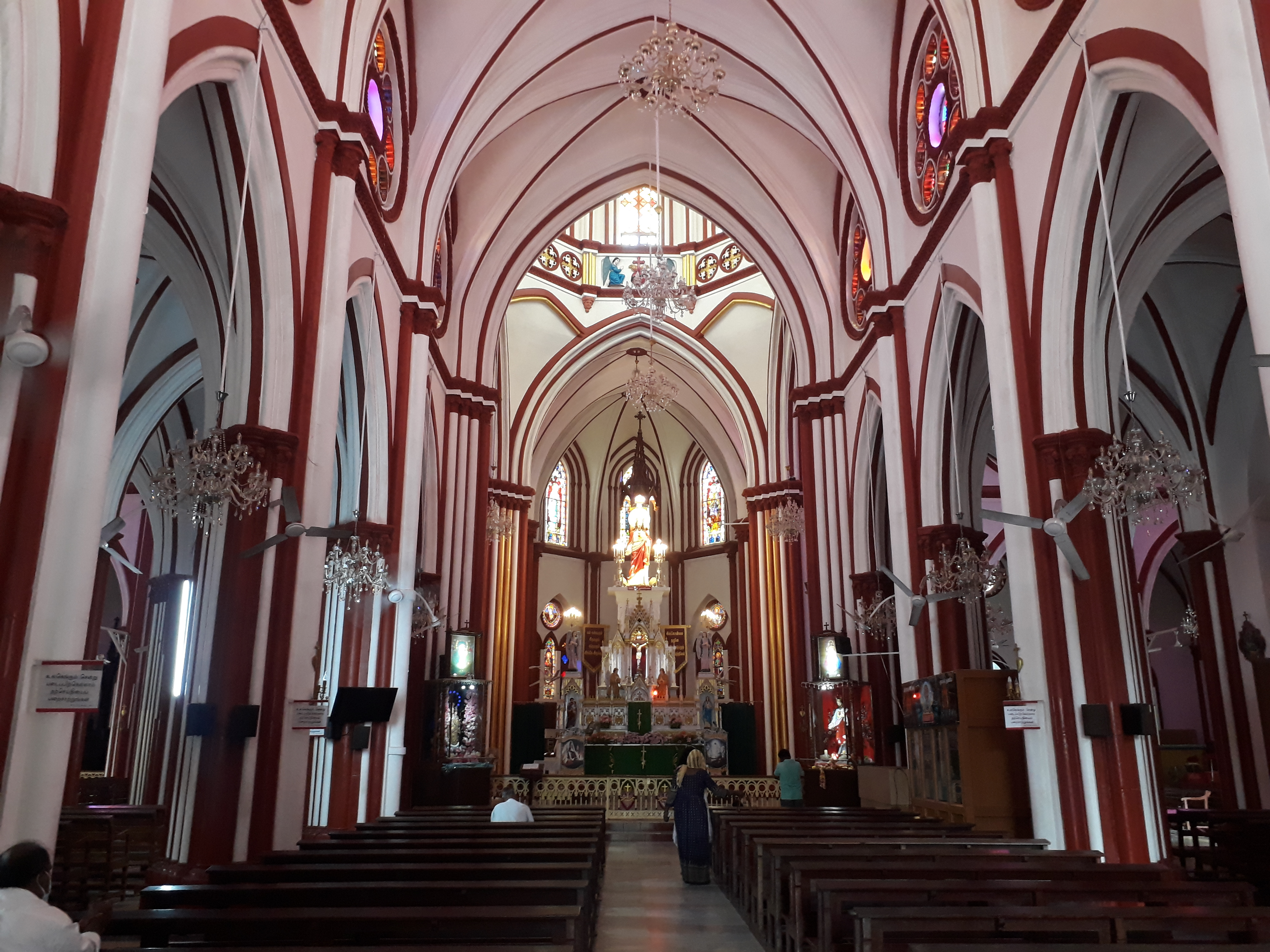
Interior Sacred Heart Church
