= Daniel Henry Mueggenborg =

American Catholic prelate (born 1961)

His Excellency, The Most Reverend Daniel Henry Mueggenborg
- Bishop of Reno
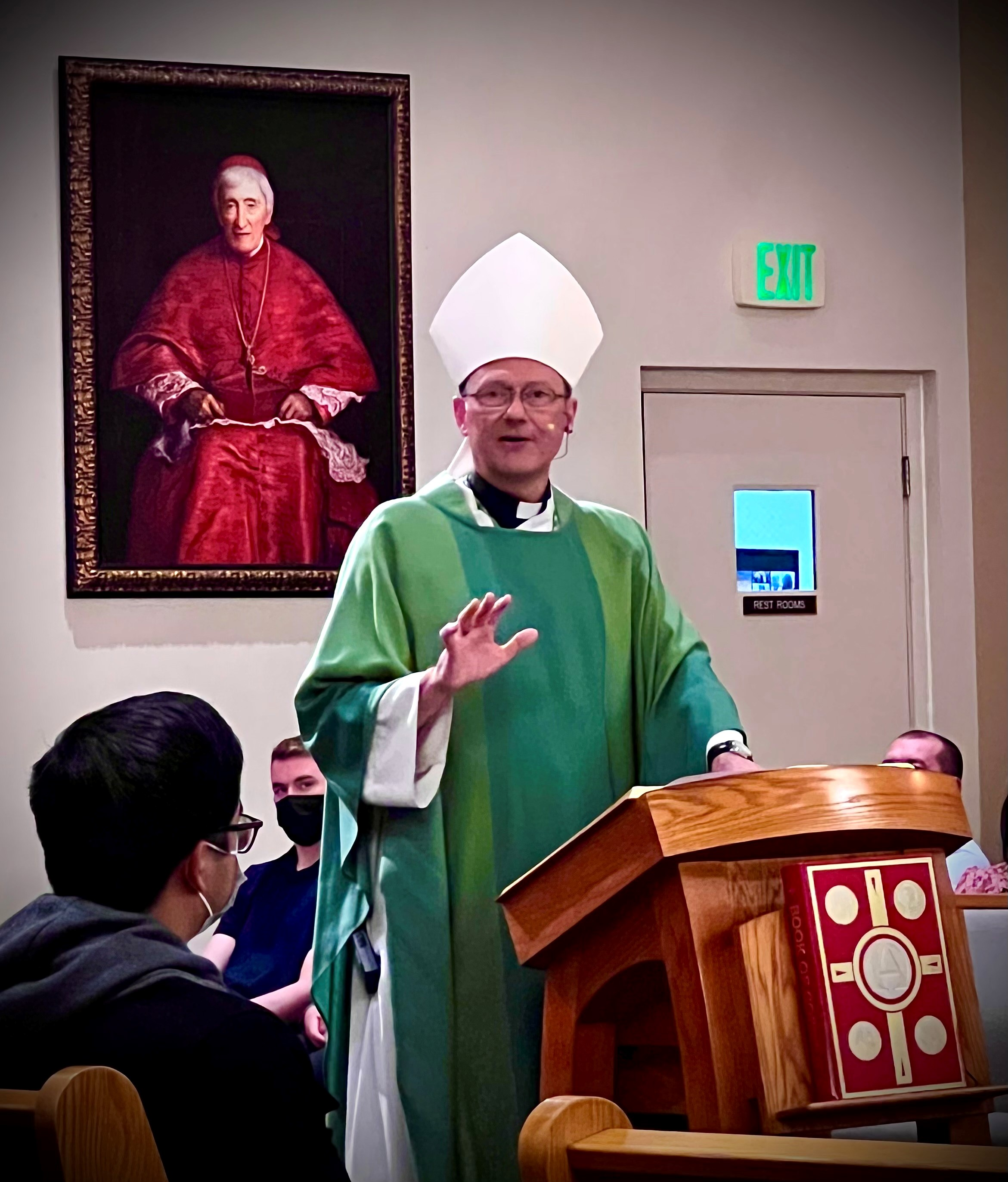
- Mueggenborg in 2022 while preaching at Our Lady of Wisdom at the University of Nevada, Reno.
- Diocese: Reno
- Appointed: July 20, 2021
- Installed: September 24, 2021
- Predecessor: Randolph Roque Calvo
- Previous post: Auxiliary Bishop of Seattle and Titular Bishop of Tullia (2017-2021)

Orders
- Ordination: July 14, 1989 by Eusebius J. Beltran
- Consecration: May 31, 2017 by J. Peter Sartain

Personal details
- Born: April 15, 1962 (age 64) Okarche, Oklahoma, US
- Education: Oklahoma State University; St. Meinrad Seminary; Pontifical Gregorian University
- Motto: Misericordes sicut Pater (Latin for 'Merciful like the Father')
- Styles
- Reference style: His Excellency; The Most Reverend
- Spoken style: Your Excellency
- Religious style: Bishop

Ordination history
History
Diaconal ordination
- Ordained by: John R. Quinn
- Date: April 6, 1989
- Place: St. Peter's Basilica; Vatican City
Priestly ordination
- Ordained by: Eusebius J. Beltran
- Date: July 14, 1989
- Place: Holy Family Cathedral; Tulsa, Oklahoma
Episcopal consecration
- Principal consecrator: J. Peter Sartain
- Co-consecrators: David Konderla; Eusebio L. Elizondo Almaguer
- Date: May 31, 2017
- Place: St. James Cathedral; Seattle, Washington

Daniel Henry Mueggenborg (born April 15, 1962) is an American Catholic prelate serving as the Bishop of Reno in Nevada since 2021. He served as an auxiliary bishop of the Archdiocese of Seattle from 2017 to 2021.

== Biography ==
Daniel Henry Mueggenborg was born in Okarche, Oklahoma, to Paul Bernard and Dolores Lucille (née Kerntke) Mueggenborg. He received his early education at the parochial school at St. Francis Xavier Parish in Stillwater, Oklahoma, where he attended Mass and served as an altar boy. Mueggenborg belonged to the Boy Scouts of America and received the Eagle Scout Award in 1980.

Mueggenborg entered Oklahoma State University (OSU) to pursue a science degree. He has stated that at that time he did not want to become a priest. However, in the spring of 1981, he served at a Mass that was celebrated by Stanley Rother, a missionary serving in Guatemala. Rother was murdered later that year in Guatemala by a right-wing death squad. According to Mueggenborg, Rother's service and martyrdom inspired him to pursue the priesthood. After graduating from OSU in 1984 with a Bachelor of Science degree in geology, he entered St. Meinrad Seminary in Saint Meinrad, Indiana.

In 1985, Mueggenborg traveled to Rome to attend the Pontifical Gregorian University in Rome. As a seminarian, he worked alongside the Missionaries of Charity to serve the poor in Rome. On one occasion, he celebrated a mass attended by the founder of the order, Mother Teresa. Back in Oklahoma for a summer, Mueggenborg volunteered as a hospital minister in intensive care units and cardiac wards at St. John Medical Center in Tulsa. He spent a second summer in Mugumu, Tanzania, working alongside Maryknoll Missionaries.

Mueggenborg was ordained to the diaconate on April 6, 1989, at St. Peter's Basilica in Rome; he was granted an audience the next day with Pope John Paul II at the Apostolic Palace. He received a Bachelor of Sacred Theology from the Gregorian University in 1989.

=== Priesthood ===
On July 14, 1989, Mueggenborg was ordained by Archbishop Eusebius Beltran to the priesthood for the Diocese of Tulsa at Holy Family Cathedral in Tulsa.

After his 1989 ordination, the diocese assigned Mueggenborg as an associate pastor at Church of St. Mary Parish in Tulsa. He was transferred to perform the same role in 1990 to St. John Parish in Bartlesville, Oklahoma. That same year, he earned his Licentiate in Sacred Theology in biblical theology from the Gregorian. In 1990, Mueggenborg returned to Tulsa in 1991 to become chaplain at Bishop Kelley High School and associate pastor of Saint Pius X Parish. He would hold both positions for the next four years.

Mueggenborg was moved from Tulsa in 1994 to serve as administrator pro tempore of Saint Cecilia Parish in Claremore, then in 1996 to Bixby, to be pastor of St. Clement Parish. He returned to Bartlesville in 2001 to serve as pastor at St. John's Parish for the next five years. Mueggenborg went to Rome in 2006 to work as assistant director of formation advising at the Pontifical North American College for one year. He was assigned as Pastor of Christ the King Parish, Tulsa in 2011, serving until 2017

Additionally, Mueggenborg served on the boards of directors for Ascension Healthcare and Catholic Charities of Tulsa. The Vatican named Mueggenborg a monsignor in 2004.

=== Auxiliary Bishop of Seattle ===
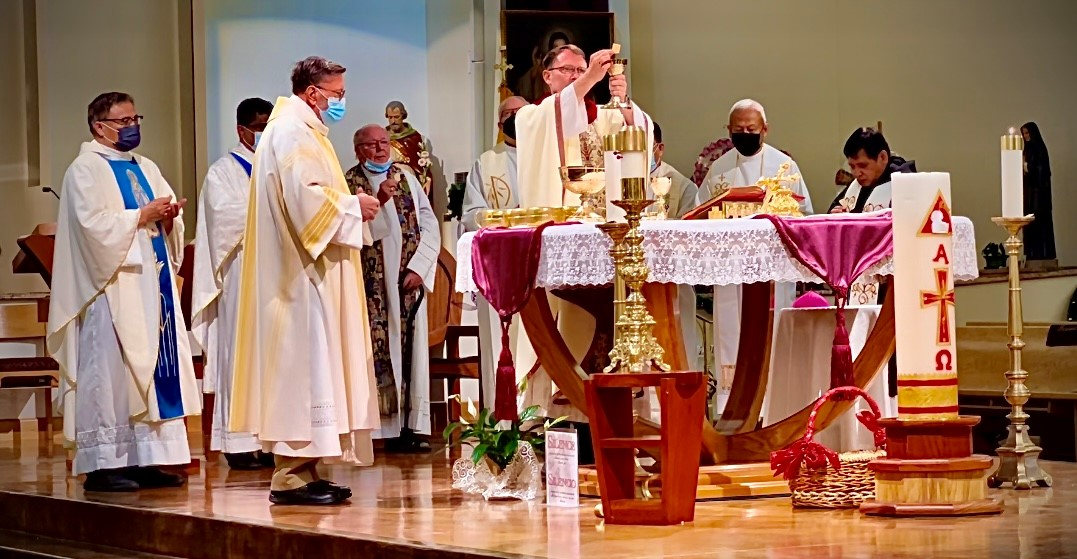
Bishop Mueggenborg holding the host at Immaculate Conception Catholic Church in Sparks, Nevada (2022)

Pope Francis appointed Mueggenborg as an auxiliary bishop of Seattle on April 6, 2017. On May 31, 2017, he was consecrated by Archbishop J. Peter Sartain at St. James Cathedral in Seattle, with Bishops David Konderla and Eusebio L. Elizondo Almaguer serving as co-consecrators.

=== Bishop of Reno ===
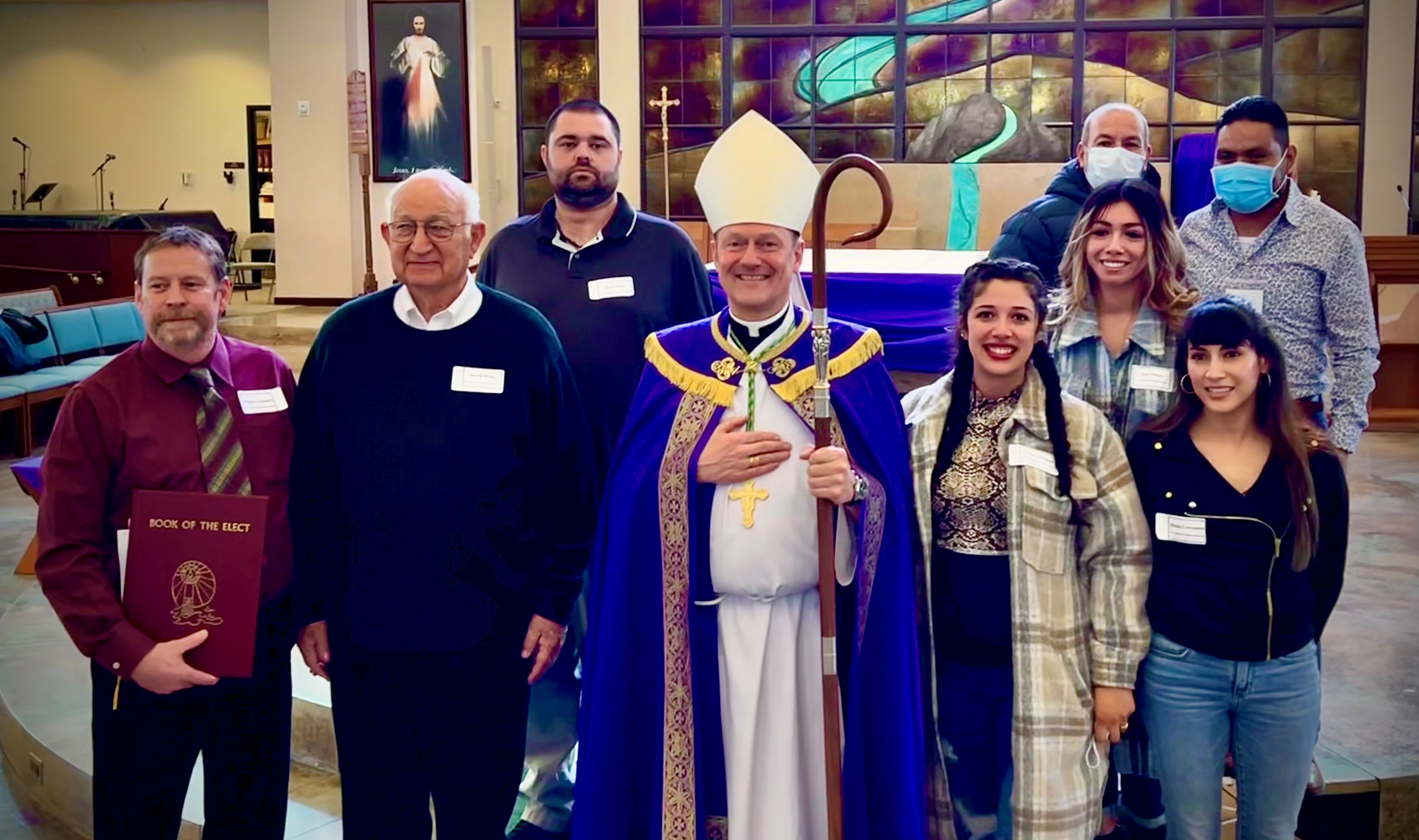
Bishop Mueggenborg at St Rose of Lima Church in Reno, Nevada (2022)

On July 20, 2021, Pope Francis appointed Mueggenborg as bishop of Reno, succeeding Bishop Randolph Calvo. Mueggenborg was installed on September 24, 2021.

== Publications ==
Books

- Come Follow Me. Discipleship Reflections on the Sunday Gospel Readings for Liturgical Year C (Angelwing Publishing, 2015)
- Come Follow Me: Discipleship Reflections on the Sunday Gospel Readings for Liturgical Year A (Angelwing Publishing, 2016)
- Come Follow Me: Discipleship Reflections on the Sunday Gospel Readings for Liturgical Year B (Angelwing Publishing, 2017)

== See also ==
- Catholic Church hierarchy
- Catholic Church in the United States
- Historical list of the Catholic bishops of the United States
- List of Catholic bishops of the United States
- Lists of patriarchs, archbishops, and bishops

Catholic Church titles
Preceded by Randolph Roque Calvo	Bishop of Reno; 2021-Present	Succeeded by Incumbent
Preceded by -	Auxiliary Bishop of Seattle; 2017-2021	Succeeded by Frank R. Schuster
