= Bernard J. Ganter =

Catholic bishop (1928–1993)

His Excellency, The Most Reverend Bernard Jacques Ganter
- Bishop of Beaumont
- Church: Roman Catholic Church
- See: Diocese of Beaumont
- Appointed: December 13, 1972
- Installed: 1973
- Term ended: 1977
- Predecessor: Warren Louis Boudreaux
- Successor: Joseph Anthony Galante
- Previous post: Bishop of Tulsa (1973 to 1977)

Orders
- Ordination: May 22, 1952 by Wendelin Joseph Nold
- Consecration: February 2, 1973 by Luigi Raimondi

Personal details
- Born: July 17, 1928 Galveston, Texas, US
- Died: October 9, 1993 (aged 65)
- Buried: Bishop's Garden, St. Anthony Cathedral, Beaumont
- Parents: Bernard and Marie (née Bozka) Ganter
- Education: Texas A&M University; St. Mary's Seminary; Catholic University of America
- Coat of arms

Bernard Jacques Ganter (July 17, 1928 – October 9, 1993) was an American clergyman of the Roman Catholic Church. He served as bishop of the Diocese of Tulsa in Oklahoma from 1973 to 1977 and bishop of the Diocese of Beaumont in Texas from 1977 to 1993.

== Biography ==
=== Early life ===
Ganter was born on July 17, 1928, in Galveston, Texas, to Bernard and Marie (née Bozka) Ganter. He studied engineering at Texas A&M University for one year before transferring to St. Mary's Seminary in La Porte, Texas, to study for the priesthood.

=== Priesthood ===
Ganter was ordained to the priesthood for what was then the Diocese of Galveston by Bishop Wendelin Nold on May 22, 1952. After his ordination, the diocese sent Ganter to Washington, D.C., to attend the Catholic University of America, where he obtained a Doctor of Canon Law degree in 1955.

After returning to Texas, Ganter was appointed as curate at Sacred Heart Parish in Conroe and private secretary to Nold. In 1958, he left his position as secretary to serve as head of the diocesan tribunal. Ganter moved in 1966 to the role chancellor of the diocese and diocesan consultor. The Vatican named Ganter a papal chamberlain in 1964, and he was elected to the presbyterate council of the diocese the same year.

=== Bishop of Tulsa ===
On December 13, 1972, Ganter was appointed as the first bishop of the newly erected Diocese of Tulsa by Pope Paul VI. He received his episcopal consecration on February 2, 1973, from Archbishop Luigi Raimondi at the Cathedral of the Holy Family in Tulsa, with Bishops Nold and John Morkovsky serving as co-consecrators.

=== Bishop of Beaumont ===
Paul VI named Ganter as the third bishop of Beaumont on October 18, 1977. He was installed on December 13, 1977. As bishop, Ganter established five new parishes, including the first Vietnamese-language parish in the United States. He started the permanent diaconate in the diocese and ordained 36 men between 1979 and 1992. He also established a Catholic Charities office, a diocesan financial board, a retreat center, and a biblical school for adults.

Ganter was a board member of Immaculate Conception Seminary in Conception, Missouri, St. Gregory College in Shawnee, Oklahoma, the Catholic University of America, and St. Joseph Seminary in Covington, Louisiana.

=== Death and legacy ===
Ganter died on October 9, 1993, from a brain tumor at age 65. He is buried in the Bishop's Garden next to St. Anthony Cathedral.

In 1991, Ganter received a letter accusing a diocesan priest, Frank Paduch, of inappropriate conduct with minors at Monsignor Kelly Catholic High School in Beaumont. Ganter passed the letter to the school principal, who spoke with Paduch. Ganter did not notify police or suspend Paduch. In 1996, the parents of one boy said that Paduch served him alcohol and was abusive to him. Paduch was forced to resign from the high school faculty.

Catholic Church titles
Preceded by None	Bishop of Tulsa; 1973–1977	Succeeded by Eusebius J. Beltran
Preceded by Warren Louis Boudreaux	Bishop of Beaumont; 1977–1993	Succeeded by Joseph Anthony Galante
