= Church of the Madalene =

Parish in Oklahoma, US

- Parish
- Interactive map of Church of the Madalene
- Coordinates: 36°7′51″N 95°56′28″W
- Country: USA
- State: Oklahoma
- City: Tulsa
- Established: 1946

Government

Church of the Madalene was established as a parish in the Roman Catholic Diocese of Tulsa in 1946. It is located at 22nd and Harvard in mid-town in the city of Tulsa in the state of Oklahoma.

The parish motto is A Roman Catholic community of faith serving the Lord in word and deed..

== Clergy ==
- Fr. Desmond Okpogba
- Deacon Nelson Sousa
- Deacon Robert DeWeese (retired)
- Deacon Larry McFadden (retired)

== Staff ==
- June Benton (Business Manager)
- Anne Edwards (Pastoral Care)
- Becky Holder (Director of Youth Formation)
- Jennifer Merle (Parish Life Coordinator)

== See also ==
- Roman Catholic Diocese of Tulsa
- Bishop Edward James Slattery
