= Curtis J. Guillory =

Catholic bishop

His Excellency, The Most Reverend Curtis John Guillory D.D., S.V.D.
- Bishop Emeritus of Beaumont
- Church: Catholic Church
- See: Diocese of Beaumont
- Appointed: June 2, 2000
- Installed: July 28, 2000
- Retired: June 9, 2020
- Predecessor: Joseph Anthony Galante
- Successor: David Toups
- Previous post: Auxiliary Bishop of Galveston–Houston (1988–2000)

Orders
- Ordination: December 16, 1972 by Carlos Ambrosio Lewis Tullock
- Consecration: February 19, 1988 by Joseph Fiorenza, Philip Hannan, and J. Terry Steib

Personal details
- Born: September 1, 1943 (age 82) Mallet, Louisiana, US
- Education: Divine Word College; Catholic Theological Union
- Motto: Diligentibus Deum omnia cooperantur (For those who love God, all things work together for good)

Styles of Curtis John Guillory
- Reference style: His Excellency; The Most Reverend
- Spoken style: Your Excellency
- Religious style: Bishop

Curtis John Guillory, S.V.D. (born September 1, 1943) is an American Catholic prelate and member of the Society of the Divine Word who served as Bishop of Beaumont from 2000 to 2020. He previously served as an auxiliary bishop for the Archdiocese of Galveston–Houston from 1988 to 2000, and was the first Black Catholic bishop in Texas history.

== Biography ==
=== Early years ===
Curtis Guillory was born on September 1, 1943, to Wilfred and Theresa Guillory (née Jardoin) on September 1, 1943, in Bayou Mallet, Louisiana. He is the oldest of 17 children (six sons, and eleven daughters).

Guillory is a descendant of Louisiana free people of color. His father owned a small farm and worked on another one. Curtis and his siblings helped staff the farm. Curtis entered the Society of Divine Word's St. Augustine Seminary in Bay St. Louis, Mississippi, where he played on the seminary baseball team. In a 2020 interview with the Beaumont Enterprise, Guillory recalled that both his parents were hospitalized at one point.

In 1968, Guillory earned a Bachelor of Arts degree from the Divine Word College at Epworth, Iowa, in 1968. He later earned a Master of Divinity degree at Catholic Theological Union in Chicago, Illinois.

=== Priesthood ===
On December 16, 1972, Guillory was ordained to the priesthood for the Society of Divine Word at St. Ann Church in Mallet Bayou by Auxiliary Bishop Carlos Ambrosio Lewis Tullock from the Archdiocese of Panamá. The Society first sent Guillory to St. Augustine Parish in New Orleans. He served three years there as an associate pastor and six years as pastor.

Guillory was the founding director of the Tolton House of Studies in New Orleans, the seminary residence for Divine Word students. Guillory also served as a member of the executive committee of the National Association of Black Catholic Administrators, the Louisiana One Church/One Family adoption program, national chaplain to the Knights of Peter Claver, a member of the archdiocesan presbyteral council, and a board member of the Spirituality Center.

In 1986, Guillory earned a Master of Christian Spirituality degree from Creighton University in Omaha, Nebraska. He completed a summer workshop in Jungian psychology in Switzerland. In September 1987, Guillory coordinated the visit of Pope John Paul II to New Orleans.

=== Auxiliary Bishop of Galveston–Houston ===
On December 29, 1987, John Paul II appointed Guillory as auxiliary bishop of Galveston–Houston. He was consecrated on February 19, 1988. For his episcopal motto, Guillory chose Romans 8:28: "For those who love God, all things work together for good."

In the US Conference of Catholic Bishops (USCCB), Guillory was selected chair of the Committee of African American Catholics. Guillory also served on the national committee on Hispanic Affairs and Priestly Life and Ministry, and the boards of Sacred Heart Seminary and Xavier University in New Orleans. He was a board member of the YMCA, the Mental Health Association, and the Harris County Hospital District in Harris County, Texas.

=== Bishop of Beaumont ===
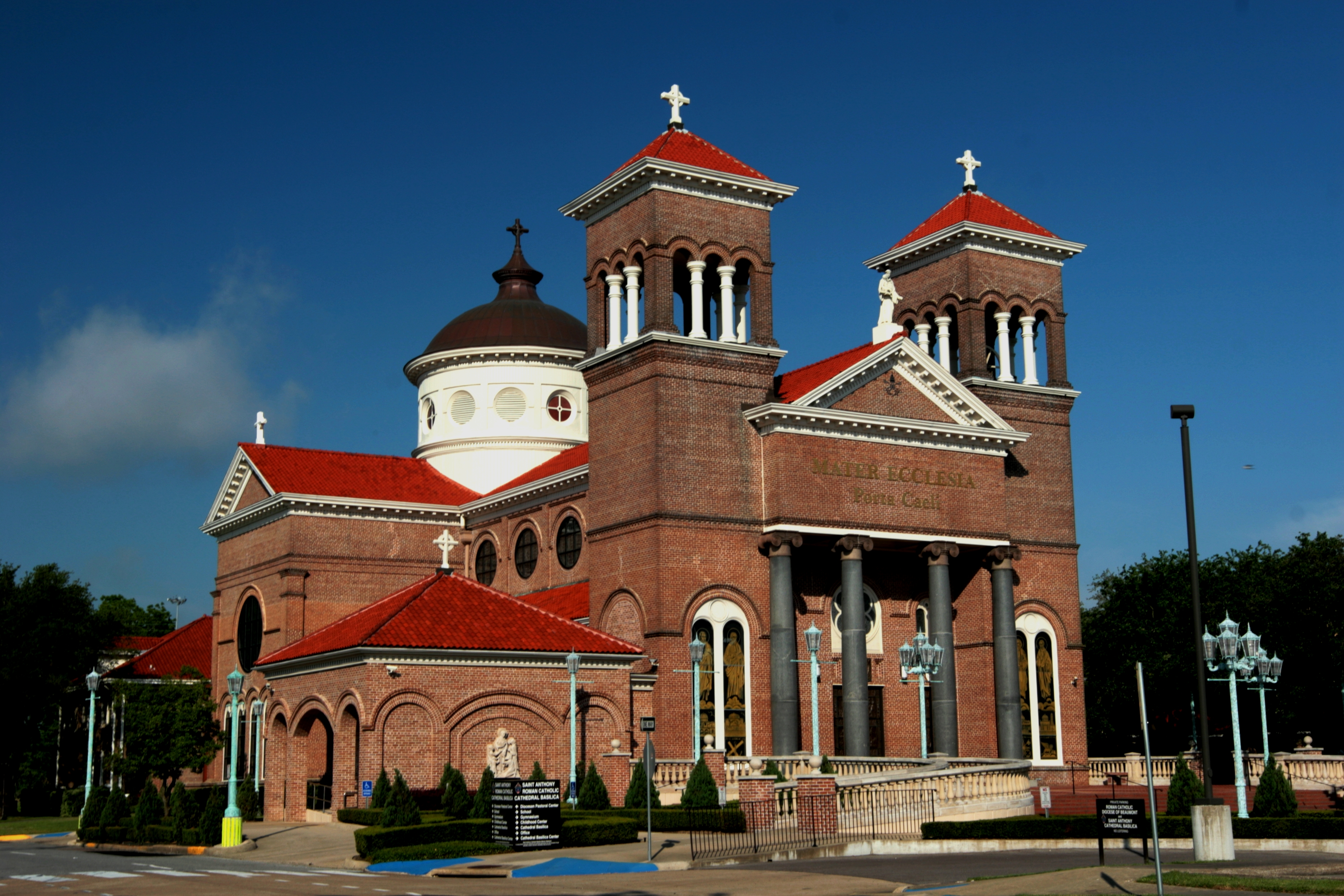
St Anthony Cathedral Basilica, Beaumont, Texas (2008)

On June 2, 2000, John Paul II appointed Guillory bishop of Beaumont. He was installed on July 28, 2000. Guillory was the first African American bishop to lead a Texas diocese and the first Beaumont bishop to belong to a religious congregation. He remained a member of the Society of the Divine Word, but an active bishop was not under its jurisdiction.

While in Beaumont, Guillory established the St. Anthony Cathedral as a basilica, built a Catholic chapel at Lamar University in Beaumont and established a new Catholic Pastoral Center. He also created the Catholic Foundation of the Diocese of Beaumont and started a capital campaign for it. In 2016, Guillory received the Rabbi Samuel Rosinger Humanitarian Award, presented by Temple Emanuel in Beaumont, Texas.

=== Retirement and legacy ===
Pope Francis accepted Guillory's resignation on June 9, 2020. and named David Toups as his successor.

Catholic Church titles
Preceded by Joseph Anthony Galante	Bishop of Beaumont; 2000–2020	Succeeded by David Toups
Preceded by –	Auxiliary Bishop of Galveston–Houston; 1988–2000	Succeeded by –
