= David Toups =

American Catholic prelate (born 1971)

The Most Reverend David Toups
- Bishop of Beaumont
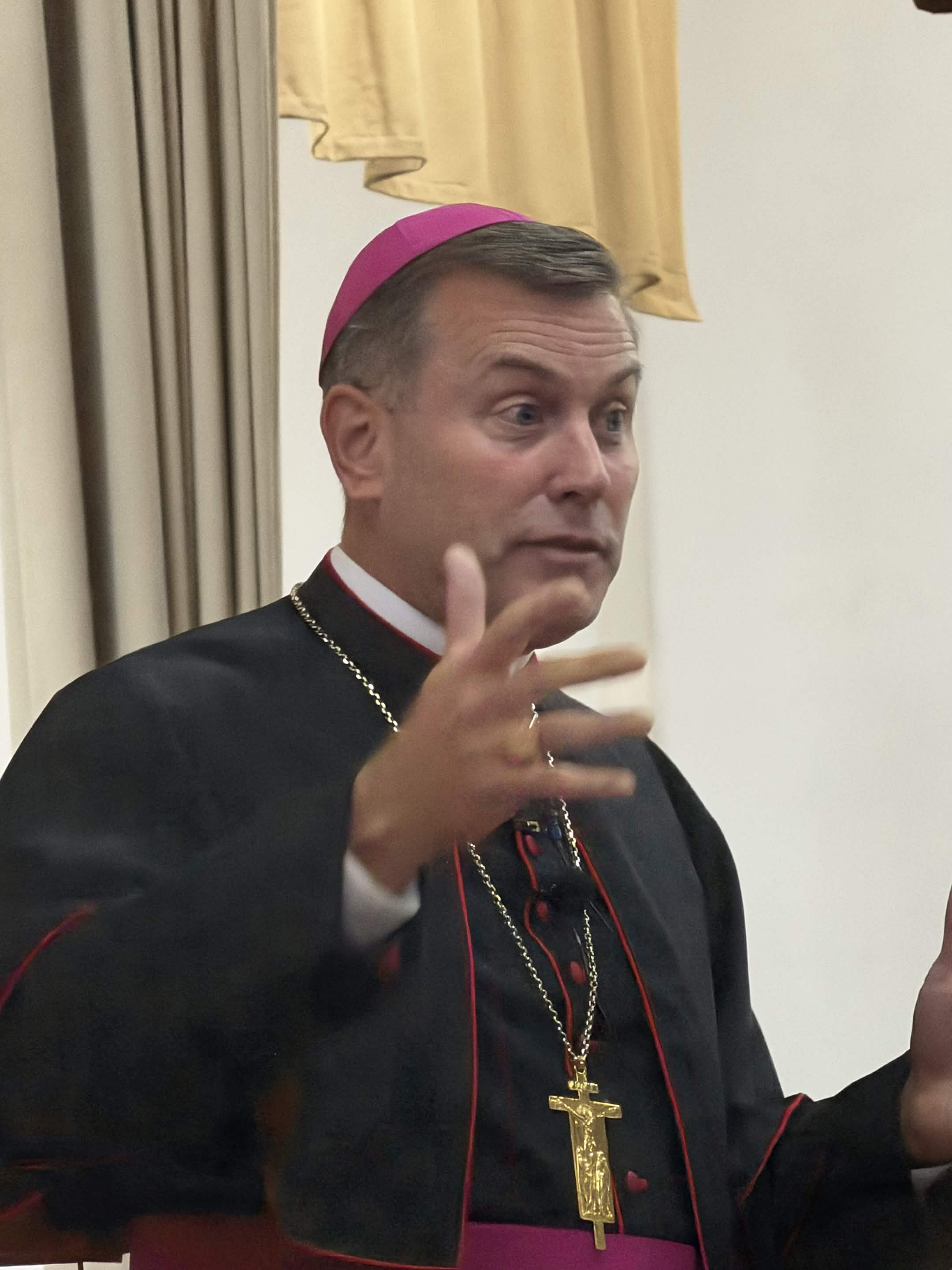
- Toups in 2026 giving a talk at the Marian Days pilgrimage in Carthage, Missouri.
- Church: Catholic
- Diocese: Beaumont
- Appointed: June 9, 2020
- Installed: August 21, 2020
- Predecessor: Curtis J. Guillory

Personal details
- Born: March 26, 1971 (age 55) Seattle, Washington, US
- Education: Florida Southern College; St. John Vianney College Seminary; Pontifical University of St. Thomas Aquinas; Pontifical Gregorian University
- Motto: Diligentibus Deum omnia cooperantur in bonum (Latin for 'All things work together for good to those who love God')

Ordination history
History
Diaconal ordination
- Ordained by: Edwin Frederick O’Brien
Priestly ordination
- Ordained by: Robert Nugent Lynch
Episcopal consecration
- Principal consecrator: Daniel Nicholas DiNardo
- Co-consecrators: Curtis John Guillory SVD and Edward James Burns
- Styles
- Reference style: His Excellency; The Most Reverend
- Spoken style: Your Excellency
- Religious style: Bishop

David Leon Toups (born 26 March 1971) is an American Catholic prelate serving as the Bishop of Beaumont in Texas since 2020. He was previously rector of St. Vincent de Paul Regional Seminary in Boynton Beach, Florida from 2012 to 2020.

== Biography ==
=== Early life ===
David Leon Toups was born on March 26, 1971, in Seattle, Washington. He first attended Florida Southern College in Lakeland, Florida. However, after deciding to become a priest, he entered St. John Vianney College Seminary in Miami, Florida. Toups graduated from St. John in 1993 with a Bachelor of Arts degree in philosophy and theology.

Toups then traveled to Rome to enter the Pontifical North American College. He ultimately obtained a Bachelor of Sacred Theology degree and a Licentiate of Sacred Theology from the Pontifical Gregorian University in Rome.

=== Priestly career ===
Toups was ordained to the priesthood for the Diocese of Saint Petersburg on June 14, 1997, at the Cathedral of Saint Jude the Apostle in St. Petersburg by Bishop Robert Lynch.

After his 1997 ordination, the diocese assigned Toups as parochial vicar at St. Frances Cabrini Parish in Spring Hill, Florida and as a member of the presbyteral council from 1997 to 2001. He also served as a board member of the National Federation of Priests’ Councils. From 2000 to 2002, he served as observer for Region IV to the U.S. Conference of Catholic Bishops (USCCB) November meetings.

In 2002, Toups returned to Rome to study at the Pontifical University of St. Thomas Aquinas, receiving a Doctor of Sacred Theology degree in 2004. Back in Florida in 2004, he was appointed to the faculty at St. Vincent de Paul Regional Seminary as a professor of sacramental and liturgical theology and as assistant dean of students. Toups was named dean of students later in 2004. During this period, he was also a member of the administrative council, the faculty council, and the seminary formation team.

In 2007, Toups left St. Vincent de Paul to become associate director of the Secretariat of Clergy, Consecrated Life and Vocations at the USCCB in Washington, D.C. That position ended in 2010 when the Diocese of St. Petersburg named him as pastor of Christ the King Parish in Tampa, Florida. Toups was moved from that position in 2012 to return to St. Vincent de Paul as rector and president.

=== Bishop of Beaumont ===
On June 9, 2020, Pope Francis appointed Toups as bishop of Beaumont. He was consecrated by Cardinal Daniel DiNardo on August 21, 2020, at the Cathedral Basilica of St. Anthony in Beaumont. Toups chose as his episcopal motto Romans 8:28, based on his predecessor's motto and his mother's favorite quote, “For those who love God, all things work together for good.”

== See also ==
- Catholic Church hierarchy
- Catholic Church in the United States
- Historical list of the Catholic bishops of the United States
- List of Catholic bishops of the United States
- Lists of patriarchs, archbishops, and bishops
- St. Vincent de Paul Regional Seminary

Catholic Church titles
Preceded by Curtis J. Guillory	Bishop of Beaumont; 2020-Present	Succeeded by Incumbent
