= Saint Anthony Cathedral Basilica =

Catholic cathedral in Texas, US

St. Anthony Cathedral Basilica
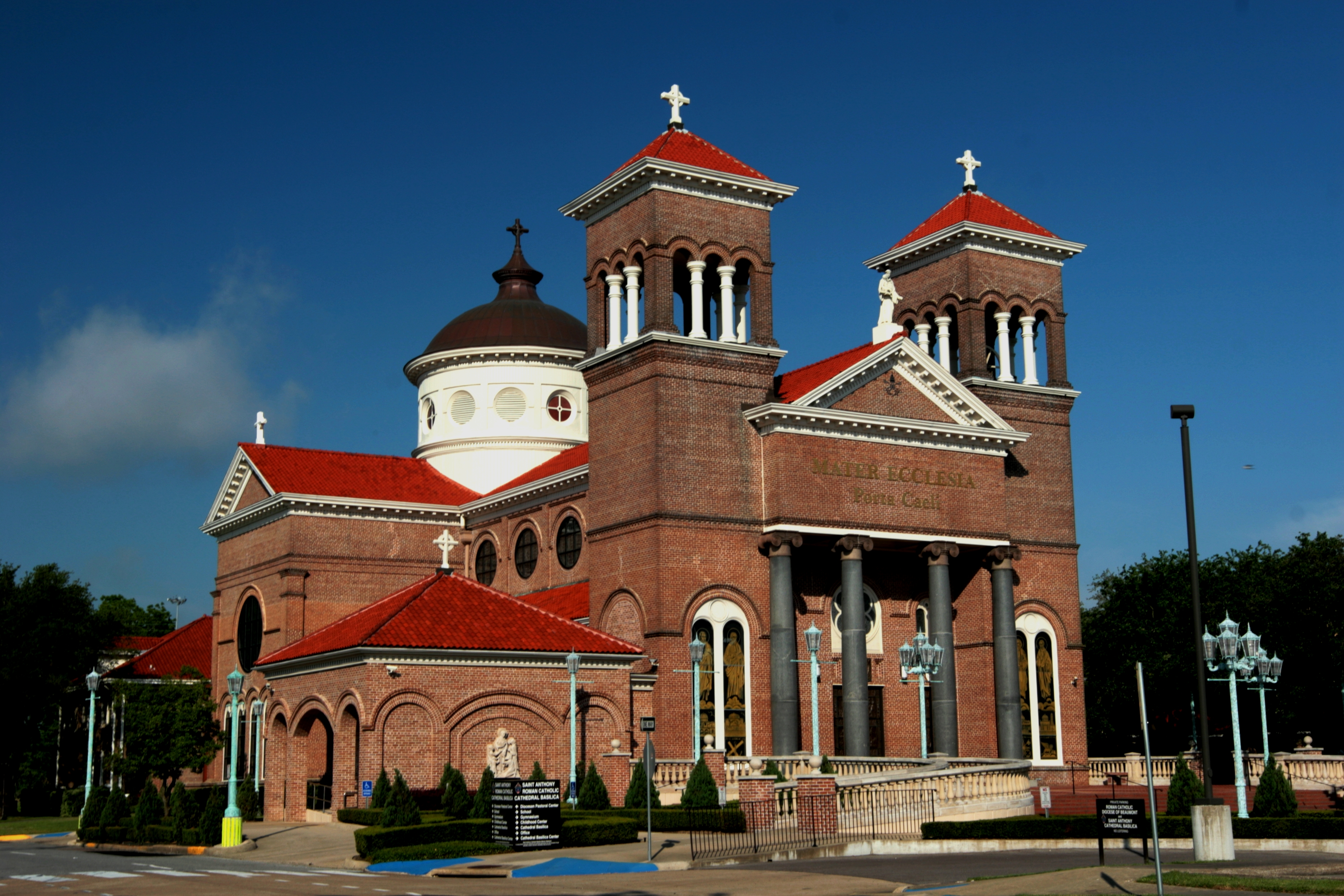
- St. Anthony Cathedral Basilica in 2008

- Location in Texas St. Anthony Cathedral Basilica (the United States)
- 30°04′40″N 94°06′03″W
- Location: 700 Jefferson St. Beaumont, Texas
- Country: United States
- Denomination: Catholic Church
- Sui iuris church: Latin Church
- Website: www.stanthonycathedralbasilica.org

History
- Status: Cathedral - Minor Basilica
- Dedication: Anthony of Padua
- Dedicated: January 27, 1907

Architecture
- Groundbreaking: 1903
- Completed: 1907

Specifications
- Materials: Brick

Administration
- Diocese: Beaumont

Clergy
- Bishop: Most Rev. David Toups
- Rector: Very Rev. M. Shane Baxter

Recorded Texas Historic Landmark
- Designated: 1980
- Marker: 10560

Saint Anthony Cathedral Basilica in Beaumont, Texas, is the cathedral of the Diocese of Beaumont. The cathedral was raised to the status of a minor basilica in 2006.

== History ==
=== Foundation ===
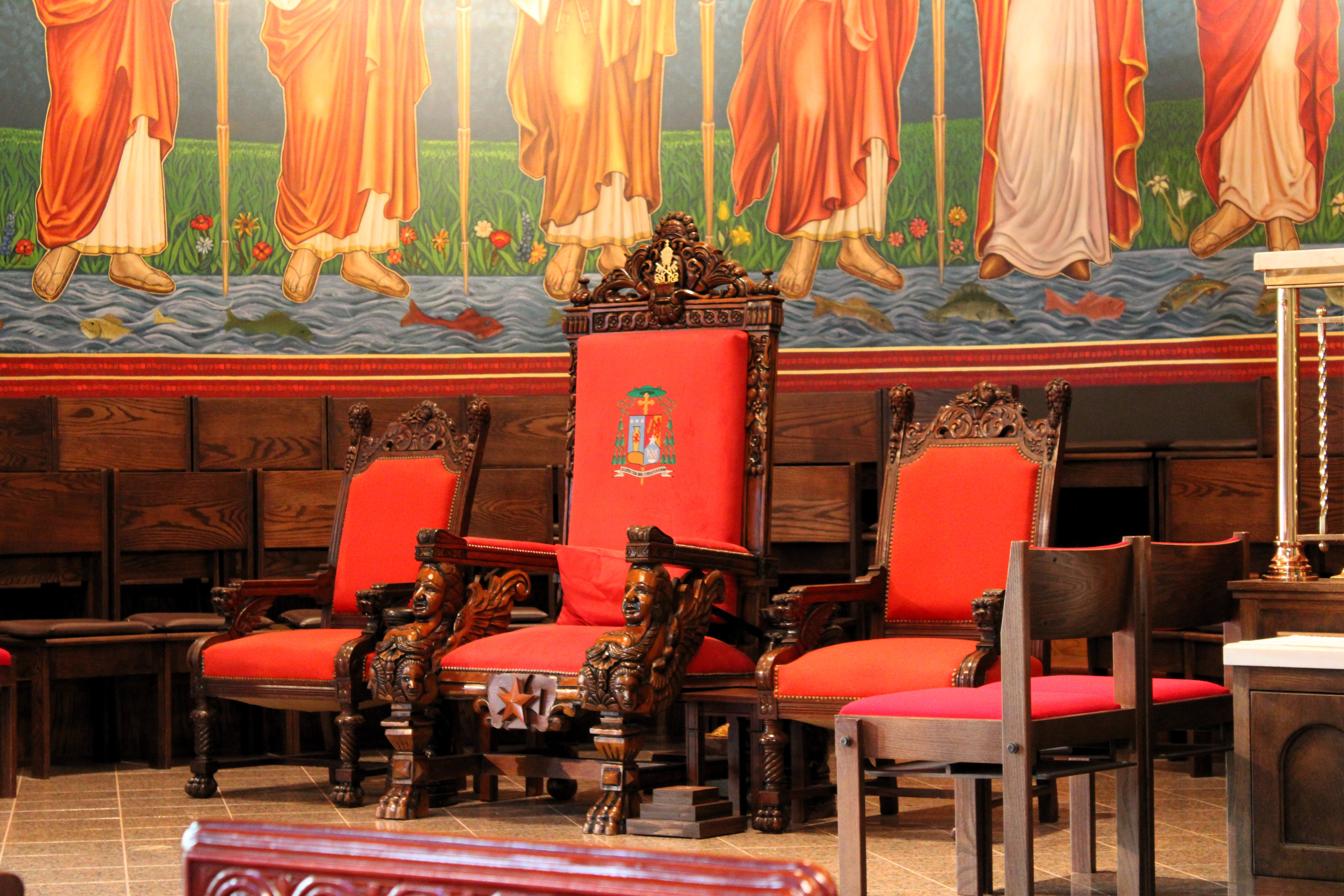
Cathedra

St. Anthony Cathedral Basilica's roots go back to 1853 when the Catholic Church sent priests on horseback to minister to the settlers around the port of Beaumont. In 1879, Bishop Jean-Marie Odin, C.M., first bishop of the Diocese of Galveston, and Fr. Vital Quinon built St. Louis Church and established the first formal Catholic parish community in Beaumont. St. Anthony Cathedral Basilica is the direct successor to this small limited seating structure and parish community. In 1901, following the Lucas Oil Boom, Bishop Nicolaus Gallagher, third bishop of Galveston, and Fr. William Lee built a new and larger church to take the place of the St. Louis parish church. Bishop Gallagher changed the name of St. Louis parish community to St. Anthony. The cornerstone of St. Anthony Church was blessed in 1903. In 1907 Bishop Gallagher dedicated the new brick church.

With the inception of the Diocese of Beaumont in 1966, St. Anthony Church was elevated to the rank of a cathedral by Pope Paul VI and Bishop Vincent Harris was installed as the first Bishop of Beaumont.

=== Development ===
The church building has undergone many changes through the leadership of several bishops and pastors. The first major interior restoration took place under Bishop Christopher Byrne, of the Diocese of Galveston, and Monsignor E. A. Kelly in 1937. Stained-glass windows were installed throughout the church and symbolic oil paintings were added behind the altar.

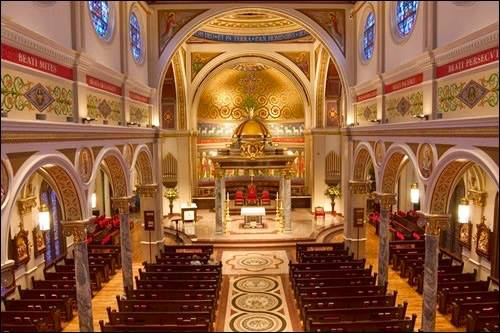
Interior

In 1972 Bishop Warren Louis Boudreaux, second Bishop of Beaumont, and Monsignor M. F. Enderle began the second major renovation of this sacred site in conformity with renewal of the Sacred Liturgy following the Second Vatican Council. A free-standing altar was introduced facing the people, an appropriate bishop's chair became a permanent fixture in the sanctuary, the art in the sanctuary and throughout the cathedral was renewed, the pews were refinished, kneelers replaced, carpeting installed, and new acoustical and lighting systems added. Extensive landscaping to the grounds was introduced, the exterior was renewed, the copper dome restored and a 2,500-pipe Wicks organ installed. Bishop Bernard J. Ganter, third Bishop of Beaumont, and Monsignor Bennie Patillo undertook the building of a new cathedral center and chapel-office complex that was dedicated in 1991. In 1998, Bishop Joseph Anthony Galante, fourth Bishop of Beaumont, and Monsignor Jeremiah J. McGrath began extensive repairs of the cathedral. At the beginning of the third millennium, Bishop Curtis J. Guillory, S.V.D., fifth Bishop of Beaumont, and Monsignor McGrath began a major liturgical renovation of the cathedral. On October 17, 2004, Bishop Guillory re-dedicated and consecrated historic Saint Anthony Cathedral.

=== Minor basilica ===
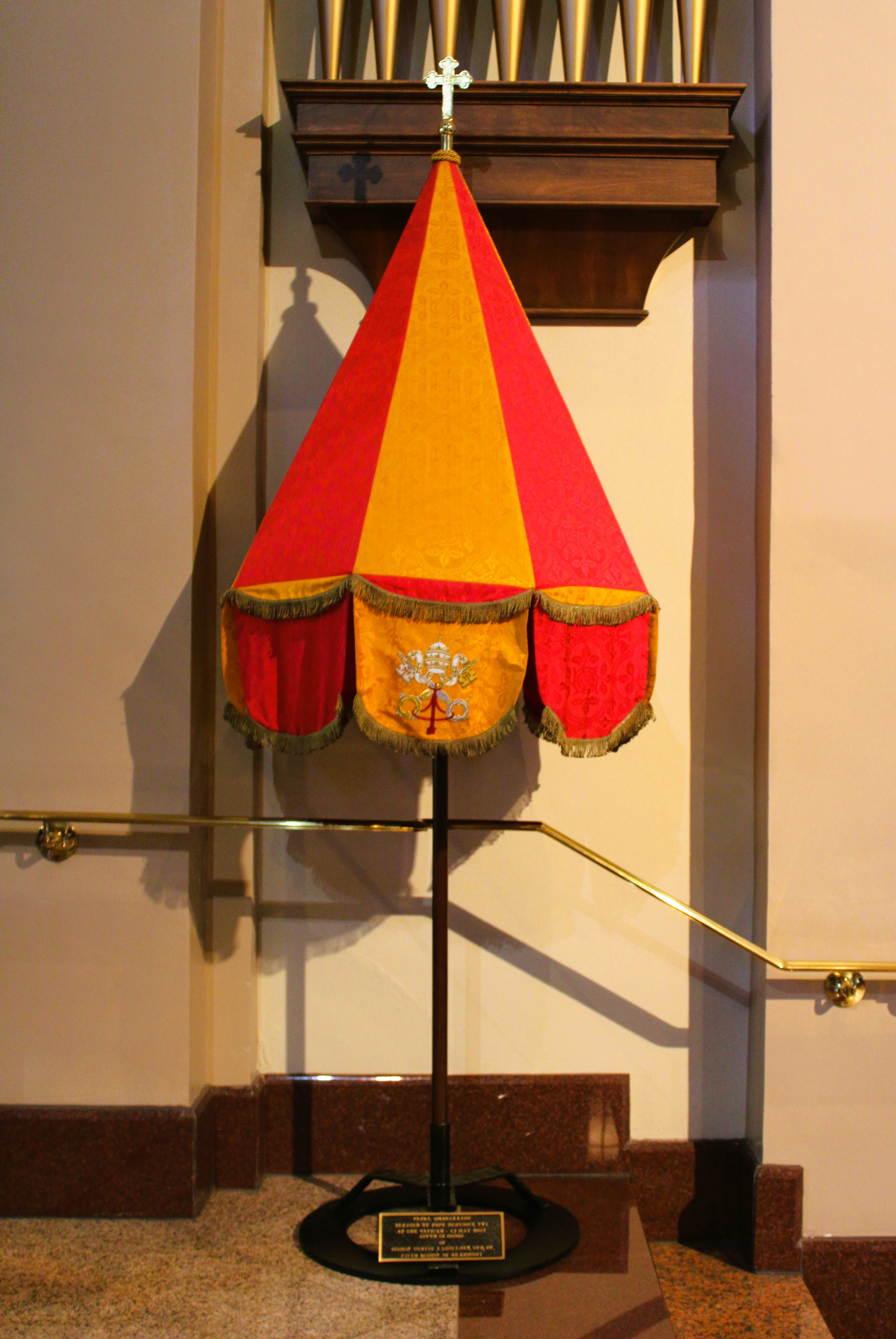
Ombrellino

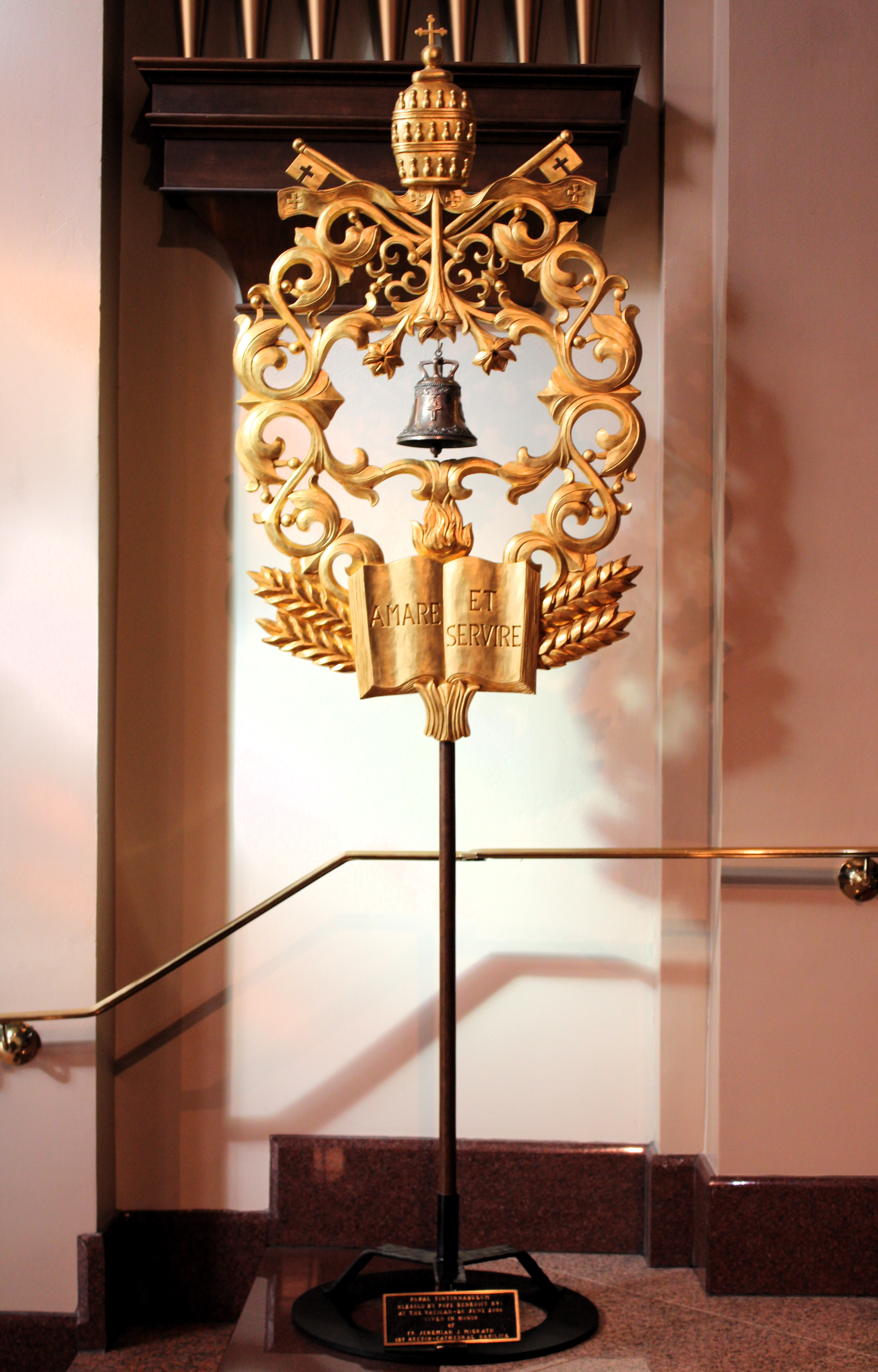
Tintinnabulum

On July 11, 2006, Pope Benedict XVI recognized the historical significance of Saint Anthony Cathedral by proclaiming it a minor basilica. Following a year-long diocesan jubilee year celebrating the centenary of Saint Anthony Cathedral, the papal decree, papal ombrellino (basilica umbrella) and papal tintinnabulum (basilica bell) were solemnly installed on October 21, 2007.

Saint Anthony Cathedral Basilica's papal ombrellino (basilica umbrella) was blessed by Pope Benedict XVI on May 23, 2007. This half-opened umbrella is constructed of red and gold Belgium silk damask. The heraldic shields of the Holy See; Pope Benedict XVI; Bishop Curtis J. Guillory, S.V.D.; the Diocese of Beaumont; and the Cathedral Basilica of Saint Anthony are embroidered on the papal ombrellino's flaps. Referred to by a wide variety of names, such as ombrellino and basilica pavilion, umbrellas (fully opened) were once used during papal processions through the streets of Rome to protect the pope from the weather. Today, the ombrellino is used as a symbol of a minor basilica's distinct bond to the papacy. The ombrellino stand half-opened in minor basilicas throughout the world as a way of symbolically anticipating the arrival of the pope at a basilica, his "home away from home."

The cathedral basilica's papal tintinnabulum (basilica bell) was also blessed by Pope Benedict XVI on June 28, 2006, and was blessed a second time by the pontiff on May 23, 2007. This elaborate bell, cast in Padua, Italy, is housed within a beautiful hand-carved gold gilded wooden Italian stanchion (post) that is decorated with the papal keys and tridendum (papal crown), common symbols of the pope and his pastoral ministry. Also decorating this bell stanchion are three lilies that symbolize St. Anthony's purity, the Gospel book and flame symbolizing the eloquent preaching of St. Anthony, and four wheat stalks symbolizing the charity of St. Anthony, who fed the poor. The papal bell was once used during papal processions in Rome and today is used as a symbol of a minor basilica's definite union with the pope.

The basilica holds a relic of Pope John Paul II, a zucchetto worn and signed by the pope.

== Historic recognition ==
The historic legacy of the cathedral basilica was recognized by the City of Beaumont in 1975 as a heritage site and in 1980 the Texas Historical Commission named it a Recorded Texas Historic Landmark.

== See also ==
- List of Catholic cathedrals in the United States
- List of cathedrals in the United States
- Recorded Texas Historic Landmarks in Jefferson County

== Sources ==
- Castaneda, Carlos Eduado, Our Catholic Heritage in Texas 1519 - 1957, 7 vols [Austin, Texas: Von Boeckmann-Jones Company, 1936 - 1958]
- Cody, John M., History and Symbolism of Saint Anthony Church [Beaumont, Texas: Saint Anthony Parish, 1943]
- Giles, Robert C.; researched by Mary Ann Acosta, and Kenny J. Cluse, Changing Time; The Story of the Diocese of Galveston - Houston in Commemoration of its Founding [Houston, Texas: Most Reverend John L. Morkovski, S.T.D. 1977]
- Caperol, Edythe G., History of Saint Anthony's Cathedral and Parish, Texas Gulf Historical and Biographical Record and Lamar University, Vol. XV [Beaumont, Texas, 1979]
- Vanderholt, James F.; Martinez, Carolyn B.; and Gilman, Karen A., The Diocese of Beaumont: The Catholic Story of Southeast Texas [Beaumont, Texas: The Diocese of Beaumont, 1991]
- Landregan, Steve, Catholic Texans; Our Family Album [Strasbourg, France: Editions du Signe, and Dallas, Texas: The Diocese of Dallas, 2003]
