= Diocese of Beaumont =

Latin Catholic jurisdiction in the US

Coordinates: 30°04′48″N 94°07′36″W

Diocese of Beaumont Dioecesis Bellomontensis
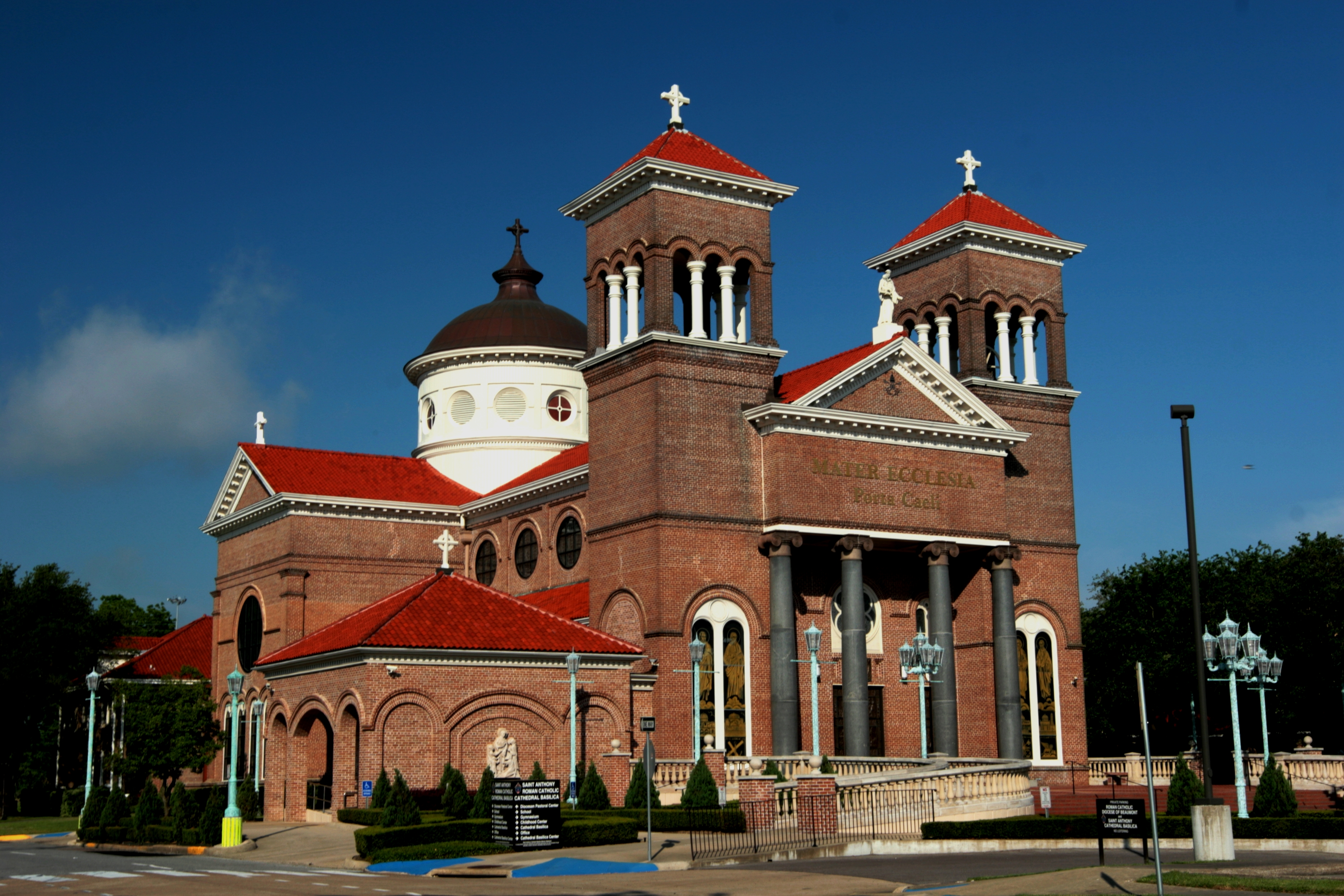
- St. Anthony Cathedral-Basilica

- Coat of arms

Location
- Country: United States
- Territory: The counties of Chambers, Hardin, Jasper, Jefferson, Liberty, Newton, Orange, Polk, and Tyler in southeast Texas
- Ecclesiastical province: Galveston-Houston
- Headquarters: 710 Archie Street, Beaumont, Texas 77701

Statistics
- Area: 7,878 sq mi (20,400 km^{2})
- Population: Total; Catholics: (as of 2016); 630,000; 71,000 (11.2%)
- Parishes: 44

Information
- Denomination: Catholic
- Sui iuris church: Latin Church
- Rite: Roman Rite
- Established: September 29, 1966 (60 years ago)
- Cathedral: Saint Anthony Cathedral Basilica
- Patron saint: St. Anthony of Padua

Current leadership
- Pope: Leo XIV
- Bishop: David Toups
- Metropolitan Archbishop: Joe S. Vásquez
- Vicar General: Very Rev. Shane Baxter
- Judicial Vicar: Very Rev. Kevin Badeaux
- Bishops emeritus: Curtis Guillory

Map
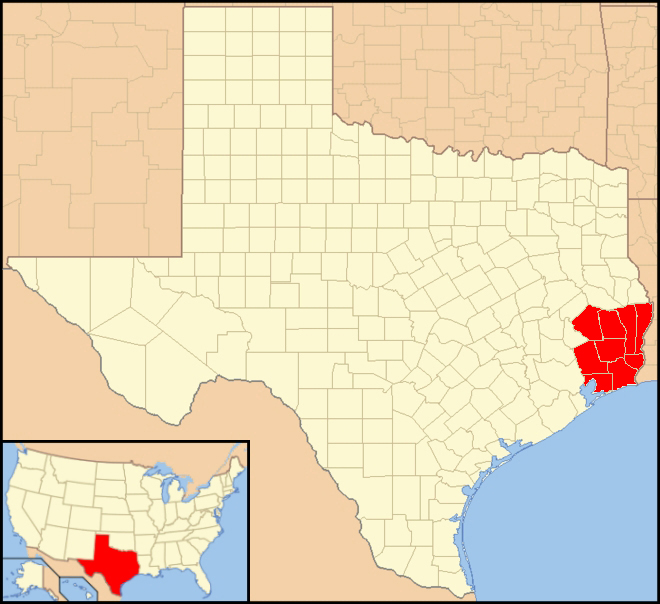

Website
- dioceseofbmt.org

The Diocese of Beaumont (Latin: Dioecesis Bellomontensis) is a diocese of the Catholic Church covering nine counties in the state of Texas in the United States. It is a suffragan see in the ecclesiastical province of the metropolitan Archdiocese of Galveston-Houston. St. Anthony Cathedral Basilica serves as the cathedral church.

== History ==
=== 1690 to 1900 ===
The first Catholic mission in Texas, then part of the Spanish colony of New Spain was San Francisco de los Tejas. It was founded by Franciscan Father Damián Massanet in 1690 in the Weches area. The priests left the mission after three years, then established a second mission, Nuestro Padre San Francisco de los Tejas. near present-day Alto in 1716.

In 1839, after the 1836 founding of the Texas Republic, Pope Gregory XVI erected the prefecture apostolic of Texas, covering its present-day area. The prefecture was elevated to a vicariate apostolic in 1846, the year that Texas became an American state. In 1847, the vicariate became the Diocese of Galveston. The Beaumont area would remain part of several Texas dioceses for the next 119 years.

In 1880, St. Louis Parish was founded in Beaumont, the first in the city. Fifteen years later, the parish started St. Louis School, the first Catholic School in Beaumont. Today it is the St. Anthony Cathedral Basilica School.

In 1897, successful businessman Bill Fletcher funded the construction of the first hospital in Beaumont. Wounded in the foot in 1861 during the American Civil War, he received attentive care from the Sisters of Charity at his hospital in Augusta, Georgia. Himself a Protestant, years later he wanted to repay the kindness of the Sisters. The Sisters of Charity opened Hotel Dieu Hospital in1898.

=== 1900 to 2000 ===
The first Catholic Parish in Port Arthur, St. Mary's, was founded in 1903. In 1928, St. Mary's Hospital was established in Port Arthur by the Sisters of Charity of the Incarnate Word. The Sisters of Charity of the Incarnate Word in 1962 opened St. Elizabeth Hospital in Beaumont. Today it is Christus Southeast Texas - St. Elizabeth Hospital.

On September 29, 1966, Pope Paul VI established the Diocese of Beaumont and appointed Vincent Harris of Galveston-Houston as its first bishop. During the 1960s, Harris criticized the Knights of Columbus councils in the diocese that refused to admit African-Americans. In 1971, Harris was appointed coadjutor bishop of the Diocese of Austin.

Pope Paul VI in 1971 named Bishop Warren Boudreaux of the Diocese of Lafayette in Louisiana to replace Harris. In 1974, Boudreaux began an outreach effort to people who made their living harvesting seafood and working on ships. After the end of the Vietnam War in 1975, the diocese received national recognition for its resettlement of refugees from what was then South Vietnam. Boudreaux was named bishop of the Diocese of Houma-Thibodaux in 1977.

Bishop Bernard J. Ganter of the Diocese of Tulsa was the third bishop of Beaumont, appointed by Paul VI in 1977. As bishop, Ganter established five new parishes, including the first Vietnamese-language parish in the United States. He initiated the permanent diaconate in the diocese and ordained 36 men as priests between 1979 and 1992. Ganter died in 1993.

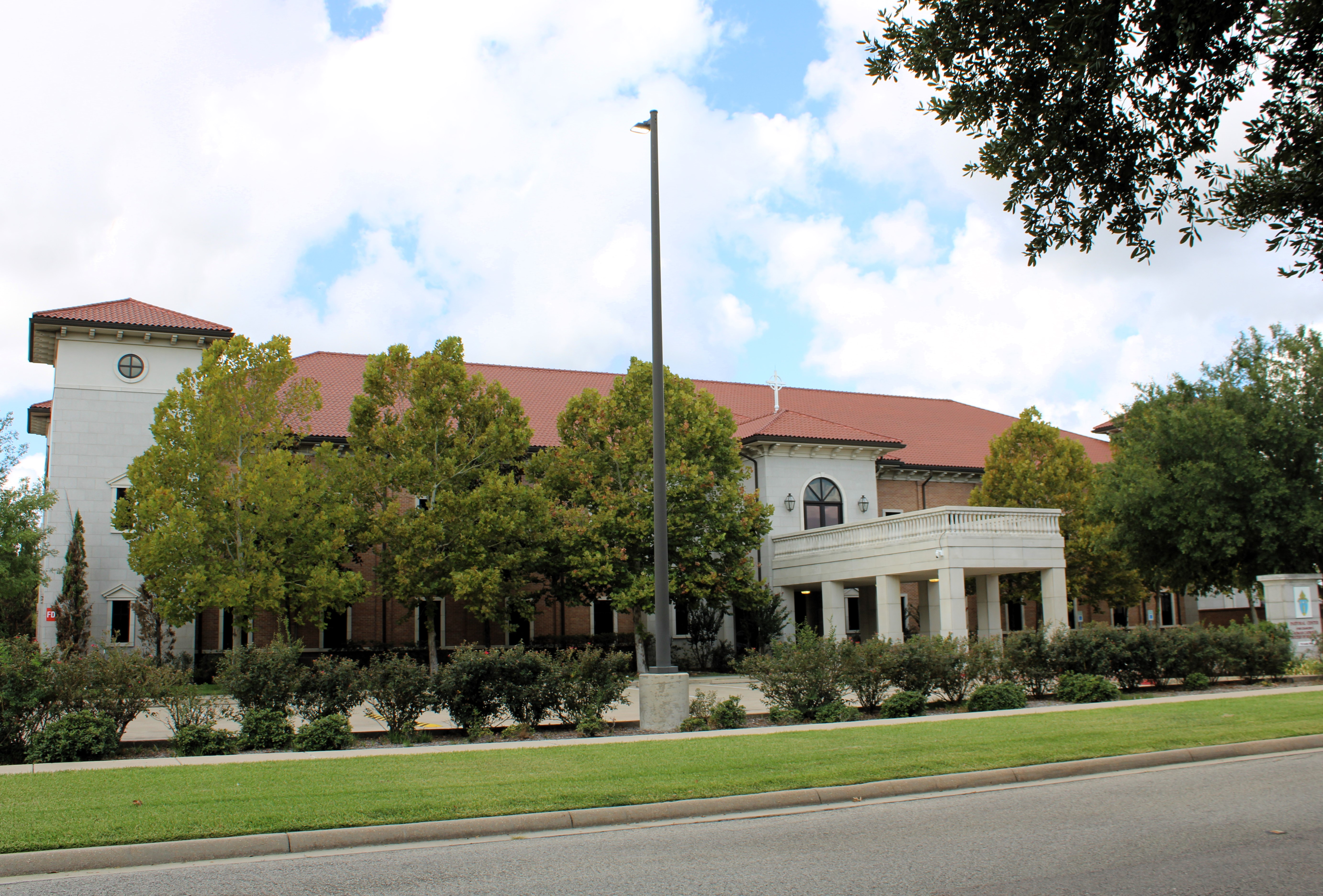
Diocesan Pastoral Center, Beaumont, Texas (2023)

In 1994, Auxiliary Bishop Joseph Anthony Galante of the Archdiocese of San Antonio became the next bishop of Beaumont, appointed by Pope John Paul II. Five years later, Galante was named coadjutor bishop of the Diocese of Dallas.

=== 2000 to present ===
Auxiliary Bishop Curtis J. Guillory of the Diocese of Galveston-Houston was named by Pope John Paul II to replace Galante in 2000. Guillory created the Catholic Foundation of the Diocese of Beaumont and started a capital campaign for it. He retired as bishop of Beaumont in 2020.

David Arceneaux of Nederland, Texas, sued the Diocese of Beaumont in 2010, claiming that he had been sexually abused by two diocesan priests, August Pucar and Roger Thibodeaux, when he was a minor. Pucar was removed from ministerial duties in 2006 and ordered to a life of penance and prayer in 2007. Thibodeaux resigned from the ministry in 2002. In 2019, the diocese issued a list of 13 clergy, living and deceased, with credible accusations of sexual abuse of minors.

David Toups from the Diocese of St. Petersburg was named bishop of Beaumont by Pope Francis in 2020.

== Bishops ==
1. Vincent Madeley Harris (1966–1971), appointed Coadjutor Bishop of Austin
2. Warren Louis Boudreaux (1971–1977), appointed Bishop of Houma-Thibodaux
3. Bernard J. Ganter (1977–1993)
4. Joseph Anthony Galante (1994–2000), appointed Coadjutor Bishop of Dallas and later Bishop of Camden
5. Curtis J. Guillory, SVD (2000–2020)
6. David Toups (2020–present)

== Education ==
As of 2026, the Diocese of Beaumont has five schools. Its one high school, Monsignor Kelly Catholic High School, is located in Beaumont.

== Coat of arms ==
Coat of arms of Diocese of Beaumont
Notes Arms was designed and adopted when the diocese was erected Adopted 1966 Escutcheon The diocesan arms consists of a blue field on which is seen, issuing from the base of the shield, a golden (yellow) hill. On this hill is a golden (yellow) vase that is charged with Chi Rho in red. Above the vase are a silver (white) star between two silver (white) roses. Symbolism The golden (yellow) hill is to cant, or play on, the name of the see city of Beaumont: "beautiful hill." The vase signifies an oil vial that stores the sacred oils used in the administration of the sacraments. The vase also refers to the oil reserves of oil that constitute the region's oil extraction industry. Above the vase are a silver (white) star between two silver (white) roses. The star comes from the Texas flag and seal, "The Lone Star State." The roses come from the coat of arms of the Diocese of Galveston-Houston, from which the Diocese of Beaumont was erected in 1966.
