= Holy Family Cathedral (Tulsa, Oklahoma) =

- Cathedral of the Holy Family
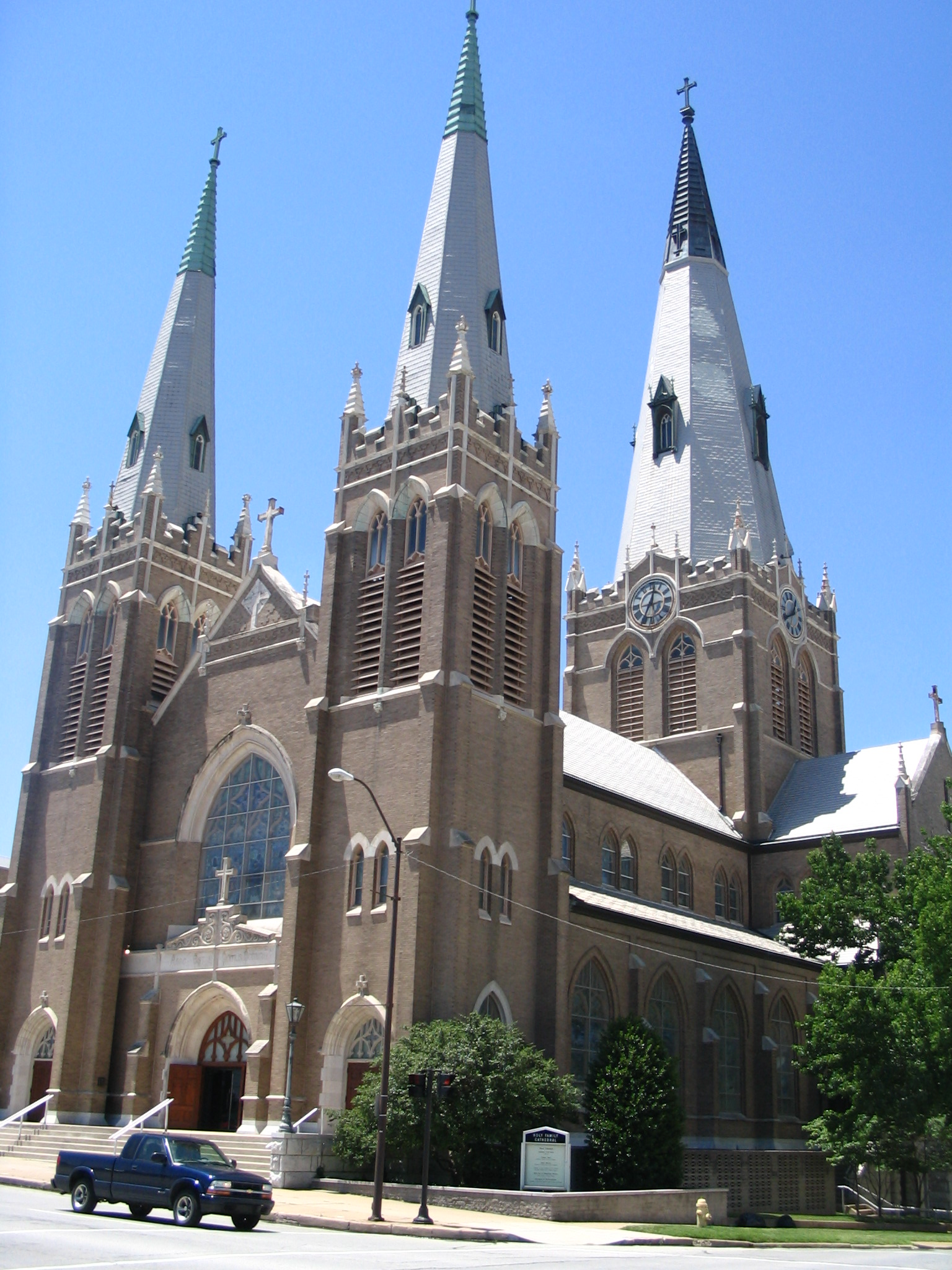
- Holy Family Cathedral
- Location: 810 South Boulder Avenue, Tulsa, Oklahoma
- Country: United States
- Denomination: Roman Catholic
- Website: www.tulsacathedral.com

History
- Founder: Rev. William Ketcham
- Dedication: 1914

Architecture
- Functional status: Active
- Architect(s): J.P. Curtin (Curtin, Winkler, and Macdonald)
- Architectural type: Cathedral
- Style: Neo-Gothic
- Groundbreaking: May 23, 1912

Specifications
- Capacity: 800
- Height: 240 ft (73 m)

Administration
- Diocese: Diocese of Tulsa

Clergy
- Bishop: David Konderla
- Rector: Very Rev. Brian O'Brien
- Holy Family Cathedral, Rectory, and School
- U.S. National Register of Historic Places
- Coordinates: 36°08′52″N 95°59′24″W
- Built: 1912–1927
- Architect: Curtin, J.P.; et al.
- Architectural style: Gothic Revival, Classical Revival
- NRHP reference No.: 82003704
- Added to NRHP: February 11, 1982

The Cathedral of the Holy Family is a cathedral of the Roman Catholic Church in the United States. It is the mother church of the Diocese of Tulsa and is the seat of the bishop. It is located at 810 South Boulder Avenue in the city of Tulsa in the state of Oklahoma. The parish chose architect J.P. Curtin of the Tulsa firm Curtin, Winkler, and Macdonald to design the church. Curtin was chosen over architect William P. Ginther of Akron, Ohio, who built many Roman Catholic churches throughout the Midwest. Ginther designed an alternate plan for the church trustees who had concerns about Curtin's design. All that remains of Ginther's work is a set of blueprints.

Construction on the current structure began May 23, 1912 and Mass dedicating the church was on April 1, 1914. It was the tallest building in Tulsa until the Mayo Hotel was built in 1923. The cathedral is also the site of the Holy Family Cathedral School, an educational institution for students from pre-school to twelfth grade.

The Diocese of Tulsa was established in 1973. Buildings at this site were listed on the National Register of Historic Places February 11, 1982. The NRIS number is 82003704.

== History ==
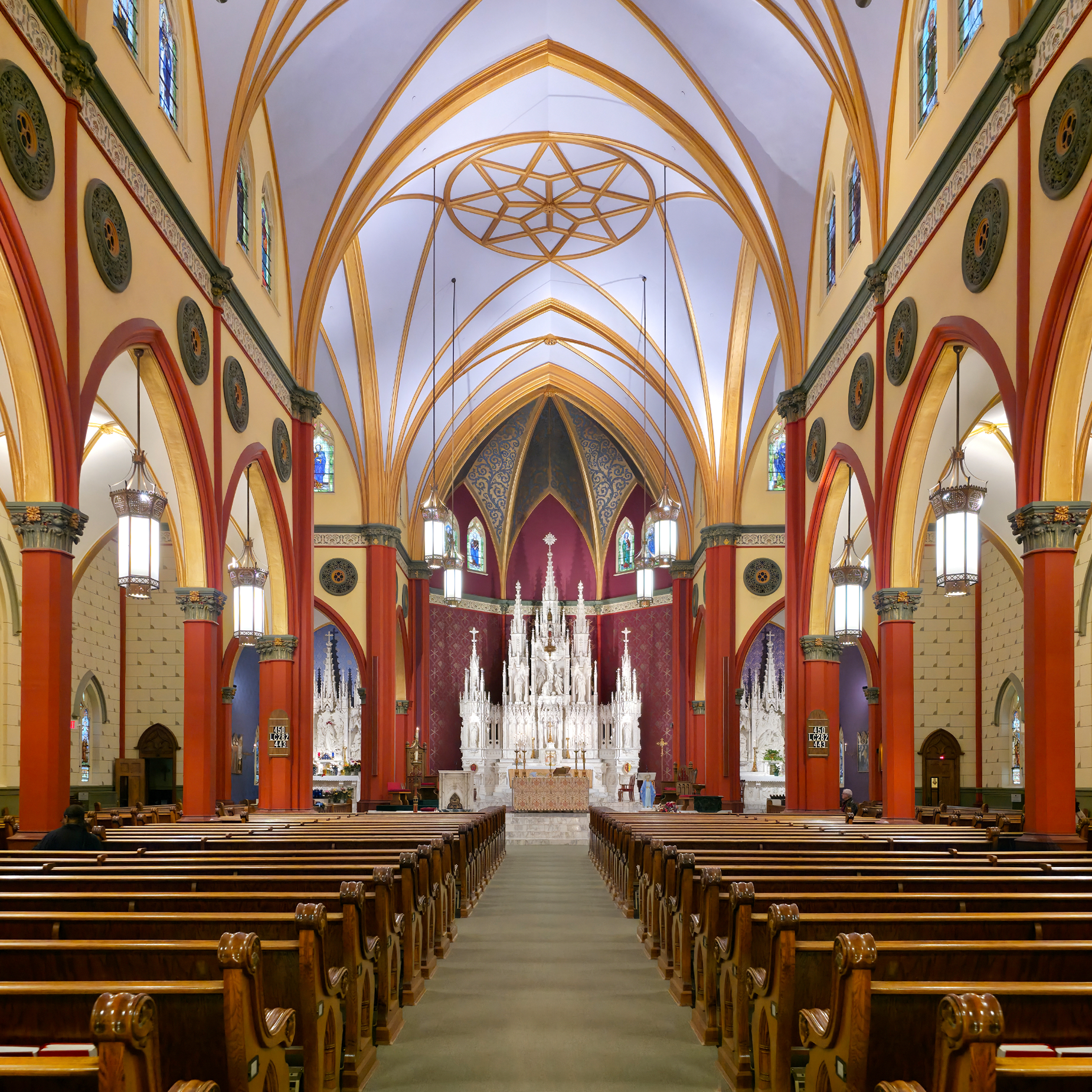
Cathedral interior

=== Holy Family Church ===
About 1890, the Rev. Wm Ketcham, the Roman Catholic pastor of Muskogee (then part of Indian Territory), visited Tulsa from time to time to say Mass in a private residence. He and his superior, Bishop Theophile Meerschaert, then vicar apostolic of Oklahoma, obtained permission from the Creek Indian tribal chief to build a church. However, no building was constructed until several years later.

Beginning in November 1897, the Rev. Charles Van Hulse visited Tulsa (then also part of Indian Territory) once a month to hold Roman Catholic church services in a private residence. At the start of 1899, a subscription drive raised pledges of $1,400 for the purpose of building a church. A contract was let in May, 1899 and the building was dedicated on September 10, 1899.

The Rev. Theophilius Van Hulse succeeded his brother in November 1900, and remained in Tulsa until 1906 when he was succeeded by the Rev. John G. Heiring, who oversaw plans to expand the church facilities. This included expanding the rectory and the school.

=== Holy Family Cathedral ===
By 1910, the church had outgrown its original capacity. Father Heiring turned his attention to building a new complex at the intersection of Eighth and Boulder, the present location. (Note: 11/01/2019)

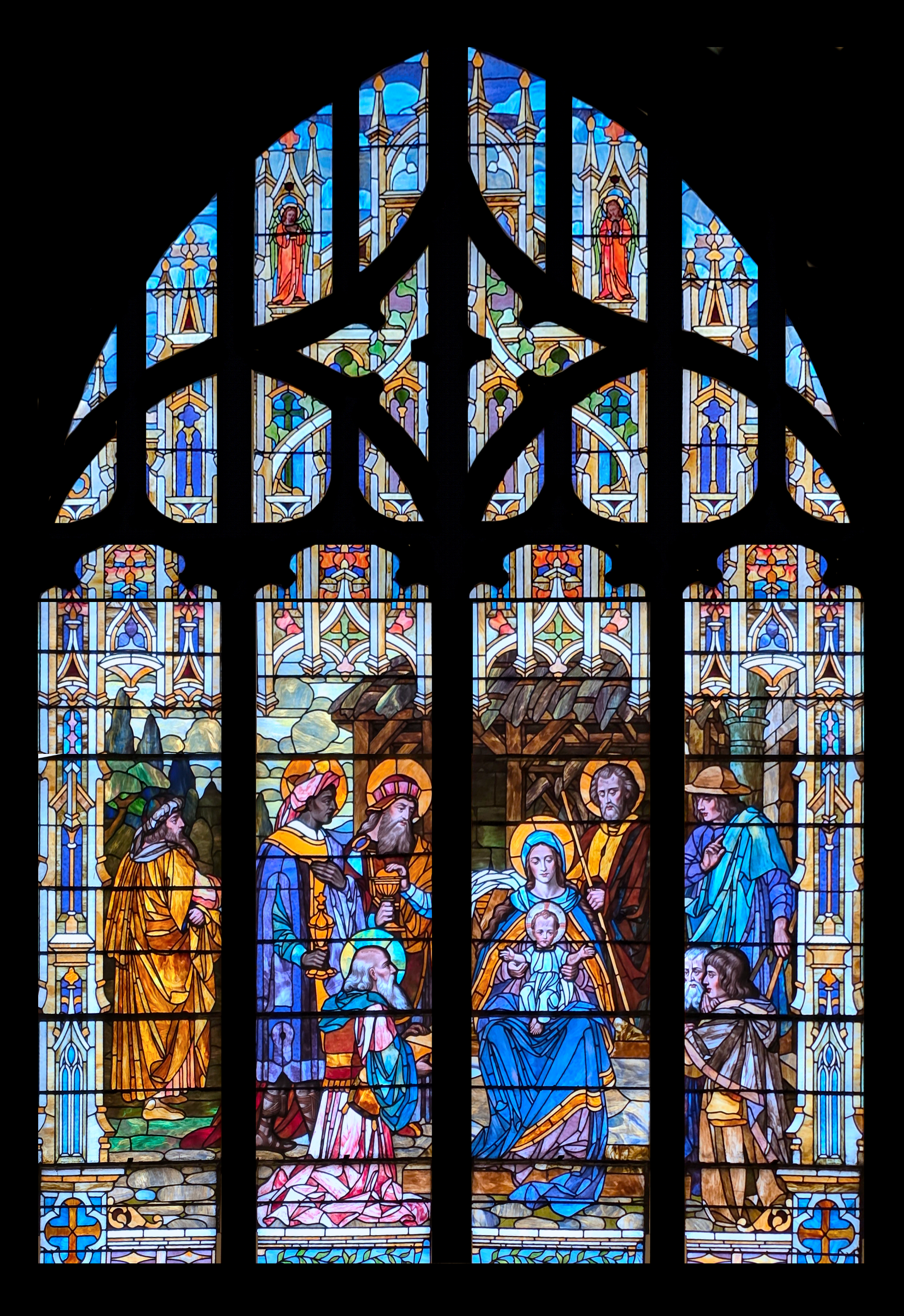
Adoration of the Magi by the Daprato Company after Franz Mayer

Construction of the sanctuary was completed in only two years with construction of the rectory beginning five years later, in 1919.

The cathedral contains a cycle of stained glass windows based on the life of Christ originally designed by Franz Meyer of Munich and manufactured by the Daprato Company.

=== Holy Family School ===
The history of Holy Family School is intertwined with that of the church. Tulsa Catholics petitioned Bishop Meerschaert to establish a Catholic school in Tulsa. In 1899, Mother Katharine Drexel (later canonized), an heiress to the Drexel banking family of Philadelphia, responded to the request by providing funds to construct St. Theresa's Institute for Creek Indian Girls. Mother Katharine intended the school to benefit Indian and African American children of the Oklahoma and Indian Territories but she allowed children of all races. The initial loan was repaid by 1902 and the school was renamed Holy Family School, adopting the same patrons as the church.

Three Sisters of Mount Carmel came from New Orleans to teach at the new school. They were replaced in 1902 by Sisters of Divine Providence from San Antonio.

In January 2020, Holy Family Cathedral School transitioned to a classical Catholic school.

== See also ==
- List of Catholic cathedrals in the United States
- List of cathedrals in the United States
- Roman Catholic Diocese of Tulsa
- Bishop Edward James Slattery
- Bishop David Konderla
