= William K. Warren Sr. =

American businessman (1897–1990)

- Born: William Kelly Warren; December 3, 1897; Nashville, Tennessee, U.S.
- Died: June 11, 1990 (aged 92); Tulsa, Oklahoma, U.S.
- Occupation: Businessman
- Known for: Philanthropy
- Spouse: Natalie Overall (m. 1921)

William Kelly Warren Sr. (December 3, 1897 – June 11, 1990) was an American businessman and philanthropist who founded the Warren Petroleum Corporation of Delaware in 1922. He and his company (headquartered in Tulsa) soon became specialists in the production and marketing of liquefied petroleum gas, a byproduct of petroleum refining and natural gas purification. Warren sold his company to Gulf Oil Corporation in 1953 for $450 million, the largest such merger in the energy industry up to that time. Warren then turned his attention to philanthropy and established the Saint Francis Hospital system in Tulsa.

== Early life ==
Warren was born in Nashville, Tennessee, to Thomas Hines and Amelia Elizabeth Cecil Warren on December 3, 1897. Little has been published about his childhood and adolescence. One source says that he dropped out of school after eighth grade because of his father's death. A brief biography, published in 1987, when the Tulsa Historical Society inducted him into its hall of fame, indicates only that he struggled with poverty during those years, and that he had jobs as "... a newspaper carrier, a Western Union messenger, a peanut vendor in a baseball park, a drug store employee, a door-to-door salesman and even a dance hall instructor." While living in Nashville, where he attended parochial schools. Apparently he decided to leave Nashville in 1915, and went to work as a railroad clerk, earning $40 a month. According to the Encyclopedia of Oklahoma History and Culture, he befriended Myrtle (Mrs. Daniel A.) McDougal of Sapulpa, Oklahoma, who advised him to go west to seek his fortune. Warren caught a train to Sapulpa in February 1916, where he went to work briefly on a rail line serving the oil boom towns of Depew and Shamrock. That job only lasted five days, when he quit and began learning everything he could about the oil business by working a variety of jobs. He worked for Gypsy Oil Company, Gilliland Oil Company, Gulf Oil Corporation, Margay Oil Corporation, and McMan Oil and Gas Company in Oklahoma, Texas, and Louisiana.

Warren worked for a few years as assistant to Patrick J. Hurley, who was then vice president of Gilliland Oil Company.

== Warren Petroleum Corporation ==
Warren resigned in 1922 to found his own oil company, Warren Petroleum Company of Delaware. He made his headquarters in Tulsa, Oklahoma, with himself and his wife as the only people on the payroll. His firm concentrated on producing and marketing liquefied petroleum gas (LPG), a byproduct of natural gas processing. Warren organized the Western Gasoline Company, which he reorganized as the Warren Petroleum Company of Oklahoma in 1932, and then into Warren Petroleum Corporation in 1937. In 1930, he bought the domestic gasoline production facilities of Amerada Hess Corporation. Warren Petroleum, along with Monterey Oil Company and J. R. Butler founded the Transwestern Pipeline Company on March 11, 1957. On November 10, 1953, Gulf Oil Corporation bought Warren Petroleum Corporation for $420 million. The deal was called the largest exchange of money in the industry until then. In 1966, Warren served as president of the International Petroleum Exposition. (Note: After Chevron Corporation bought Gulf in 1984, it made Warren a division of Chevron.)

== Later life and philanthropy ==
During a fund drive by the Catholic Diocese of Tulsa, Warren agreed to donate $15,000 for St. Johns Hospital. He stipulated that no announcement of the gift would be made and that all notices should be sent to his office. He said that his wife was just as good a Methodist as he was a Catholic, and that they had agreed that whatever he gave to his church, she could make an equal donation to hers. However, an acknowledgement of the gift was sent to his home instead.

After selling his company to Gulf, Warren devoted much of his time, energy and money to philanthropic activities. In 1945 he created the William K. Warren Foundation. The Foundation gives financial support to non-profit organizations for charitable, scientific and health programs. Recipient organizations are primarily Catholic and located in and around Tulsa.

The Foundation established the Saint Francis Hospital in Tulsa in 1959 and Laureate Psychiatric Hospital and Clinic in 1989. The hospital opened in 1960, and was operated by the Sisters of the Most Precious Blood from 1960 to 1969, and presently by the Religious Sisters of Mercy of Alma, Michigan. It opened the Laureate Psychiatric Clinic and Hospital in 1989.

The Foundation also financed the first Warren Clinic facility in 1988 as part of the Saint Francis Health System with the goal of expanding the base of available primary care physicians. Since then it has steadily grown to more than 70 locations and over 350 physicians who provide high quality health care to patients in northeastern Oklahoma.

In 2007, the Foundation funded the expansion of the Saint Francis Health System to include two new facilities: Saint Francis Hospital South, a 96-bed hospital to accommodate the growing population in the southern part of Tulsa; and the Laureate Institute for Brain Research, a clinical neuroscience research institute dedicated to expanding the knowledge about the underlying pathogenetic features of mental disorders.

Warren also donated generously to the University of Notre Dame. According to the Notre Dame website, Saint Liam Hall (referring to Saint William of York) was named in honor of W. K. Warren Sr. and the William K. and Natalie O. Warren golf course at Notre Dame is named after Mr. and Mrs. W. K. Warren Sr.

== Legacy ==
William Warren Sr. was inducted into the Oklahoma Hall of Fame in 1961, two years after the induction of his wife in 1959.

== Marriage and family ==
While living in Nashville, Warren had met Natalie Overall, the daughter of a Methodist preacher. The couple carried on a long distance romance while he was moving around in oil company. They finally married on September 21, 1921.

Natalie Warren died in Saint Francis Hospital in Tulsa at the age of 97 on September 4, 1996.

Together, they had six daughters and one son: Dorothy, Natalie, Marilyn, Patricia, Elizabeth (Libby), Jean and William. Their son, William K. Warren Jr., also a successful businessman and philanthropist who chaired the family foundation for years after his father's retirement, lives in Tulsa.
