= Diocese of Tulsa =

Latin Catholic ecclesiastical jurisdiction in Oklahoma, US

Coordinates: 36°07′53″N 95°56′14″W

Diocese of Tulsa Dioecesis Tulsensis
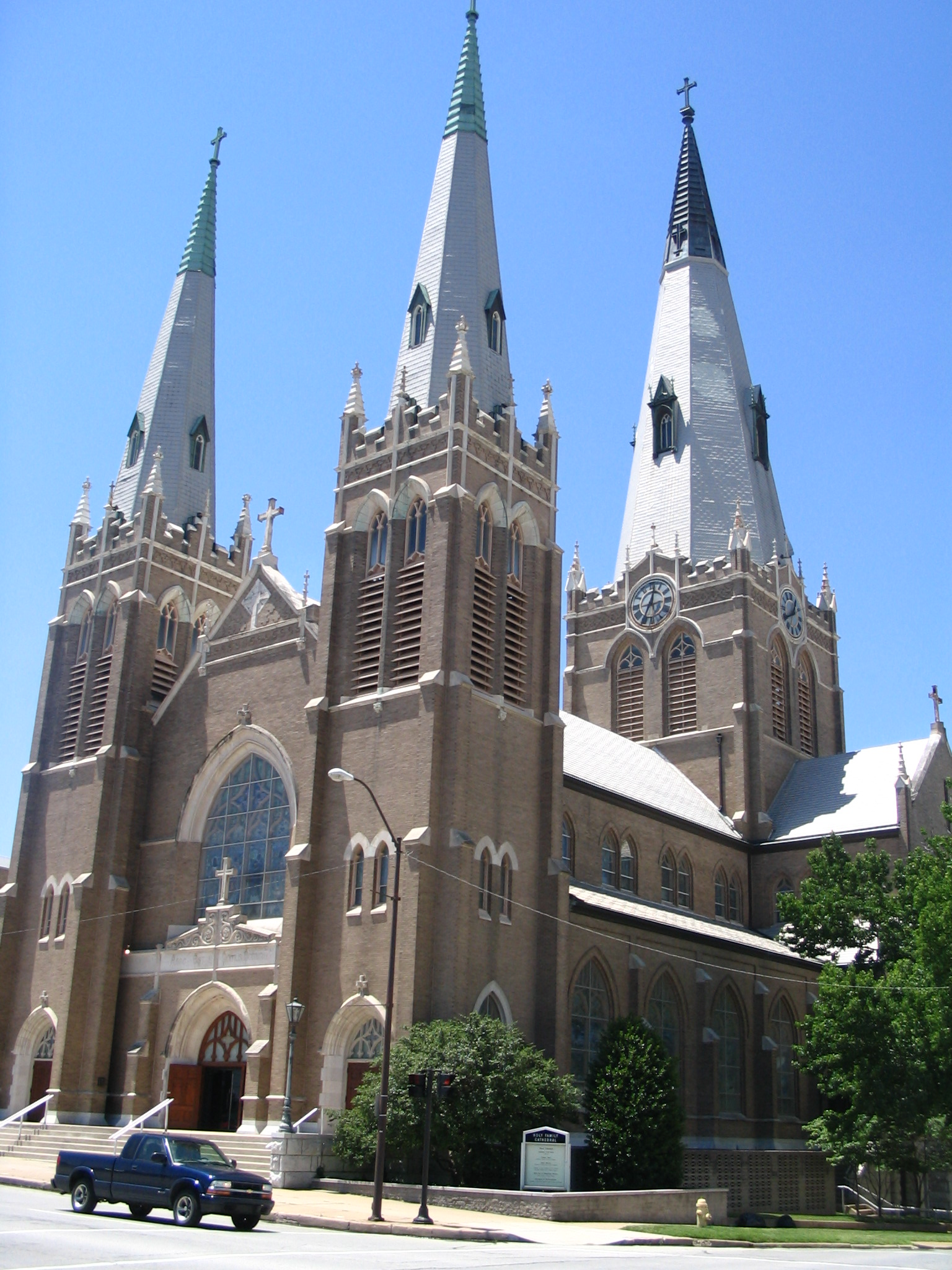
- Holy Family Cathedral

- Coat of Arms of the Diocese of Tulsa

Location
- Country: United States
- Territory: Eastern Oklahoma
- Ecclesiastical province: Oklahoma City

Statistics
- Area: 26,417 sq mi (68,420 km^{2})
- Population: 56,094 (3.5%)

Information
- Denomination: Catholic
- Sui iuris church: Latin Church
- Rite: Roman Rite
- Established: December 13, 1972
- Cathedral: Holy Family Cathedral
- Patron saint: Holy Family

Current leadership
- Pope: Leo XIV
- Bishop: David Konderla
- Metropolitan Archbishop: Paul Stagg Coakley

Map
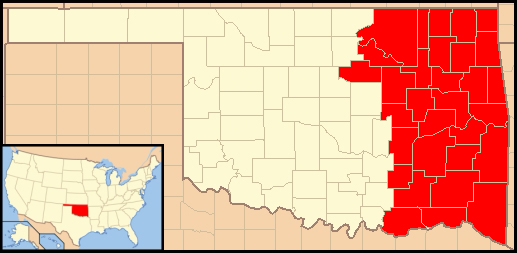

Website
- dioceseoftulsa.org

The Diocese of Tulsa also called the Diocese of Tulsa and Eastern Oklahoma (Latin: Dioecesis Tulsensis) is a diocese of the Catholic Church in the eastern part of Oklahoma in the United States. It is a suffragan diocese of the metropolitan Archdiocese of Oklahoma City. The mother church is Holy Family Cathedral in Tulsa. The bishop is David Konderla.

== Statistics ==
The Diocese of Tulsa covers 26,417 square miles (68,420 km^{2}) over 31 counties in eastern Oklahoma – including the most populous county, Tulsa County.

== History ==
=== 1800 to 1870 ===
The first Catholic presence in present-day Oklahoma may have been the expeditions of the Spanish explorers Francisco Vásquez y Coronado and Hernando de Soto in 1541 and 1542. However, there is no evidence of missionary activity in the region until the 1830s. With the passage by the US Congress of the Indian Removal Act of 1830, tens of thousands of Native Americans from the southern and midwestern states were moved west to the Indian Territory, which included Oklahoma.

By 1834, the Diocese of St. Louis had gained jurisdiction for the Indian Territory. Charles Van Quickenborne, a missionary Jesuit priest, came from the St. Louis area to visit the Claremore band of the Osage Nation near Cabin Creek. Jurisdiction over the Oklahoma area was passed to the new Diocese of Little Rock in 1843. Priests from a mission in Neosho County, Kansas, in 1847 started visiting the tribe and US Army posts in the regions. Other priests visited from missions in Texas and Arkansas.

=== 1870 to 1900 ===
A priest from Arkansas, Michael Smyth in 1872 helped Irish workers building the Missouri-Kansas-Texas railroad to construct St. Patrick's the first Catholic Church in the Indian Territory in Atoka.In 1876, Pope Pius IX erected the Apostolic Prefecture of Indian Territory, removing the Indian Territory from the Diocese of Little Rock. The pope named Isadore Robot as the first prefect of the territory.In 1885, St. John the Evangelist Parish was erected in McAlester, the first Catholic parish in that community.

In 1890, the US Government separated western Oklahoma from the Indian Territory, founding the Oklahoma Territory. The Tulsa area remained as part of the now-smaller Indian Territory.In 1891, Pope Leo XIII created the Apostolic Vicariate of Indian Territory, continuing its jurisdiction over the Oklahoma and Indian Territories. The Church of the Assumption was the first parish in Muskogee, established by the priest in 1891. The first parish in Tulsa, Holy Family, opened in 1899.

=== 1900 to 1972 ===
In 1905, Pope Pius X erected the Diocese of Oklahoma City, covering both the Oklahoma Territory and Indian Territory. Two years later, the two territories were admitted to statehood as the State of Oklahoma.

Pope Pius XI renamed the Diocese of Oklahoma City as the Diocese of Oklahoma City-Tulsa in 1930. This was due to the population growth of Tulsa and its surrounding communities. Bishop Francis Kelley of Oklahoma City became the first bishop of the new diocese. The Tulsa area would remain part of this diocese for the next 42 years. In 1936, St. Anne Parish was established in Broken Arrow, the first parish in that community.

In 1960, William K. Warren, Sr., founder of the Warren Petroleum Company, donated the funds to open St. Francis Hospital in Tulsa. It is today St. Francis Medical Center.

=== 1972 to present ===
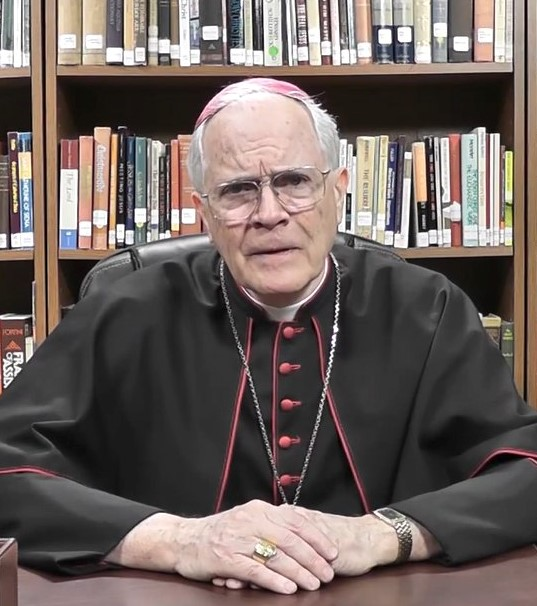
Bishop Slattery (2013)

Pope Paul VI erected the Diocese of Tulsa on December 13, 1972, removing eastern Oklahoma from what became the Archdiocese of Oklahoma City. The pope named Bernard Ganter of the Diocese of Galvaston as the first bishop of Tulsa. He served in Tulsa for four years before being named bishop of the Diocese of Beaumont.

The next bishop of Tulsa was Eusebius J. Beltran from the Diocese of Atlanta, appointed in 1978. Beltran was appointed archbishop of Oklahoma City in 1992.

Edward Slattery replaced Beltran in 1993. Slattery served for 23 years before retiring in 2016. That same year, Pope Francis named David Konderla as the new bishop of Tulsa. In 2020, the diocese withdrew from the Oklahoma Council of Churches because that Council would not explicitly condemn abortion rights for women.

As of 2026, Konderla is the bishop of Austin.

=== Sex abuse ===
The diocese in October 2019 released a list of 11 clergy with credible accusations of sexual abuse of minors dating back to 1973.

== Bishops ==
=== Bishops of Tulsa ===
1. Bernard J. Ganter (1972–1977), appointed Bishop of Beaumont
2. Eusebius J. Beltran (1978–1992), appointed Archbishop of Oklahoma City
3. Edward James Slattery (1993–2016)
4. David Konderla (2016–present)

=== Other diocesan priests who became bishops ===
- Peter Bryan Wells, appointed titular Archbishop and nuncio in 2016
- Daniel Henry Mueggenborg, appointed auxiliary bishop of Seattle in 2017

== Education ==
The superintendent of the diocese is David Dean.

=== High schools ===
- Bishop Kelley High School – Tulsa
- Cascia Hall Preparatory School – Tulsa

=== Liturgical institute ===
Te Deum Institute of Sacred Liturgy

== Ecclesiastical province ==
See: List of the Catholic bishops of the United States#Province of Oklahoma City
