= Medical facilities in Tulsa =

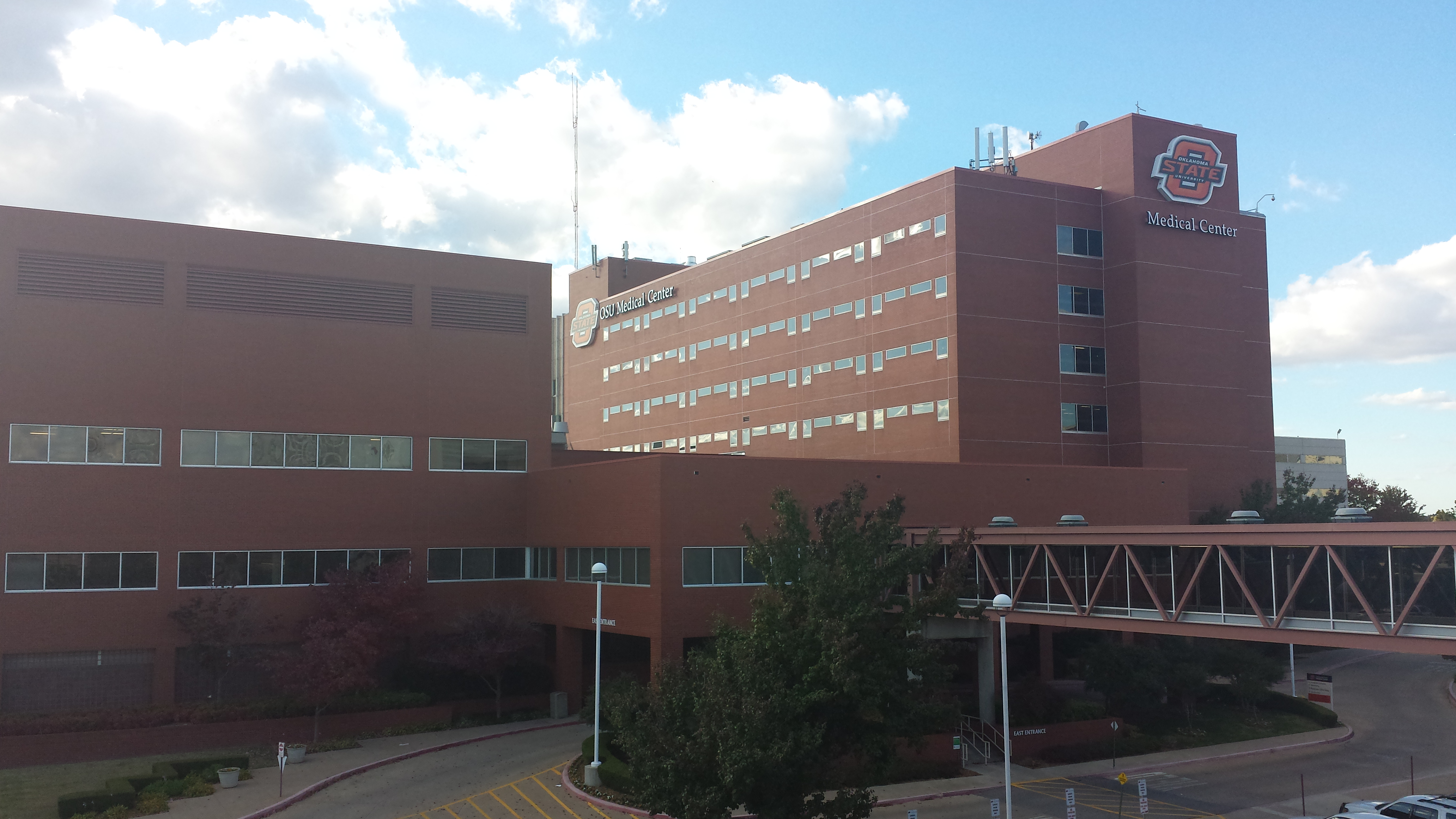
Oklahoma State University Medical Center, a hospital located in Tulsa, Oklahoma, on November 1, 2013

== Earliest hospitals ==
In 1900, a smallpox epidemic struck Tulsa. Surgeon Fred S. Clinton and four Tulsa businessmen (J. H. McBirney, Sam H. McBirney, Vic Pranter and Jack Dietz) set up a hospital for contagious patients in a six-room cottage near Archer Avenue and Greenwood Street. Clinton was the acknowledged leader, while the other four each invested fifty dollars to equip the facility and served as trustees. After the epidemic had passed, the facility was used for other types of patients. The facility closed after only one year of operation, apparently without even receiving a formal name.

After closure of the Archer Avenue facility, Clinton recognized the need to establish a real hospital for the rapidly growing city. He called town meetings and gave speeches for five years. In 1906, he and several other doctors organized and incorporated the Tulsa Hospital Association. He was elected president, Charles LaFayette Reeder was Secretary and C. Z. Wiley was Treasurer. The association leased a two and one-half story residence on North Cheyenne, where it opened the Tulsa Hospital. In December 1906, the hospital moved to a ten-room building at the corner of West 5th Street and Lawton Avenue. The hospital had 40 beds, a private ambulance, long-distance telephone service and was located on a street car line. The first nursing school was established at the Tulsa Hospital. It was directed by Mrs. Henrietta Ziegler. The first class of four nurses graduated in 1910. Clinton remained as president until 1915, when control was sold to other interests. This hospital closed after World War I.

== Oklahoma Hospital ==
In 1915, Clinton headed a new group of professional and civic leaders in establishing the Oklahoma Hospital at West 9th Street and Jackson Avenue. This was a new brick building with a capacity of 50 patients and having a three-room surgery. (Note: The OSU history notes that the 9th and Jackson building was the first fireproof and really modern hospital in Tulsa.) The hospital did not open until late in 1916, because World War I interrupted the supply of many critical materials. Mrs. Henrietta Ziegler followed Clinton from the Tulsa Hospital and created a new nursing school at Oklahoma Hospital.

Tulsa Hospital declined after the construction of St. Johns Hospital in the 1920s. It was eventually converted and converted to a facility for treating nervous and mental disorders. In 1943, it was purchased by a group of osteopathic physicians and became the 200-bed Oklahoma Osteopathic Hospital.

== Oklahoma Osteopathic Hospital ==
OSU writes that the first osteopathic hospital in Tulsa was opened in 1924 at 14th and Peoria Ave. by C. D. Heasley, who named it the Tulsa Clinic Hospital. Three years later, Healey moved the facility to a 25-bed converted apartment building at 1321 South Peoria. The hospital was later sold and renamed Byrne Memorial Hospital. This hospital was owned and managed by Mrs. Bessie Byrne.

Clinton proposed to John W. Orman, president of the Osteopathic Hospital Founders Association, that the OHFA buy the 9th and Jackson building. (Note: Original members of the OHFA were: John W. Orman, president; C. D. Heasley, vice president; R. D. McCullough, secretary-treasurer; A. G. Reed; H. C. Baldwin; Paul Benien; John Halladay; C. P. Harth; Louis Shea; and L. A. Reiter.) In 1925, the building had been bought by the Delaware Baptist Convention and sold again later in 1933 during the depths of the depression. For several years prior to the mortgage foreclosure in 1942 it had become known as Tulsa General Hospital and West Side Hospital. The hospital became a non-profit and was renamed Tulsa Regional Medical Center. It was sold to Columbia/HCA, a for-profit company from Nashville, Tennessee in 1996, which sold it to Hillcrest Medical Center in 1999. It became part of the Oklahoma State University Medical Center in 2006.

== Morningside/Hillcrest complex ==
Morningside Hospital was created in 1918 because of an influenza epidemic. This hospital began in a brick building at 512 North Boulder Avenue. After the epidemic had subsided, additional money was raised and used to remodel and better equip the hospital. It soon became one of the city's leading institutions, attracting many younger physicians to its medical staff. An addition built in 1923–4, bringing the capacity to 80 beds. By 1925, Morningside was owned by Mr. and Mrs. William J. McNulty, who decided to build a new complex at 16th and Utica (the present site), which opened in February 1928.(Editor's Note: the hospital site was actually at 12th and Utica.)

The Great Depression caused the complex to become financially strapped. The business was reorganized as a community hospital in 1939, and renamed Hillcrest Hospital. It hired Bryce Twitty as the new Administrator.

Ardent Health Services, based in Nashville, Tennessee, bought the Hillcrest Health Care System in 2004 for a reported $281.2 million. In 2011, Hillcrest bought SouthCrest Hospital (Note: SouthCrest Hospital has since been renamed Hillcrest-South.) in Tulsa and Claremore Regional Hospital.

In 2012, Hillcrest hospital had 532 beds, and was still owned by Ardent Health Services. In early 2015, Ventas, Inc., a $35 billion Chicago-based real estate investment trust (REIT) that specializes in health care, bought the Hillcrest system from Ardent for $1.75 billion. (Note: Ventas' holdings include hospitals, medical office buildings, skilled nursing facilities and senior housing communities.)

== Ascension St. John Medical Center ==
A Roman Catholic order, Sisters of the Sorrowful Mother, intending to build a hospital, acquired a tract of land in 1919 at 21st Street and Utica Avenue. Fund raising drives started almost immediately. The groundbreaking ceremony occurred in February 1920 and featured General John J. Pershing. The initial funds proved inadequate and construction stopped. Another fundraising drive was held in February 1921 and work resumed in 1922. Now named Ascension St. John Medical Center, it admitted its first patients in 1924, while the facility was only partially complete. Another fundraising drive was needed to complete the facility in 1926.

Despite its financially troubled beginning, St. John not only survived, but grew to become the largest hospital in Tulsa. St. John Medical Center, located in an 11-story midtown center, employs nearly 700 doctors. It continues to operate until the present. A major expansion in 1957 included two more wings, a parking garage, a physical services building and a new residence for members of the order in charge of the complex. A more recent building program will replace all the pre-1945 facilities. A 10-story tower will serve most of the patient, visitor and staff personnel needs.

On Monday, 10 February 2020, Ascension St. John Medical Center's parent company, Ascension, kicked off a series of celebratory events, wrapping up a three-year national rebranding effort that includes unifying all of its hospitals under one name Previously, on April 1, 2013, St. John Health System (SJHC) issued the following press release regarding its decision to join Ascension Health: (Note: Ascension, based in St. Louis, Missouri claims to be the largest Catholic and non-profit system in the United States.)

As of April, 2013, Ascension St. John has eight hospitals in northeast Oklahoma and southeast Kansas.

- St. John Medical Center -Tulsa
- St. John - Owasso
- St. John - Broken Arrow,
- St. John - Sapulpa
- Jane Phillips Medical Center - Bartlesville
- Pawhuska City Hospital
- Sedan City Hospital
- Nowata Hospital

== Children's Medical Center ==
The Junior League of Tulsa established a convalescent home for crippled children in 1926 in a downtown building at 5th Street and Cincinnati Avenue. In 1928, the home moved to a large cottage at 4818 South Lewis and was renamed the Junior League Convalescent Center. The facility emphasized treatment of convalescing children, especially polio victims. In 1953, the name was changed to Children's Medical Center. In 1962, the center consolidated the functions of several agencies, including: the Tulsa Child Guidance Clinic, Sunnyside School, Child Study Clinic, Vocational Training Center. It continues to operate in the 21st century.

== Cancer Treatment Centers of America ==
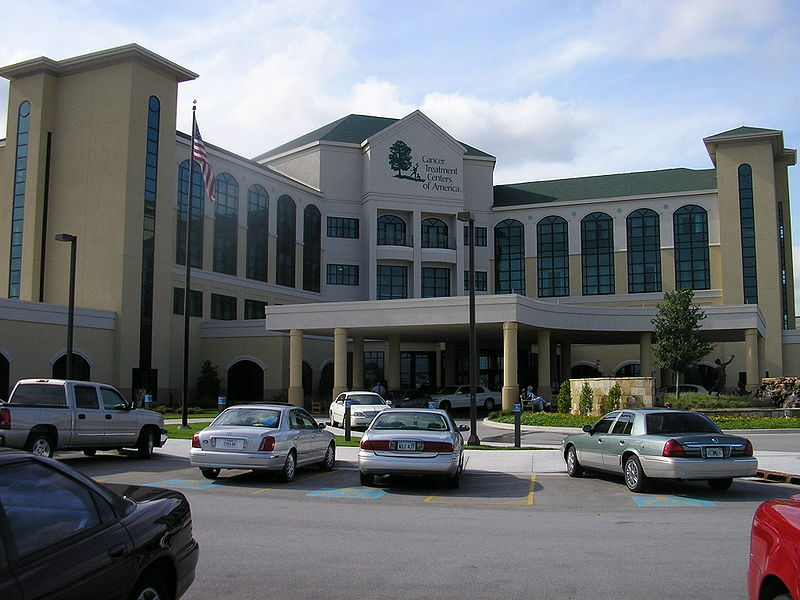
Cancer Treatment Center Tulsa Hospital, May 8, 2007.

Cancer Treatment Centers of America (CTCA) opened in Tulsa on May 7, 1990. This was the second facility for what would become a five-facility chain. The hospital originally occupied space in the former City of Faith complex (now CityPlex Towers), but moved to the Southwestern Regional Medical Center at 81st Street and Highway 169 on April 29, 1995. This hospital provides 195,845 square feet (18,194.6 m^{2}) of space.

== Doctors' Hospital/Columbia Doctors' Hospital ==
Doctors' Hospital was founded in 1964 by a group of 18 family practice doctors who were frustrated by a medical system that required them to turn their patients over to specialists when the patients needed to be treated at a hospital. In 1964, construction of Doctors' Hospital began at 2323 South Harvard Avenue. The non-profit hospital began operation August 29, 1966. By 2012, Doctors' Hospital was a 100-bed facility that occupied a three-story building on a 10 acres (40,000 m^{2}) tract of land. In June 2012, the hospital announced an expansion plan to add a 40-bed extended care facility, a 100-bed convalescent center and a multi-story professional office building. The original hospital has been sold and is now named Columbia Doctors' Hospital.

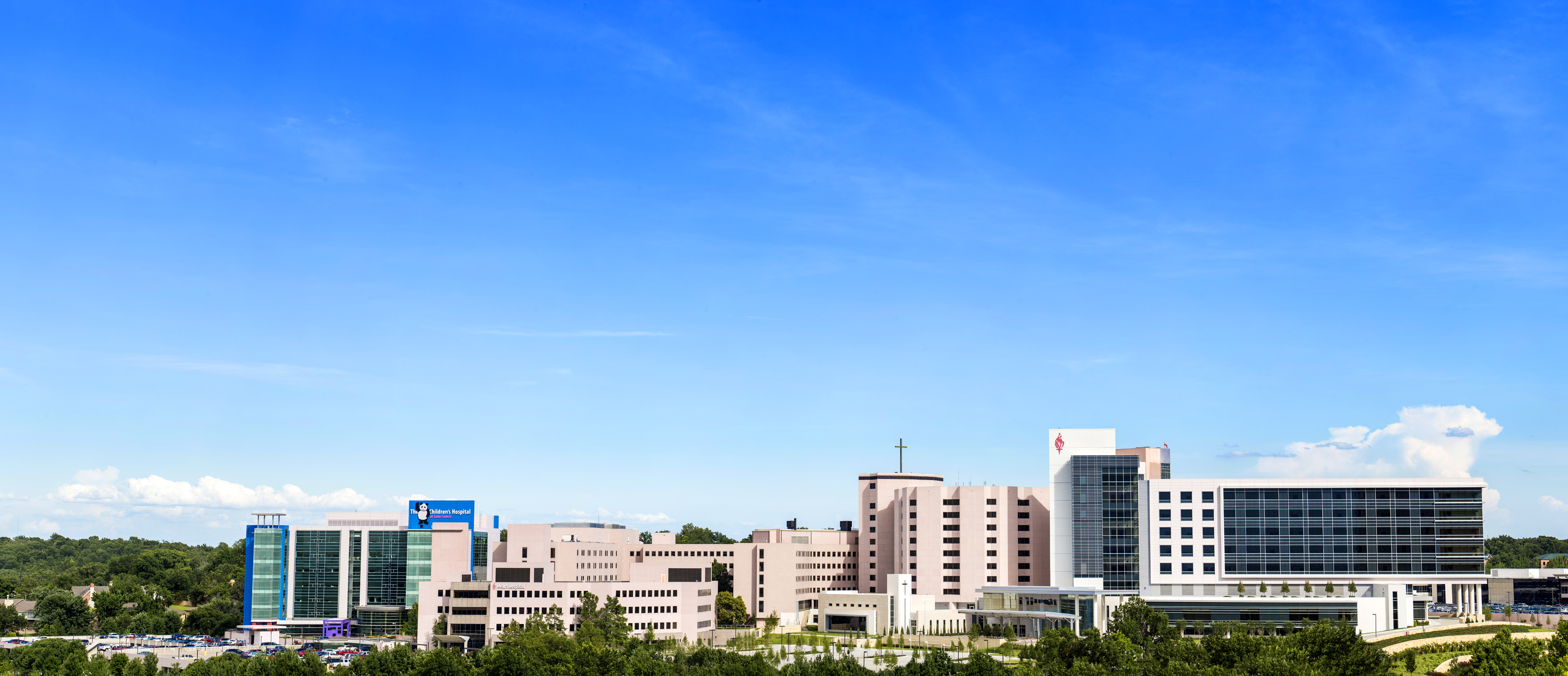
Saint Francis Hospital, Tulsa OK

== Saint Francis Health System ==
Founded in 1960 by Natalie O. and William K. Warren Sr., Saint Francis is a Catholic not-for-profit health system wholly owned and operated in Tulsa, Oklahoma, whose mission is to extend the presence and healing ministry of Christ in all we do. In 2024, Premier’s Pink AI recognized Saint Francis as one of the 15 Top Health Systems in the nation. The health system is anchored by the 1,100-bed Saint Francis Hospital, the 11th largest hospital in the United States, which includes a 162-bed Children's Hospital with the region's only level IV neonatal intensive care unit, a 168-bed heart hospital and Tulsa's leading trauma and emergency center. It was ranked the best hospital in Oklahoma by U.S. News & World Report in 2024 for the eighth consecutive year. Also part of the health system are Saint Francis Hospital South; Saint Francis Hospital Muskogee, Saint Francis Hospital Vinita; Saint Francis Glenpool; and Laureate Psychiatric Clinic and Hospital—a 90-bed private, psychiatric facility recognized nationally for its eating disorders program. Additionally, Saint Francis employs 360 physicians and 133 advanced practice providers through the Warren Clinic, which serves the region with more than 100 locations throughout eastern Oklahoma.

It also operates a home care division, which includes hospice, home health and durable medical equipment companies. In total, the organization has more than 9,500 employees, making it the largest eastern Oklahoma-based private employer.

The Saint Francis Health System includes:

- Saint Francis Hospital
- Saint Francis Hospital South
- Warren Clinic
- Saint Francis Children's Hospital
- The Heart Hospital at Saint Francis
- Laureate Psychiatric Clinic and Hospital
- Saint Francis Hospital Muskogee
- Saint Francis Hospital Vinita
- Saint Francis Glenpool
- Health Zone at Saint Francis

== Other hospitals ==
In 1921, the American Red Cross opened Maurice Willows Hospital in north Tulsa to help victims of the Tulsa race massacre. This facility was combined in 1932 into a larger hospital on Pine Street, known as Tulsa Hospital Number Two. It was renamed Moton Memorial Hospital in 1941. It closed in 1967, because it failed to qualify for Medicare benefits, but reopened the next year as Moton Health Center, and by 1983 is renamed Morton Comprehensive Health Service.

Other networks, such as Hillcrest Health System, operate a number of facilities in varying sizes.

Oklahoma Surgical Hospital operates from space in the Cityplex Towers.

Beginning in 2007, the city elected to renew a five-year contract with EMSA for ambulance service after a period of consideration to switch to the Tulsa Fire Department for providing such services.

== Defunct facilities ==
The Physicians and Surgeons Hospital opened in 1910 at Carson Avenue and 13th Street. It was founded by G. H. Butler, S. D. Hawley, W. Q. Conway and R. S. Wagner. It continued until the 1930s before closing.

Wade Sisler opened a now defunct Hospital for Bone and Joint Diseases in 1929 at 807 South Elgin Avenue. It later became a general hospital under the name Mercy Hospital.

Flower Hospital occupied the old Morningside building at 512 North Boulder from 1925 to 1941. The hospital closed, and the building was remodeled for use by the Tulsa County Health Department.

City of Faith Hospital, founded by preacher Oral Roberts, opened at 81st Street and Lewis Avenue in 1981. The hospital and its related medical school became insolvent and closed in 1989, with $25 million in debt. Both entities are now defunct. The buildings, known collectively as the Cityplex Towers, have largely been converted to commercial office use. However, Oklahoma Surgical Hospital continues to operate from that space.
