= Joseph Anthony Galante =

American Catholic prelate (1938–2019)

His Excellency, The Most Reverend Joseph Anthony Galante
- Bishop of Camden
- Church: Catholic Church; Latin Church
- Diocese: Camden
- Appointed: March 23, 2004
- Installed: April 30, 2004
- Term ended: January 8, 2013
- Predecessor: Nicholas Anthony DiMarzio
- Successor: Dennis J. Sullivan
- Other post: Bishop Emeritus of Camden (2013‍–‍2019)
- Previous posts: Auxiliary bishop of San Antonio (1992‍–‍1994); Bishop of Beaumont (1994‍–‍1999); Coadjutor Bishop of Dallas (1999‍–‍2004)

Orders
- Ordination: May 16, 1964 by John Krol
- Consecration: December 11, 1992 by Patrick Flores, Francis B. Schulte, and Francis X. DiLorenzo

Personal details
- Born: July 2, 1938 Philadelphia, Pennsylvania, U.S.
- Died: May 25, 2019 (aged 80) Somers Point, New Jersey, U.S.
- Education: Pontifical University of St. Thomas Aquinas; Pontifical Lateran University
- Motto: Have the mind of Jesus
- Coat of arms

Styles of Joseph Anthony Galante
- Reference style: His Excellency; The Most Reverend
- Spoken style: Your Excellency
- Religious style: Bishop

Joseph Anthony Galante (July 2, 1938 – May 25, 2019) was an American prelate of the Catholic Church who served as bishop of the Latin Church diocese of Camden in New Jersey from 2004 to 2013.

He previously held several positions as a bishop in Texas from 1992 to 2004, after serving in the Roman Curia as undersecretary of the Congregation for Religious from 1986 to 1992.

== Biography ==
=== Early life ===
Joseph Galante was born on July 2, 1938, in Philadelphia, Pennsylvania. He attended Saint Joseph's Preparatory School in Philadelphia and St. Charles Borromeo Seminary in Wynnewood, Pennsylvania, where he received his Bachelor of Arts degree in 1960.

Galante was ordained to the priesthood for the Archdiocese of Philadelphia on May 16, 1964. At the Pontifical Lateran University in Rome, he earned his Doctor of Canon Law degree and at the Pontifical University of St. Thomas Aquinas, he received a Master of Spiritual Theology degree. Galante was named undersecretary of the Congregation for Religious in December 1986.

=== Bishop in Texas ===
Galante held three positions in Texas as bishop:

- Auxiliary bishop of the Archdiocese of San Antonio. Appointed by Pope John Paul II on October 13, 1992, Galante was consecrated as bishop by Archbishop Patrick Flores on December 11, 1992.
- Bishop of the Diocese of Beaumont. Appointed by John Paul II on April 5, 1994, he was installed on May 9, 1994.
- Coadjutor bishop of the Diocese of Dallas. Appointed by John Paul II on November 23, 1999, he was soon appointed bishop of Camden on March 23, 2004, while Bishop Charles Grahmann was still leading the Diocese of Dallas.

=== Bishop of Camden ===
Galante was appointed bishop of Camden by John Paul II on March 23, 2004 and installed on April 30, 2004.

On April 2, 2008, Galante announced large-scale mergers and closings of half of the parishes in the Diocese of Camden. He was implicated three months later in a scandal by a New York Post article titled A Deal with the Devil, which revealed that Raffaello Follieri had bought Galante's beach house for $400,000 in 2007. This happened shortly after Galante began the study that resulted in this 2008 announcement of the parish mergers and closings. In September 2008, Follieri pleaded guilty to conspiracy, wire fraud, and money laundering charges which arose from his defrauding investors through false and misleading statements, and received a 4 1/2-year prison sentence. The beach house was sold in 2010 for $310,000. Galante and Burkle were never charged with any crimes in relation to the scandal.

In January 2011, parishioners of the closed St Mary's Parish in Malaga, New Jersey, re-entered the church and began an around-the-clock vigil that attracted regional and national media attention. In a 2011 letter to Catholics in his diocese, Galante announced that he was suffering from chronic kidney disease caused by diabetes, but indicated that he could continue to serve as bishop of Camden.

=== Retirement and legacy ===
In 2012, Galante asked the pope to be allowed to resign for health reasons; he served until his resignation was accepted by Pope Benedict XVI on January 8, 2013. Galante died on May 25, 2019, at Shore Medical Center in Somers Point, New Jersey, from a long illness.

Catholic Church titles
Preceded by Nicholas Anthony DiMarzio	Bishop of Camden; 2004–2013	Succeeded by Dennis J. Sullivan
Preceded by –	Coadjutor Bishop of Dallas; 1999–2004	Succeeded by –
Preceded by Bernard J. Ganter	Bishop of Beaumont; 1994–1999	Succeeded by Curtis J. Guillory
