= David Konderla =

American Catholic prelate (born 1960)

His Excellency, The Most Reverend David Konderla
- Bishop of Tulsa
- Province: Oklahoma City
- Diocese: Tulsa
- Appointed: May 13, 2016
- Installed: June 29, 2016
- Predecessor: Edward James Slattery

Orders
- Ordination: June 3, 1991 by John E. McCarthy
- Consecration: June 29, 2016 by Paul Stagg Coakley, Edward James Slattery, Joe S. Vásquez

Personal details
- Born: June 3, 1960 (age 66) Bryan, Texas, US
- Education: St. Mary's Seminary; University of St. Thomas
- Motto: Nisi Dominus aedificaverit (Latin for 'Unless the Lord had built')
- Styles
- Reference style: His Excellency; The Most Reverend
- Spoken style: Your Excellency
- Religious style: Bishop

David Austin Konderla (born June 3, 1960) is an American Catholic prelate serving as Bishop of Tulsa since 2016.

== Biography ==
=== Early life ===
David Austin Konderla was born on June 3, 1960, in Bryan, Texas, the second of twelve children of David and Ann Konderla. He graduated from Bryan High School in 1978 and then worked as a machinist for several years.

Konderla entered Holy Trinity Seminary at the University of Dallas in Irving, Texas, in 1985. He continued his education at St. Mary's Seminary at the University of St. Thomas in Houston, receiving a Master of Divinity degree in 1989.

=== Priesthood ===
Konderla was ordained a priest at San Jose Church in Austin, Texas, on June 3, 1995, for the Diocese of Austin by Bishop John McCarthy. After his ordination, the diocese assigned Konderla as parochial vicar at the following parishes in Texas:

- St. Louis in Austin (1995 to 1997)
- St. Luke's in Temple (1997)
- St. Mary's Catholic Center at Texas A&M University in College Station (1997 to 2001).

Konderla left the Catholic Center in 2001 after being appointed vocations director for the diocese. Four years later, he returned to Texas A&M to serve as pastor and director of campus ministry. He would remain in these positions for the next 11 years. Konderla also served the college of consultors, the presbyteral council, and the priest personnel board for the diocese.

== Episcopate ==
=== Bishop of Tulsa ===
Pope Francis appointed Konderla as bishop of Tulsa on May 13, 2016. His consecration by Archbishop Paul Stagg Coakley occurred on June 29, 2016, at the Donald W. Reynolds Center at the University of Tulsa, with Bishops Edward Slattery and Joe S. Vásquez serving as co-consecrators.

=== Pastoral letters and public statements ===
As Bishop of Tulsa, Konderla has issued pastoral letters and public statements addressing Catholic teaching, diocesan life, and social issues, often aligning with national Catholic priorities while addressing local concerns. These writings and statements, reflect Konderla's focus on orthodox teaching, social justice, and civic engagement.

In 2018, Konderla promulgated Sent to Proclaim Good News, a pastoral letter emphasizing evangelization and the New Evangelization in the Diocese of Tulsa, drawing on Pope Francis's Evangelii Gaudium. The letter called for renewed missionary zeal in response to declining sacramental participation, outlining initiatives such as formation programs for lay leaders and parish revitalization efforts.

In October 2019, Konderla released a list of nine priests and two deacons from the diocese with credible accusations of sexual abuse of children.

During the COVID-19 pandemic in March 2020, Konderla suspended public Masses, emphasizing spiritual communion and charity toward vulnerable populations. In May 2020, he commended vaccine development but raised ethical concerns about fetal cell lines in research, urging support for alternatives. In June 2020, following the murder of George Floyd, Konderla issued a statement expressing solidarity with Black Catholics, condemning systemic racism, and calling for prayer, education, and action to address inequalities, referencing the U.S. bishops’ 2018 pastoral letter Open Wide Our Hearts. He hosted diocesan listening sessions on racial justice.

In the lead-up to the 2020 U.S. presidential election, Konderla echoed the USCCB's Forming Consciences for Faithful Citizenship, highlighting abortion as a priority issue while urging consideration of immigration, poverty, and family policies. In October 2020, Konderla withdrew the diocese from the Oklahoma Conference of Churches. The conference director, Reverend Shannon Fleck, stated that Konderla objected to the inclusion of LGBTQ individuals in a statement against discrimination; Konderla clarified in November 2020 that his reason was the conference's failure to address discrimination against "unborn children".

In 2021, Konderla released This Is My Body: A Pastoral Letter on the Eucharist, amid U.S. bishops’ discussions on Eucharistic coherence. The letter explored the theology of the Real Presence, addressed misunderstandings, and promoted reverence in liturgical practices, launching annual diocesan Eucharistic revival events, including processions and congresses, starting in 2022. Also in 2021, Konderla testified before the Oklahoma Legislature in support of school choice and voucher programs for Catholic schools.

In February 2022, Konderla joined a vigil outside the Oklahoma State Penitentiary in McAlester, Oklahoma, to protest the upcoming execution of Gilbert Postelle, who had been convicted of four murders in 2005. Postelle was executed by lethal injection on February 17, 2022. In 2022, Konderla supported the USCCB's response to the Synod on Synodality, affirming traditional teachings on marriage while welcoming dialogue.

In 2023, Konderla issued a pastoral note cautioning against gender-affirming care for minors, citing Church teachings on human dignity, and criticized federal Title IX revisions, arguing they undermined religious liberty in schools.

In 2024, Konderla issued Stewards of Creation: A Call to Ecological Conversion, inspired by Pope Francis's Laudato Si'. The letter connected Catholic social teaching to local issues like Oklahoma's water scarcity and energy production, encouraging parishes to adopt sustainable practices and advocate for environmental policies. Ahead of the 2024 midterm elections, he reiterated his 2020 election guidance, advocating protections for the unborn and migrants.

=== Personal life and hobbies ===
Konderla's hobbies include carpentry and woodworking. He made his own crosier prior to his 2016 episcopal consecration, having made crosiers for four other bishops previously.

== See also ==
- Catholic Church hierarchy
- Catholic Church in the United States
- Historical list of the Catholic bishops of the United States
- List of Catholic bishops of the United States
- Lists of patriarchs, archbishops, and bishops

== Episcopal succession ==
Catholic Church titles
Preceded by Edward James Slattery	Bishop of Tulsa; 2016–present	Succeeded by Incumbent
