= Monsignor Kelly Catholic High School =

Location
- 5950 Kelly Drive; Beaumont, (Jefferson County), Texas 77707; United States; 30°3′42″N 94°9′39″W

Information
- Type: Private, coeducational
- Religious affiliation: Roman Catholic
- Established: 1895
- Local authority: Diocese of Beaumont
- Oversight: Texas Conference of Catholic Bishops Education
- President: Gina Harris
- Principal: Gina Harris
- Chaplain: Father Houng
- Teaching staff: 22
- Grades: 9–12
- Gender: Co-ed
- Enrollment: 303 (2025-2026) (2016)
  - Grade 12: 57 (2025)
- Average class size: 16
- Student to teacher ratio: 1:11
- Classes offered: Dual Credit, AP Advanced Placement
- Hours in school day: 8
- Campus: Urban
- Colors: Blue and gold
- Athletics conference: TAPPS
- Sports: football, baseball, basketball, soccer, softball, tennis, swimming, track and field
- Mascot: Vic, and Tory
- Team name: Bulldogs
- Publication: Zephyr (literary magazine)
- Newspaper: The Bulldog News
- Yearbook: The Medallion
- Feeder schools: Saint Catherine of Siena Catholic School, Saint Anne Catholic School, and Saint Anthony Catholic School
- Website: www.mkchs.com

Monsignor Kelly Catholic High School is a private, parochial High School located in Beaumont, Texas. It is a member of the Roman Catholic Diocese of Beaumont. A majority of students at Kelly come from various grade schools within the Diocese of Beaumont and one Episcopalian elementary and middle school. Other students come from public schools throughout Southeast Texas.

== Notable alumni ==
- Vamsi Mootha, physician-scientist and computational biologist
