= Edward James Slattery =

American prelate of the Catholic Church (1940–2024)

His Excellency, The Most Reverend Edward James Slattery
- Bishop of Tulsa
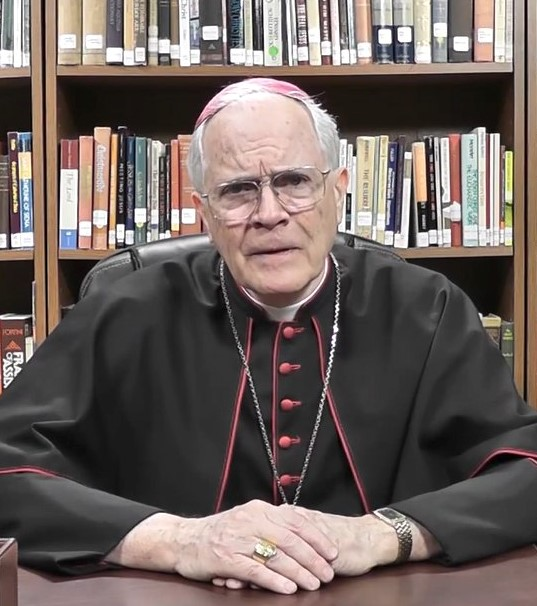
- Slattery in 2013
- Diocese: Diocese of Tulsa
- Appointed: November 11, 1993
- Installed: January 6, 1994
- Retired: May 13, 2016
- Predecessor: Eusebius J. Beltran
- Successor: David Konderla

Orders
- Ordination: April 26, 1966 by John Patrick Cody
- Consecration: January 6, 1994 by John Paul II

Personal details
- Born: August 11, 1940 Chicago, Illinois, U.S.
- Died: September 13, 2024 (aged 84) Bixby, Oklahoma, U.S.
- Buried: Calvary Cemetery, Tulsa, Oklahoma
- Denomination: Roman Catholic
- Parents: William Edward Slattery and Winifred Margaret Brennan
- Education: St. Mary of the Lake Seminary; Loyola University Chicago
- Motto: Tu solus sanctus (You alone are the Holy One)

Styles of Edward James Slattery
- Reference style: His Excellency; The Most Reverend
- Spoken style: Your Excellency
- Religious style: Bishop

Edward James Slattery (August 11, 1940 – September 13, 2024) was an American prelate of the Roman Catholic Church who served as bishop of the Diocese of Tulsa in Oklahoma from 1993 to 2016.

== Biography ==
=== Early life ===
The second of seven children, Edward Slattery was born on August 11, 1940, in Chicago, Illinois, to William Edward and Winifred Margaret (née Brennan) Slattery; both his paternal and maternal grandparents emigrated to the United States from Ireland.

After attending Visitation of the Blessed Virgin Mary Grade School and Archbishop Quigley Preparatory Seminary in Chicago, Slattery studied at St. Mary of the Lake Seminary in Mundelein, Illinois, obtaining Bachelor of Arts and Master of Divinity degrees.

=== Priesthood ===
Slattery was ordained to the priesthood for the Archdiocese of Chicago at St. Mary of the Lake by John Cody on April 26, 1966. After his ordination, the archdiocese assigned Slattery as an associate pastor of St. Jude the Apostle Parish in South Holland, Illinois. During this time, he also earned a Master's degree from Loyola University Chicago. Slattery was appointed as vice-president of the Catholic Church Extension Society in 1971. While working at Extension, he was named associate pastor of St. Rose of Lima Parish in Chicago in 1973. Slattery became the Extension president in 1976 and was transferred to St. Rose of Lima Parish in Chicago from 1976 to 1989.

=== Bishop of Tulsa ===
On November 11, 1993, Pope John Paul II appointed Slattery as the third bishop of Tulsa. He was consecrated by John Paul II in Rome on January 6, 1994, with Archbishops Giovanni Re and Josip Uhac serving as co-consecrators, in St. Peter's Basilica in Rome. Slattery selected as his episcopal motto: "Tu Solus Sanctus", meaning, "You alone are the Holy One."

=== Retirement and death ===
Pope Francis accepted Slattery's letter of resignation as bishop of Tulsa on May 13, 2016, appointing Father David Konderla to succeed him. Slattery died in Bixby, Oklahoma, on September 13, 2024, at the age of 84.

== Views ==
=== Abortion ===
During the 2008 U.S. presidential election, Slattery criticized the House Speaker Nancy Pelosi and then U.S. Senator Joe Biden, both Catholics, for their remarks on abortion rights for women on the TV program Meet the Press. Slattery described their positions as "clearly inconsistent with Catholic teaching" and "plainly false."

=== Liturgy ===
Slattery was a conservative on question of liturgical practice. He returned to the practice of celebrating the Eucharistic liturgy in his cathedral using the ancient style in which the priest and the congregation face the same direction, ad orientem. He believed this form had a number of advantages over the form of in which the priest faces the congregation.

On April 24, 2010, Slattery celebrated high mass at the Basilica of the National Shrine of the Immaculate Conception in Washington, D.C., to mark the fifth anniversary of Pope Benedict XVI's papacy, wearing the rarely seen cappa magna.

=== Statement on contraceptive mandates ===
On February 2, 2012, Slattery released a statement in response to the contraceptive mandates issued by the United States Department of Health and Human Services under the 2010 Patient Protection and Affordable Care Act. Slattery joined other bishops in the United States Conference of Catholic Bishops in opposing the mandate.

=== Undocumented immigrants ===
In 2006, Slattery said that if a law was passed criminalizing the act of aiding undocumented immigrants, "then [he] will become a criminal," adding,

When it becomes a crime to love the poor and serve their needs, then I will be the first to go to jail for this crime, and I pray that every priest and every deacon in this diocese will have the courage to walk with me into that prison.

In 2007, Slattery issued a 21-page pastoral letter in which he condemned Oklahoma House Bill 1804, a strict anti-illegal immigration law which Slattery claimed creates "an atmosphere of repression and terror."

Catholic Church titles
Preceded by Eusebius J. Beltran	Bishop of Tulsa; 1993–2016	Succeeded by David Konderla
