= Presbyteral council =

A presbyteral council or council of priests is a group of priests chosen to assist the local ordinary in an advisory capacity in the governance of a Roman Catholic diocese. Canon 495 of the Code of Canon Law lays down that every diocese must have such a council. The council addresses matters concerning the pastoral welfare of the people of God in the local church.

About half of the members of the council are freely elected by the priests. The others have membership either because of a position that they hold (ex officio) or because nominated by the bishop.

It is for the bishop to decide when to consult the council, to preside over the meeting and to determine the agenda, whether the items for inclusion are his own initiative or are proposed by some member of the council.

In the case of a sede vacante the council ceases to exist and its functions are taken over by the college of consultors.
