= Daniel E. Garcia =

American Catholic bishop (born 1960)

His Excellency, The Most Reverend Daniel Elias Garcia
- Bishop of Austin
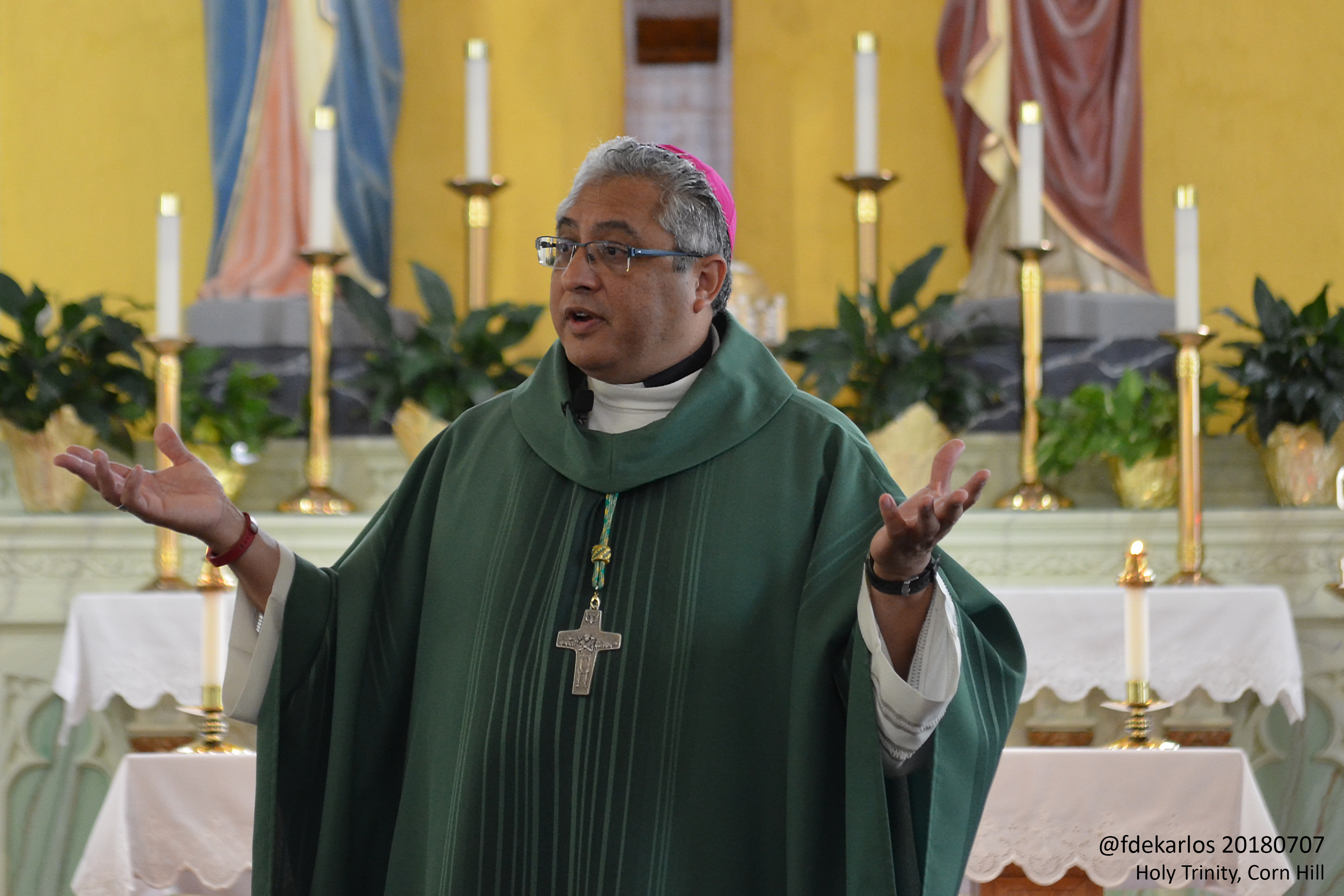
- Bishop Garcia at Holy Trinity Church in Texas in 2018
- See: Austin
- Appointed: July 2, 2025
- Installed: September 18, 2025
- Predecessor: Joe S. Vásquez
- Previous posts: Bishop of Monterey (2019-2025); Auxiliary Bishop of Austin (2015-2019)

Orders
- Ordination: May 28, 1988 by John E. McCarthy
- Consecration: March 3, 2015 by Joe S. Vásquez, Gregory Michael Aymond, Michael Sis

Personal details
- Born: August 30, 1960 (age 66) Cameron, Texas, US
- Denomination: Roman Catholic
- Education: Tyler Junior College; College of Saint Benedict and Saint John's University; University of St. Thomas
- Motto: Walk humbly with God
- Coat of arms: Daniel Elias Garcia's coat of arms

Styles of Daniel Elias Garcia
- Reference style: His Excellency; The Most Reverend
- Spoken style: Your Excellency
- Religious style: Bishop

Ordination history of Daniel E. Garcia
History
Priestly ordination
- Ordained by: John E. McCarthy
Episcopal consecration
- Principal consecrator: Joe S. Vásquez
- Co-consecrators: Gregory Michael Aymond; Michael Sis

Daniel Elias Garcia (born August 30, 1960) is an American Catholic prelate who has served as Bishop of Austin since 2025. He was an auxiliary bishop for the diocese from 2015 to 2019 and Bishop of Monterey in California from 2019 to 2025.

== Biography ==
=== Early life and education ===
Daniel Garcia was born on August 30, 1960, in Cameron, Texas, the first child of Daniel and Sarah Garcia. He graduated from C.H. Yoe High School in Cameron in 1978 and earned an associate degree from Tyler Junior College in Tyler, Texas, in 1982.

Garcia entered Saint Mary's Seminary at the University of St. Thomas in Houston, Texas. He received a Bachelor of Arts degree from St. Thomas in 1984 and a Master of Divinity degree in 1988.

=== Ordination and ministry ===
Garcia was ordained to the priesthood for the Diocese of Austin at St. Monica Church in Cameron by Bishop John E. McCarthy on May 28, 1988.

After his ordination, Garcia fulfilled assignments as associate pastor first at three Austin parishes, St. Catherine of Siena (1988 to 1990), Cristo Rey (1990 to 1991), and St. Louis (1991 to 1992), then at St. Mary Magdalene in Humble (1992 to 1995), and then again in Austin at St. Vincent de Paul (1995 to 2014).

Garcia was sent to the Archdiocese of Galveston-Houston in 1992 to serve as associate pastor at St. Mary Magdalene Parish in Houston. He returned to Austin in 1995 and served as pastor of St. Vincent de Paul Parish in Austin for 18 years. In 2007, Garcia was awarded a Master of Arts in Liturgical Studies from Saint John's School of Theology in Collegeville, Minnesota.

On the diocesan level Garcia was a member of the priests personnel board and the college of consultors. He was chair of the presbyteral council and dean of the Austin North Deanery. On March 3, 2014, Bishop Joe S. Vásquez appointed Garcia moderator of the curia.

=== Auxiliary Bishop of Austin ===
Coat of arms as auxiliary bishop of Austin

On January 21, 2015, Pope Francis appointed Garcia an auxiliary bishop of Austin and titular bishop of Capsus. He received his episcopal consecration at St. Williams Church in Round Rock, Texas, on March 3, 2015, from Vásquez, with Archbishop Gregory Aymond and Bishop Michael Sis serving as co-consecrators. He was Austin's first auxiliary.

=== Bishop of Monterey ===
Coat of Arms as Bishop of Monterey

On November 27, 2018, Francis appointed Garcia bishop of Monterey. He was installed on January 29, 2019.

=== Bishop of Austin ===
On July 2, 2025, Pope Leo XIV named Garcia bishop of Austin. He was installed on September 18, 2025.

Catholic Church titles
Preceded by -	Auxiliary Bishop of Austin; 2015–2019	Succeeded by -
Preceded by Bernard Popp	— TITULAR — Titular bishop of Capsus; 2015–2019	Succeeded by William Muhm
Preceded by Richard John Garcia	Bishop of Monterey; 2019–2025	Succeeded by Ramon Bejarano (bishop elect)
Preceded by Joe S. Vásquez	Bishop of Austin; 2025–present	Incumbent
