= St. Dominic Savio Catholic High School =

Location
- 9300 Neenah Avenue; Austin, Williamson County, Texas 78717; United States; 30°29′19″N 97°45′37″W

Information
- School type: Private, Coeducational Catholic
- Religious affiliation: Roman Catholic
- Patron saint: Dominic Savio
- Established: 2009
- President: Timothy Cullen
- Grades: 9–12
- Enrollment: 412 (September 2019)
- Classes offered: Academic, Pre-AP, and AP
- Hours in school day: 8
- Colors: Navy and gold
- Athletics conference: TAPPS
- Mascot: Eagle
- Team name: Eagles
- Rival: St. Michael’s Catholic Academy
- Tuition: $12,100/$13,200
- Website: www.saviochs.org

St. Dominic Savio Catholic High School is a Roman Catholic high school located in northern Austin, Texas, United States. The school, a part of the Roman Catholic Diocese of Austin, opened in August 2009. It is administered by the diocese.

== History ==
After the closure of Austin's only diocesan Catholic high school in 1972, a private Catholic high school, Saint Michael's Catholic Academy, was built in 1984. In 2002 a second Catholic High School, San Juan Diego Catholic High School, was established by the diocese to serve low income students in Austin. With both located in southern Austin, and no Catholic high school to serve the fast-growing northern part of the metropolitan area, pressure had grown to start a new high school. Groundbreaking was April 20, 2008 with construction to occur in three phases. The first phase has capacity for 350 students, but when fully built out St. Dominic Savio High School will be one of the largest private schools in the area. The high school is named after Saint Dominic Savio, the youngest non-martyr ever canonized.

== Background ==
St. Dominic Savio Catholic High School, which is named for the Catholic saint, opened to incoming 9th and 10th graders on August 31, 2009. The 45-acre (180,000 m^{2}) campus is located in north Austin and is the first Catholic high school, and one of the few private high schools, in rapidly growing Williamson County.

== Curriculum ==
St. Dominic Savio Catholic High School is a college preparatory diocesan high school. Over 40 PreAP, AP, and dual-enrollment courses are offered.

== Athletics ==
St. Dominic Savio competes in the Texas Association of Private and Parochial Schools, fielding varsity teams in the following sports:

- Baseball
- Basketball
- Cheerleading
- Cross Country
- Football
- Golf
- Soccer
- Softball
- Swimming
- Tennis
- Track
- Volleyball

== Academics and fine arts ==
Saint Dominic Savio has an active fine arts program which includes annual performances of plays and musicals. It also competes in the Texas Association of Private and Parochial Schools in Music and Art. In 2011, 2012, and 2013 Dominic Savio won the TAPPS 3A State Music championship. All of their large instrumental ensembles and four of their five choirs qualified for the state competition:

- Savio Symphony Orchestra
- Savio Concert Band
- Savio Strings
- Savio Jazz Ensemble
- Savio Faith Choir
- Savio Show Choir

Saint Dominic Savio was TAPPS 5A overall Academic and Speech champions in 2017, 2018 and 2023.
