= Joseph Fiorenza =

American Catholic prelate (1931–2022)

His Excellency, The Most Reverend Joseph Anthony Fiorenza
- Archbishop of Galveston-Houston
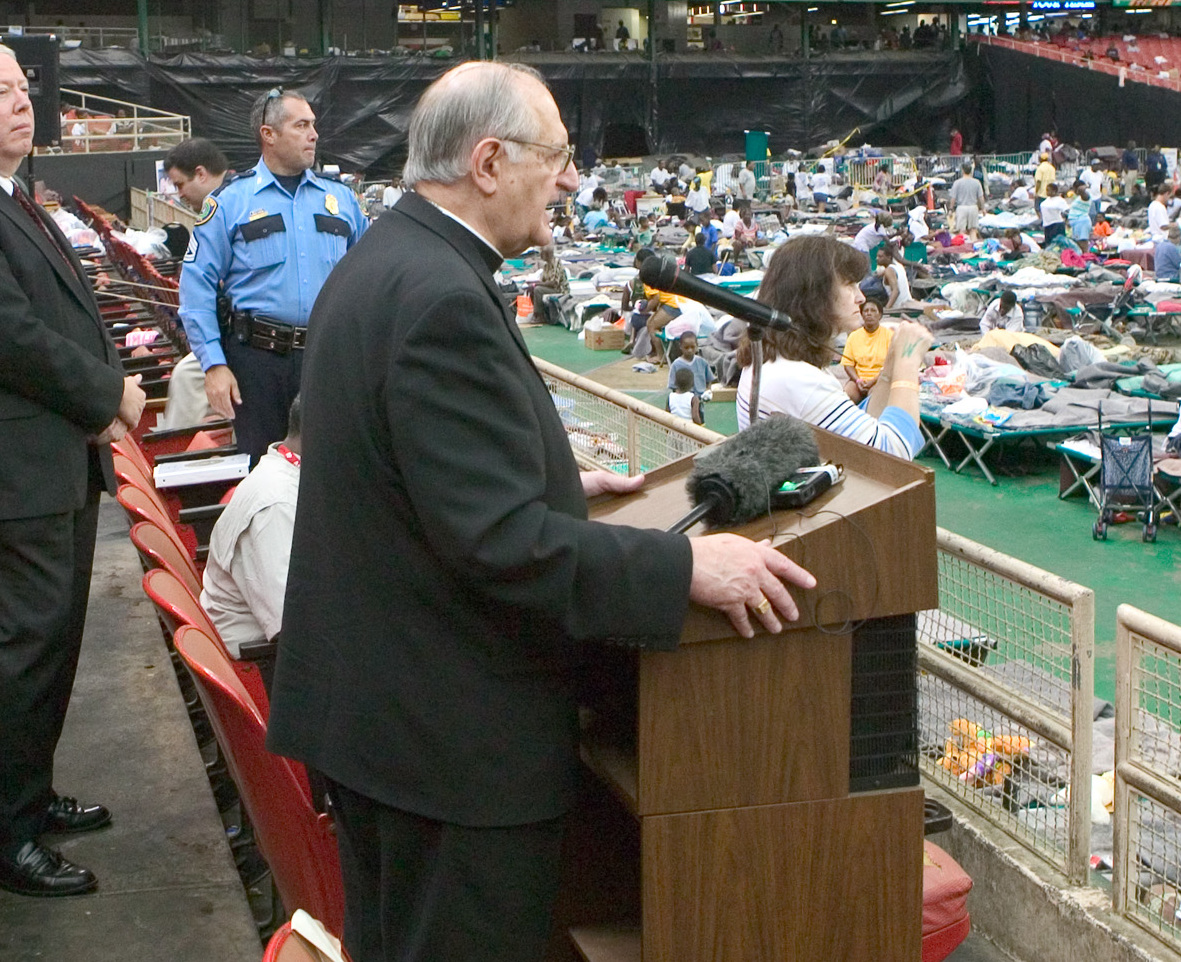
- Fiorenza addressing Hurricane Katrina evacuees in 2005
- Archdiocese: Galveston-Houston
- Appointed: December 6, 1984
- Installed: February 18, 1985
- Term ended: February 26, 2006
- Predecessor: John Louis Morkovsky
- Successor: Daniel DiNardo
- Previous post: Bishop of San Angelo (1979–1984)

Orders
- Ordination: May 29, 1954 by Wendelin Joseph Nold
- Consecration: October 25, 1979 by Patrick Flores, John Louis Morkovsky, and John E. McCarthy

Personal details
- Born: January 25, 1931 Beaumont, Texas, U.S.
- Died: September 19, 2022 (aged 91)
- Education: St. Mary's Seminary
- Motto: Thy kingdom come

Styles of Joseph Anthony Fiorenza
- Reference style: His Excellency; The Most Reverend
- Spoken style: Your Excellency
- Religious style: Archbishop

Joseph Anthony Fiorenza (January 25, 1931 – September 19, 2022) was an American prelate of the Catholic Church. He was the seventh bishop and the first archbishop of the Archdiocese of Galveston-Houston in Texas, serving from 1985 to 2006. He previously served as bishop of the Diocese of San Angelo in Texas from 1979 to 1984.

== Biography ==
=== Early life and education ===
Joseph Fiorenza was born in Beaumont, Texas, the second of four sons of Anthony and Grace (née Galiano) Fiorenza. His father immigrated from Sicily at age 10, while his mother was the daughter of Sicilian immigrants. He attended St. Anthony High School in Beaumont, where he was football team captain and senior class president. Fiorenza skipped a grade and graduated from high school at age 16 in 1947. He then studied at St. Mary's Seminary in La Porte, Texas.

=== Priesthood ===
Fiorenza was ordained to the priesthood on May 29, 1954. His first assignment was as assistant pastor of Queen of Peace Parish in Houston, where he remained for three years. In 1957, he became professor of medical ethics at Sacred Heart Dominican College and chaplain of St. Joseph Hospital, both in Houston. He served as administrator of Sacred Heart Co-Cathedral in Houston from 1959 to 1967. In 1965, Fiorenza participated in the Selma to Montgomery marches in Alabama during the Civil Rights Movement.

Fiorenza served as pastor of St. Augustine Parish (1967 to 1969) and of St. Benedict the Abbot Parish (1969 to 1972), both in Houston. From 1972 to 1973, he was both pastor of Assumption Parish in Houston and vice-chancellor of the diocese. Fiorenza was named honorary prelate of his holiness by Pope Paul VI on December 5, 1973, and served as diocesan chancellor from 1973 to 1979.

=== Bishop of San Angelo ===
On September 4, 1979, Fiorenza was appointed the fourth bishop of the Diocese of San Angelo by Pope John Paul II. He received his episcopal consecration on October 25, 1979, from Archbishop Patrick Flores, with Bishops John Morkovsky and John E. McCarthy serving as co-consecrators, at Sacred Heart Cathedral in San Angelo.

=== Bishop and archbishop of Galveston-Houston ===
On December 18, 1984, Fiorenza was named bishop of the Diocese of Galveston-Houston by Pope John Paul II. He was installed by Archbishop Patrick Flores in the presence of Archbishop Pio Laghi, the apostolic pro-nuncio. The Diocese of Galveston-Houston was elevated to the level of archdiocese by John Paul II on Dec. 29, 2004, at which point Fiorenza became an archbishop.

On June 11, 2001, Fiorenza expressed his regret at the execution of Timothy McVeigh, a domestic terrorist convicted of killing 168 people in the Oklahoma City bombing in 1995. Fiorenza said:

In an age where respect for life is threatened in so many ways, we believe it is important to emphasize that human life is a gift from God, and no one or any government should presume to kill God's gift.

When a wave of allegations of sexual abuse of boys and girls within the Catholic Church was widely reported from 2002, Fiorenza issued a statement proclaiming that the archdiocese would "make the protection and safety of children and young people a top priority", but it has been reported that nothing was done; internal memos from 1996—published in detail by the press—show that abuse was reported but ignored for years. In a 2006 news report Fiorenza was said to have had a tendency to accept troubled clergy into his domains; and the Galveston-Houston archdiocese acted to protect the church from public scrutiny, mounting vigorous legal defenses, blaming the victims, and obfuscating for the news media.

=== Retirement ===
Fiorenza submitted his letter of retirement as archbishop of the Archdiocese of Galveston-Houston to Pope Benedict XVI in February 2006 at the mandatory retirement age of 75. The pope accepted his resignation on February 28, 2006, and appointed former coadjutor archbishop Daniel DiNardo as Fiorenza's successor. Fiorenza had been living in retirement at the Archbishop Joseph A. Fiorenza Priest Retirement Residence in Houston. The Archbishop Joseph Fiorenza Park in Harris County, Texas, is named after Fiorenza.

In a February 2020 lawsuit filed against the archdiocese, a man and a woman from Conroe, Texas accused Fiorenza of allowing the ordination of Manuel La Rosa-Lopez, despite a previous allegation of sexual abuse. In 1992, the Diocese of Galveston-Houston received an accusation that La Rosa-Lopez had molested a minor at St. Thomas More Parish in Houston. Despite this, Fiorenza allowed La Rosa-Lopez to be ordained a priest in 1999. Between 1998 and 2001, he allegedly molested the two plaintiffs at Sacred Heart Parish in Conroe, both of whom were children. Fiorenza met with the girl's family at the time of the initial accusation and promised to remove La Rosa-Lopez from the parish and send him for treatment. However, the allegations were never reported to police or to parishioners. In December 2020, LaRosa-Lopez pleaded guilty to felony indecency with a child and was sentenced to 10 years in prison.

== Appointments and board memberships ==
- Member of the administrative board of the National Conference of Catholic Bishops, 1995– ?
- Former member of the Bishops' Committee for Black Catholics
- Vice-president of the National Conference of Catholic Bishops – 1995–1998
- Board member of the Catholic Near East Welfare Association
- Trustee of the University of St. Thomas in Houston
- President of the board of trustees of Catholic Charities
- President of the National Conference of Catholic Bishops – 1998–2001

== See also ==
- Catholic Church hierarchy
- Catholic Church in the United States
- Christianity in Houston
- Historical list of the Catholic bishops of the United States
- List of Catholic bishops of the United States
- Lists of patriarchs, archbishops, and bishops

== Episcopal succession ==
Catholic Church titles
Preceded by Archdiocese created	Archbishop of Galveston-Houston; 2004–2006	Succeeded by Daniel DiNardo
Preceded by John Louis Morkovsky	Bishop of Galveston-Houston; 1984–2004	Succeeded by Diocese elevated
Preceded by Anthony Pilla	President of the United States Conference of Catholic Bishops; 1998–2001	Succeeded by Wilton Daniel Gregory
Preceded by Stephen Aloysius Leven	Bishop of San Angelo; 1979–1984	Succeeded by Michael David Pfeifer
