= Joe S. Vásquez =

American Catholic prelate (born 1957)

His Excellency, The Most Reverend Joe S. Vásquez
- Archbishop of Galveston-Houston
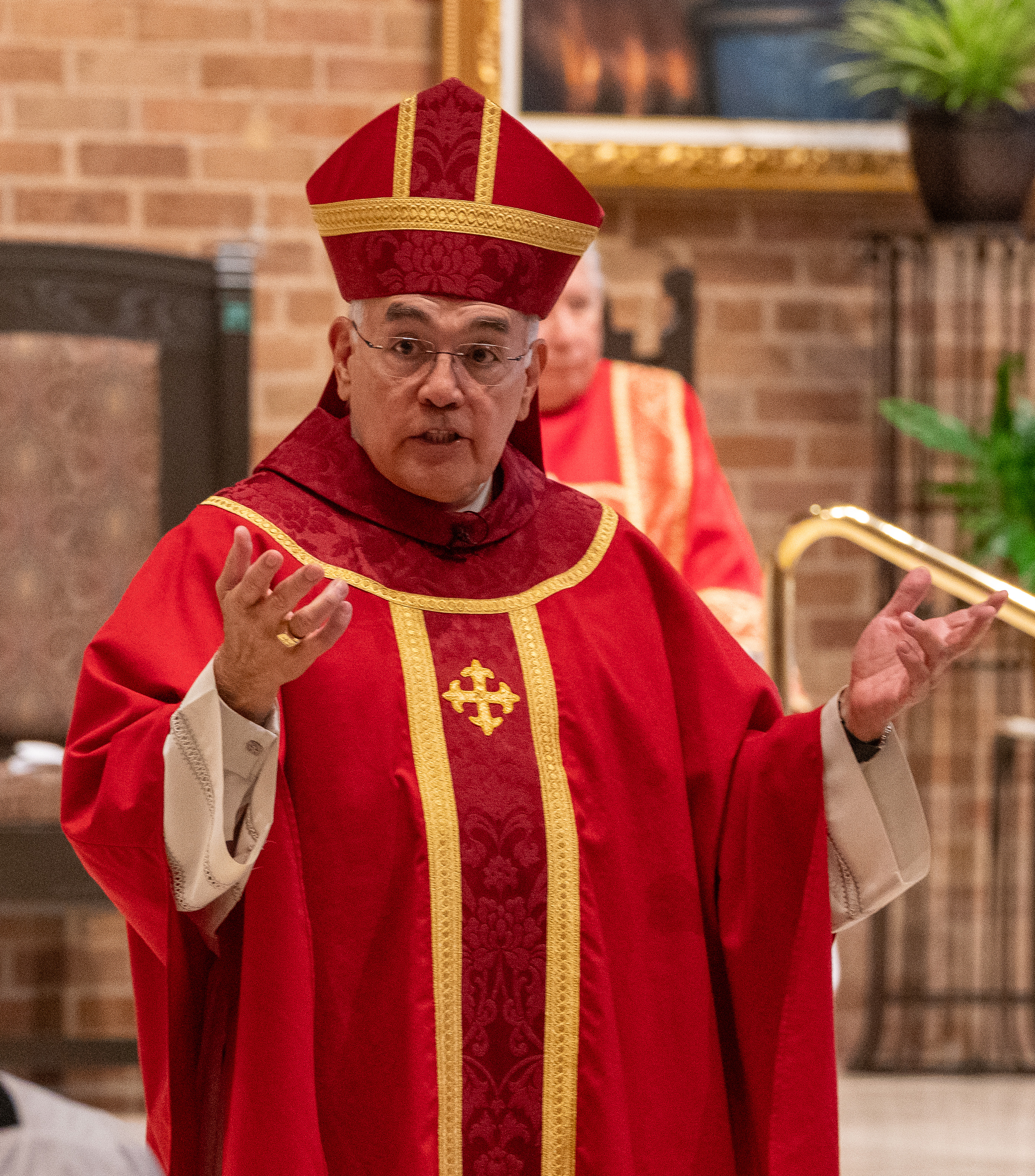
- Vásquez in 2024
- See: Galveston-Houston
- Appointed: January 20, 2025
- Installed: March 25, 2025
- Predecessor: Daniel DiNardo
- Previous posts: Apostolic Administrator of Tyler (2023–2024); Bishop of Austin (2010–2025); Auxiliary Bishop of Galveston-Houston & Titular Bishop of Cova (2002–2010)

Orders
- Ordination: June 30, 1984 by Joseph Fiorenza
- Consecration: January 23, 2002 by Joseph Fiorenza, Patrick Flores, and Michael David Pfeifer

Personal details
- Born: July 9, 1957 (age 69) Stamford, Texas, US
- Education: University of St. Thomas; Pontifical Gregorian University
- Motto: Sígueme (Spanish for 'Follow Me')
- Styles
- Reference style: His Excellency; The Most Reverend
- Spoken style: Your Excellency
- Religious style: Archbishop

Joe Steve Vásquez (born July 9, 1957) is an American Catholic prelate serving as Archbishop of Galveston–Houston since 2025. He previously served as Bishop of Austin from 2010 to 2025 and as apostolic administrator of the Diocese of Tyler from 2023 to 2024. He was an auxiliary bishop of Galveston-Houston from 2001 to 2010.

== Biography ==
Joe Steve Vásquez was born on July 9, 1957, in Stamford, Texas, to Juan (b. 1933) and Elvira Vásquez (d. 2005). He is a third generation Mexican American. His grandparents were migrant workers from Guanajuato in central Mexico. His father dropped out of school in the second grade to support his family and later served in the US military during the Korean War. He later made a living as a mechanic, while his mother worked as a seamstress. The oldest of six children, Vásquez has three brothers, Robert, Samuel, and James; and two sisters, Cynthia and Consuelo.

Vásquez attended public schools in Stamford and Abilene. As a teenager, he was active in his parish youth group, participating in summer mission trips to Cuernavaca where he became acquainted with the religious life of poor communities. From 1976 to 1980, he studied at St. Mary Seminary and the University of St. Thomas, both in Houston, obtaining his Bachelor of Theology degree. As a seminarian he spent his summers working alongside his brothers in the cotton fields near Abilene. He furthered his studies at the Pontifical North American College and Pontifical Gregorian University in Rome from 1980 to 1985, earning a licenciate in theology from the Gregorian.

=== Priesthood ===
Vásquez was ordained to the priesthood at the Cathedral of the Sacred Heart in San Angelo by Bishop Joseph Fiorenza for the Diocese of San Angelo on June 30, 1984.

Vásquez' first assessment was parochial vicar at St. Joseph Parish in Odessa, Texas. From 1987 to 1997 he was pastor of St. Joseph Parish in Fort Stockton, Texas. In 1997 he became pastor of St. Joseph Parish in San Angelo, Texas.

During his time in San Angelo, Vásquez also served as the episcopal vicar for Hispanics and was a member of the presbyteral council and the finance board.

=== Auxiliary Bishop of Galveston-Houston ===
On November 30, 2001, Vásquez was appointed auxiliary bishop of Galveston-Houston and titular bishop of Cova by Pope John Paul II. He received his episcopal consecration on January 23, 2002, from Fiorenza, with Archbishop Patrick Flores and Bishop Michael Pfeifer serving as co-consecrators. Vásquez selected as his episcopal motto: "Sígueme."

While auxiliary bishop, Vásquez served as vicar general and chancellor of the archdiocese, as well as episcopal vicar for Hispanics and liaison for youth.

=== Bishop of Austin ===
On January 26, 2010, Vásquez was appointed as bishop of Austin by Pope Benedict XVI, filling the vacancy left by Bishop Gregory Aymond. Vásquez was installed there on March 8, 2010.

In January 2019, as part of a coordinated program on the part of 15 Catholic dioceses in Texas, the Austin diocese released a list of 22 clerics who were credibly accused of sexual abuse of minors. Vásquez said it was compiled by independent investigators whom he did not identify and reviewed by an internal committee with a lay majority, which recommended publication. He expressed his apologies to the victims for what they had suffered. He said: "The victims are the ones who hurt, and we want to make sure they were being heard."

On November 11, 2023, Vásquez was appointed by Pope Francis to also serve as apostolic administrator of the Diocese of Tyler after the pope dismissed Bishop Joseph Strickland. His role ended when Pope Francis appointed Gregory Kelly to succeed Strickland on December 20, 2024.

=== Metropolitan Archbishop of Galveston-Houston ===
On January 20, 2025, Vásquez was appointed by Pope Francis as Archbishop of Galveston-Houston, after the resignation of Daniel DiNardo, made the same day. He was installed on March 25, 2025.

He has been a member of the board of directors of Catholic Relief Services and of the Catholic Legal Immigration Network CLINIC).
