= Diocese of San Angelo =

Latin Catholic ecclesiastical jurisdiction in Texas, USA

Coordinates: 31°27′11″N 100°27′09″W

Diocese of San Angelo Dioecesis Angeliana Diócesis de San Angelo
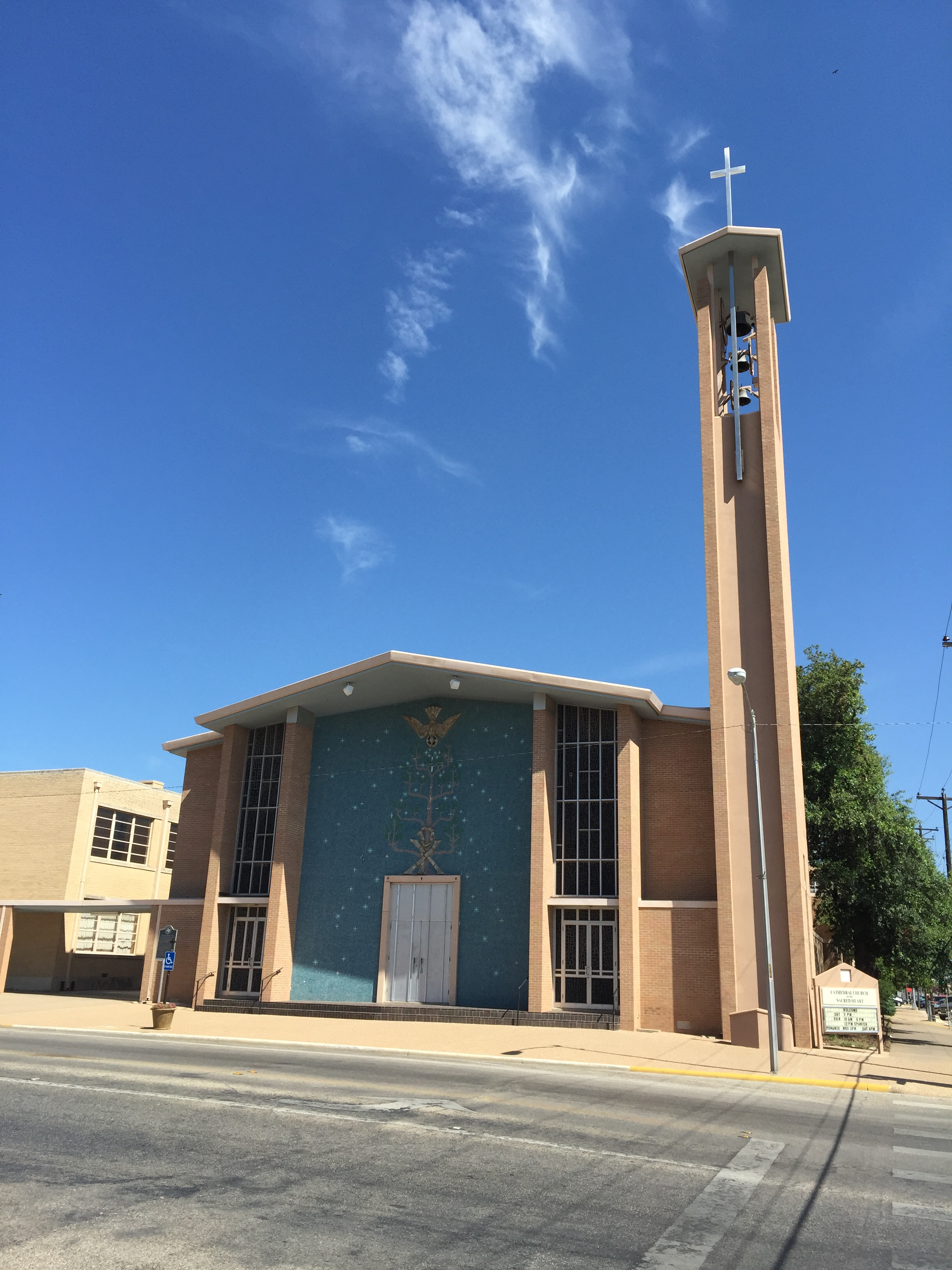
- Cathedral of the Sacred Heart

- Coat of arms

Location
- Country: United States
- Territory: 29 counties (Central and West Texas)
- Ecclesiastical province: Archdiocese of San Antonio, Texas

Statistics
- Population: Total; Catholics: (as of 2022); 810,896; 119,935 (14.8%)

Information
- Denomination: Catholic
- Sui iuris church: Latin Church
- Rite: Roman Rite
- Established: October 16, 1961
- Cathedral: Cathedral of the Sacred Heart
- Patron saint: St. Michael the Archangel

Current leadership
- Pope: Leo XIV
- Bishop: Michael Sis
- Metropolitan Archbishop: Gustavo Garcia-Siller
- Bishops emeritus: Michael David Pfeifer

Map
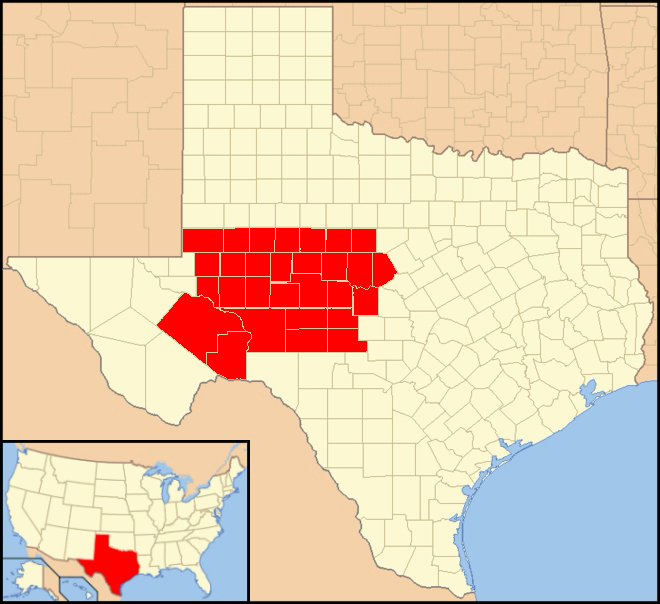

Website
- sanangelodiocese.org

The Diocese of San Angelo (Latin: Dioecesis Angeliana, Spanish: Diócesis de San Angelo) is a diocese of the Catholic Church in Central and West Texas in the United States. It is a suffragan diocese of the Archdiocese of San Antonio. Michael J. Sis is the bishop.

== Description ==
Encompassing some 37,433 square miles (96,950 km^{2}), the Diocese of San Angelo comprises the following 29 counties: Andrews, Brown, Callahan, Coke, Coleman, Concho, Crane, Crockett, Ector, Glasscock, Howard, Irion, Kimble, Martin, McCulloch, Menard, Midland, Mitchell, Nolan, Pecos, Reagan, Runnels, Schleicher, Sterling, Sutton, Taylor, Terrell, Tom Green, and Upton.

== History ==
=== 1600 to 1800 ===
During the 17th century, Texas was a province in the Spanish Empire. The first Catholic presence in the region was the visit of the missionaries Alonso de Benavides and Juan Salas to the Jumanos people in 1629. The two priests celebrated the first mass in the area.

In 1757, the Mission Santa Cruz de San Sabá was established by the missionary Alonso Giraldo de Terreros in present-day Menard County. The purpose of the mission was to evangelize the Lipan Apache people. Although the Apaches never visited the mission, its construction convinced the Comanche people that the Spanish were allying with them. In 1758, the Comanches and their allies attacked the mission, killing de Terreros and burning it down.

=== 1800 to 1900 ===
After passing to Mexican control, Texas became an independent republic in 1836. In 1845, it joined the United States.

After the American Civil War ended in 1865, a new Catholic mission was founded in 1867 at Ben Ficklin, Texas, to serve US Army troops stationed at the new Fort Concho. In Abilene, a Catholic mission was established in the 1880s; it became Sacred Heart Church in 1891. One of the oldest churches in the region is St. Joseph's in Stanton, founded in 1882.

=== 1900 to present ===
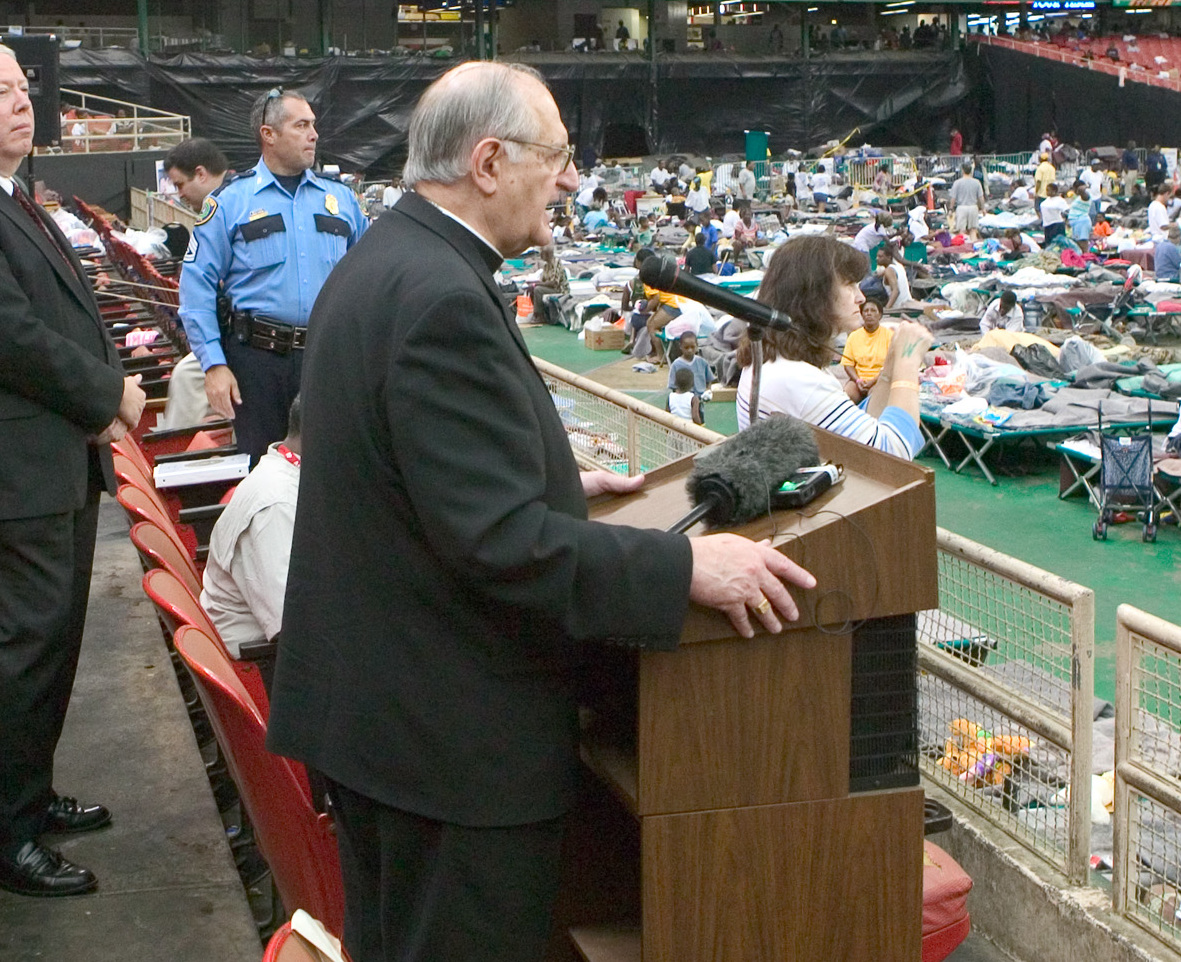
Bishop Fiorenza (2005)

Pope John XXIII erected the Diocese of San Angelo on October 16, 1961. Most of its territory of the new diocese came primarily from the Diocese of Amarillo, but it received several counties from the Dioceses of Austin, El Paso and Dallas-Fort Worth. According to legend, one reason the pope chose San Angelo as the episcopal see was that his first name was Angelo. According to Bishop Michael Pfeifer:

The Church was growing here in a good way, a lot of people were coming into the church and felt it would be good to have a separate diocese. Plus, that was an extreme amount of territory for one bishop in Amarillo to cover — it's 450 miles from Amarillo to Junction.

John XXIII in 1961 selected Thomas Drury as the first bishop of San Angelo. Four years later, Drury became bishop of the Diocese of Corpus Christi. The second bishop was Thomas Tschoepe, nominated in 1966. Three years later, Tschoepe was installed as bishop of Dallas.

Auxiliary Bishop Stephen Leven of the Archdiocese of San Antonio was appointed bishop of San Angelo by Pope Paul VI in 1969 Leven is credited with making the Diocese of San Angelo financially solvent. He also initiated the permanent diaconate program, which ordained over sixty men. Leven retired in 1979.

To replace Leven, Pope John Paul II appointed Joseph Fiorenza as the next bishop of San Angelo in 1979. He became Archbishop of Galveston-Houston in 1984. As of 1985, Michael Pfeifer was the next bishop of San Angelo. After 28 years as bishop, Pfeifer retired in 2013. Michael Sis from the Diocese of Austin was appointed in 2013.

=== Sex abuse ===
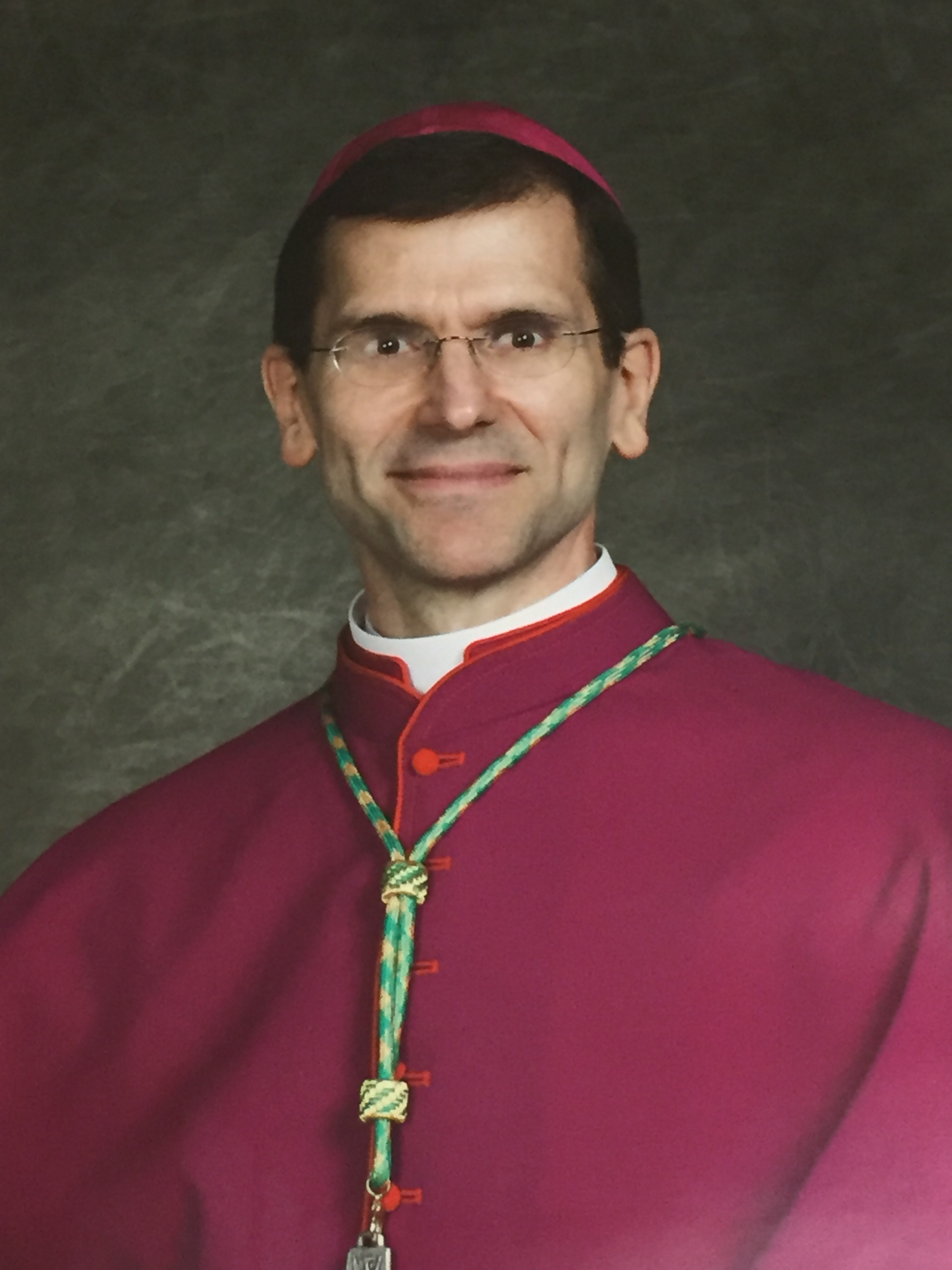
Bishop Sis (2020)

In 2008, Bishop Pfeifer and the Diocese of San Angelo were sued by a San Angelo man. The plaintiff claimed that Rev. David Espitia of St. Ann's Parish in Colorado City had sexually abused him from 1994, when he was age eight, to 2002, and that the diocese covered up the crimes. In response, Pfeifer said that Espita had told him about the allegations and had denied all of them in 2003. Pfeifer initiated an investigation at that time. A week after his meeting with Pfeifer, Espita committed suicide. The diocese reached an out-of-court settlement with the plaintiff in 2011.

The 2018 Pennsylvania Grand Jury Report on sexual abuse by clergy included a section on the transfer of Thomas C. Kelley from the Diocese of Erie in Pennsylvania, to the Diocese of San Angelo, despite Kelley's record of sexual abuse of young men. Five Pennsylvania men had accused Kelley of making sexual advances towards them, either at a high school or in the seminary. The Diocese of Erie negotiated a financial settlement with one victim and sent Kelley out of town for treatment twice. Both of Kelley's treatment facilities released him with recommendations that he have no contact with young parishioners.

In 1995, Kelley requested a transfer to San Angelo. Pfeiffer agreed to Kelley's transfer to Texas without any restrictions. During Kelley's ten years in San Angelo, there were no allegations of abuse filed against him; he died in 2005. Pfeifer refused in 2018 to comment on the Kelley story.

In January 2019, the Diocese of San Angelo published a list of 12 priests and one deacon with credible accusations of sexual abuse of children. One of those listed had died in prison, while two others were laicized and five removed from ministry. The accused clergy who weren't disciplined are deceased.

== Bishops ==
=== Bishops of San Angelo ===
1. Thomas Joseph Drury (1961–1965), appointed Bishop of Corpus Christi
2. Thomas Ambrose Tschoepe (1966–1969), appointed Bishop of Dallas
3. Stephen Aloysius Leven (1969–1979)
4. Joseph Anthony Fiorenza (1979–1984), appointed Bishop and later Archbishop of Galveston-Houston (2004)
5. Michael David Pfeifer (1985–2013)
6. Michael Sis (2014–present)

=== Other diocesan priest who became bishop ===
Joe Steve Vásquez, appointed Auxiliary Bishop of Galveston-Houston in 2001, later Bishop of Austin (2010), and presently Archbishop of Galveston-Houston (2025).

== Education ==
As of 2025, the Diocese of San Angelo had three elementary schools and one high school, with an approximate total enrollment of 800 students.
