= Jameson Houston =

American football player (born 1996)

No. 31, 11, 1
- Position: Cornerback

Personal information
- Born: June 30, 1996 (age 30); Austin, Texas, U.S.
- Listed height: 5 ft 11 in (1.80 m)
- Listed weight: 200 lb (91 kg)

Career information
- High school: St. Michael's Catholic Academy (Austin)
- College: Baylor (2015-2019)
- NFL draft: 2020: undrafted

Career history
- Cleveland Browns (2020)*; Carolina Panthers (2020)*; Philadelphia Eagles (2020); Jacksonville Jaguars (2021)*; Michigan Panthers (2022); Seattle Seahawks (2022)*; Vegas Vipers (2023)*; San Antonio Brahmas (2023); Minnesota Vikings (2023)*
- * Offseason or practice squad member only
- Stats at Pro Football Reference

Jameson Houston (born June 30, 1996) is an American former professional football cornerback. He played college football at Baylor.

== Professional career ==
=== Cleveland Browns ===
Houston was signed by the Cleveland Browns as an undrafted free agent. He was waived by the Browns on August 10, 2020.

=== Carolina Panthers ===
Houston was signed by the Carolina Panthers on August 28, 2020, after participating in a tryout, re-uniting him with his college coach Matt Rhule. He was waived on September 7, 2020, during final roster cuts.

=== Philadelphia Eagles ===
Houston was brought in for a tryout with the Philadelphia Eagles on November 20, 2020, and was signed to the team's practice squad on November 25. He was elevated to the active roster on December 12, December 19, and January 3, 2021, for the team's weeks 14, 15, and 17 games against the New Orleans Saints, Arizona Cardinals, and Washington Football Team, and reverted to the practice squad after each game. He signed a reserve/future contract with the Eagles on January 4, 2021.

=== Jacksonville Jaguars ===
On May 18, 2021, Houston was traded to the Jacksonville Jaguars along with a 2023 sixth-round pick in exchange for Josiah Scott. He was waived on August 24, 2021.

=== Michigan Panthers ===
Houston was selected with the fifth pick of the ninth round of the 2022 USFL draft by the Michigan Panthers.

=== Seattle Seahawks ===
On August 10, 2022, Houston signed with the Seattle Seahawks. He was waived on August 28.

=== Vegas Vipers ===
Houston was one of the defensive backs selected by the Vegas Vipers in the 2023 XFL draft. He was released during final roster cuts.

=== San Antonio Brahmas ===
Houston signed with the San Antonio Brahmas on April 11, 2023. He was released on July 10, 2023.

=== Minnesota Vikings ===
On August 25, 2023, Houston signed with the Minnesota Vikings. He was waived on August 28, 2023.
