= Stephen Aloysius Leven =

Roman Catholic Church Bishop of San Angelo (1905–1983)

His Excellency, The Most Reverend Stephen Aloysius Leven
- Bishop of San Angelo
- Church: Roman Catholic
- See: San Angelo
- In office: 1969–1979
- Predecessor: Thomas Ambrose Tschoepe
- Successor: Joseph Anthony Fiorenza
- Previous posts: Bishop of San Antonio (auxiliary), Bishop of Bure (titular); Bishop

Orders
- Ordination: June 10, 1928 by Francis Clement Kelley
- Consecration: February 8, 1956 by Eugene J. McGuinness

Personal details
- Born: April 30, 1905 Blackwell, Oklahoma
- Died: June 28, 1983 (aged 78) Blackwell
- Education: St. Gregory's College; St. Benedict's College; St. Mary's Seminary; American College of the Immaculate Conception
- Motto: Evangelizans Christus Jesum (Evangelizing Jesus Christ)

Stephen Aloysius Leven (April 30, 1905 – June 28, 1983) was an American Catholic prelate who served as Bishop of San Angelo from 1969 to 1979. He previously served as an auxiliary bishop for the Archdiocese of San Antonio from 1956 to 1969.

== Biography ==
=== Early life and education ===
Stephen Leven was born on April 30, 1905, in Blackwell, Oklahoma, to Joseph J. and Gertrude (née Conrady) Leven. One of nine children, he was raised on farms around Ponca City and Newkirk, Oklahoma, where his father was a sharecropper. He received his early education at St. Mary's School in Ponca City and St. Francis Academy in Newkirk. He then attended St. Gregory's College in Shawnee, Oklahoma, and later St. Benedict's College in Atchison, Kansas. He studied for the priesthood at St. Mary's Seminary in Houston, Texas, for a year before entering the American College of the Immaculate Conception in Leuven, Belgium in 1922.

=== Ordination and ministry ===
Leven was ordained a priest for the Diocese of Oklahoma in Ponca City on June 10, 1928 by Bishop Francis Clement Kelley. At age 23, he was below the age requirement for ordination but was granted a dispensation by Pope Pius XI. After his ordination, the diocese assigned Leven as a curate at the Cathedral of Our Lady of Perpetual Help Parish in Oklahoma City, where he remained for four years. During that period, he also served as secretary to Bishop Francis Kelley for two years. Leven served as a pastor in Bristow and Drumright, Oklahoma from 1932 to 1935. In 1933, he began a street preaching ministry based on the work of the Catholic Evidence Guild. On one occasion, the Ku Klux Klan burned a cross as a personal threat at a corner where Leven was accustomed to preach.

From 1935 to 1938, Leven served as vice-rector of the American College at Louvain. Following his return to Oklahoma, he was appointed a pastor at a parish Tonkawa and his native Blackwell in 1938. From 1939 to 1940, he served as director of the National Center of the Confraternity of Christian Doctrine. During World War II, Leven served as the official Vatican representative to nine German prisoner of war camps in Oklahoma.

=== Auxiliary Bishop of San Antonio ===
On December 3, 1955, Leven was appointed auxiliary bishop of San Antonio and titular bishop of Bure by Pope Pius XII. He was consecrated on February 8, 1956, by Bishop Eugene J. McGuinness, with Bishops Thomas Kiely Gorman and James A. McNulty serving as co-consecrators, at the Cathedral of Our Lady of Perpetual Help. As an auxiliary bishop, he assisted Archbishop Robert E. Lucey in performing confirmations and ordinations. Between 1962 and 1965, he attended all four sessions of the Second Vatican Council in Rome. At the Council, he defended non-Catholics by saying, "It just is not bearable to hear them talked about as some kind of strange entity or freak." He also spoke in favor of the increased participation of the laity.

=== Bishop of San Angelo ===
Leven was appointed the third bishop of San Angelo on October 20, 1969 by Pope Paul VI. His installation took place at Sacred Heart Cathedral on November 25, 1969. Credited with making the diocese financially solvent, he resolved several long-standing financial problems. He also initiated the permanent diaconate program, which trained and ordained more than 60 men to serve as deacons in parishes and missions across the diocese.

Leven resigned as bishop of San Angelo due to poor health on April 24, 1979. He retired to his native Blackwell, where he died on June 28, 1983, at age 78.

Catholic Church titles
Preceded by Thomas Ambrose Tschoepe	Bishop of San Angelo; 1969–1979	Succeeded by Joseph Anthony Fiorenza
Preceded by –	Auxiliary Bishop of San Antonio; 1955–1969	Succeeded by –
