= Diocese of Austin =

Latin Catholic jurisdiction in the US

Coordinates: 30.2500°N 97.7500°W

Diocese of Austin Dioecesis Austiniensis
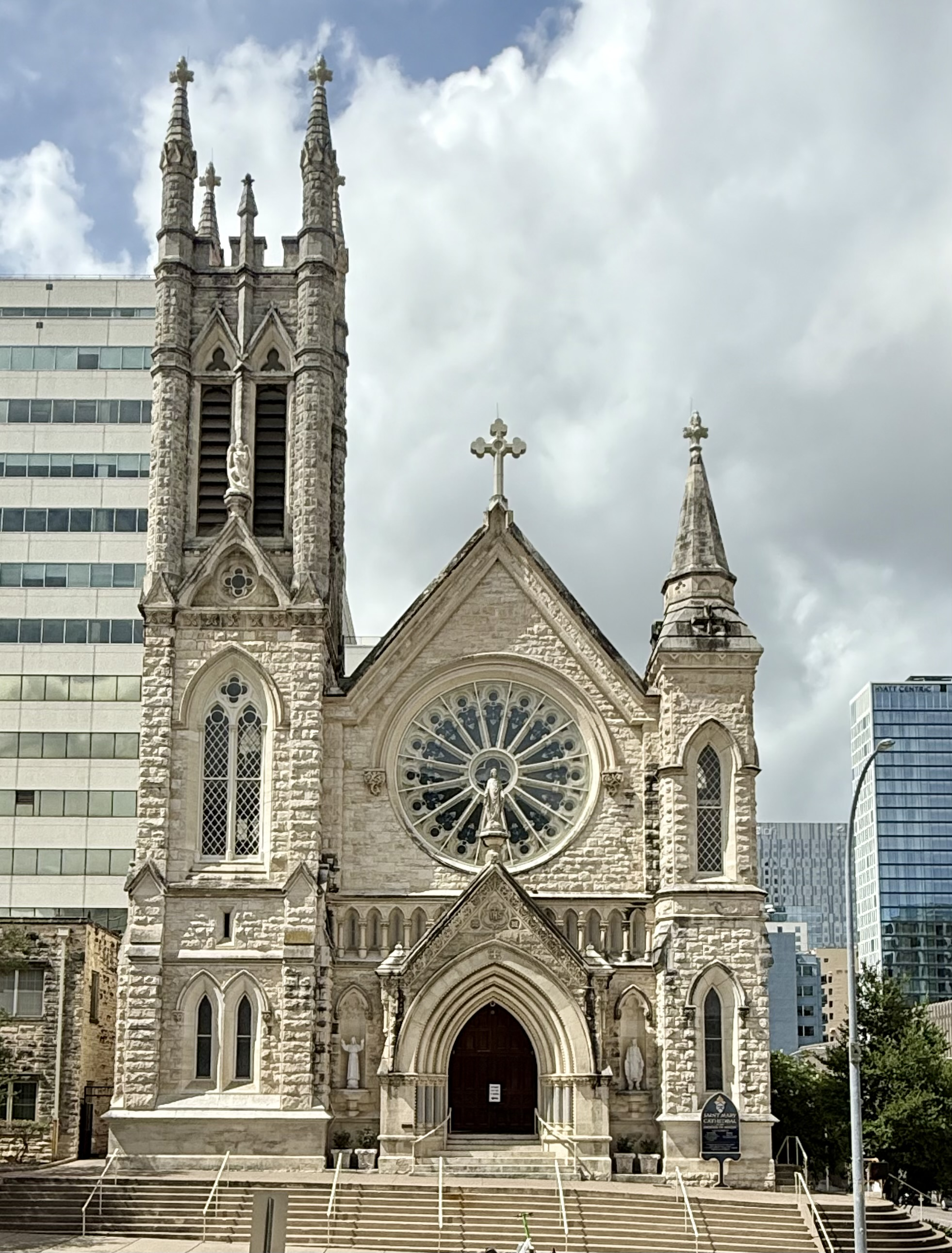
- St. Mary's Cathedral

- Coat of arms

Location
- Country: United States
- Territory: Counties of Bastrop, Bell, Blanco, Brazos, Burleson, Burnet, Caldwell, Coryell, Falls, Hamilton, Hays, Lampasas, Lee, Limestone, Llano, Mason, McLennan, Milam, Mills, Robertson, San Saba, Travis, Washington, and Williamson, and the part of Fayette County north of the Colorado River
- Ecclesiastical province: Roman Catholic Archdiocese of Galveston-Houston

Statistics
- Area: 57,424 km^{2} (22,172 sq mi)
- Population: Total; Catholics: (as of 2016); 3,093,312; 571,335 (18.5%)
- Parishes: 123

Information
- Denomination: Catholic
- Sui iuris church: Latin Church
- Rite: Roman Rite
- Established: November 15, 1947
- Cathedral: St. Mary's Cathedral, Austin
- Patron saint: Our Lady of the Immaculate Conception

Current leadership
- Pope: Leo XIV
- Bishop: Daniel E. Garcia
- Metropolitan Archbishop: Joe S. Vásquez

Map
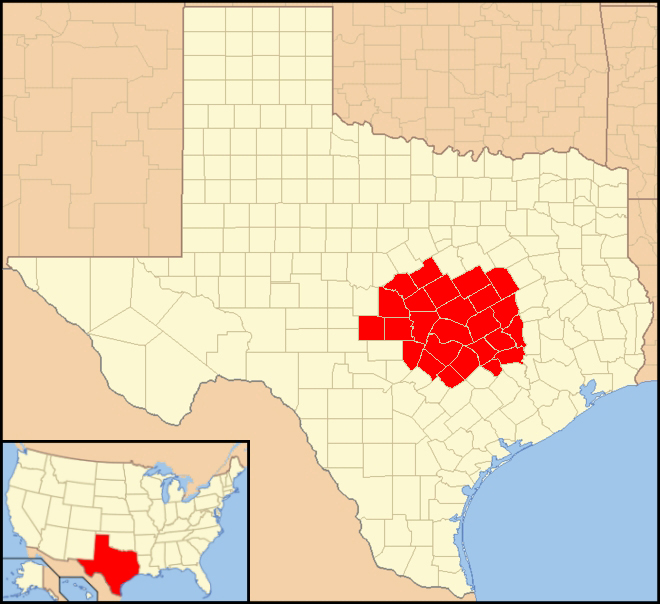

Website
- austindiocese.org

The Diocese of Austin (Latin: Dioecesis Austiniensis) is a diocese of the Catholic Church in Central Texas in the United States, with the see city in Austin. It is a suffragan diocese in the ecclesiastical province of the metropolitan Archdiocese of Galveston-Houston. As of 2026, Daniel E. Garcia is the bishop of Austin.

== Territory ==
The Diocese of Austin includes 123 parishes and missions and six Catholic student centers at universities.

The diocese consists of the counties of Bastrop, Bell, Blanco, Brazos, Burleson, Burnet, Caldwell, Coryell, Falls, Hamilton, Hays, Lampasas, Lee, Limestone, Llano, Mason, McLennan, Milam, Mills, Robertson, San Saba, Travis, Washington, and Williamson. The diocese also consists of Fayette County north of the Colorado River. The portion south of the river belongs to the Diocese of Victoria in Texas.

The largest metropolitan areas in the diocese are Austin, Bryan–College Station, the Killeen – Temple – Fort Hood area and Waco.

== History ==
=== 1600 to 1800 ===
The first Catholic mission in Texas, then part of the Spanish colony of New Spain, was San Francisco de los Tejas. It was founded by the Franciscan priest, Damián Massanet, in 1690 in the Weches area. The priests left the mission after three years, then established a second mission, Nuestro Padre San Francisco de los Tejas, near present-day Alto in 1716.

By the middle of the 18th century, most of the missions in Texas had become unsustainable and were abandoned by the Franciscans. After the Mexican War of Independence ended in 1821, the few Catholics in Central Texas came under the jurisdiction of a Mexican diocese.

=== 1800 to 1900 ===
In 1839, three years after the founding of the Republic of Texas, Pope Gregory XVI erected the prefecture apostolic of Texas, covering its present-day area. The prefecture was elevated to a vicariate apostolic in 1846, shortly after Texas became an American state. In 1847, Pope Pius IX elevated the vicariate into the Diocese of Galveston. The Austin area would remain part of several Texas dioceses for the next 139 years.

The first Catholic church in Austin, St. Patrick, was constructed in 1852. In 1866, the parish built a new church, which they renamed as St. Mary's. St. Mary’s Church of the Assumption, founded in 1869, was the first Catholic church in Waco. In 1872, Edward Sorin of the Holy Cross Fathers and Brothers, the founder of the University of Notre Dame in Indiana, moved to Austin in 1873 to establish a Catholic school. Using a donated farm, he opened St. Edward's Academy in Austin in 1878. Today it is St. Edward's University.

The first Catholic church in Bryan–College Station, St. Joseph's, was dedicated in 1873. Christ the King Parish, the first in Belton, was established in 1898 as a mission church.

=== 1900 to 1950 ===
The Daughters of Charity of St. Vincent de Paul came to Waco in 1903 to build the first hospital in that community. The Providence Sanitarium opened in 1904. Today it is Ascension Providence Hospital. The Ladies of Charity of Austin opened the Home of the Holy Childhood in Austin in 1921 to care for abandoned infants. Bryan Hospital was purchased by the Sisters of St. Francis of Sylvania in 1936; they renamed it St. Joseph's Hospital. Today the facility is known as St. Joseph Health College Station Hospital.

The parishioners of Holy Cross Parish in Austin founded Holy Cross Hospital in 1940. Facing racial discrimination at other hospitals, this African-American parish wanted their own hospital staffed by African-American physicians.

Pope Pius XII erected the Diocese of Austin on November 15, 1947, and named Louis Reicher of the Diocese of Galveston as its first bishop. During his tenure, Reicher built or restored over 200 churches and facilities, Newman Centers on five college campuses, and six church-sponsored, low-rent housing projects.

=== 1950 to 1980 ===
Reicher opened a new chancery office for the diocese near the Texas State Capitol in 1958. The first Catholic church in Killeen, St. Joseph, was dedicated in 1960. The Vatican erected the Diocese of San Angelo in 1961, taking four counties from the Diocese of Austin. In 1964, Reicher transferred all of his personal wealth, approximately $5 million, to a trust fund providing direct assistance to the poor and sick along with low-interest loans to church institutions.

In 1971, Pope Paul VI named Bishop Vincent Harris of the Diocese of Beaumont as coadjutor bishop of the Diocese of Austin to assist Reicher. After Reicher retired later that year, Harris automatically replaced him.

While bishop, Harris was involved in a lawsuit against the Reicher trust fund. In July 1973, the Sacred Congregation for Bishops and the Sacred Congregation for the Clergy in Rome ruled that the Diocese of Austin should control the fund. Citing Texas law, the fund administrators refused to surrender control. Harris then filed suit that July against the trust. In the lawsuit, the diocese stated that diocesan funds had gone into the trust fund. In response to the church position, Reicher made this statement:

Never were any funds of any diocese used in creating this trust . . . Let me assure you that I have not alienated any diocesan property.”

=== 1980 to 2000 ===
After two years of litigation on the Reicher trust fund, the diocese and the fund trustees reached a settlement. Harris retired as bishop of Austin in 1984. To replace Harris, Pope John Paul II appointed Auxiliary Bishop John E. McCarthy of the Diocese of Galveston-Houston as the next bishop of Austin. In 1987, McCarthy attended the National Black Catholic Congress. After returning to Austin, he established the Office of Black Catholics to focus on African American ministry within the diocese.

McCarthy encouraged parishes to focus on their social advocacy and charity work. He also established missionary programs both abroad and at home. McCarthy established the Diocesan Law Project, which recruited hundreds of attorneys and interpreters to volunteer legal services for the needy.

=== 2000 to 2020 ===
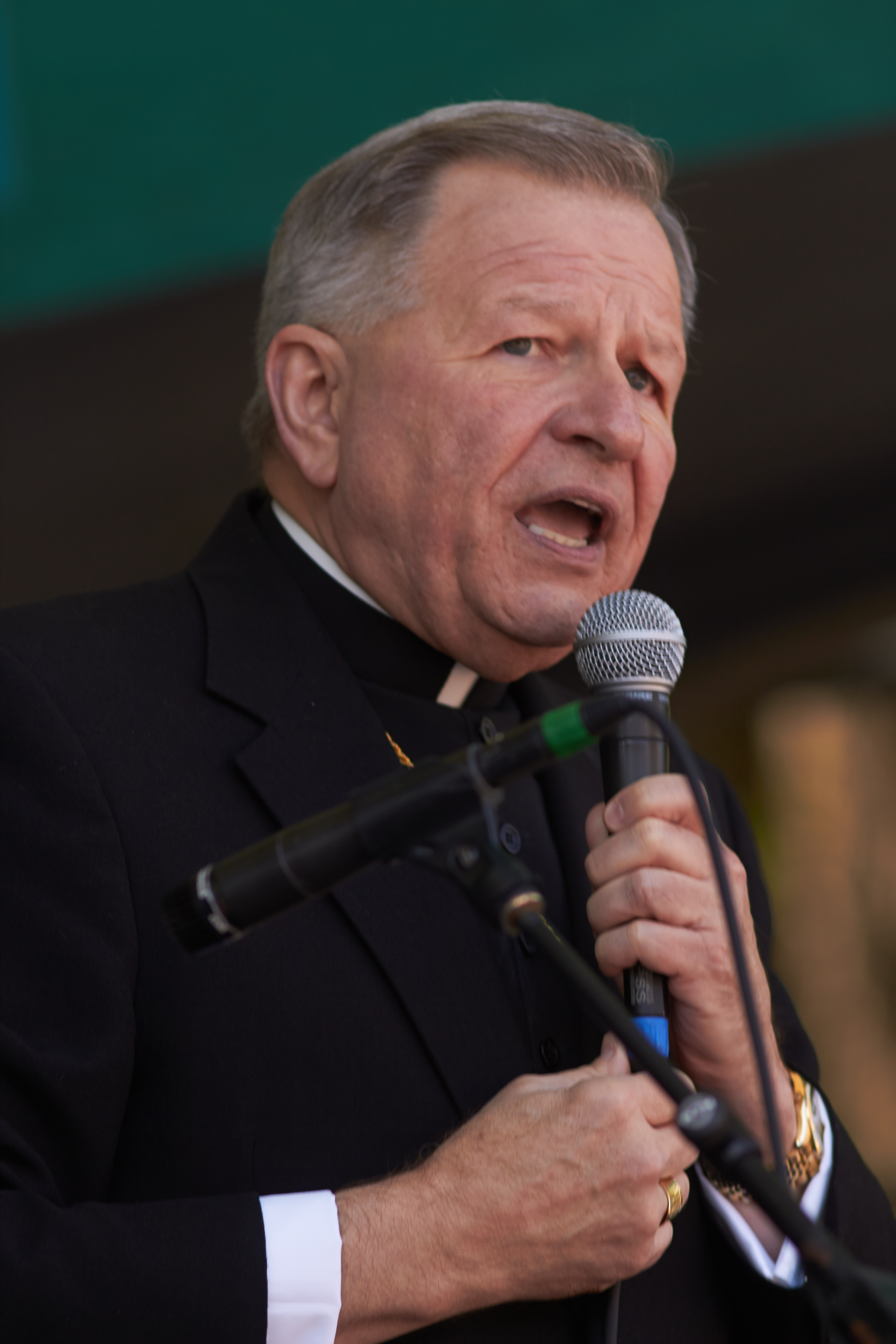
Bishop Aymond (2013)

Auxiliary Bishop Gregory Aymond of the Archdiocese of New Orleans was named as coadjutor bishop of Austin by John Paul II in 2000 to assist McCarthy. Aymond became bishop automatically after McCarthy retired in 2001. The diocese grew rapidly (partly as a result of immigration) during Aymond's tenure and actually had more churchgoers than many archdioceses, including New Orleans after Hurricane Katrina. In 2003, a man accused priest Dan Delaney of sexually abusing him in a hotel during a youth trip when he was a child. A $250,000 settlement was reached. After appointing Aymond as archbishop of New Orleans in 2009, Pope Benedict XVI in 2010 named Auxiliary Bishop Joe S. Vásquez of the Archdiocese of Galveston-Houston as the new bishop of Austin.

In 2015, Pope Francis appointed Daniel E. Garcia as the first auxiliary bishop in the diocese. At the time of his appointment, Garcia was serving as vicar general and moderator of the curia. Garcia was named bishop of the Diocese of Monterey in 2018 by Francis.

In March 2018, Gerold Langsch, a diocesan priest, was arrested on charges of sexually assaulting a woman in hospice care. The victim stated that Langsch massaged her breast with oil while administering her Last Rites. The diocese immediately suspended him from ministerial duties. In June 2019, Langsch pleaded no contest to misdemeanor charges and was sentenced to 300 days of probation. In July 2020, three women, including the woman in hospice care who recovered, sued the diocese, stating they were groped by Langsch. The diocese settled the lawsuit in August 2020. In January 2019, the diocese released a list of 22 clerics with credible accusations of sexual abuse of a minor.

A fire destroyed the historic Church of the Visitation in Westphalia in 2019. The federal Bureau of Alcohol, Tobacco, Firearms and Explosives joined the fire investigation to determine if it was an act of arson. In August 2019, the State Fire Marshal ruled the cause of the fire to be undetermined.

=== 2020 to present ===
In 2023, Vásquez celebrated a mass for female death row inmates at the Mountain View Unit, a women's prison in Gatesville.

Francis named Vásquez as archbishop of Galveston-Houston in January 2025. In July 2025, Pope Leo XIV appointed Garcia as the new bishop of Austin. In September 2025, the diocese stopped a Catholic student group at Texas A&M University from having a Traditional Latin Mass celebrated on campus. The mass was to be performed by a priest from another diocese. A spokesman for Garcia said that the Diocese of Austin controls the celebrations of such masses, and it had received no request for permission from the students.

== Bishops ==
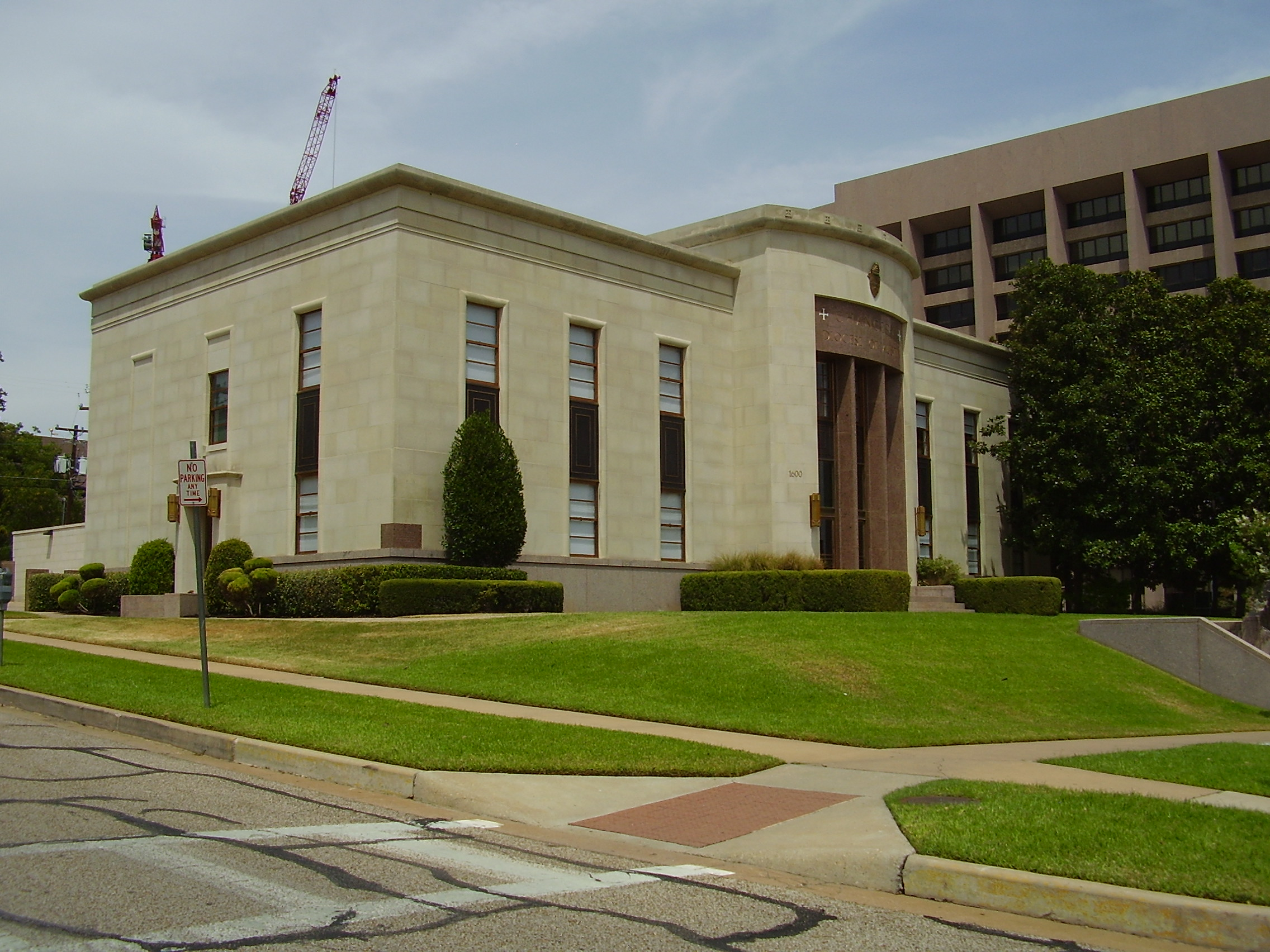
Chancery, Austin (2009)

=== Bishops of Austin ===
1. Louis Joseph Reicher (1947–1971)
2. Vincent Madeley Harris (1971–1985; Coadjutor 1971)
3. John E. McCarthy (1985–2001)
4. Gregory Michael Aymond (2001–2009; Coadjutor 2000–2001), appointed Archbishop of New Orleans
5. Joe S. Vásquez (2010–2025)
6. Daniel E. Garcia (2025-present)

=== Former Auxiliary Bishop of Austin ===
- Daniel E. Garcia (2015–2019), appointed Bishop of Monterey in California

=== Other bishops who were diocesan priests ===
- Patrick Zurek, appointed Bishop of Amarillo in 2008
- William Mulvey, appointed Bishop of Corpus Christi in 2010
- Michael J. Sis, appointed Bishop of San Angelo in 2013
- David A. Konderla, appointed Bishop of Tulsa in 2016
- William Albert Wack, CSC, appointed Bishop of Pensacola-Tallahassee in 2017
- James Misko, appointed Bishop of Tucson in 2026

== Coat of arms ==
The coat of arms of the Diocese of Austin is based on an old coat of arms associated with early Austen or Austin families (in honor of Stephen F. Austin).

== Other facilities ==
The diocese operates the Cedarbrake Catholic Retreat Center in Belton, Texas.

== Education ==
As of 2026, the Diocese of Austin has 20 schools with a total enrollment of approximately 5,300 students.

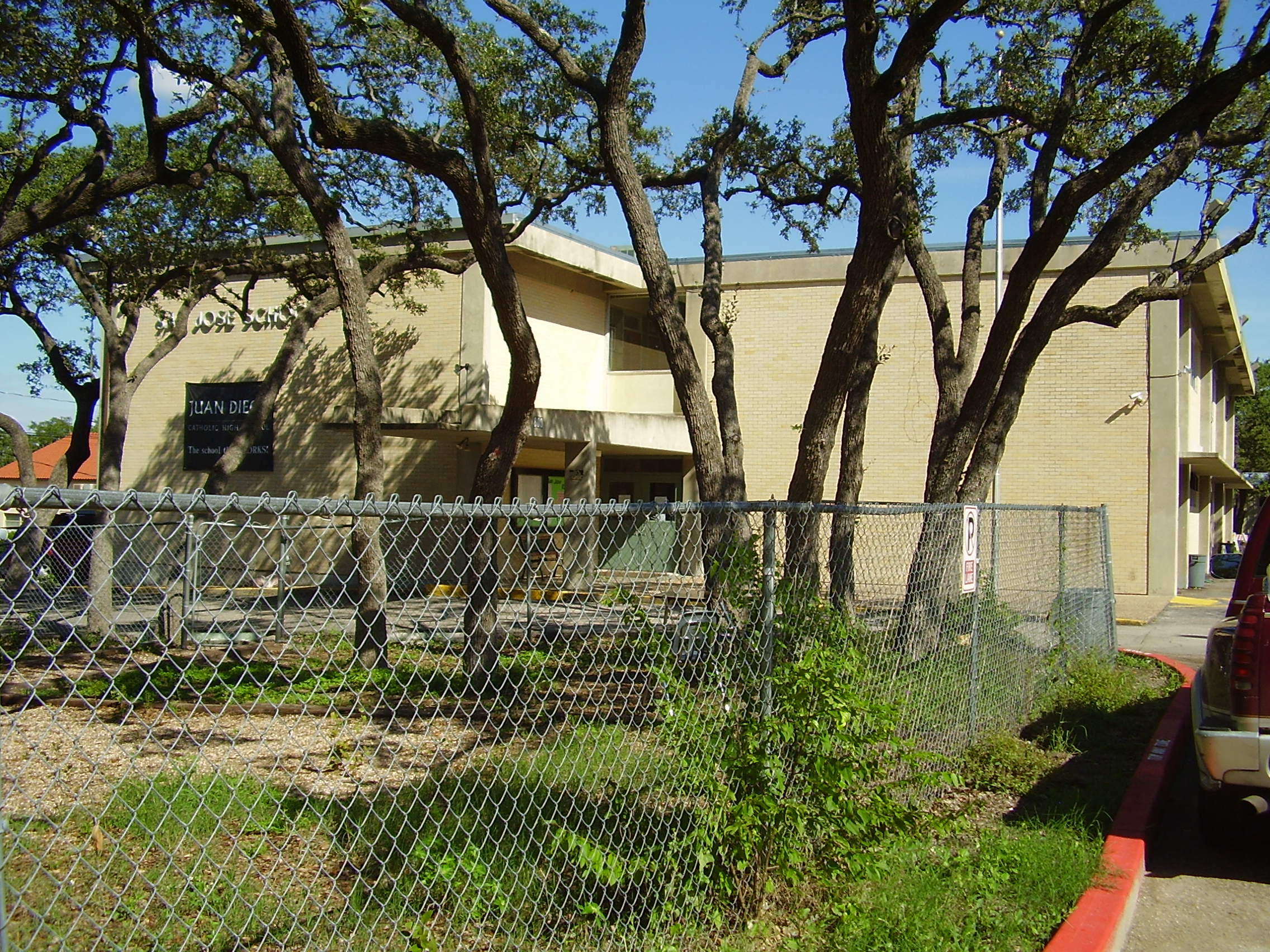
San Juan Diego Catholic High School – Austin

=== High schools ===
- High School at SCJS – Bryan
- Holy Trinity Catholic High School – Temple
- St. Dominic Savio Catholic High School – Austin
- San Juan Diego Catholic High School – Austin
- Bishop Louis Reicher – Waco
- St. Mary's Catholic School – Taylor
- St. Michael's Prep – Austin

== Financial status ==
The Central Administrative Office of the diocese showed revenues of $37.0 million for the fiscal year ending June 2022.
