= Michael David Pfeifer =

His Excellency, The Most Reverend Michael David Pfeifer O.M.I.
- Bishop Emeritus of San Angelo
- Church: Roman Catholic
- Diocese: San Angelo
- Appointed: May 31, 1985
- Installed: July 26, 1985
- Retired: December 12, 2013
- Predecessor: Joseph Anthony Fiorenza
- Successor: Michael Sis

Orders
- Ordination: December 21, 1964 by Stephen Aloysius Leven
- Consecration: July 26, 1985 by Patrick Flores, Joseph Fiorenza, and John Joseph Fitzpatrick

Personal details
- Born: May 18, 1937 (age 89) Alamo, Texas, US
- Motto: For Christ and his people through Mary

Styles of Michael David Pfeifer
- Reference style: His Excellency; The Most Reverend
- Spoken style: Your Excellency
- Religious style: Bishop

Michael David Pfeifer O.M.I. (born May 18, 1937) is an American prelate of the Roman Catholic Church. He served as bishop of the Diocese of San Angelo in Texas from 1985 to 2012. He is a member of the Missionary Oblates of Mary Immaculate (Oblates).

== Biography ==
=== Early life ===
Michael Pfeifer was born on May 18, 1937, in Alamo, Texas, the son of Maund Pfeifer and Alice Clausney Savage. He grew up on a family farm, dealing with periods of poverty. Pfeifer entered St. Anthony’s Junior Seminary at age 13. He took his first vows with the Oblates on May 31,1958

=== Priesthood ===
On December 21, 1964, Pfeifer was ordained into the priesthood by Bishop Stephen Leven for the Oblates. After his ordination, the Oblates assigned Pfeifer as a missionary in Mexico for several years.

=== Bishop of San Angelo ===
On May 31, 1985, Pope John Paul II named Pfeifer as bishop of San Angelo. He was consecrated by Archbishop Patrick Flores at the San Angelo Coliseum in San Angelo, Texas, on July 26, 1985.

Pfeifer has spoken against medical research using embryonic stem cells, instead promoting the use of adult stem cells.

In December 2008, Pfeifer and the Diocese of San Angelo were sued by a San Angelo man. The plaintiff claimed that Reverend David Espitia, pastor of St. Ann's Parish in Colorado City, Texas, had sexually abused him from 1994, when he was age eight, to 2002 and that the diocese covered up the crimes. In response, Pfeifer said that Espita told him on June 13, 2003, about the allegations and denied all of them. At that time, Pfeifer initiated an investigation. A week after his meeting with Pfeifer, Espita committed suicide. On November 21, 2011, the diocese reached an out-of-court settlement with the plaintiff.

The 2018 Pennsylvania Grand Jury Report on sexual abuse by clergy included a section on the transfer of Reverend Thomas C. Kelley, a priest from the Diocese of Erie in Pennsylvania, to San Angelo, despite a record of sexual abuse of young men. Five men aged 28 to 25 accused Kelley of sexual advances either at a high school or in the seminary; one man received a financial settlement from the Diocese of Erie. Kelley was sent to for psychological treatment twice; both facilities released him with recommendations to have no contact with young parishioners.

In 1995, Kelley requested a transfer to San Angelo. Pfeifer had a conversation in 1995 with Erie Bishop Donald Trautman in which they discussed Kelley's record and his transfer. Pfeiffer eventually agreed to Kelley's transfer without any restrictions. There were no allegations of abuse filed against Kelley during his ten years in the San Angelo; he died in 2005. Pfeifer has refused to comment on the story. Bishop Michael Sis, the current bishop of San Angelo, said he felt hurt and angry about the Kelley allegations.

=== Retirement ===
Pfeifer submitted his resignation letter as bishop of San Angelo to Pope Benedict XVI on Pfeifer's 75th birthday on May 18, 2012. Pope Francis accepted Pfeifer's resignation on December 12, 2013.

== See also ==
- Catholic Church hierarchy
- Catholic Church in the United States
- Historical list of the Catholic bishops of the United States
- List of Catholic bishops of the United States
- Lists of patriarchs, archbishops, and bishops

== Episcopal succession ==
Catholic Church titles
Preceded by Joseph Anthony Fiorenza	Bishop of San Angelo; 1985-2013	Succeeded by Michael Sis
