= Michael Sis =

American Catholic prelate (born 1960)

His Excellency, The Most Reverend Michael Sis
- Bishop of San Angelo
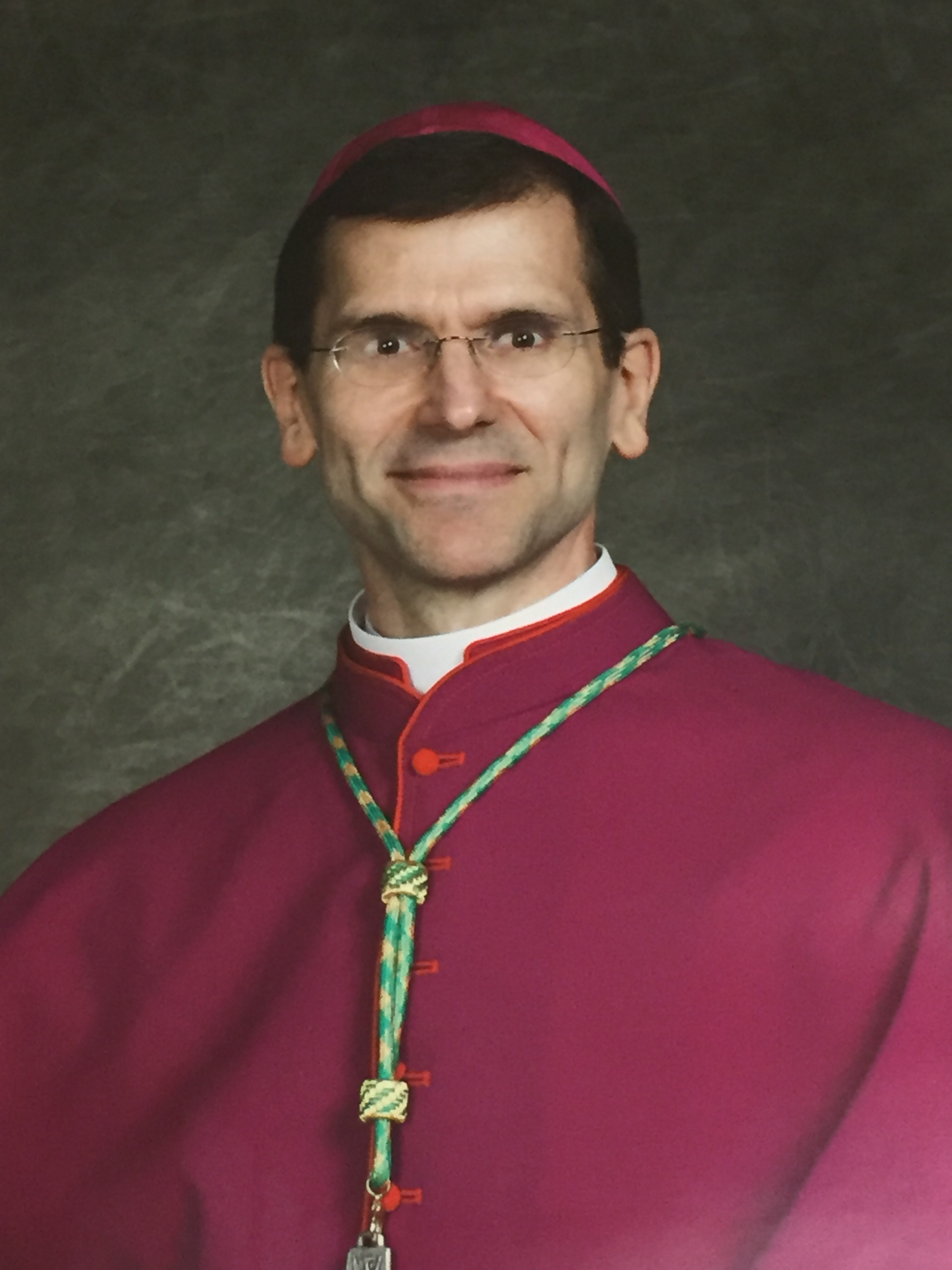
- Diocese: San Angelo
- Appointed: December 12, 2013
- Installed: January 27, 2014
- Predecessor: Michael David Pfeifer

Orders
- Ordination: July 19, 1986 by John E. McCarthy
- Consecration: January 27, 2014 by Gustavo García-Siller, Michael David Pfeifer, and Joe S. Vásquez

Personal details
- Born: January 9, 1960 (age 66) Mt. Holly, New Jersey, US
- Education: University of Notre Dame; Alphonsian Academy; Pontifical Gregorian University
- Motto: Dei sumus audiutores (Latin for 'We are God's co-workers')
- Styles
- Reference style: His Excellency; The Most Reverend
- Spoken style: Your Excellency
- Religious style: Bishop

Ordination history
History
Episcopal consecration
- Consecrated by: Gustavo García-Siller (Archbishop of San Antonio)

Michael James Sis (born January 9, 1960) is an American Catholic prelate who has served as Bishop of San Angelo since 2013.

== Biography ==
=== Early life and education ===
Sis was born on January 9, 1960, in Mt. Holly, New Jersey. He was the fourth of five children born to Raymond and Janice (née Murphy) Sis. The family later moved to Bryan, Texas, where he attended St. Joseph School. As a teenager, he volunteered in religious education and youth programs in his parish. Sis graduated from Bryan High School in 1978.

Sis earned a Bachelor of Arts degree in philosophy in 1982 from the Moreau Seminary at the University of Notre Dame in Notre Dame, Indiana. Sis spent a summer of missionary service in Tanzania. He continued his studies in Rome, earning a Bachelor of Theology degree from the Pontifical Gregorian University and a Licentiate in Moral Theology from the Alphonsian Academy of the Pontifical Lateran University. While in Rome, Sis performed volunteer work with Ethiopian refugees.

=== Priesthood ===
Sis was ordained a priest by Bishop John E. McCarthy for the Diocese of Austin on July 19, 1986, at St. Louis Church in Austin, Texas.After his 1986 ordination, the diocese assigned Sis as associate pastor at Cristo Rey Parish in Austin. He took on the additional task of associate pastor in campus ministry at Texas A&M University in College Station, Texas in 1989.

From 1990 to 1992, Sis left Cristo Rey and the university to serve as the associate pastor at St. Mary's Cathedral Parish in Austin. He then returned to Texas A&M as associate pastor in 1992. Sis served as pastor at the university from 1993 to 2006.

In 2006, Sis left Texas A&M to become the vocation director for the diocese. He was reassigned in 2009 as pastor of St. Thomas More Parish in Austin, then in 2010 was named the vicar general and moderator of the curia of the diocese. Sis also served on the presbyteral council, the priest personnel board, the college of consultors, the Vocation Team, the Permanent Diaconate Admissions Committee, and the Bishop's Advisory Council.

=== Bishop of San Angelo ===
Pope Francis named Sis as the bishop of San Angelo on December 12, 2013. He was consecrated a bishop on January 27, 2014, by Archbishop Gustavo García-Siller; Bishop Michael Pfeifer and Bishop Joe S. Vásquez were the co-consecrators. The liturgy was celebrated in the Junell Center at Angelo State University in San Angelo, Texas. Sis's father, Deacon Raymond Sis, assisted at the consecration.

Sis in January 2019 released a list of 13 clerics from the diocese with credible accusations of sexual abuse of children.

== Viewpoints ==
=== Anti-Semitism ===
In December 2023, Sis organized an interfaith Hanukkah celebration to emphasize his condemnation of anti-semitism and support for Jews.

== See also ==
- Catholic Church hierarchy
- Catholic Church in the United States
- Historical list of the Catholic bishops of the United States
- List of Catholic bishops of the United States
- Lists of patriarchs, archbishops, and bishops

== Episcopal succession ==
Catholic Church titles
| Preceded by Michael David Pfeifer | Bishop of San Angelo; 2014–Present | Succeeded by Incumbent |
