= San Juan Diego Catholic High School (Austin, Texas) =

Location
- 2512 S. 1st. St. Austin, (Travis County), Texas 78704; United States
- 30°14′27″N 97°45′47″W

Information
- Type: Private, Coeducational
- Motto: Our School Works!
- Religious affiliation: Roman Catholic
- Established: 2002
- Superintendent: Misty Poe
- School code: 440350
- Director: Blake Evans
- Principal: Blake Evans
- Grades: 9–12
- Student to teacher ratio: 10:1
- Colors: Black, red (color) red, and white
- Team name: Saints
- Accreditation: Texas Catholic Conference Education Department
- Dean of Academics: Alan Prater
- Admissions Director: Marcela Pinto
- Athletic Director: Gerard Cisneros
- Corporate Internship Director: Anita Spadaro
- Website: www.sjdchs.org

San Juan Diego Catholic High School (SJDCHS) is a private, Roman Catholic high school in Austin, Texas. It is located in the Roman Catholic Diocese of Austin.

== Background ==
In August 2002, Archbishop Gregory M. Aymond opened San Juan Diego Catholic High School. San Juan Diego is modeled after Cristo Rey Jesuit High School in Chicago.

Each student at San Juan Diego works toward a Distinguished Achievement diploma, which includes 30 credits and 80 hours of community service.

== Location ==
The school is located on the campus of San Jose Catholic Church in central Austin, near the intersection of Oltorf and South First Streets.
