= Vincent Madeley Harris =

Catholic bishop from the United States

His Excellency, The Most Reverend Vincent Madeley Harris
- Bishop of Austin; Titular Bishop of Rotaria
- Church: Roman Catholic Church
- See: Diocese of Austin
- In office: November 15, 1971; February 25, 1985
- Predecessor: Louis Joseph Reicher
- Successor: John E. McCarthy
- Other posts: Bishop of Beaumont; 1966 to 1971

Orders
- Ordination: March 19, 1938 by Ralph Leo Hayes
- Consecration: September 28, 1966 by John Louis Morkovsky

Personal details
- Born: October 14, 1913 Conroe, Texas, US
- Died: March 31, 1988 (aged 74) Houston, Texas, US
- Education: Pontifical Gregorian University; Catholic University of America
- Motto: Sicut qui ministrat (As one who serves)
- Coat of arms

Vincent Madeley Harris (October 14, 1913 – March 31, 1988) was an American prelate of the Roman Catholic Church. He served as bishop of the Diocese of Beaumont in Texas from 1966 to 1971 and as coadjutor bishop and bishop of the Diocese of Austin in Texas from 1971 to 1985.

== Biography ==
=== Early life ===
Vincent Harris was born on October 14, 1913, in Conroe, Texas, to George Malcolm and Margaret (née Madeley) Harris. After graduating from Sam Houston High School in Houston, Texas, in 1931, he attended St. Mary's Seminary in La Porte, Texas. In 1934, Harris was sent by Bishop Christopher Byrne to study at the Pontifical Gregorian University in Rome. He earned a Bachelor of Sacred Theology degree there in 1936.

=== Priesthood ===
While in Rome, Harris was ordained to the priesthood for the Diocese of Galveston by Bishop Ralph Hayes on March 19, 1938. He received a Bachelor of Canon Law degree magna cum laude from the Gregorian in 1939.

After returning to the United States, Harris enter the Catholic University of America in Washington, D.C., where he earned a Licentiate of Canon Law in 1940. Later that year, he went back to Galveston, where he was appointed a faculty member at St. Mary's Seminary. He was named chancellor of the diocese in 1948 and a diocesan consultor in 1953. Harris was raised to the rank of domestic prelate by Pope Pius XII in 1956.

=== Bishop of Beaumont ===
Coat of arms as bishop of Beaumont

On July 4, 1966, Harris was appointed the first bishop of the newly erected Diocese of Beaumont by Pope Paul VI. He received his episcopal consecration on September 28, 1966, from Bishop John Morkovsky, with Bishops Leo Byrne and James Hogan serving as co-consecrators, at St. Vincent de Paul Church in Houston. For the next five years, Harris worked to organize the new diocese and implement the decrees of the Second Vatican Council.

During the 1960s, Harris pressured the racially segregated Knights of Columbus councils in the diocese to admit African-Americans.

=== Coadjutor Bishop and Bishop of Austin ===
On April 27, 1971, Paul VI named Harris as coadjutor bishop of Austin and titular bishop of Rotaria. When Bishop Louis Reicher resigned on November 15, 1971, Harris automatically became the second bishop of Austin. During his tenure, the diocese increased in Catholic population but suffered repeated financial difficulties.

While bishop, Harris was involved in a lawsuit against a trust established by his predecessor, Bishop Louis Reicher. Reicher had built up $5 million in assets while a priest and bishop. In 1964, he transferred all of his wealth to a trust fund providing direct assistance to the poor and sick along with low-interest loans to Catholic institutions. In July 1973, the Sacred Congregation for Bishops and the Sacred Congregation for the Clergy in Rome ruled that the Diocese of Austin should control the Reicher trust fund. Citing Texas law, the laypeople running the trust refused to surrender control. Harris then filed suit against the trust. In the lawsuit, the diocese claimed that diocesan funds had gone into the trust fund. In response to the church position, Reicher made this statement:

Never were any funds of any diocese used in creating this trust . . . Let me assure you that I have not alienated any diocesan property.”

After two years of litigation, the two parties reached a settlement.

=== Retirement and legacy ===
After suffering a stroke in 1984, Harris tendered his resignation as bishop of Austin to Pope John Paul II. The pope accepted it on February 25, 1985. Harris spent his retirement in Houston, pursuing genealogy, photography, and computer systems. On March 31, 1988, Vincent Harris died at St. Anthony Nursing Home in Houston at age 74. He is buried at St. Anthony Cathedral in Beaumont, Texas.

== Viewpoints ==
=== Capital punishment ===
In 1977, Harris appeared at a committee meeting of the Texas Legislature in which he condemned capital punishment as out of respect for human life.

=== War ===
In 1981, Harris joined with Catholic bishops in Texas criticizing the development of a neutron bomb by the Reagan Administration. They termed it an unnecessary escalation of the nuclear arms race between NATO and the Warsaw Pact.

== See also ==
Catholic Church titles
Preceded by Louis Joseph Reicher	Bishop of Austin; 1971–1985	Succeeded by John E. McCarthy
Preceded by None	Bishop of Beaumont; 1966–1971	Succeeded by Warren Louis Boudreaux
