= Mitch Morse =

American football player (born 1992)

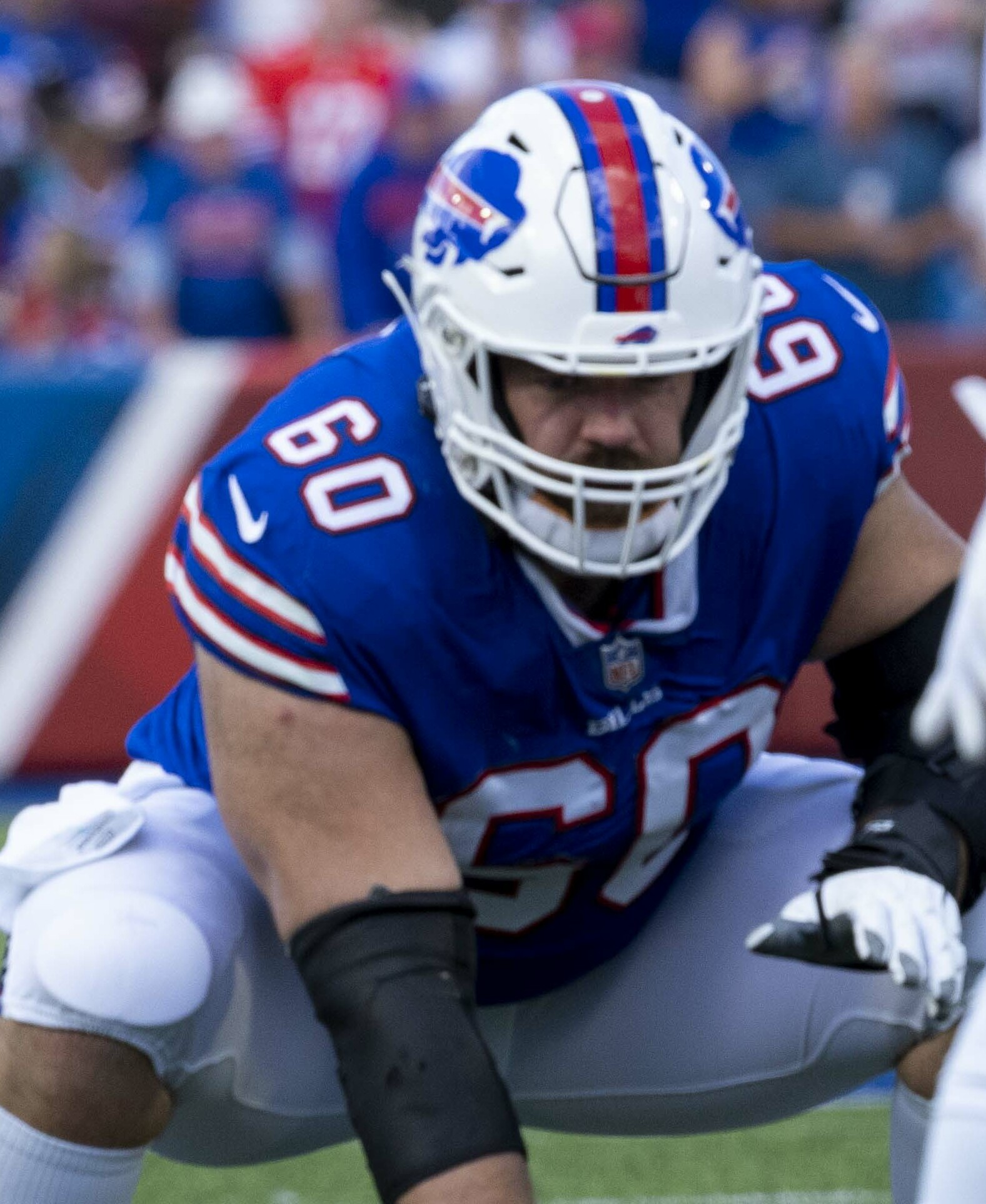
- Morse with the Buffalo Bills in 2021

No. 61, 60, 65
- Position: Center

Personal information
- Born: April 21, 1992 (age 34); Austin, Texas, U.S.
- Listed height: 6 ft 6 in (1.98 m)
- Listed weight: 305 lb (138 kg)

Career information
- High school: St. Michael's Catholic Academy (Austin)
- College: Missouri (2010–2014)
- NFL draft: 2015: 2nd round, 49th overall pick

Career history
- Kansas City Chiefs (2015–2018); Buffalo Bills (2019–2023); Jacksonville Jaguars (2024)

Awards and highlights
- Pro Bowl (2022); PFWA All-Rookie Team (2015); Second-team All-SEC (2014)

Career NFL statistics
- Games played: 143
- Games started: 143
- Stats at Pro Football Reference

Mitchell Morse (born April 21, 1992) is an American former professional football player who was a center for 10 seasons in the National Football League (NFL) for the Kansas City Chiefs, Buffalo Bills, and Jacksonville Jaguars. He played college football for the Missouri Tigers.

== Early life ==
Morse was born in Austin, Texas, to Kevin and Catherine Morse. He attended St. Michael's Catholic Academy where he played starting offensive lineman and defensive tackle positions. His performance as an offensive lineman during his junior and senior seasons earned Morse first-team all-state honors. During his senior season in 2009 as a defensive tackle, Morse earned first-team all-district honors. Morse was ranked No. 19 offensive tackle in the nation by ESPN.com. He was ranked No. 51 tackle prospect in the nation by Rivals.com. Morse twice won Academic All-State honors. His academic performance gained him offers from Kansas, Texas Christian, Stanford and Vanderbilt.

== College career ==
After sitting out the 2010 season, Morse played as a redshirt freshman in all 13 games with the Missouri Tigers team during the 2011 season. During his first active season, Morse's defensive skills were assigned to part of the placekicking protection team. The 2011 season also saw Morse earn 1st-Team Academic All-Big 12 honors and his first letter.

Morse saw his first starting season in 2012 as the Tigers' center. In this position, he started seven games. However the offensive lineup became plagued with injuries, assigning Morse to the alternate position of right tackle. Morse started in this position for the remaining four games. His place on the reorganized offensive line alongside left guard Max Copeland, left tackle Justin Britt, center Evan Boehm and right guard Connor McGovern, helped the Tigers make consecutive SEC Championship appearances during the 2013 and 2014 seasons.

During the 2012, 2013 and 2014 seasons, Morse made SEC Academic Honor Roll. While at Mizzou, Morse studied Hotel and Restaurant Management.

== Professional career ==
Pre-draft measurables
Height	Weight	Arm length	Hand span	40-yard dash	10-yard split	20-yard split	20-yard shuttle	Three-cone drill	Vertical jump	Broad jump	Bench press
6 ft 5 3/8 in (1.97 m)	305 lb (138 kg)	32 1/4 in (0.82 m)	9 1/4 in (0.23 m)	5.14 s	1.86 s	3.04 s	4.50 s	7.60 s	31.0 in (0.79 m)	9 ft 4 in (2.84 m)	36 reps
All values from NFL Combine

=== Kansas City Chiefs ===
Morse was selected by the Kansas City Chiefs in the second round, 49th overall, in the 2015 NFL draft. Morse was selected for the Pro Football Writers of America All-Rookie Team.

In 2017, Morse missed Weeks 3–7 with a foot injury before returning to the lineup the following week. He re-injured the foot in Week 14, and was placed on injured reserve on December 15, 2017.

=== Buffalo Bills ===
On March 13, 2019, Morse signed a four-year $44.5 million contract with the Buffalo Bills, making him the highest-paid center in the league at the time.

On March 14, 2022, Morse signed a two-year, $19.5 million contract extension with the Bills. That season, Morse received his first career Pro Bowl nomination.

On March 6, 2024, Morse was released after five seasons.

=== Jacksonville Jaguars ===
On March 13, 2024, Morse signed a two-year contract with the Jacksonville Jaguars.

On March 6, 2025, Morse announced his retirement from the NFL after ten seasons.
