= Louis Joseph Reicher =

His Excellency, The Most Reverend Louis Joseph Reicher
- Bishop of Austin
- Church: Roman Catholic Church
- See: Diocese of Austin
- In office: November 29, 1947 to November 15, 1971
- Successor: Vincent Madeley Harris

Orders
- Ordination: December 6, 1918 by Christopher Edward Byrne
- Consecration: April 14, 1948 by Christopher Edward Byrne

Personal details
- Born: June 14, 1890 Piqua, Ohio, US
- Died: February 23, 1984 (aged 93) Austin, Texas. US
- Education: St. James's College; Mount St. Mary's Seminary; St. Mary's Seminary

Louis Joseph Reicher (June 14, 1890 – February 23, 1984) was an American prelate of the Roman Catholic Church. He was the first bishop of the new Diocese of Austin in Texas from 1948 to 1971.

== Biography ==
=== Early life ===
Louis Reicher was born on June 14, 1890, in Piqua, Ohio, to Jacob and Marie (née Krebsbach) Reicher. He attended St. James's College in Waterloo, Ontario, from 1905 to 1911. After returning to Ohio, Reicher studied at Mount St. Mary's Seminary in Cincinnati, Ohio for a year before going to work for U.S. Steel. In 1916, he was accepted as a seminarian in the Diocese of Galveston and entered St. Mary's Seminary in La Porte, Texas.

=== Priesthood ===
Reicher was ordained to the priesthood for the Diocese of Galveston by Bishop Christopher Byrne on December 6, 1918. After his ordination, Reicher was appointed as chancellor of the diocese, a post he would hold until 1947. He also served as chaplain to the Dominican Sisters chapter in Galveston, Texas, vicar for the religious orders, a member of the Administrative Council, and founding pastor of St. Christopher's Parish in Houston from 1923 to 1941. The Vatican raised Reicher to the rank of domestic prelate in 1935 and a protonotary apostolic in 1940. Investing $3,000 saved from his career as a steelworker, Reicher eventually became a millionaire. He used his personal assets to help support the diocese financially during the Great Depression of the 1930s.

=== Bishop of Austin ===
On November 29, 1947, Reicher was appointed the first bishop of Austin by Pope Pius XII. He received his episcopal consecration at St. Mary's Cathedral in Galveston on April 14, 1948, from Bishop Christopher Byrne, with Bishops Joseph H. Albers and Mariano Garriga serving as co-consecrators. On May 13, 1948, he was installed by Archbishop Robert Lucey at St. Mary's Church in Austin; in attendance were former Governor Texas Dan Moody, Texas Governor Beauford H. Jester, and Austin Mayor Robert Miller.

During his tenure, Reicher built or restored over 200 churches and facilities, including a chancery office, Holy Cross Hospital in East Austin, Texas, Newman Centers on five college campuses, and six church-sponsored, low-rent housing projects. Between 1962 and 1965, Reicher attended the Second Vatican Council in Rome, where he contributed to the conciliar document on religious freedom, Dignitatis Humanae. He was a strong opponent of communism and supporter of the American Civil Rights Movement.

In 1964, Reicher transferred all of his wealth, approximately $5 million, to a trust fund providing direct assistance to the poor and sick along with low-interest loans to church institutions.

=== Retirement and legacy ===
On November 15, 1971, Pope Paul VI accepted Reicher's resignation as bishop of Austin. He retired to his ranch on Lake Austin, but suffered a stroke the next year.

In July 1973, the Sacred Congregation for Bishops and the Sacred Congregation for the Clergy in Rome ruled that the Reicher trust fund should be controlled by the diocese of Austin. Citing Texas law, the laypeople running the trust refused to surrender control. Reicher's successor as bishop, Vincent M. Harris, then filed suit against the trust. In the lawsuit, the diocese claimed that diocesan funds had gone into the trust fund. In response to the church position, Reicher made this statement:

Never were any funds of any diocese used in creating this trust . . . Let me assure you that I have not alienated any diocesan property.”

After two years of litigation, the two parties reached a settlement. Louis Reicher died at his home in Austin on February 23, 1984, at age 93.Reicher Catholic High School in Austin is named after him.

Catholic Church titles
Preceded by None	Bishop of Austin; 1948–1971	Succeeded by Vincent Madeley Harris
