= St. Michael's Catholic Academy (Travis County, Texas) =

St. Michael's Prep

Location
- 3000 Barton Creek Boulevard; Austin, Texas 78735; United States; 30.290555°N 97.875934°W

Information
- School type: Private
- Motto: Veritas Vincit (Truth Prevails)
- Religious affiliation: Catholic
- Patron saint: Saint Michael the Archangel
- Established: 1984
- CEEB code: 440313
- Dean: Evan Wiatrek
- Principal: Heidi Sloan
- Head of school: Collen Lynch, Ed.D.
- Chaplain: Lou Brusadi
- Grades: Pre-K–12
- Gender: Co-educational
- Average class size: 18
- Education system: Elementary, Middle, College preparatory
- Campus size: 50 acres (20 ha)
- Campus type: Suburban
- Colors: Maroon, white, and navy blue
- Athletics conference: TAPPS
- Sports: Baseball, basketball, cheer, cross country, dance, American football, golf, lacrosse, soccer, swimming, tennis, track and field, volleyball
- Mascot: The Warrior
- Team name: Warriors
- Rival: Regents
- Accreditation: SACS/AdvancEd and the Texas Catholic Conference
- Website: http://smcprep.org

St. Michael's Catholic Preparatory School (formerly St. Michael’s Catholic Academy) is a private college preparatory school in Barton Creek, a community in unincorporated Travis County, Texas (Greater Austin), with an enrollment of approximately 750 students in grades PreK-12. It is within the Roman Catholic Diocese of Austin. In 2023, it was merged with its sister school, St. Gabriel’s Catholic School, as one unified school. However, both schools still kept their own campuses. In 2024, both schools officially renamed to St. Michael's Catholic Preparatory School.

The student-teacher ratio is approximately 10 to 1, and the mean ACT Composite is 26.6. In 2015 and 2016, St. Michael's won the Class 4A Henderson Cup, awarded by the Texas Association of Private and Parochial Schools for excellence in academics, fine arts and athletics.

In 2016, St. Michael's won four state championships: academics, women's tennis, women's cross country and men's track and field. In athletics, St. Michael's has won more than 30 state championships. Many former St. Michael's student-athletes have played, or are now playing, Division 1 sports at the college level including American football, baseball, basketball, track and field, golf, volleyball, cross country, baseball and soccer.

== Background ==
The school was established in 1984 to fill the void left by the closing of the only Catholic high school in Austin in 1972. From 1972 to 1984, Austin was the only sizable city in the USA without a Catholic high school. A small group of parents and Catholic lay leaders commissioned a study that ultimately revealed enthusiasm in the Austin community for such a school. In 1984, St. Michael's Catholic Academy opened. It was one of the first Catholic schools in the USA established entirely by lay persons.

== Notable alumni ==
- Jameson Houston, NFL free agent defensive back
- Kyle Martin, 2009, former MLB pitcher for the Boston Red Sox
- Mitch Morse, 2010, NFL offensive lineman for the Buffalo Bills
- Amber Heard, actress (attended the school, but did not graduate)
