= Cathedral of the Sacred Heart (San Angelo, Texas) =

Cathedral Church of the Sacred Heart
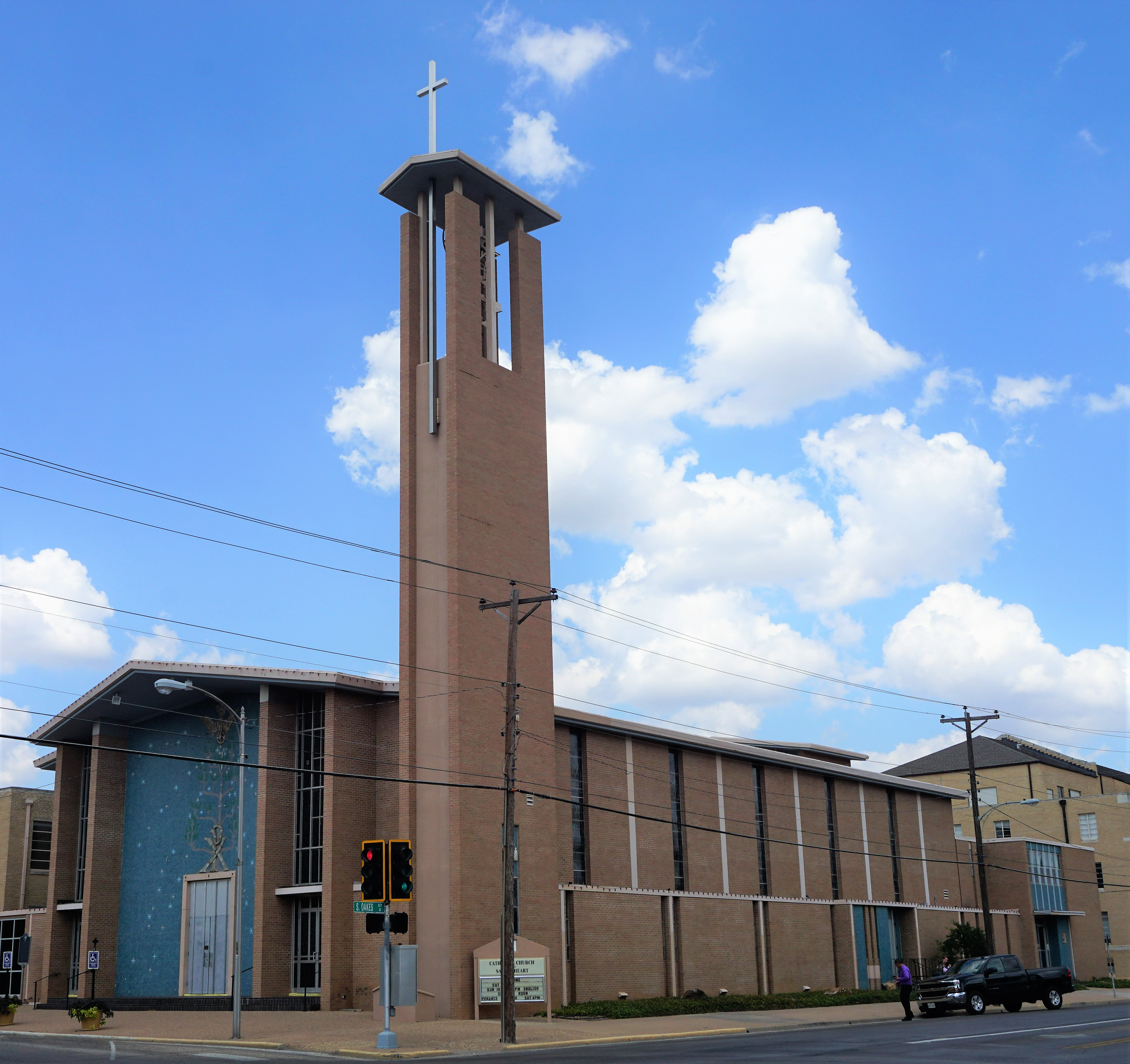

- Location in Texas
- 31°27′48″N 100°26′07″W
- Location: 20 E Beauregard Ave; San Angelo, Texas
- Country: United States
- Denomination: Roman Catholic Church
- Website: sanangelocathedral.org

History
- Former name: Sacred Heart Church
- Status: Cathedral Parish
- Founded: 1884
- Consecrated: December 21, 1964

Architecture
- Style: Modern

Specifications
- Materials: Brick

Administration
- Diocese: San Angelo

Clergy
- Bishop: Most Rev. Michael Sis
- Rector: Monsignor Larry Droll

The Cathedral Church of the Sacred Heart is a cathedral church located in San Angelo, Texas, United States. It is the seat of the Catholic Diocese of San Angelo. Sacred Heart Parish was founded in 1884, and it was named a cathedral in 1961. The present church was built in the Modern architectural style.

== History ==
Catholic priests had visited the area that is now San Angelo as early as the 17th century. Catholicism did not organize here until after Fort Concho was established in 1867. The Rev. Mathurin J. Pairier started visiting the area in 1874. He served the religious needs of Catholics at Fort Concho, Ben Ficklin, and Santa Angela. Bart J. DeWitt donated the land on which the cathedral now stands, known as "The Catholic Block," on September 22, 1874. Plans for a church were begun after the county seat was moved to San Angelo in 1882. The church, named Immaculate Conception, was completed two years later and Pairier was named the parish's first resident pastor. The stone church housed a diverse parish community of Mexican, English, Irish, and German Catholics.

The parish's second pastor, the Rev. John Sheehan, invited the Sisters of Charity of the Incarnate Word from San Antonio to start a parochial school. They did so in 1888. Part of the parish block was sold in 1906 during the pastorate of the Rev. Joseph Hoban when a new church building was under construction. It was this church that was named Sacred Heart.

The Diocese of San Angelo was established by Pope John XXIII in 1961. Sacred Heart was named the Cathedral Church at that time. It is the mother church for many Catholic parishes in West Texas.

== See also ==
- List of Catholic cathedrals in the United States
- List of cathedrals in the United States
