= Gregory Michael Aymond =

American Catholic prelate (born 1949)

His Excellency, The Most Reverend Gregory Michael Aymond
- Archbishop Emeritus of New Orleans
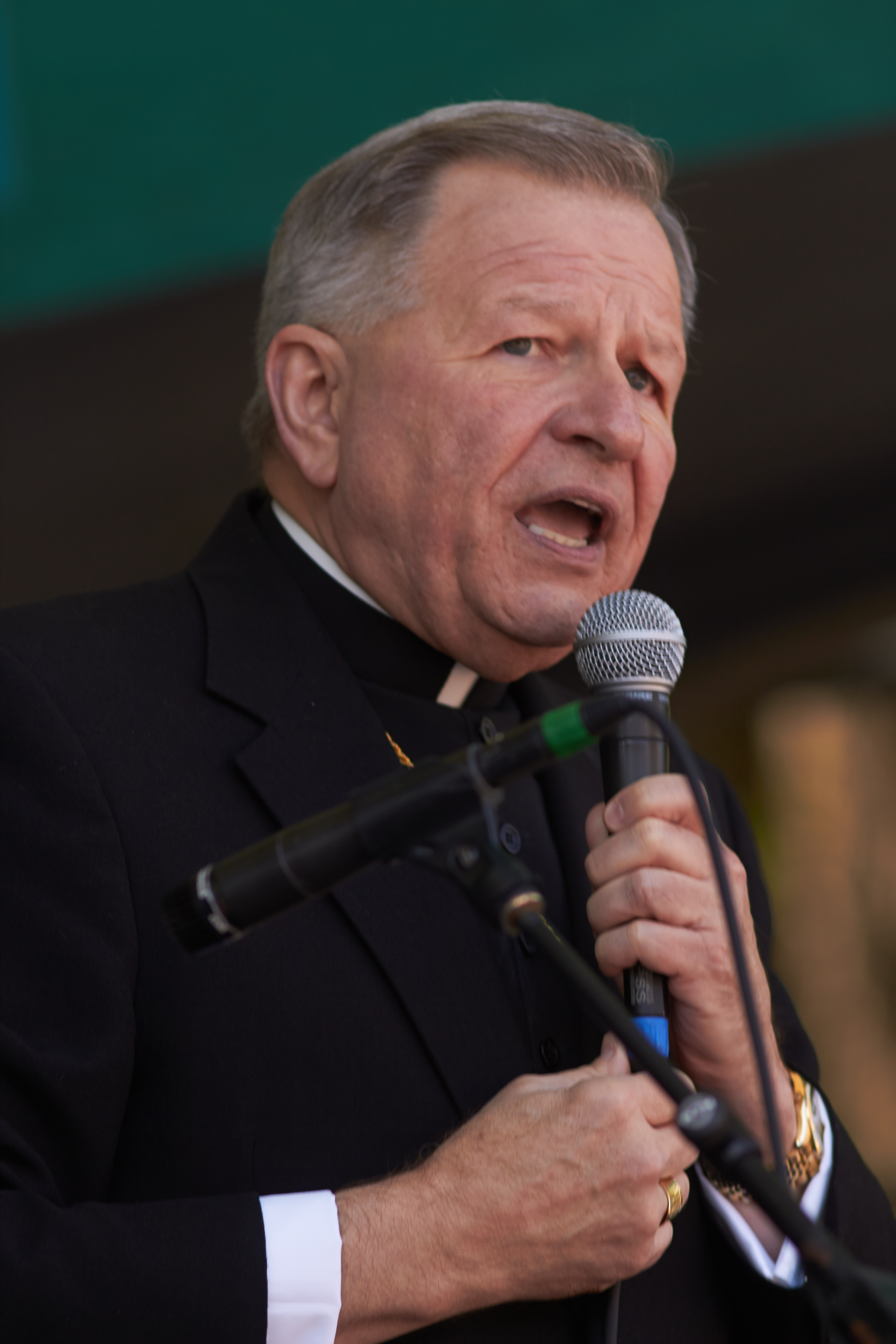
- Aymond in 2013
- Archdiocese: New Orleans
- Appointed: June 12, 2009
- Installed: August 20, 2009
- Retired: February 11, 2026
- Predecessor: Alfred Clifton Hughes
- Successor: James F. Checchio
- Previous posts: Bishop of Austin (2001–2009); Coadjutor Bishop of Austin (2000–2001); Auxiliary Bishop of New Orleans and Titular Bishop of Acholla (1996-2000)

Orders
- Ordination: May 10, 1975 by Philip Hannan
- Consecration: January 10, 1997 by Francis B. Schulte, Philip Hannan, and John Favalora

Personal details
- Born: November 12, 1949 (age 77) New Orleans, Louisiana, US
- Denomination: Catholic
- Education: Notre Dame Seminary; Loyola University New Orleans
- Motto: God is faithful
- Styles
- Reference style: His Excellency; The Most Reverend
- Spoken style: Your Excellency
- Religious style: Archbishop

Gregory Michael Aymond (born November 12, 1949) is an American Catholic prelate who served as the archbishop of New Orleans in Louisiana from 2009 to 2026.

Aymond was previously the bishop of Austin in Texas from 2001 to 2009 and coadjutor bishop from 2000 to 2001. He was an auxiliary bishop of New Orleans from 1997 to 2000.

== Life and career ==
=== Early life and education ===
The oldest of three children, Gregory Aymond was born on November 12, 1949, in the Gentilly neighborhood of New Orleans, Louisiana. He attended St. James Major Elementary School, and evacuated New Orleans with his family by skiff after Hurricane Betsy in 1965. After graduating from Cor Jesu High School in New Orleans in 1967, he studied at St. Joseph Seminary College in Saint Benedict, Louisiana, until 1971. He then attended Notre Dame Seminary in New Orleans, obtaining his Master of Divinity degree in 1975. He then furthered his studies at the Institute for Ministry at Loyola University New Orleans.

=== Priesthood ===
Aymond was ordained to the priesthood for the Archdiocese of New Orleans by Archbishop Philip Hannan on May 10, 1975. He then served as a professor and later rector at St. John Vianney Preparatory School in New Orleans. In 1981, Aymond was named as director of education and professor of pastoral theology and homiletics at Notre Dame Seminary. From 1986 to 2000, he served as president-rector of Notre Dame; his tenure was the longest in the seminary's history.

During his priestly ministry, he also served as executive director of the Department of Christian Formation, with responsibility for Catholic schools and religious education. He was director of Society for the Propagation of the Faith and was a member of its national board (1977–2000). During the 1980s, Aymond and other Notre Dame traveled to Mexico to build houses and provide religious training. In 1994 he founded Christ the Healer, a medical mission program of the Archdiocese of New Orleans in Granada, Nicaragua.

=== Auxiliary bishop of New Orleans ===
On November 19, 1996, Aymond was appointed auxiliary bishop of New Orleans and titular bishop of Acholla by Pope John Paul II. He received his episcopal consecration on January 10, 1997, from Archbishop Francis Schulte, with Archbishops Philip Hannan and John Favalora serving as co-consecrators.

==== Brian Matherne sex abuse case ====
As an auxiliary bishop of New Orleans, one of Aymond's duties included the oversight of Catholic schools in the archdiocese. In 1998, Aymond allowed Brian Matherne, a coach at Sacred Heart of Jesus School in Norco, Louisiana, to remain in his post for several months after receiving information from an alleged abuse victim's father that Matherne had molested his son 13 years earlier. He dropped the matter without alerting police after unsuccessful attempts to speak to the alleged victim, then 24 years old, who later told the St. Charles Parish Sheriff's Office about the matter.

Matherne was arrested and pled guilty to molesting 17 children over 15 years. He is serving a 30-year sentence in the Louisiana State Penitentiary. Aymond defended the church, but later stated he should have fired Matherne. In Austin three years later, Aymond began tightening the diocese's sex abuse policy, based partly on the Matherne case stating: "That painful experience – I will never forget it. It helped me to understand the complexity of pedophilia better."

=== Coadjutor bishop and Bishop of Austin ===
Coat of arms as bishop of Austin

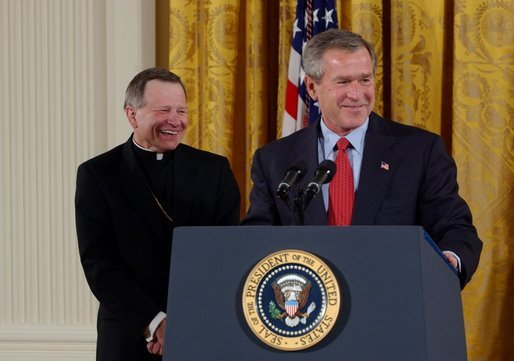
Aymond with US President George W. Bush (2004)

Aymond was named coadjutor bishop of Austin on June 2, 2000, by John Paul II; he was installed on August 3, 2000. He succeeded John E. McCarthy as the fourth bishop of Austin on January 2, 2001. The diocese grew rapidly (partly as a result of immigration) during Aymond's bishopric and actually had more churchgoers than many archdioceses, including New Orleans after Hurricane Katrina.

=== Archbishop of New Orleans ===
On June 12, 2009, Pope Benedict XVI named Aymond the 14th archbishop of New Orleans. He was installed on August 20, 2009, at the Saint Louis Cathedral. He continued, within the United States Conference of Catholic Bishops, to chair the Committee for the Protection of Children and Young People and sits on the Committees for Campus Ministry, Education, Laity, and World Missions. In a ceremony in 2009 at St. Peter's Basilica in Rome, Benedict XVI bestowed the pallium upon Aymond.

On February 11, 2026, Pope Leo XIV accepted his resignation with Coadjutor Archbishop James F. Checchio succeeding him.

Aymond has faced challenges in "the aftermath of years of sex scandals and the unpopular consolidation of parishes and closing of churches for economic reasons," as phrased by Kevin McGill of the Associated Press. Even so, he said, "Never in my wildest dreams did I think I would come back here as [arch]bishop." Shortly after his appointment as archbishop, the Survivors Network of those Abused by Priests issued a statement claiming he only "postures as someone who takes clergy sex crimes seriously".

Aymond's predecessor, Archbishop Alfred Hughes, implemented a controversial post-Hurricane Katrina church consolidation program that reduced the diocese from 142 parishes to 108. The storm drove away nearly a quarter of the archdiocese's former membership and left it with nearly $300 million in physical damage. Aymond has allowed several churches to re-open for special occasions. Under his bishopric, the number of seminarians increased threefold.

==== Introduction of the Roman Missal, third edition ====
Aymond, while serving as chair of the United States Conference of Catholic Bishops' (USCCB) Committee on Divine Worship, announced in June 2011, that beginning in September 2011, diocesan bishops could permit the gradual introduction of the musical settings of the people's parts of the Mass that are sung from the new translation of the Roman Missal. Primarily, this affected the Gloria, the Holy, Holy, Holy, and the different Memorial Acclamations. This variation to the implementation of the Roman Missal, third edition, was set to take place in November 2011. It was authorized by the conference's president, Archbishop Timothy Michael Dolan of New York.

== Opinions and attitudes ==
=== Leadership style ===
Bruce Nolan of the Times-Picayune describes Aymond as a "quiet pragmatist who prefers to promote Catholic values in and out of his church without the public confrontations some colleagues willingly accept." A June 16, 2009 editorial in the Times-Picayune praised as "a promising way to begin" Aymond's willingness to listen to his new flock.

Aymond has a reputation for taking on controversial issues in a direct and vocal way. He has called the confrontations a necessary part of being a bishop. "I don't feel I have a responsibility or an obligation to make people do what the church says", he said in 2008. "In fact, I think that would be wrong. But I do have an obligation to say, 'This is what the church's teaching is.'"

=== Abortion and contraception ===
Aymond was one of more than 80 American bishops who wrote to the University of Notre Dame in South Bend, Indiana, to protest its award of an honorary degree to President Barack Obama due to his support of abortion rights for women and embryonic stem cell research.

In October 2007, Aymond objected to the scheduled appearance of a dissident Catholic theologian, the Reverend Charles Curran, at St. Edward's University in South Austin, Texas. Curran is a priest whose Catholic theologian title was stripped by the Vatican because he openly condemned the church's teachings against abortion rights for women, artificial birth control, and human sexuality. St. Edward's ignored Aymond's directive and went ahead with the event.

=== Gay rights ===
Aymond believes that homosexuals should remain celibate.

In June 2013, Aymond issued a statement of regret that his predecessor, Archbishop Philip Hannan, and the local church leadership had ignored the 1973 arson attack on a gay bar in New Orleans that killed 32 people. Aymond wrote to Time magazine that

In retrospect, if we did not release a statement we should have to be in solidarity with the victims and their families ... The church does not condone violence and hatred. If we did not extend our care and condolences, I deeply apologize.

== Honors ==
Gregory Michael Aymond KC*HS is a knight commander with star and grand prior of the Southeastern Lieutenancy of the United States of America of the Order of the Holy Sepulchre.

== Books ==
- Aymond, Gregory Michael. Courageous Moral Leadership. Washington, DC: National Catholic Educational Association (NCEA), 2004. ISBN 1-55833-342-8, ISBN 978-1-55833-342-0.
- Sofield, Loughlan; Juliano, Carroll; & Aymond, Gregory Michael. Facing Forgiveness: A Catholic's Guide to Letting Go of Anger and Welcoming Reconciliation. Notre Dame, Indiana: Ave Maria Press, 2007. ISBN 1-59471-122-4, ISBN 978-1-59471-122-0.

== See also ==
- Catholic Church hierarchy
- Catholic Church in the United States
- Historical list of the Catholic bishops of the United States
- List of Catholic bishops of the United States
- Lists of patriarchs, archbishops, and bishops

Catholic Church titles
Preceded by Alfred Clifton Hughes	Archbishop of New Orleans; 2009–2026	Succeeded by James F. Checchio
Preceded by Alfred Clifton Hughes	Grand Prior Southeastern Lieutenancy of the Order of the Holy Sepulchre; 2009–present	Succeeded by Incumbent
Preceded by John Edward McCarthy	Bishop of Austin; 2001–2009	Succeeded by Joe S. Vásquez
