= John E. McCarthy =

American bishop (1930–2018)

His Excellency, The Most Reverend John Edward McCarthy
- Bishop of Austin
- Diocese: Diocese of Austin
- Appointed: December 19, 1985
- Installed: February 25, 1986
- Term ended: January 2, 2001
- Predecessor: Vincent Madeley Harris
- Successor: Gregory Michael Aymond
- Previous post: Auxiliary Bishop of Galveston-Houston (1979 to 1985)

Orders
- Ordination: May 26, 1956 by Wendelin Joseph Nold
- Consecration: March 14, 1979 by John Louis Morkovsky, Lawrence Michael De Falco, and Patrick Flores

Personal details
- Born: June 21, 1930 Houston, Texas, U.S.
- Died: August 18, 2018 (aged 88) Austin, Texas, U.S.
- Education: University of St. Thomas; St. Mary Seminary
- Motto: Lord I come to do your will

Styles of John Edward McCarthy
- Reference style: His Excellency; The Most Reverend
- Spoken style: Your Excellency
- Religious style: Bishop

John Edward McCarthy (June 21, 1930 – August 18, 2018) was an American prelate of the Roman Catholic Church.He served as bishop of the Diocese of Austin in Texas from 1985 to 2001. He previously served as an auxiliary bishop of the Diocese of Galveston-Houston in Texas from 1979 to 1985.

== Biography ==
=== Early life ===
John McCarthy was born on June 21, 1930, in Houston, Texas, to George McCarthy and Grace O'Brien McCarthy. The youngest of four children, he was just 18 months old when his father died.His mother struggled to support her family during the Great Depression of the 1930s.

McCarthy suffered an appendicitis at age five and nearly died. He had three abdominal surgeries the following year and was kept away from contact sports by his mother following doctor's advice. An avid learner, he picked up world geography and followed the progress of World War II armies at his mother's kitchen table. Although he fell behind in athletics, his brother, Frank, remembers, "in the classroom, he was untouchable, a straight-A student".

During the World War II, prices soared and the family faced greater difficulty than during the depression. He and his brothers took jobs to help. During his high school years, McCarthy worked in a downtown Houston petroleum statistics office, running a multi-lift printing press.He also started his own janitorial service which had three employees.

McCarthy attended primary school at All Saints School in Houston.He graduated from St. Thomas High School in Houston and earned a Bachelor of Arts degree in economics and sociology from the University of St. Thomas in Houston in 1956. He began his seminary training at St. Mary Seminary in Wickliffe, Ohio. He was awarded a Master of Theology degree from the University of St. Thomas in 1979.

=== Priesthood ===
McCarthy was ordained to the priesthood on May 25, 1956, for the Diocese of Galveston by Bishop Wendelin Joseph Nold. His first assignment was St. Pius Parish in Pasadena, Texas, where he initiated his first parish social ministry program. His next parish was St. Cecilia's in an affluent section of Houston.His third assignment was his home parish, All Saints. After several non-parish assignments in San Antonio and Washington, D.C., McCarthy returned to Houston to become pastor of St. Theresa's Parish. It was here that he developed his ideas for the parish social ministry model. This "Sisters in Social Services" program was adopted by Catholic Charities USA.

In 1966, McCarthy was appointed executive director of the Bishops' Committee for Spanish-speaking Catholics in San Antonio, Texas, where he focused on migrant farm workers. In 1966, McCarthy returned to Washington work with the U.S. Catholic Conference. He served as the director of the Social Action Department for one year and director of the Division for Poverty Programs for another year. He also helped found the Catholic Campaign for Human Development, which became the Catholic leadership's primary anti-poverty initiative, hammering out the initial concepts at a weekend retreat. Its mandate included voter registration, community-run schools, minority-owned and rural cooperatives, and job training programs.

In 1973, the bishops of Texas asked McCarthy to serve as the executive director of the Texas Catholic Conference (TCC), the public policy arm of the bishops.At that time, Texas had eleven dioceses and was the largest state conference in the nation. He enjoyed the diversity of the role, once contrasting the differences between El Paso and Beaumont, Texas. He led the TCC for seven years before being appointed auxiliary bishop.

=== Auxiliary Bishop of Galveston-Houston ===
On January 23, 1979, Pope John Paul II appointed McCarthy as an auxiliary bishop of what was now the Diocese of Galveston-Houston. He was consecrated at Ste. Therese Church in Houston on March 14, 1979, by Bishop John Morkovsky.

=== Bishop of Austin ===
On December 24, 1985, McCarthy was appointed by John Paul II as bishop of Austin. He was installed on February 26, 1986.

In 1987, McCarthy attended the National Black Catholic Congress. After returning to Austin, he established the Office of Black Catholics to focus on African American ministry within the diocese. McCarthy encouraged parishes to focus on their social advocacy and charity work. He also established missionary programs both abroad and at home. McCarthy established the diocesan Law Project, which recruited hundreds of attorneys and interpreters to volunteer legal services for the needy.

McCarthy issued two pastoral letters to parishioners in his diocese. His 1992 letter asked Catholics to practice compassion for people living with HIV/AIDS. His 1993 letter cited the "tragic collapse of standards of decency, morality and honesty in TV, movie and popular music products. It urged Catholics to question themselves, what values were being instilled by the popular media.

=== Retirement and legacy ===
Pope John Paul II accepted McCarthy's letter of resignation as bishop of Austin on Jan 2, 2001. After his retirement Jan. 2, 2001, McCarthy wrote a blog and had numerous hobbies. In 2013, he published a collection of his blog writings in a book, "Off the Cuff and Over the Collar: Common Sense Catholicism". John McCarthy died at his Austin home on August 18, 2018, at age 88.

At the time of his death, McCarthy was a member of St. Teresa's Parish of Austin. His burial mass was held at St. William Catholic Church in Round Rock, Texas, and attended by 1,200 people. Pat Hayes of Seton Healthcare Network and St. Edward's University in Austin, summarized McCarthy's philosophy; "He believed, that together we could advance justice for the common good."

A 2019 report by KXAN in Austin revealed that in 1994 McCarthy transferred a priest accused of sexual abuse crimes to another parish. The report cited documents from a 2003 lawsuit that indicated McCarthy was fully aware of multiple allegations against Reverend James O’Connor, a diocesan priest. In a 1994 letter, to O'Connor, McCarthy said that he was appointing him as administrator of St. Thomas Parish in Hamilton, Texas, despite many misgivings:

“I am not comfortable placing you in charge of a parish, even a small one, but in order to give you a base for a few months while you rethink your situation, I am happy to go against my better judgment on the basis of Christian charity.

== Viewpoints ==
=== Abortion ===
McCarthy permitted the local city hospital run by Catholic-affiliated Seton hospital, to perform tubal ligations. This conflicted with church law on birth control and at the behest of the Vatican this was discontinued.

=== Death penalty ===
McCarthy made the case to abolish the death penalty years before DNA testing was available to prove innocence. He was known to pressure decision makers at the Texas State Capitol over the issue.

=== LGBTQ rights ===
When the National Conference of Catholic Bishops committee released a statement calling for Catholic parents to embrace their gay and lesbian children, McCarthy praised their action. He used his influence with the Texas Legislature and individual Catholic lawmakers to reform the criminal justice system.

=== Parish social ministry model ===
McCarthy believed that the purpose of a parish is to "make Jesus present". He broke that down into three areas; worship, teaching and lessening pain. Although every parish had organized programs on worship and education, his concern was they did not always have any structures to address local social needs. He created the first organized parish social ministries. Its goal was for every parish to establish a program for social concerns.

As a young pastor at St. Pius Parish in Houston in 1969, McCarthy began implementing this model of social ministry, articulating how social services should be delivered. His model was based on parishes developing their own programs to meet the needs of those living within parish boundaries. While pastor of St. Theresa's he continued to develop the parish social ministry model.His parish social ministry model spread throughout the diocese. Eventually this "Sisters in Social Services" model was adopted by Catholic Charities USA.

=== Priesthood ===
McCarthy recognized the centrality of the priesthood as the organizing tool of the church. He said the priest makes the sacraments possible, which make Jesus Christ present. Since he wanted to build new, smaller communities, it would require more priests. To that end he wrote letters to his fellow bishops and to the Vatican on the issue of priestly celibacy.He urged them to respond to what he saw as a looming crisis and consider optional celibacy, suggesting allowing priests to marry. In a 2013 interview, McCarthy said "It might mean woman priests." He suggested that even if a priest couldn't be available full-time, perhaps a nun could act as pastor to a smaller parish.

=== Race ===
Self described as "slightly tilted toward the left", McCarthy was known for his efforts supporting civil rights, helping workers and increasing minority inclusion in the Catholic church. As a young priest, McCarthy took part in protests to advance civil rights for African-Americans and other people. "He marched in Selma," said Luci Baines Johnson, daughter of US President Lyndon B. Johnson, referring to the 1965 Selma to Montgomery marches of the American Civil Rights Movement. She also stated; "So the Great Society programs my father had in civil rights, these are the causes that were dear to the heart of a young priest." McCarthy supported the United Farm Workers movement led by Cesar Chavez.

== See also ==
- Catholic Church hierarchy
- Catholic Church in the United States
- Historical list of the Catholic bishops of the United States
- List of Catholic bishops of the United States
- Lists of patriarchs, archbishops, and bishops

Catholic Church titles
Preceded by Vincent Madeley Harris	Bishop of Austin; 1985–2001	Succeeded by Gregory Michael Aymond
Preceded by –	Auxiliary Bishop of Galveston-Houston; 1979–1985	Succeeded by –
