= 2017 Facebook live streaming incident =

2017 Facebook live streaming incident may refer to:

- 2017 Uppsala rape
- 2017 Chicago torture incident

== See also ==
- Livestreamed crime
- Killing of Robert Godwin, a 2017 case in which a video of the crime was posted online (but not live streamed) by the perpetrator
