= In Limbo (2021 film) =

- Directed by: Aleksandr Khant
- Written by: Aleksandr Khant; Vladislav Malakhov
- Produced by: Ruben Dishdishyan; Maxim Dobromyslov; Aleksandr Khant
- Starring: Igor Ivanov; Zhenya Vinogradova; Olga Sakhanova; Zhanna Pugachyova; Konstantin Gatsalov
- Cinematography: Natalya Makarova
- Edited by: Katya Truba
- Production companies: Perevorot Film Company; 1147 Productions
- Distributed by: Central Partnership
- Release dates: October 2021 (Warsaw Film Festival); June 23, 2022 (Russia)
- Running time: 108 min.
- Country: Russia
- Language: Russian

In Limbo (Russian: Межсезонье, romanized: Mezhsezonye) is a 2021 Russian crime drama film directed by Aleksandr Khant. This film was theatrically released on June 23, 2022.

The film is based on real events and the incident that occurred in the village of Strugi Krasnye in the Pskov region, Russia with 15-year-old Denis Muravyov and Katerina Vlasova on November 14, 2016.

== Plot ==
The film is about a young couple who run away from home and decide to take on the cruel adult world, unaware that their innocent prank will turn into a real crime.

== Cast ==
- Igor Ivanov as Sasha Makarova
- Zhenya Vinogradova as Danila Krasnov
- Olga Sakhanova as Irina
- Zhanna Pugachyova as Snezhana
- Konstantin Gatsalov as Viktor
- Vladimir Spartak as Dyryavyy
- Ilya Mozgovoy as cyclist
- Konstantin Itunin as Viktor's assistant
- Irina Cherichenko as Olga Romanova
- Denis Kurlayev as police officer

== Critical response ==
In Limbo was awarded the Youth Jury Prize at the Warsaw Film Festival.

Film critic Yulia Shagelman gave the film a negative review. She opined that "the awkward remarks of teenagers in phone videos at the beginning of the film ultimately prove to be far more accurate and honest than the subsequent hundred minutes". Valery Kichin, on the contrary, praised the film, particularly noting the performances of the leading actors, as well as Hunt's characterization.

== See also ==
- Pskov standoff and double suicide
