= Robert Goodwin =

Robert Goodwin may refer to:

- Robert Goodwin (Parliamentarian) (c. 1601–1681), English politician who sat in the House of Commons at various times between 1626 and 1659
- Robert K. Goodwin (1905–1983), Republican U.S. Representative, 1940–1941
- Robert Kerr Goodwin (born 1948), American non-profit executive and publisher
- R. W. Goodwin, American television producer and director best known for The X-Files
- Booth Goodwin (Robert Booth Goodwin II, born 1971), United States Attorney for the Southern District of West Virginia
- Robert Goodwin (wrestler) (born 1981), American professional wrestler
- Robert Godwin, man who was shot and killed in a killing streamed to Facebook in April 2017, see Killing of Robert Godwin

== See also ==
- Robert Godwin (disambiguation)
