= Livestreamed crime =

Crime that is livestreamed on the internet

Livestreamed crime is a phenomenon in which criminal acts are publicly livestreamed on social media platforms such as Twitch or Facebook Live.

Due to the fact that livestreams are accessible instantaneously, it is difficult to quickly detect and moderate violent content, and almost impossible to protect the privacy of victims or bystanders. Livestreaming crime allows anyone from the public to become a distant witness.

"Trash streaming" is a YouTube subculture in which livestreamers solicit donations in exchange for carrying out dares on-stream, which are often abusive or criminal.

== History ==
In April 2016, Marina Lonina, age 18; and Raymond Gates, age 29, were arrested in Ohio, US, on charges that Gates raped an underage friend of Lonina's while Lonina live streamed the crime on Periscope. The prosecutor pointed out that Lonina, who was taken advantage of by a much older man, had become "caught up" in her excitement over the number of "likes" she was getting, and is shown on screen "laughing and giggling". Joss Wright of the Oxford Internet Institute pointed out that, given the "volume of content being created and uploaded every day, [there] is almost no practical way to prevent content like this being uploaded and shared".

By May, The New York Times was including the Periscope rape as one of a series of recent cases in which crimes were live streamed. These included one in which a young woman in Égly, France, spoke via Periscope about her distress and suicidal thoughts and was apparently encouraged by viewers to kill herself, which she did by throwing herself under a train. Also included was the case of two teenagers who live streamed themselves bragging and laughing as they beat up a drunken man in a bar in Bordeaux, France.

== Types ==
=== Cybercrimes ===
Cybersex trafficking, also referred to as live streaming sexual abuse, involves sex trafficking and the live streaming of coerced sexual abuse or rape. Victims are abducted, threatened, or deceived and transferred to "cybersex dens". The dens can be in any location where the cybersex traffickers have a computer, tablet, or phone with Internet connection. Perpetrators use social media networks, videoconferencing, pornographic video sharing websites, dating pages, chat rooms, apps, dark web sites, and other online platforms. Online payment systems and cryptocurrencies are often used for anonymity. Millions of reports of cybersex trafficking are sent to authorities annually. Local authorities in Cambodia have expressed concern that new laws and police procedures are necessary to combat this type of cybercrime.

=== War crimes ===
A war crime is the act of breaking the laws of war. Through combination of the fact that war crime data suffers from considerable underreporting, general technological innovation which has made video recording and streaming easier, and coincidental occurrence of the Arab Spring and Russo-Ukrainian war, there have been more instances of people or groups live-streaming such acts to instill fear into the public. Content is most commonly disseminated through social media, with examples including the Terrorgram phenomena, White jihad, and the Islamic State's media wing Al-Hayat Media Center.

== Instances ==
=== 2008 ===
- 8 June: A bystander livestreamed the Akihabara massacre on Ustream, attracting an audience of 2,000 viewers. Another user also used Ustream to livestream the massacre's aftermath, including police and public response.

=== 2015 ===
- 12 July: Two West Weber, Utah teenagers were arrested after filming themselves stealing ice cream from a truck while livestreaming on Periscope.

=== 2016 ===
- 14 June: 27-year-old Antonio Perkins was fatally shot while streaming on Facebook Live in Chicago's North Lawndale neighborhood.
- 1 August: Korryn Gaines of Randallstown, Maryland livestreamed her actions on Facebook and Instagram as she resisted arrest and started an armed standoff with the police, which ended with Gaines being fatally shot and her five-year-old son sustaining injuries to his face and arm after being hit by stray bullets.
- 8 November: A Jackson, Michigan man livestreamed himself breaking into a home and shooting a woman on Facebook Live.
- 14 November: Two 15-year-old teenagers Denis Muravyov and Katerina Vlasova from Pskov, Russia, barricaded themselves in a private house in Strugi Krasnye in the afternoon, broadcast live on Periscope and opened fire on police officers before dying of suicide.

=== 2017 ===
- 1 January: A Reynoldsburg, Ohio woman livestreamed herself taping her toddler to a wall on Facebook Live. She later uploaded a video taunting viewers who had called child protective services on her.
- 3 January: A torture incident in Chicago, in which an 18-year-old intellectually disabled male was filmed being physically and verbally abused by four individuals (two men and two women), was livestreamed by one of the women on Facebook and sparked massive controversy.
- 21 January: In Uppsala, Sweden, two Afghan immigrants and one Swedish citizen livestreamed the gang rape of a woman on Facebook.
- 10 April: A Los Angeles man shot at passing cars and police officers while livestreaming on Facebook Live.
- 24 April: A Phuket man livestreamed himself killing his newborn daughter on Facebook. He soon after committed suicide.

=== 2018 ===
- 22 February: A Middletown, Connecticut man livestreamed himself on Facebook Live as he drove through the front doors of a hospital, before setting himself on fire. The man was treated for burn injuries and arrested.
- 4 April: A Detroit teenager accidentally shot his friend while playing with a gun on Instagram Live.
- 26 August: David Katz shot 12 people during a video game tournament, killing two. The shooting was livestreamed by the event's Twitch stream.
- 10 December: An Australian man struck his girlfriend after a livestreamed altercation that ensued while the man was playing Fortnite. The man pleaded guilty to assault.

=== 2019 ===
- 15 March: Two mass shootings occurred at the Al Noor Mosque and the Linwood Islamic Centre in Christchurch, New Zealand, where 51 people were killed and 40 were injured by 28-year-old Brenton Tarrant from Australia. The first attack was livestreamed by the shooter on Facebook Live for 17 minutes; they were described by then-Prime Minister Jacinda Ardern as "one of the darkest days in New Zealand history". Following the shootings, Facebook announced restrictions on Facebook Live on those who posted violent extremist material.
- 22 March: Vlad Cristian Eremia, 26, stabbed a 77-year-old Catholic priest, Father Claude Grou, in Saint Joseph's Oratory in Montreal, Quebec, Canada; the attack was captured on a livestream by Salt + Light Television.
- 9 October: Stephan Balliet committed a shooting near a synagogue and kebab restaurant in Halle, Saxony-Anhalt, Germany, resulting in two dead and two others injured; the attack was livestreamed on Twitch.
- 29 December: Keith Thomas Kinnunen opened fire at the West Freeway Church of Christ in White Settlement, Texas, US, fatally shooting two people before he was shot and killed by an armed member of the congregation. The shooting was livestreamed on YouTube because the church livestreamed its services.

=== 2020 ===
- 8 February: Thai Army Sergeant Major Jakrapanth Thomma killed 29 and wounded 57 people in a mass shooting in Thailand. A portion of the shooting at the Terminal 21 Korat mall was livestreamed by the perpetrator on Facebook Live.
- 20 May: Armando "Junior" Hernandez, a 20-year-old livestreamed his attack at the Westgate Entertainment District in Glendale, Arizona, US where three people were wounded, on Snapchat.
- 26 May: A man in Stamford, Connecticut livestreamed himself on Instagram on a highway overpass saying he thought people were following him. He then began to fire on passing vehicles on the road below.
- 15 July: A Tallahassee, Florida teen was murdered while livestreaming on Instagram in a church parking lot.
- 8 November: A Las Vegas man killed his girlfriend at her home while live on Facebook. Shortly before the livestream, the man also killed the woman's grandfather.

=== 2021 ===
- 6 January: Far-right personality Anthime Gionet, better known as "Baked Alaska", took part in the storming of the U.S. Capitol and livestreamed the event on DLive.
- 22 March: Ahmad Al Aliwi Al-Issa, age 21, shot and killed ten people in a mass shooting in Boulder, Colorado, US. A portion of the shooting at a King Soopers supermarket was livestreamed on YouTube by a bystander.
- 10 April: A Singapore student abroad in London was attacked with a knife during a robbery streamed by a bystander on YouTube.
- 29 April: A Prichard, Alabama man livestreamed himself abusing his wife on Facebook Live.
- 7 June: A Rochester, New York woman threatened to shoot a man and a woman over the course of four livestreams done on Facebook Live.
- 8 July: Hawthorne, California Rapper Zerali Dijon Rivera, age 21, also known as Indian Red Boy, was shot and killed while on Instagram Live.
- 19 August: 15-year-old boy named Hugo Jackson livestreamed himself via Twitch stabbing a faculty member at his secondary school in Eslöv, Sweden. The attacker used a head-mounted camera on a helmet to livestream the attack and wore body armour similar to Brenton Tarrant, whom he had quoted in his manifesto.
- 20 August: 19-year-old Aidan Ingalls shot a man to death and critically injured his wife on the South Haven Pier before turning the gun on himself halfway down. The entire shooting lasted around a minute and was captured on WWMT's beach camera, which was being livestreamed on YouTube.
- 25 September: After threatening to kill somebody on a separate video, a 27-year-old Orlando, Florida man placed his phone against a trash can and livestreamed himself on Facebook attacking two police officers with a brick.
- 23 October: In 's-Hertogenbosch, Netherlands, 21-year-old Bouchra killed her half-sister Anouk using a knife and livestreamed it via Instagram. The 2026 documentary De Instagram Moord by John van den Heuvel is about this murder.

=== 2022 ===
- 15 January: Malik Faisal Akram took multiple people hostage at Congregation Beth Israel, a Jewish synagogue in Colleyville, Texas, United States. A portion of the hostage-taking was livestreamed on the synagogue's Facebook account.
- 18 April: A Baton Rouge, Louisiana man fatally stabbed a woman while she was on Facebook Live.
- 14 May: Payton Gendron killed 10 people and injured three others while livestreaming the shooting on Twitch, inside and in the parking lot of the Tops Friendly Markets in Buffalo, New York, US. 11 of the 13 people shot were black.
- 15 June: A West Baton Rouge Parish, Louisiana reserve deputy filmed himself on Facebook firing at a fleeing vehicle as he and a full-time deputy investigated a vehicle theft. The reserve deputy was fired and later charged with illegal discharge of a weapon.
- 28 June: An Ypsilanti, Michigan man was shot and killed on Facebook Live due to a purported argument.
- 24 July: Brooklyn-based pastor Lamor Whitehead and his wife were robbed of more than $1,000,000 worth of jewelry during a livestreamed church service.
- 7 September: During a shooting spree in Memphis, Tennessee, Ezekiel Kelly, a 19-year-old man, livestreamed himself on Facebook Live entering an AutoZone store and critically wounding an employee.
- 4 December: A food blogger and influencer named Gan Soujiong, also known as "Fatty Goes To Africa" online, was attacked and stabbed to death while livestreaming by Feng Zhengyung, allegedly a rival influencer in the Indra Chowk market in Kathmandu, Nepal.
- 22 December: A Handsworth, West Midlands man stabbed three people, killing one, in a "drink and drug-fuelled rampage" on Facebook Live.

=== 2023 ===
- 25 March: A Columbus, Mississippi woman fatally shot a man in a domestic violence incident on Facebook Live.
- 26 March: At a Starbucks in Vancouver, British Columbia, 37-year-old Paul Schmidt was fatally stabbed by Inderdeep Singh Gosal after requesting him not to vape around his young daughter. Bystander Alex Bodger livestreamed and commentated to TikTok Schmidt bleeding to death without offering any assistance.
- 10 April: 25-year-old Connor James Sturgeon livestreamed on Instagram as he opened fire at a bank he previously worked at in Louisville, Kentucky, killing five and wounding eight before being fatally shot by police.
- 25 April: Two women in Holmes County, Mississippi were fatally shot on Facebook Live after a fight.
- 27 April: A Minneapolis man barricaded himself for several hours in a standoff with the FBI before being fatally shot, all while livestreaming on Facebook Live.
- 23 May: Two men were attacked with a knife while livestreaming on Douyin in Xiamen, China.
- 7 June: A Shreveport, Louisiana woman "fired wildly" during an argument on a Facebook Live broadcast.
- 16 June: A Doda, Jammu and Kashmir man murdered a relative with an axe during a Facebook Live broadcast.
- 23 July: After murdering his ex-girlfriend and her sister, a Tallahassee, Florida man streamed his suicide on Facebook Live.
- August: An Oklahoma teenager was accidentally shot in the face by another teenager.
- 11 August: A Gradačac man shot and killed his ex-wife and two other people live on Instagram. He also wounded a police officer and two others before killing himself.
- 7 October: During the 2023 Hamas-led attack on Israel, Hamas fighters livestreamed the attack through Facebook Live, sometimes from phones stolen from Israelis.
- 9 October: An 18-year-old Hebron man livestreamed on Facebook as he attempted to attack Israeli soldiers with a construction vehicle.
- 20 October: Two San Antonio teenagers accused of a fatal drive-by shooting livestreamed a car chase and their subsequent arrest on Instagram Live.
- 22 October: A San Antonio man shot at a dog during a livestream.
- 29 October: A shooting during Halloween festivities at Ybor City, a neighborhood in Tampa, which resulted in two dead was livestreamed on Instagram Live by victims.
- 5 November: A Calamba, Misamis Occidental radio host was shot and killed during a Facebook Live broadcast.
- 12 December: A group of friends in a Miami-Dade County rental were livestreaming when their house was shot at in a drive-by shooting, wounding a woman.
- 12 December: An Uber driver in Mexico was shot dead during a struggle while driving and streaming on TikTok.
- 15 December: 54-year-old Serhiy Batryn detonated three grenades during a meeting at Keretsky town hall, killing one and wounding 26. The meeting was being livestreamed at the time of the attack.
- 19 December: A Doncaster man stabbed and wounded a person on Facebook Live.

=== 2024 ===
- 2 January: A Waukesha, Wisconsin man engaged in a shootout with police on Facebook Live following a domestic violence call.
- 4 January: Student Dylan Butler livestreamed a mass shooting at his high school in Perry, Iowa, killing two people and injuring six others before committing suicide.
- 8 January: A San Rafael, California woman stabbed her mother to death on Facebook Live.
- 8 February: Indian politician Mauris Noronha shot and killed his rival Abhishek Ghosalkaron on Facebook Live before killing himself.
- 12 February: Taiwanese YouTuber Goodnight Chicken livestreamed himself being abducted in Sihanoukville, Cambodia. He was soon arrested after it was discovered that he staged the kidnapping for content for his channel. He was found guilty of "incitement to cause chaos to social security", and was sentenced to two years in prison along with a fellow content creator who helped him.
- 13 April: A man livestreamed himself as he fired several shots from a rifle while on the roof of a Marina del Rey, California apartment building.
- 29 April: A 22-year-old Decatur, Illinois woman struck, bit, and stabbed a woman on Facebook Live. She was charged with aggravated battery.
- 9 May: A Korean YouTuber fatally stabbed another YouTuber on a livestream.
- 23 May: A Fort Wayne, Indiana man fired several shots at a random person inside a Kroger supermarket while on Facebook Live.
- 31 May: The 2024 Mannheim stabbing, in which an Islamic extremist stabbed a police officer to death and wounded five other people during an anti-Islam rally, was captured on a YouTube livestream.
- 7 June: As he disputed with homeless people in downtown Spokane, Washington, a livestreaming YouTuber shot and wounded a man. The YouTuber was sentenced to three years in prison.
- 26 June: 19-year-old Australian Jordan Patten livestreamed himself attempting to commit a mass stabbing in Newcastle, New South Wales, but eventually gave up. No one was injured.
- 12 August: 18-year-old Arda Küçükyetim livestreamed himself stabbing and injuring five people outside a mosque in Eskişehir, Turkey.
- 2 September: A University of the West Indies student was killed and another man wounded on a TikTok livestream.
- 5 November: A man assaulted an Arizona Department of Child Safety employee at an agency office in Mesa, livestreaming himself on Facebook placing the employee in a chokehold. The attacker was arrested and charged with attempted first-degree murder.
- 5 November: A Florida woman livestreamed the murder of a 34-year-old woman in Sanford. The woman streamed her girlfriend, 35-year-old Savon Chantay Tyler, bringing a gun and baseball bat to the victim's apartment before a physical altercation ensued and Tyler shot the victim.
- 30 November: A 17-year-old student livestreamed a hammer attack on two classmates at a school in Guadalajara, Jalisco, Mexico.
- 7 December: A Jamaican TikToker was shot to death on a livestream in Saint Catherine Parish.

=== 2025 ===
- 22 January: A 17-year-old student at Antioch High School in Nashville, Tennessee partially live-streamed a shooting on Kick, killing one student and injuring another before killing himself.
- 29 January: Salwan Momika, an Iraqi-Swedish Atheist and critic of Islam known for burning the Quran in public, was shot and killed on a TikTok live stream at his home in Södertälje.
- 3 February: A 38-year-old Dundalk man livestreamed for three hours while perpetrating an assault. The perpetrator used the victim's cellphone to livestream the crime.
- 2 March: Twitch streamers Valkyrae, Emiru, and Cinna were stalked by a man while livestreaming their visit to Pacific Park on the Santa Monica Pier. After they denied giving him their phone numbers, he attempted to physically assault the women and verbally threatened to kill them.
- 11 March: 22-year-old Japanese female streamer Airi Sato was stabbed to death in Tokyo, Japan, while live-streaming herself walking through the streets on the WhoWatch livestreaming app. The woman suffered multiple stab wounds to her head, neck and abdomen. She was found unconscious at the scene and was rushed to a nearby hospital, where she was pronounced dead. The attacker, 42-year-old Kenji Takano, had calmly carried out the assault and was later apprehended at the scene by police officers.
- 15 March: A gunman opened fire at a pool tournament in Bogotá, Colombia, killing two people and wounding four others. The shooting was captured on a livestream.
- 19 April: A 42-year-old Greek man was shot and killed in Kallithea while streaming on Facebook Live.
- 28 April: A 25-year-old Jamaican was shot and killed by a gunman in Red Hills while livestreaming on TikTok.
- 11 May: Four people were killed, including politician Yesenia Lara Gutiérrez, and three others were wounded in a mass shooting at a campaign march in Texistepec, Mexico. Gunfire was captured on a Facebook livestream.
- 13 May: A 23-year-old Mexican beauty influencer was killed in a targeted shooting in Zapopan while livestreaming on TikTok.
- 20 May: A 16-year-old student was arrested after livestreaming himself wounding three female classmates with a knife at a school in Pirkkala, Finland.
- 8 June: A 44-year-old YouTuber and his 43-year-old wife were shot and killed as he livestreamed on the Las Vegas Strip near the Bellagio Fountains. A 41-year-old man, another YouTuber who reportedly had a feud with the victims, was charged with murder.
- 24 June: Gabriel Jesús Sarmiento, a 25-year-old Venezuelan influencer on TikTok, was shot dead during a livestream in the city of Maracay.
- 14 July: A Bronx rapper was fatally shot by two people; the killing was live streamed on a cellphone.
- 3 August: A mob of about 15 men targeted a taco truck, Tacos Los Poblanos, for robbery and assault at midnight somewhere between Avalon Boulevard and Slauson Avenue, Los Angeles. Six people were injured. Customers told the owners of the taco truck that it was livestreamed by the perpetrators as the crime was unfolding.
- 15 August: A Chicagoan was killed after talking to a close friend outside the liquor store, while he was livestreaming. The perpetrator followed the victim as he was walking to his car.
- 18 August: Raphaël Graven, known by his online alias Jean Pormanove, died on livestream at Kick after being abused and humiliated for more than 280 hours nonstop by fellow associates.
- 19 August: An 18-year-old Newark man stabbed and seriously injured a worker from an Afghan restaurant while livestreaming the attack on Discord.
- 25 August: Raja Jackson, son of Quinton Jackson assaulted Stuart Smith, also known as Syko Stu. Raja knocked Smith unconscious during an incident where Raja slammed Smith and proceeded to punch him a total of 22 times, 18 of which were to his head, at a KnokX Pro Wrestling event.
- 10 September: Ashur Sarnaya, a 45-year-old disabled Assyrian Christian from Iraq, was stabbed to death in Lyon, France while doing a livestream on TikTok about Christianity.
- 24 September: Two women, cousins 20-year-olds Morena Verri and Brenda del Castillo, and a girl, 15-year-old Lara Gutiérrez were tortured and murdered while it was livestreamed through a private social media group to around 45 people.
- 25 September: Floridian Shaniece Willingham was livestreaming on Instagram when she attempted filicide and suicide on her three children by tying them to herself and to jump in the pool to kill them. When she saw a white SUV van nearby approaching, she proceeded with the attempt and tried to drown herself with her children but a witness rescued all of them.
- 27 September: A Ukrainian YouTuber with more than 6.5 million subscribers was arrested in Japan for trespassing the Fukushima exclusion zone which was declared a no-go zone after the Fukushima nuclear disaster. Two other Ukrainians were arrested in the town of Okuma, Fukushima after entering an unoccupied house on Wednesday morning in September 24.
- 17 October: Twitch streamer Emiru was sexually harassed by a man during a live broadcast while doing a meet-and-greet at TwitchCon San Diego in San Diego, California.
- 25 November: Oscar Bucol Jr., the Barangay Captain of Tres de Mayo, Digos, Davao del Sur was shot dead while speaking to a local resident who lost his wallet while being recorded in Facebook Live.
- 28 November: Blogger Subkhan Mamedov was hosting a livestream from his apartment in Dubai. Athlete Shovkhal Churchaev was next to him. After Mamedov made jokes about Churchaev, Churchaev attacked and beat him.
- 16 December: Timofey Kulyamov, a 15-year-old student, livestreamed a mass stabbing at the Uspenskaya Secondary School in Odintsovo, Russia, via Telegram, killing one person and injuring three others.

=== 2026 ===
- 16 February: The 2026 Pawtucket shooting was caught on a livestream of a hockey game.
- 25 March: A 13-year-old student in Italy attacked and injured his French teacher while live-streaming on Telegram. When confronted, he fled and was later arrested.
- 18 May: Two teenage gunmen, identified as Cain Clark and Caleb Vazquez, fatally shot three people outside the Islamic Center of San Diego before dying from self-inflicted gunshot wounds. They livestreamed the attack; during the stream, Clark shot Vazquez twice before turning the weapon on himself. On August 31, a 17-year-old female was indicted by a North Carolina grand jury for agreeing, prior to the shooting, to record the livestream and publish it online, which she allegedly did.
- 29 May: An 11-year-old boy in Italy tried to stab a teacher while streaming his attack on Telegram.
- 26 July: A food vendor who was hosting a livestream at the Bite of Seattle festival captured the beginning of the mass shooting.
- 4 August: On the evening in Culiacán, Mexico, a social media influencer César Gastélum was fatally shot during a livestream.
- 15 August: The 2026 Lexington shooting was caught on a livestream.
- 18 August: A Grade 9 student gunman, later identified as Mohammed Mael Jalani, live streamed the 2026 Zamboanga City School Shooting, which also recorded the death of Patrick Dylan Wee, a Grade 10 student and one of the two confirmed fatalities including the perpetrator.
- 20 August: In Vellmar, Germany, a 22-year-old social media influencer was arrested after an off-duty police officer recognized his location in a livestream showing him riding a heavily modified e-scooter at up to 100 kp/h and reported his location to a patrol. Police then seized the scooter, his phone, and the balaclava worn in the videos. He was arrested and charged for driving without a license and driving without insurance.
- 13 October: Parvinder Singh Jhota, an anti-drug activist was shot dead by a medical store owner while livestreaming on Facebook in Mansa, Punjab, India. He went to the medical store owner to question about allegedly selling drugs before things spiraled out of control.
- 21 October: At a school in Kuching, Sarawak, Malaysia, a 16-year-old student attacked a teacher with an axe, injuring her. He livestreamed the attack.

== See also ==
- List of filmed mass shootings
- Beheading video
- Christchurch Call to Action Summit
- Happy slapping
- Hurtcore
- Killing of Robert Godwin, a 2017 case in which a video of the crime was posted online (but not livestreamed) by the perpetrator
- Snuff film
