= Theo Hoffman (baritone) =

American opera singer

- Born: Manhattan, New York
- Occupation: Operatic baritone
- Years active: 2013–present
- Website: theo-hoffman.com

Theo Hoffman is an American baritone, known for his performances in opera, concert and in song recital. His operatic repertoire includes the works of Mozart and Rossini, as well as modern compositions by Philip Glass, Jake Heggie and Jonathan Dove. He created the role of Denis in the world premiere of Denis & Katya, composed by Philip Venables and staged at Opera Philadelphia. He is an alumnus of the Juilliard School and the Domingo-Colburn-Stein Young Artist Program at the Los Angeles Opera and in 2018 he was named in WQXR's "40 Under 40: A New Generation of Superb Opera Singers."
