= Gusher of Lies =

2008 book by Robert Bryce

- Author: Robert Bryce
- Language: English
- Subject: Energy
- Publisher: PublicAffairs
- Publication date: March 4, 2008
- Publication place: America
- Pages: 384
- ISBN: 978-1-58648-321-0

Gusher of Lies: The Dangerous Delusions of Energy Independence is a book by Robert Bryce which was released in 2008 and is published by PublicAffairs.

== Synopsis ==
In 2008 the United States imported 60 per cent of its oil. Bryce argues that, given the size of its energy needs, the United States needs to continue importing oil. He also favors increasing domestic production of oil and gas. He acknowledges that energy independence has appeal as a slogan, but says that the reality is energy interdependence.

As in his later book Power Hungry he makes a case that renewable sources such as wind power and solar energy cannot meet the United States' (growing) energy requirements. Bryce dismisses ethanol fuel as having a cost that far outweighs the benefits. However, he believes that as world prices rise in the longer term, it will be economic to move to non-fossil sources.

== Reception ==
Dr. Michael J. Economides writing for Forbes magazine said Bryce "fires in all directions, at liberals, conservatives, Republicans and Democrats. His is a no-holds barred attack on what he believes is not just the sale of a pipedream in a global economy but one whose pursuit has become the basis for massive worldwide scams. If for nothing else, that makes this book a must read for anyone interested in navigating a future energy path".

William Grimes wrote in the New York Times that Bryce employs a "slashing, ad hominem style of attack that can undercut his credibility, especially when he moves away from economics and technology and ventures into politics, an arena to which he brings no particular expertise."

Richard Whittaker writing in the Austin Chronicle said, "Bryce makes a solid case that energy independence, a totem to both left and right, is not simply unachievable and undesirable but harmful. He depicts himself as the reasonable man facing down a cadre of xenophobes, Luddites, boondogglers, and politicos. He doesn't differentiate between the guilty parties along political lines, laying into Milton Friedman and Al Gore equally. But there are bogus conflations, like saying energy consumption equals wealth and wealth equals low child-mortality rates, even though the Btu-guzzling U.S. has one of the worst infant death rates of all industrialized nations".

== See also ==
- Pipe Dreams: Greed, Ego, and the Death of Enron
- Power Hungry: The Myths of "Green" Energy and the Real Fuels of the Future
