= Power Hungry =

2010 book by Robert Bryce

- Author: Robert Bryce
- Language: English
- Subject: Energy
- Publisher: PublicAffairs
- Publication date: April 27, 2010
- Publication place: United States
- Pages: 416
- ISBN: 978-1-58648-789-8

Power Hungry: The Myths of "Green" Energy and the Real Fuels of the Future is a book by Robert Bryce about energy, mainly from a United States perspective. It was published in 2010 by PublicAffairs. A short essay based on the book was released as an op-ed by the author in The Washington Post.

== Synopsis ==
As in his earlier book Gusher of Lies (which was about the idea of energy independence), Bryce argues that the United States needs to continue to use large amounts of fossil fuels including imported oil. However he does contemplate ways in which reliance on fossil fuels might be reduced:

- Energy efficiency: Bryce claims that the United States' record in improving energy efficiency puts it in the top three of the developed countries, and he explains the relatively high per capita energy consumption by arguing that the country is not "addicted to oil", as stated by George W. Bush, but addicted to prosperity.
- The use of nuclear power

Bryce argues that some renewable sources, such as wind farms, are not truly green and that carbon capture and storage will not work and will prove to be an expensive mistake.

== Reception ==
Trevor Butterworth writing in the Wall Street Journal praised Power Hungry as a "brutal, brilliant exploration" of the quest for green energy.

William Tucker writing for The American Spectator said that Power Hungry is filled with little tidbits that "make endlessly fascinating reading. For instance, In 1971 we consumed twice as much energy from natural gas as from coal, but coal made a comeback under Carter and overtook natural gas in 1986".

Roger A. Pielke, Jr. wrote on his blog, "Bryce's book is generally well-written and well-argued, if sprawling and at times more pastiche than systematic argument. His book has three parts. The first surveys our demand for energy and why it is inevitably going to increase. The second seeks to dispel a slew of "myths" about green energy—13 myths in all".

== See also ==
- Gusher of Lies: The Dangerous Delusions of Energy Independence
- Pipe Dreams: Greed, Ego, and the Death of Enron
