= Robert Godwin (disambiguation) =

Robert Godwin (born 1958) is a British author.

Robert Godwin may also refer to:

- Robert Godwin (Roundhead) (c. 1601–1681), English Commonwealth politician
- Bob Godwin (1911–1980), an American boxer
- Killing of Robert Godwin

== See also ==
- Robert Goodwin (disambiguation)
