= Denis & Katya =

Chamber opera by Philip Venables

Denis & Katya is an English-language chamber opera in two acts by the British composer Philip Venables, based on the real-life stories of Russian teenage truants Denis Muravyov and Katerina Vlasova. The two fell in love and fled home in order to be together and hid in a relative's home in Strugi Krasnye. The couple ended up getting into a fire fight with Russian Special Forces and eventually died.

The opera was a co-commission by Opera Philadelphia, Music Theatre Wales, and Opéra National de Montpellier. The work's premiere occurred in September 2019 by Opera Philadelphia, directed by Ted Huffman, and since has had premieres throughout Europe and in the Netherlands. The opera has been regularly performed since 2019, Pittsburgh Opera including the opera at the end of their 2022/2023 season.

The work takes 65 minutes to perform in full.

== Structure ==
The opera's form is modeled after a montage, with snippets of media talking about the incident along with fake news reports. The opera comprises 112 "microscenes" which are broken up with text messages.

== Libretto ==
The libretto was created in collaboration with writer and director Ted Huffman and was formed from interviews with those who had witnessed the events. Material was also fictionalized based on media reports and private messages between the composer and the librettist. Venables notes the main element of the opera is to tell a story:

In essence, this opera is about storytelling. It plays with the idea of storytelling, how we tell stories to each other, both in real life and on the internet. The six characters told their stories about this event, and the two performers are re-telling these stories to the audience in an act of spontaneous roleplay theatre.

== Cast ==
Voice Type	2019 Premiere
Baritone	Theo Hoffman
Mezzo-soprano	Siena Licht Miller

== Links ==
- Trailer (Nationale Opera & Ballet, 2022)
