= Bishop Kelley School =

Bishop Kelley School can refer to:

- Bishop Kelley High School in Tulsa, Oklahoma
- Bishop Kelley Catholic School in Lapeer, Michigan
