= Terror-Free Oil Initiative =

Oil Initiative

Terror-Free Oil

The Terror-Free Oil Initiative was a group based in Coral Springs, Florida, dedicated to encouraging Americans to buy only gasoline that originated in countries that do not export or finance terrorism or are otherwise unfriendly towards the United States.

It promoted those companies that acquire their crude oil supply from the nations outside Middle East and criticized those companies that do not.

TFOI intended to foster a constructive dialogue about alternative fuel production and consumption techniques.

Terror-Free Oil opened the first "terror free" gas station in Omaha, Nebraska, in January 2007. In February 2010 the station closed.

TFO spokesman Joe Kaufman is also the founder of a group called Americans Against Hate, a conservative civil rights organization and terrorism watchdog group. Kaufman is a prominent critic of the Islamic advocacy organization Council on American-Islamic Relations.

== Criticism ==
Terror-Free Oil purchased its gas from Sinclair Oil Corporation, who buy oil from all areas of the world on the New York Mercantile Exchange. After critics questioned the buying methods of the group, founder Joe Kaufman, was forced to acknowledge that the stations were likely selling some oil from the Middle East.

Journalist and writer on energy Robert Bryce also criticised the group on the American Public Media show Marketplace and the CNBC show, Closing Bell with Maria Bartiromo. Bryce stated that "the trends of energy interdependence are growing and are inexorable" and branded that idea of being able choose where your oil came from as "hogwash".
