= Bishop Kelley High School =

Private school in Tulsa, Oklahoma, United States

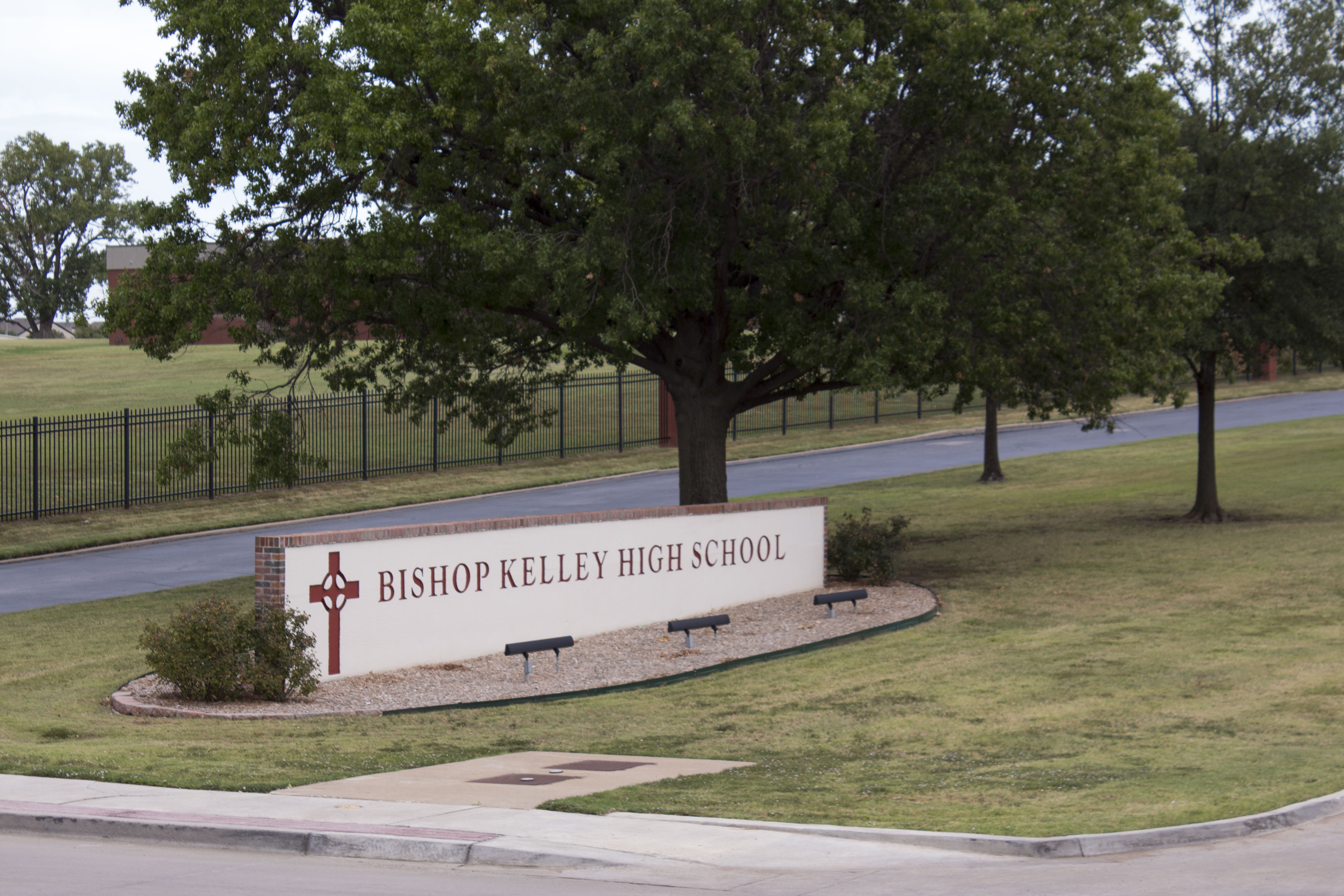

Location
- 3905 South Hudson Avenue; Midtown Tulsa; Tulsa, Oklahoma 74135-5699; United States; 36°6′20″N 95°54′37″W

Information
- Type: Private, coeducational, Lasallian
- Motto: "Turris Fortis Mihi Deus"
- Religious affiliation: Roman Catholic
- Established: 1960 (Successor to schools established as early as 1899)
- Superintendent: David Dean
- President: Sister Mary Hanah Doak
- Principal: James (Jim) Franz
- Chaplain: Fr. Jon Fincher
- Grades: 9–12
- Enrollment: 925 (2020)
- Average class size: 18
- Campus: Urban
- Colors: Red and white
- Athletics: OSSAA
- Mascot: The Comet
- Team name: Comets
- Accreditation: North Central Association of Colleges and Schools
- Newspaper: Breezeway
- Yearbook: Crest
- Affiliation: Roman Catholic
- Alumni: c. 8,000
- Athletic Director: Lance Parks
- Website: bishopkelley.org

Bishop Kelley High School is an American Lasallian Catholic high school with 905 students, grades 9 to 12, at 41st and Hudson Avenue, in the center of the Tulsa metropolitan area (in the Midtown area), on a campus spanning just over 47 acres (150,000 m^{2}). The school is formerly a function of the Roman Catholic Diocese of Tulsa, but is now incorporated separately, and operates in the Lasallian tradition of the Brothers of the Christian Schools (Christian Brothers or the French Christian Brothers).

Bishop Kelley is a comprehensive secondary school with a college-preparatory style curriculum consisting of tracks designed to fit a variety of learning abilities and interests.

Though Bishop Kelley is the diocesan Catholic high school for the Diocese of Tulsa, it serves both Catholic and non-Catholic students. The school consistently ranks as one of the best private high schools in Oklahoma.

== History ==
Bishop Kelley was established in 1960 to serve as Tulsa's citywide Catholic high school. At the time of its founding, its forerunners, Holy Family High School (founded 1899) and Marquette High School (founded in 1926), closed and consolidated their student bodies into the newly formed Bishop Kelley High School. While the initial plans for the school were developed under Bishop Eugene J. McGuinness' leadership, it was the pioneering Bishop Victor Joseph Reed who oversaw its founding. Bishop Reed was a famous Catholic reformer who attended all four sessions of the Second Vatican Council, where he was associated with the more progressive bishops, lending his support to the use of vernacular in the Mass and to an emphasis of pastoral over administrative skills in bishops. Bishop Reed is in part responsible for the high school's legacy of lay leadership. In 1960, the year Bishop Kelley High School was founded, Bishop Reed established the first mixed (clerical and lay) diocesan board of education in the United States.

The school was named for Bishop Francis Kelley, the second bishop of Oklahoma. The founder of the Catholic Church Extension Society, Bishop Kelley was an accomplished author and diplomat, whom H.L. Mencken described as "a charming Irishman" who "has had a brilliant career in the Church." He famously partnered with California oilman Edward L. Doheny to support Catholic philanthropy.

At its founding, male students were taught by the LaSallian (French) Christian Brothers, while the Sisters of Divine Providence from San Antonio, Texas taught the female students. By 1965, the school had become entirely coeducational. By 1982, the Sisters of Divine Providence had been reassigned to other ministries. As of the end of the school year 2020–2021, the Christian Brothers no longer have a presence on the campus.

The original school building was designed by architect Robert Lawton Jones, a Tulsa Catholic who had been a protege of Mies van der Rohe.

== Activities ==
Co-curricular opportunities include Academic Bowl, Christian Service, Class Board, Comet Ambassadors, Competitive One-Act, Drama, Drumline, Environmental Club, FCA, Foreign Language Clubs, 3 on 3, Jazz Choir, Kairos, Kelley Krazies (a spirit organization), Link Crew (dedicated to mentoring freshmen), Lasallian Youth, Mission Trips, National Forensic League, Performing Arts, Play Production/Theater Tech, Photography Club, ProLife Club, Retreats, Robotics, and Student Council. The school is a frequent winner of state championships in speech and debate, academic bowl, and robotics competitions.

== Athletics ==
Bishop Kelley has won more state championships than any other school of its size in Oklahoma, including state championships in baseball, football, soccer, softball, volleyball, basketball, tennis, golf and cross country. Its women's volleyball and women's soccer teams have been nationally ranked. Bishop Kelley was the first Tulsa high school to support a lacrosse team.

NCAA head coach Barry Hinson (currently coaching at Southern Illinois University) coached the men's basketball team at Bishop Kelley. Bishop Kelley is also the site for Russell Westbrook's "Why Not" Basketball camp.

=== Battle of the Bishops Rivalry ===
In football, Bishop Kelley shares a tradition with cross-state rival Bishop McGuinness Catholic High School. The winner of the contest obtains possession of the "Shillelagh Trophy" for the upcoming year. The schools also compete annually in boys and girls basketball.

=== State championships ===
Academic Bowl – 1993, 1995, 1998, 2004, 2005*, 2012, 2014, 2015, 2016, 2017, 2018, 2021, 2023, 2024

Baseball – 1976, 1978, 2004, 2006, 2011, 2018

Boys Basketball – 1995

Boys Cross Country – 1967, 1968, 1971, 1973, 1974, 1975, 1976, 2005, 2008, 2024, 2025

Girls Cross Country – 1985, 1986, 2017, 2018, 2019, 2020, 2024, 2025

Fast Pitch Softball – 1977, 1991, 1992, 1996, 2000, 2001

Football – 1981

Boys Golf – 1986, 1988, 1993, 2002, 2012, 2013, 2017, 2021

Girls Golf – 1996, 2000, 2001, 2006

Boys Soccer – 2005, 2006, 2009, 2010, 2011, 2017, 2018, 2019, 2021

Girls Soccer – 1999, 2000, 2001, 2002, 2003, 2004, 2005, 2006, 2007, 2008, 2010, 2011, 2012, 2013, 2017, 2021

Speech and Debate – 1993, 1999, 2000, 2002, 2004, 2005, 2006, 2011, 2012, 2013

Boys Tennis – 1995, 1999, 2001, 2007, 2008, 2009, 2010, 2019

Girls Tennis – 1985, 1987, 1995, 1997, 2006, 2007, 2008, 2019, 2021

Volleyball – 1989, 1990, 1991, 1992, 1998, 1999, 2000, 2001, 2002, 2005, 2007, 2008, 2009, 2010, 2011, 2012, 2015, 2018, 2020

Boys Swimming – 2019, 2020, 2021

Wrestling – 1974, 1975, 1984, 1985

Spirit Squad – 2016, 2017, 2018

Total : 132

- The 2005 Bishop Kelley Academic Bowl team defeated the national champion academic bowl team in a scrimmage, but did not compete against them during the regular season because they were in a different athletic class.

== Notable alumni ==
=== Bishop Kelley alumni ===
==== Arts, entertainment, media and letters ====
- Robert Bryce – journalist, commentator and author (books include Pipe Dreams: Greed, Ego, and the Death of Enron)
- Chris Combs – avant-garde jazz composer and musician; guitarist for Jacob Fred Jazz Odyssey
- Samantha Isler – film and television actress best known for her role in Captain Fantastic and The CW series Supernatural
- Olivia Jordan – actress, pageant winner (Miss USA 2015 and Miss World America 2013)
- Frank Main – reporter at the Chicago Sun-Times and winner of 2011 Pulitzer Prize
- Matt Villines (1995) – film director (Funny or Die, Saturday Night Live)
- Alfre Woodard – film and television actress (Academy Award-nominee; four-time Emmy Award winner; Grammy nominee)

==== Business, politics and civic life ====
- Dewey F. Bartlett Jr. – businessman and 39th Mayor of Tulsa
- John E. Dowdell – United States district judge of the United States District Court for the Northern District of Oklahoma.
- Robert Kerr Goodwin – CEO of Points of Light; former Publisher of Oklahoma Eagle (one of America's most influential black-owned newspapers)
- John M. O'Connor – nominee to be a United States district judge of the United States District Court for the Eastern District of Oklahoma, the United States District Court for the Northern District of Oklahoma, and the United States District Court for the Western District of Oklahoma
- Geoffrey Standing Bear – Principal Chief of Osage Nation
- John Sullivan – former United States congressman (R-Oklahoma)
- Children of Frank William Abagnale Jr. – FBI security consultant and criminal informant. Co-author of autobiography, Catch Me If You Can, inspiring Spielberg film of the same name.

==== Sports ====
- Inky Ajanaku – Professional volleyball player (gold medalist at 2015 Pan American Games)
- Patrick Callan – Olympic swimmer
- Dale Cook – WKA world champion in kickboxing, boxer and martial artist
- Rick Dickson – Athletic Director at University of Tulsa, Tulane University and Washington State University
- Matt Gogel – PGA golfer and golf commentator for CBS Sports
- Randy Heckenkemper – golf course architect
- Owen Heinecke – college football linebacker for the Oklahoma Sooners
- Dallas Keuchel – Major League Baseball pitcher, winner of 2015 Cy Young Award
- Chip McCaw – Olympic athlete and volleyball coach at Pepperdine University
- Charlie O'Brien – Major League Baseball catcher
- Matt Reynolds – Major League Baseball infielder
- Jason Staurovsky – NFL placekicker
- Donnie Walton – Major League Baseball infielder
- Rick Wrona – Major League Baseball catcher

=== Notable former faculty and staff ===
- Barry Hinson- American college coach for Oral Roberts (1997–1999), Missouri State (1999–2008) & Southern Illinois Salukis (2012–2019) men's basketball teams
- Daniel Henry Mueggenborg – auxiliary bishop for the Archdiocese of Seattle, former Vice Rector Pontifical North American College at the Vatican. On July 20, 2021, he was appointed bishop of Reno.
- Peter Bryan Wells – Catholic archbishop and diplomat (currently serving as Apostolic Nuncio to South Africa; formerly Assessor for General Affairs of the Secretariat of State)
