= Ted Huffman =

American opera director and librettist

- Born: 1977 (age 48–49); New York, U.S.
- Occupations: Opera director, librettist
- Years active: 2000s–present
- Notable work: 4.48 Psychosis, Denis & Katya, The Faggots and Their Friends Between Revolutions, We Are The Lucky Ones

Ted Huffman (born 1977) is an American opera and theatre director and librettist, based in London. He is particularly associated with contemporary opera and music theatre and with his long-term collaboration with the British composer Philip Venables. Together they have created works including 4.48 Psychosis (2016), Denis & Katya (2019), The Faggots and Their Friends Between Revolutions (2023) and We Are The Lucky Ones (2025). In 2025 he was appointed General Director of the Festival d'Aix-en-Provence.

== Life and career ==
Huffman was born in New York in 1977. He studied humanities at Yale University and later joined the Merola Opera Program of San Francisco Opera. In 2017 he was a MacDowell Fellow in residence with Philip Venables, and subsequently established his career in Europe; he is based in London.

In the 2000s and early 2010s he worked widely in small-scale and touring opera. For English Touring Opera he directed Peter Maxwell Davies's The Lighthouse at the Royal Opera's Linbury Theatre, winning the WhatsOnStage Award for Opera and a nomination for a Royal Philharmonic Society Music Award. His staging of Hans Werner Henze's El Cimarrón was cited in Opernwelt's critics' poll, and he directed works including Ullmann's Der Kaiser von Atlantis, Poulenc's Les mamelles de Tirésias, Ana Sokolović's Svádba and Luke Styles's Macbeth for companies and festivals such as La Monnaie, Dutch National Opera, the Festival d'Aix-en-Provence, Aldeburgh Festival, Juilliard Opera and Central City Opera. He received a Jerwood Opera Writing Fellowship from Aldeburgh Music (now Britten Pears Arts).

Huffman's breakthrough collaboration with Venables came with 4.48 Psychosis, the first authorised operatic adaptation of Sarah Kane's play, commissioned by the Royal Opera and premiered at the Lyric Hammersmith in 2016. His production later appeared at New York's Prototype Festival and the Opéra national du Rhin in Strasbourg, and won the 2016 UK Theatre Award for Opera as well as nominations for an Olivier Award, a Royal Philharmonic Society Award and a South Bank Sky Arts Award.

Their chamber opera Denis & Katya, about a 2016 live-streamed standoff involving two Russian teenagers, was premiered at Opera Philadelphia's O19 festival in 2019, with Huffman as librettist and director. Co-commissioned with Music Theatre Wales and Opéra national de Montpellier, it has since been staged by institutions including Dutch National Opera, Finnish National Opera and Staatsoper Hannover. The work won the 2019 FEDORA – Generali Prize for Opera and the 2020 Ivor Novello Award for Stage Work, and received nominations at the International Opera Awards and in Opernwelt's annual survey.

Huffman directed the world premiere of Kris Defoort's The Time of Our Singing at La Monnaie, Brussels, in 2021; the production later travelled to Theater St. Gallen and won the "World Premiere" category at the 2022 International Opera Awards. For Opernhaus Zürich he staged Stefan Wirth's The Girl with a Pearl Earring in 2022, voted "World Premiere of the Year" in Opernwelt's poll.

His and Venables's music-theatre work The Faggots and Their Friends Between Revolutions, based on Larry Mitchell's 1977 queer cult book, premiered at the 2023 Manchester International Festival before touring to the Festival d'Aix-en-Provence, Bregenzer Festspiele, Holland Festival and London's Southbank Centre. Critics highlighted its minimalist staging and collective storytelling around queer community and activism. Their large-scale opera We Are The Lucky Ones, created with playwright Nina Segal, was commissioned by Dutch National Opera and premiered there in March 2025 as part of the Opera Forward Festival; Huffman co-wrote the libretto and directed the production.

Alongside new works he has directed canonical operas at major houses and festivals. His staging of Monteverdi's L'incoronazione di Poppea for the Festival d'Aix-en-Provence in 2022 toured to Versailles, Cologne, Rennes, Toulon and Nederlandse Reisopera, and was shortlisted at the International Opera Awards and included in The New York Times's list of the best classical music performances of 2022. Other productions have included Puccini's Madama Butterfly and Gounod's Roméo et Juliette for Opernhaus Zürich, Tchaikovsky's Eugene Onegin for the Royal Opera, Weill's Street Scene for the Paris Opera's Académie, Handel's Il trionfo del tempo e del disinganno for the Royal Danish Theatre and Opéra national de Montpellier, and Britten's A Midsummer Night's Dream for the Deutsche Oper Berlin and Opéra national de Montpellier. At the Festival d'Aix-en-Provence he has also directed Sokolović's Svádba, Poulenc's Les mamelles de Tirésias and The Story of Billy Budd, Sailor, an abridged adaptation of Britten's Billy Budd arranged by Oliver Leith.

Huffman first attended the Festival d'Aix-en-Provence through its Académie and has since been a regular collaborator. On 27 October 2025 the festival announced that he would become its General Director from 1 January 2026, with his own artistic planning scheduled to begin in 2028.

== Works ==
=== Stage works as writer (selection) ===
- Denis & Katya (2019), chamber opera with Philip Venables, Opera Philadelphia; winner of the FEDORA – Generali Prize for Opera and the Ivor Novello Award for Stage Work.
- The Faggots and Their Friends Between Revolutions (2023), music-theatre work with Venables after Larry Mitchell, premiered at Manchester International Festival and co-produced by several European festivals.
- We Are The Lucky Ones (2025), large-scale opera with Venables and Nina Segal, commissioned by Dutch National Opera and Residentie Orkest.
