= Pskov standoff and double suicide =

Russian teenagers (died by suicide 2016)

Denis Muravyov Katerina Vlasova
- One of the perpetrators, Denis Muravyov, shooting at a police van while livestreaming the event.
- Location: 58.267686°N 29.105075°E; 9 Kudryavtsev Street, Strugi Krasnye, Pskov Oblast, Russia
- Date: November 14, 2016; 9 years ago
- Attack type: Shootout, ambush
- Weapons: Two double-barreled shotguns; Tokarev TT pistol; Knife (unused)
- Deaths: 2 (both perpetrators)
- Injuries: 1 (Vlasova's mother)
- Perpetrators: Denis Muravyov; Katerina Vlasova
- Motive: Conflict with relatives; Desire for infamy

Denis Olegovich Muravyov (14 August 2001 – 14 November 2016) and Katerina Alekseevna Vlasova (10 September 2001 – 14 November 2016) were two 15-year-olds from Pskov, Russia, who were involved in an armed standoff with police in Strugi Krasnye, an urban locality about 87 kilometers (54 miles) northeast of Pskov, on the afternoon of 14 November 2016. The two had barricaded themselves in a house after running away from home three days earlier and were being searched by police, who were fired upon when they arrived at the house; the standoff ended when both teenagers committed suicide. The event was livestreamed on Periscope by the perpetrators, who called themselves the "Russian Bonnie and Clyde" and "Romeo and Juliet", causing a wide resonance and discussion on social media.

== Background ==
Denis Muravyov and Katerina Vlasova met in the spring of 2016. After adding each other in VKontakte, they continued to meet in person and soon began dating, which Muravyov kept a secret from his parents. Muravyov's mother eventually found out about her son's relationship with Vlasova when, sometime during spring break, Muravyov left home one night after claiming he was going to sleep over at a friend's house, but instead went for a walk with Vlasova. After this incident, Muravyov's mother forbade her son to communicate with Vlasova.

== Events ==
At around 6 a.m. on the morning of 11 November 2016, Muravyov used his mother's credit card to withdraw money in order to purchase two minibus tickets for him and Vlasova. After noticing their son's disappearance, Muravyov's parents began searching for him and filed a missing persons report with the police. Vlasova's family also noticed her disappearance but did not participate in the search for their daughter, although they reported that she had not been home for two days. The search for Muravyov and Vlasova continued over the weekend, but was unsuccessful.

On the afternoon of 14 November, Muravyov and Vlasova were located in a dacha owned by Vlasova's stepfather on Kudryavtsev Street in Strugi Krasnye, where they had been hiding for the past three days. Two days before, on 12 November, Muravyov had contacted his stepsister, who lived in Saint Petersburg, and asked her to rent an apartment for him and Vlasova. The couple planned to travel there via BlaBlaCar on 14 November, but were presumably interrupted by the arrival of Vlasova's mother, who went looking for them after learning where they were. Instead, the teenagers barricaded themselves in a room and opened a safe containing several weapons, including two double-barreled shotguns and a Tokarev TT pistol, which they would use in the subsequent shootout.

Muravyov then shot Vlasova's mother in the thigh when she arrived at the address. Vlasova's mother sent a message to Muravyov's mother asking her to come, telling her that there was a shooting happening. Meanwhile, Muravyov and Vlasova started livestreaming on the social media platform Periscope. In total, the two livestreamed five times, with each broadcast lasting anywhere from one to four hours.

A police van then pulled up to the house and was immediately shot at by the teenagers, who fired upon it from a second-floor window. It was initially believed that Muravyov was holding Vlasova hostage, and the police demanded that he release her before finding out that she was one of the shooters. A policeman managed to persuade Muravyov to hand over all the weapons in the house, which he and Vlasova agreed would be given to Muravyov's mother. After counting the weapons, however, the police suspected that Muravyov and Vlasova had not handed over everything, which they denied. Vlasova's stepfather, who owned the firearms stored in the house, confirmed that the teenagers still had weapons.

Muravyov's mother had a conversation with her son and attempted to convince him to surrender, telling him not to worry about what had happened and promising them that she would not abandon them and would do everything they wanted. Following the conversation, Muravyov and Vlasova asked for 40 minutes to think everything over and then they would come out. After the time had passed, however, Muravyov asked for another five minutes, at which point a SOBR police tactical unit that had been dispatched to the scene decided to storm the house. According to investigators, the policemen did not fire their weapons during the raid, and the teenagers were found dead. Muravyov's mother later stated that during the raid, there were two loud bangs, a bright flash, and smoke coming from the doors.

Before committing suicide, the teenagers posted identical farewell messages to their relatives on their VKontakte pages, accusing them of "destroying their psyche and lives":

I loved you, but you yourself didn't notice how you destroyed my psyche and my life. Goodbye to all my friends, family and acquaintances. Don't worry, I will leave beautifully. Good luck to everyone in your life and please don't be afraid to live life the way you want or think you should. Living life at your own pleasure is the best life. Love you

== Investigation ==
The Investigative Committee of Russia opened a criminal case under Article 317 of the Criminal Code of the Russian Federation, regarding attempts on the life of law enforcement officers. About 50 people, including policemen, relatives of the victims, witnesses to the incident, and the teenagers' classmates were questioned. A postmortem psychological and psychiatric forensic examination of the deceased teenagers was conducted at the Serbsky Center for Psychiatry.

According to a representative of the Ministry of Internal Affairs, law enforcement personnel went to Strugi Krasnye to search for Muravyev, who had been reported missing. When the policemen were fired upon, they blocked the building and entered into negotiations with the teenagers, who did not make any demands during the standoff. The Investigative Committee region stated that the authorities negotiated with the gunmen for several hours, but no result was achieved. The raid began after the teenagers stopped contacting with the police outside. The prosecutor's office recognized the actions of the SOBR operators as lawful.

=== Criticism of law enforcement ===
A policeman who failed to properly verify the missing persons report, which would've included collecting and studying data about the teenagers' personalities and social circle, was charged with negligence.

Several media outlets and online users accused law enforcement of deliberately killing the teens. Prosecutors claimed that Muravyev shot Vlasova and then himself before the SOBR team reached their room, contradicting the teenagers' conversations captured on their livestream, which indicated they did not want to commit suicide and that they had no ammunition left. The Rosgvardia claimed that the police special forces did not open fire during the storming of the house, leading some online users to speculate that the teenagers may have lied about running out of ammunition.

Denis Muravyov's family stated that they believed the policemen who arrived on the scene acted wrongly, leaving the teenagers with no choice other than suicide. In late November 2016, Muravyov's stepfather, on the advice of mutual acquaintances, contacted Lev Shlosberg, a deputy and chairman of the Pskov branch of the Yabloko party. Shlosberg helped the family draft letters demanding that criminal cases against the police be opened by the Investigative Committee and the Prosecutor General's Office, and sent parliamentary inquiries on his own behalf. His reason for helping with the case was the unreliable version of the Investigative Committee's investigation that was being actively disseminated in the media, stating that he had every reason to believe that the investigation's version of events is "at least hasty, if not erroneous." According to Shlosberg, the authorities had deviated from standard protocol when dealing with juvenile offenders, and, per the regulations, should've brought in a psychologist, negotiator, or a specialist in communicating with children to negotiate with the teenagers. As a result of the investigation and numerous complaints, several criminal cases were initiated, many of which were subsequently closed.

== Aftermath ==
The incident instantly became a topic of discussion among the peers of the deceased teenagers. Online groups dedicated to Muravyev and Vlasova began to appear on social networks, with the total number of subscribers to these online groups amounting to almost 25,000, around 60% of whom are girls. Internet posts praising the teenagers as “defenseless" and "freedom fighters” and comparing them to Bonnie and Clyde, two infamous American outlaws who committed numerous criminal acts during the Great Depression, appeared on social media, as well as fanfictions depicting romantic interpretations of the incident, and William Shakespeare's literary work "Romeo and Juliet".

Following the incident, State Duma Deputy Speaker Irina Yarovaya and Children's Ombudsman Anna Kuznetsova called for tighter control over the internet, as they believe that online communities and destructive groups are promoting suicide among minors. MP Elena Mizulina, on her Twitter page, blamed the incident on computer games.

Russian Deputy Prime Minister Olga Golodets said that after the incident, Russia will reform the psychological support services in schools. At a meeting of the commission on juvenile affairs in the administration, the head of the Pskov Region Education Department proposed developing guidelines for the prevention of suicidal behavior among adolescents following the incident.

A survey by the Russian Center for Public Opinion Research showed that 51% of respondents blame the parents of Muravyov and Vlasova for what happened.

== In popular culture ==
- "Why?", an episode of the Russian talk show Let Them Talk with Andrey Malakhov, is dedicated to the events of the standoff.
- "Death Online", an issue of the NTV program Central Television, is devoted to the investigation into the standoff.
- In 2018, singer Diana Arbenina collaborated with the Russian rock band Nochnye Snaipery to record a song about the teenagers' background. A music video for the song was directed by Valeria Germanika.
- British composer Philip Venables adapted the event into an opera called Denis & Katya, which premiered in Philadelphia in 2019 and in the United Kingdom in 2020.
- In March 2021, a play based on the incident was staged in Tyumen. The production took the form of monologues, in which the participants shared their personal experiences of the incident.
- On June 23, 2022, the Russian crime drama Interseason based on the incident was released.
- On November 9, 2022, the documentary film Manifesto premiered; it includes footage of the teenagers’ livestream.
- The song "Golosami" ("Voices") by the Russian rock band Operation Plasticine contains an allusion to Muravyov and Vlasova.

== See also ==
- List of mass shootings in Russia
- Livestreamed crime
