= We Are The Lucky Ones =

Opera by Philip Venables

- Opera by Philip Venables
- Librettist: Nina Segal and Ted Huffman
- Language: English
- Premiere: 14 March 2025; Dutch National Opera

We Are The Lucky Ones is an opera composed by Philip Venables with a libretto by Nina Segal and Ted Huffman. Commissioned by the Dutch National Opera, the opera premiered on 14 March 2025 at the Dutch National Opera & Ballet in Amsterdam. The production is part of the Opera Forward Festival 2025.

== Background ==
The opera is based on interviews with more than seventy individuals from Western Europe born between 1940 and 1949. Their collective memories form a time capsule of the past eighty years, exploring individual experiences and societal changes over the decades. The narrative raises questions about the relationship between the private and the political, the impact of personal choices, and what truly matters in the end.

== Production ==
We Are The Lucky Ones marks the fourth collaboration between composer Philip Venables and director Ted Huffman, and their first orchestral opera. Playwright Nina Segal joins them for this project. The conductor for this production is Bassem Akiki, known for his interpretations of new music. The opera features the Residentie Orkest and a cast of eight soloists.

=== Creative team ===
- **Composition** – Philip Venables
- **Libretto** – Nina Segal and Ted Huffman
- **Musical direction** – Bassem Akiki
- **Stage direction and set design** – Ted Huffman
- **Costume design** – Ted Huffman, Sonoko Kamimura
- **Lighting design** – Bertrand Couderc
- **Movement** – Pim Veulings
- **Video design** – Nadja Sofie Eller, Tobias Staab
- **Dramaturgy** – Nina Segal, Laura Roling

== Roles ==
Roles and cast for the premiere
Role	Voice type	Premiere cast
One	Soprano	Claron McFadden
Two	Soprano	Jacquelyn Stucker
Three	Mezzo-soprano	Nina van Essen
Four	Mezzo-soprano	Helena Rasker
Five	Tenor	Miles Mykkanen
Six	Tenor	Frederick Ballentine
Seven	Baritone	Germán Olvera
Eight	Bass	Alex Rosen

== Performance and reception ==
The opera was premiered at the Dutch National Opera on March 14, 2025, as part of the Opera Forward Festival. It has been described as a reflection on personal and political history, exploring themes of memory and identity. The production has garnered attention for its innovative approach to storytelling through music.
