= We Are Sthlm sexual assaults =

Sexual assaults

Dozens of reported sexual assaults in 2014 and 2015 at We Are Sthlm, a youth festival in the Swedish capital Stockholm, were not publicised by the police. The Stockholm police had received 38 reports of sexual harassment at We Are Sthlm in 2014 and 2015 together, from female visitors at the festival, most of whom were under 15 years of age, but had not publicized these reported harassments in their press releases then. Police spokesperson Varg Gyllander in 2016, during the commotion about the 2015–16 New Year's Eve sexual assaults in Germany, suggested that this non-reporting in 2015 and 2014 may partly have been caused by the police's fear to "talk about these things in the context of the immigration debate today".

== Background ==
We Are Sthlm was established as a summer music festival for youth in 2000 under the name "Ung08" with free yearly public concerts and events in central Stockholm. The venture was successful and received support from Stockholm Municipality in 2003. In 2013, the festival was attended by 160,000 people and changed its name to "We Are Sthlm".

Rapes were reported at Swedish music festivals at Arvika in 2006 and 2010, at Emmaboda in 2014, and at Bråvalla in 2015. At the Arvika festivals, the police publicized reports of rape but characterized both of the festivals as "calm".

== 2014 and 2015 festivals ==
In 2014 and 2015 together, 38 incidents of sexual harassment at We Are Sthlm were reported to the police by female visitors at the festival, most of whom were under 15 years of age, but the Stockholm police did not publicize about these alleged harassments in their press releases then, also the assaults seem to not have been fully investigated. A police spokesman played down the scale of these harassment incidents: around 15 such reports, by 170,000 people for five days gathered in an open youth music festival, "is still too many, but also not very much".

In connection to the 2015 festival, Sveriges Radio in August 2015 reported that sexual harassment had occurred that year, and that festival had been plagued by the same problems for several years.

Newspaper Dagens Nyheter on 10 January 2016, during the commotion over the 2015–16 New Year's Eve sexual assaults in Germany, had obtained internal documents from the police and wrote about what they now framed as a police cover-up of sex assaults. Dagens Nyheter analyzed that sexual harassment had been a problem since the festival started in 2000, but that the information had been withheld due to concern for the reputation of the event.

Police spokesperson Varg Gyllander on 11 January 2016 suggested that the non-reporting in 2015 and 2014 had been ""self censorship" on the part of individual officers", as certain "police employees ... are afraid of talking about these things in the context of the immigration debate today".

== 2016 media coverage ==
On 9 January, crime reporter Lasse Wierup published an article in newspaper Dagens Nyheter as a reaction to the New Year's Eve sexual assaults in Germany, especially in Cologne. Wierup pointed to the similarity of the German assaults to reports of incidents in Kalmar and at the We Are Sthlm festival in August 2015. Wierup was critical of the absence of media attention and posed questions on the reasons for the lack of attention and what it meant for the safety of women in public spaces. Dagens Nyeter received a tip about the event, but failed to get it verified. The following day, Dagens Nyheter published an article criticizing the Stockholm police for withholding the information in their media communication, and pointed to something as the reason for not reporting on the assaults.

The story received international attention, partly as it was broken shortly after sexual assaults in various German cities and the Swedish city of Malmö over the New Year. The Guardian reported that police and "the media" were alleged to have "deliberately under-report[ed]" the assaults in order to not increase anti-immigrant sentiment.

According to one memo, police in 2015 were told to be vigilant of young men sexually assaulting women in the crowd, as the previous year such offences had been committed, mostly by migrants, including Afghans. David Brax, a scholar of hate crimes at the University of Gothenburg, hypothesised that police were concerned there would be revenge attacks against other migrants if the crimes were made public, but also predicted that a cover-up would vindicate the far-right's belief that the media do not report on migrant crime.

National police commissioner Dan Eliasson ordered an internal review with the possibility of disciplinary action or criminal proceedings if police had committed any offences. The Prime Minister of Sweden, Stefan Löfven, said that the women assaulted were victims of a "double betrayal" and promised to respond quickly to address the events.

A 15-year-old boy was arrested on 11 January 2016 on charges of assault and sexual assault against two 14-year-old girls at the summer 2015 festival.

== 2018 festival ==
After closing the festival earlier and changing order of the acts they managed to get a 90% decrease of the number of incidents.

== Reactions ==
Sweden's Prime Minister Stefan Löfven harshly criticised the police:

"I feel a very strong anger that young women are not able to go to a music festival without being offended, sexually harassed and attacked... It is a major democratic problem for the whole of our country," he said of the police failure to release timely information of the incidents to the public.

== Allegations of media cover-up ==
There were accusations of media cover-ups. The Sweden Democrats, a social conservative, anti-immigration party, claimed in January 2016 that DN had been made aware of the crimes, but had not reported them because it would have benefited the Sweden Democrats' agenda. In an anonymous interview with Norwegian magazine Journalisten, a psychologist claimed to have given DN the tip, strongly criticizing the paper for not reacting. DN editor Caspar Opitz has rejected the accusations, claiming that his newspaper investigated the tip seriously but could not confirm it. Answering questions, Opitz wrote that his staff had made multiple attempts to investigate, and had even found that some of the information in the tip (for example, that large numbers of people had been arrested) was not true. He further stated that the scarcity of leads meant that not even alternative media had covered the story.

== See also ==
- 2015–16 New Year's Eve sexual assaults in Germany
- 2017 Uppsala rape
