= Siena Licht Miller =

American classical mezzo-soprano

- Born: Portland, Oregon, U.S.
- Education: Oberlin Conservatory, Curtis Institute of Music
- Occupation(s): Singer (mezzo soprano), actress, arts advocate
- Website: sienalichtmiller.com

Siena Licht Miller is a German-American mezzo-soprano singer who performs internationally in opera, as well as traditional and contemporary repertoire. She has been described by the Chicago Tribune as singing with "an exquisite blend of vocal brilliance and profound depth" and has performed at Carnegie Hall by invitation of Marilyn Horne, as a soloist with Opera Philadelphia where she starred in the world premiere of Denis & Katya, as Hermia in the Benjamin Britten opera A Midsummer Night's Dream and as Zweite Dame in Die Zauberflöte. In concert, Licht Miller has collaborated with the BBC Philharmonic, Dallas Symphony at the Bravo! Vail Music Festival, the Oregon Symphony, and the Charlotte Symphony Orchestra. Since 2022 she is a featured resident soloist with the Zurich Opera House after her two years with the International Opera Studio.

== Personal life and education ==
Licht Miller was born in Portland, Oregon, to a German mother and American father and spent her childhood in both countries. Licht Miller's first experience of musicianship was as a child learning violin in Portland at age four. Her teacher had been a violinist for the San Francisco Opera and challenged Licht Miller to sing the violin phrases as well as play them. This led to her growing interest for singing. At a local young artist's competition, she was approached by conductor/composer Niel DePonte. "He really encouraged me to take it further", she later stated.

Her training began at the Oberlin Conservatory of Music and subsequently she was awarded a full tuition scholarship to the Curtis Institute of Music, achieving a master's degree in operatic performance. Licht Miller is an alumna of the training programs of Santa Fe Opera, Opera Theatre of Saint Louis, the Chautauqua Institute, and the Aspen Music Festival.

Licht Miller has worked in master classes with Renee Fleming, Placido Domingo and Marilyn Horne.

== Voice ==
Licht Miller sings in the mezzo-soprano range. The Chicago Tribune has noted Licht Miller's "radiance and all-encompassing warmth of her sound". Licht Miller's voice has been described as having a "polished mezzo glow" by the Philadelphia Inquirer.

In reviewing the opera Denis and Katya, OperaToday.com observed "Mezzo Miller not only has a lovely and sincere stage presence, but also sports a ripe lyric mezzo that seems to know no bounds… Ms. Miller's effortlessly fluid vocalizing and warmly appealing timbre are richly colored and dramatically compelling."

== Career ==
Licht Miller works in opera, concert, and recital performances. In 2017, while in her graduate studies at the Curtis Institute, she made her professional debut with Opera Philadelphia, and upon completion of her degree, joined the roster of Columbia Artists Management that same year.

In 2020, Licht Miller moved to Switzerland to join the International Opera Studio at the Zurich Opera House and is a resident featured soloist since 2022. According to Operabase.com, she has performed with Cecilia Bartoli, Diana Damrau, Marco Armiliato, Camilla Nylund and Sabine Devieilhe.

By invitation from Digital Art Zurich, Licht Miller starred in an "experimental performance combining classical singing, electronic music and multimedia art installations on stage at the Zurich Opera House as part of DA Z for the first time." In 2022, she performed on tour in Istanbul with the Zurich Ballet for their run of Christian Spuck's Anna Karenina.

On the concert stage, her collaborations include the BBC Philharmonic Orchestra in selections from Engelbert Humperdinck's Hansel and Gretel conducted by Sir Andrew Davis, La clemenza di Tito (Annio) in concert with Cecilia Bartoli (Sesto) and Les Musiciens du Prince-Monaco, the Dallas Symphony at Bravo Vail! and the Oregon Symphony for Beethoven's Symphony No. 9.

Licht Miller is represented worldwide by Opus 3 Artists.

== Repertoire ==
=== Opera ===
Roles:

- Hänsel, Hänsel und Gretel, (Humperdinck)
- Serse, Serse, (Handel)
- Annio, La clemenza di Tito (Mozart)
- L'enfant, L'enfant et les sortilèges, (Ravel)
- Lucretia, The Rape of Lucretia, (Britten)
- Hermia, A Midsummer Nights Dream, (Britten)
- Ruggiero, Alcina, (Handel)
- Flosshilde, Das Rheingold, (Wagner)
- Flosshilde, Götterdämmerung, (Wagner)
- Rossweisse, Die Walküre, (Wagner)
- Dido, Dido and Aeneas, (Purcell)
- Kitty Oppenheimer, Doctor Atomic, (Adams)
- Mallika, Lakmé, (Delibes)
- Angelina, La Cenerentola, (Rossini)
- Olga, Eugene Onegin, (Tchaikovsky)
- Dinah, Trouble in Tahiti, (Bernstein)
- Charlotte, Werther, (Massenet)
- Ottavia, L'incoronazione di Poppea, (Monteverdi)
  - per Operabase

=== Concert ===
As a recitalist, Licht Miller has joined Ravinia Steans Music Institute for their winter song tour and a spring residency at Caramoor with New York Festival of Song and performed a recital with the Carnegie Hall Citywide Concert Series. Wagner's Wesendonck Lieder with pianist Ann-Katrin Stöcker at the Baur au Lac in Zurich.

- Handel, Messiah
- Beethoven, Missa Solemnis
- Beethoven, Symphonie 9
- Bach, Matthäus-Passion
- Mozart, Requiem
- Dvořák, Stabat Mater
- Ravel, Sheherezade
- Berlioz, Les nuits d'été
- Schumann, Frauenliebe und Leben
- Berg, Sieben Frühe Lieder
- Brahms, Zigeunerlieder
- Wagner, Wesendonck Lieder

== Accolades and awards ==
- 2017 Partners for the Arts "Promising young artist" award
- 2018, 2019 Metropolitan Opera Regional Finalist
- 2019 Gerda Lissner Grant Award
- 2019 Musical America New Artist of the Month
