= Technological University of Guadalajara attack =

2024 attack in Mexico

- Location: Guadalajara, Jalisco, Mexico
- Date: 6 March 2024 c. 13:50 – c. 17:20
- Attack type: Spree killing, mass stabbing, school attack
- Weapons: LIANTRAL multi-tool camping hatchet; MTech Reaper USMA1020BK folding blade knife; Unidentified model fixed-blade spear-point knife
- Deaths: 3 (1 at the motel)
- Injuries: 1
- Perpetrator: Gabriel Alejandro Galaviz González
- Motive: Inconclusive, possibly: Homicidal ideation; Mental illness

On the afternoon of Wednesday, March 6, 2024, a series of attacks were recorded at two locations in the city of Guadalajara, in the state of Jalisco, Mexico, when an individual first murdered a woman in a motel and then two others at the campus of a private university.

Following his arrest, the attacker, identified as a 20-year-old young man, was charged and subjected to the precautionary measure of preventive detention for one year at the Puente Grande Metropolitan Prison. However, nearly five months after the events, the accused took his own life by jumping from a height of approximately six meters, corresponding to the second level of the penitentiary center.

The crime caused profound shock, given that attacks on educational centers are rare in Mexico. This case, in particular, was the first of its kind recorded in Guadalajara.

== Attack ==
Around 13:50 hours (GMT-6), the suspect entered the Gran Vía motel, located at the intersection of Calzada Independencia and Avenida Washington. After paying for a suite, he met with a woman identified as Mónica Abigail Najar Susilla, aged 25, whom he murdered inside the room. Subsequently, he left the place around 16:40 hours and headed toward the university campus. Images captured by the establishment's security cameras corroborated his responsibility for the homicide.

At 17:12 hours, calls began arriving to emergency services, alerting to the presence of a violent individual inside the facilities of the UTEG University Center's “Plantel Olímpica”, located at the intersection of Calzada Olímpica and Calle Marcelino García Barragán. According to eyewitness testimonies, the attacker began by breaking the glass doors providing access to the classrooms, chasing several students without saying a word, before heading to the institution's administrative area, where he murdered two workers: Blanca Lilia Rodríguez Galeana, aged 37, an administrative employee, and Ana Gabriela Morales Contreras, admissions coordinator. Additionally, an academic assistant from the institution was injured: Diego Aurelio Vásquez, aged 25. Upon the arrival of authorities, the aggressor attempted to barricade himself in the library, blocking the entrance with tables and chairs, but was ultimately subdued and detained by officers from the Jalisco Security Secretariat.

== Perpetrator ==
The aggressor was identified as Gabriel Alejandro Galaviz González, aged 20. UTEG confirmed that he had no connection whatsoever with the institution.

The then-state prosecutor of Jalisco, Luis Joaquín Méndez Ruíz, preliminarily reported that the detained individual was part of a virtual community dedicated to venerating violent crimes, which may have inspired him. However, authorities have not been able to clarify the reason why the aggressor chose that particular campus as the scene for an attack against its academic community.

José Antonio Pérez Juárez, head of the General Directorate of Prevention and Social Reintegration of Jalisco, reported that Galaviz had exhibited concerning behavior since childhood, manifesting, for example, in an early history of animal cruelty. He also mentioned that the young man had a complete disconnection from his parents, which led him to leave the family home years earlier and, since then, to depend on the financial support of a brother, with whom he still maintained contact, to survive.

On the same day, hours before carrying out the murders, Galaviz wrote on his Facebook profile the caption: “Hoy es el día” (Today is the day), and then, in a subsequent act, displayed his arsenal of bladed weapons through photographs. The stylized bandana that partially covered his face resembled that of Guilherme Taucci Monteiro, one of the two perpetrators of the Suzano massacre, whom Galaviz had previously referenced on his profile.

== Aftermath ==
During his legal process, his lawyer had argued that the accused had committed the crimes while in mentally disturbed state, attempting to declare him not criminally responsible, but this motion was rejected by the control judge. During his imprisonment, he was isolated from the rest of the prison population with the main objective of addressing the high suicidal risk he presented, as well as to prevent possible attacks from other inmates.

At 19:55 hours on Monday, August 5, 2024, the death of Galaviz was confirmed at the Guadalajara Civil Hospital after suffering severe cranioencephalic trauma by jumping six meters from the second floor of the Puente Grande Metropolitan Prison. A hearing had been scheduled for September 14 of that year, but with the death of the accused, the criminal case was also dismissed.

== See also ==
- San Andrés Preparatory School attack, another school attack that occurred in the same city eight months later with a nearly identical arsenal
