= How Vitka Chesnok Drove Lyokha Shtyr to the House for Disabled =

- Directed by: Aleksandr Khant
- Written by: Aleksey Borodachyov
- Produced by: Vladimir Malyshev; Fyodor Popov; Pavel Shumov
- Starring: Aleksei Serebryakov; Evgeniy Tkachuk; Dmitry Arkhangelsky
- Cinematography: Daniil Fomichyov
- Production company: VGIK Debut
- Release date: 10 October 2017
- Running time: 90 minutes
- Country: Russia
- Language: Russian

How Vitka Chesnok Drove Lyokha Shtyr to the House for Disabled (Russian: Как Витька Чеснок вёз Лёху Штыря в дом инвалидов, romanized: Kak Vitka Chesnok vyoz Lyokhu Shtyrya v dom invalidov) is a Russian crime drama film directed by Aleksandr Khant. It stars Aleksei Serebryakov and Yevgeny Tkachuk.

== Plot ==
27-year-old Vitka Chesnokov, known by his nickname "Chesnok," is a man hardened by his childhood in a children's home. Now working at a waste recycling plant in a provincial town, Vitka feels trapped by the confines of his life, burdened by an unloving wife, an overbearing mother-in-law, and a young son who all prevent him from pursuing the life he desires with his young lover, Lariska. When Vitka learns that his estranged father, Lyokha "Shtyr," a hardened criminal with a violent past, has returned to town, he sees an unexpected opportunity to change his fortunes. Lyokha, once abusive and responsible for the hardships that sent Vitka to the children's home, is now paralyzed and unable to speak, under the care of a social worker who hopes Vitka will relinquish any claim to Lyokha’s apartment. Seeing a chance to secure a home of his own, Vitka decides to take his father to a disabled home, not realizing that this road trip will force him to confront both dangers and profound truths about himself.

Setting off in his decrepit Daewoo Damas, Vitka embarks on a tense journey with his father, planning to rid himself of this unwanted burden. Along the way, however, a car accident and a series of encounters disrupt his plans, leading to unexpected revelations. After a medical intervention brings Lyokha back to partial consciousness, he takes control of the journey, ordering Vitka at gunpoint to drive him to an unknown destination, where he promises to prove his worth and leave Vitka with the promised inheritance. This tense road trip forces father and son to confront buried grievances and unresolved anger, with encounters ranging from Lyokha's estranged daughter, Nastya, to an old friend and a confrontation with gangsters led by an aging crime boss named Platon. In a climactic scene at a sand quarry, Vitka intervenes to save Lyokha from certain death, and he finds himself wrestling with newfound understanding and unresolved feelings toward his father. The film closes as Vitka finally leaves Lyokha at the care home but hesitates before driving away, reflecting on his past and uncertain future.

== Cast ==
- Aleksey Serebryakov as Lyokha Shtyr
- Yevgeny Tkachuk as Vitka Chesnok
- Dmitry Arkhangelsky as Chebur

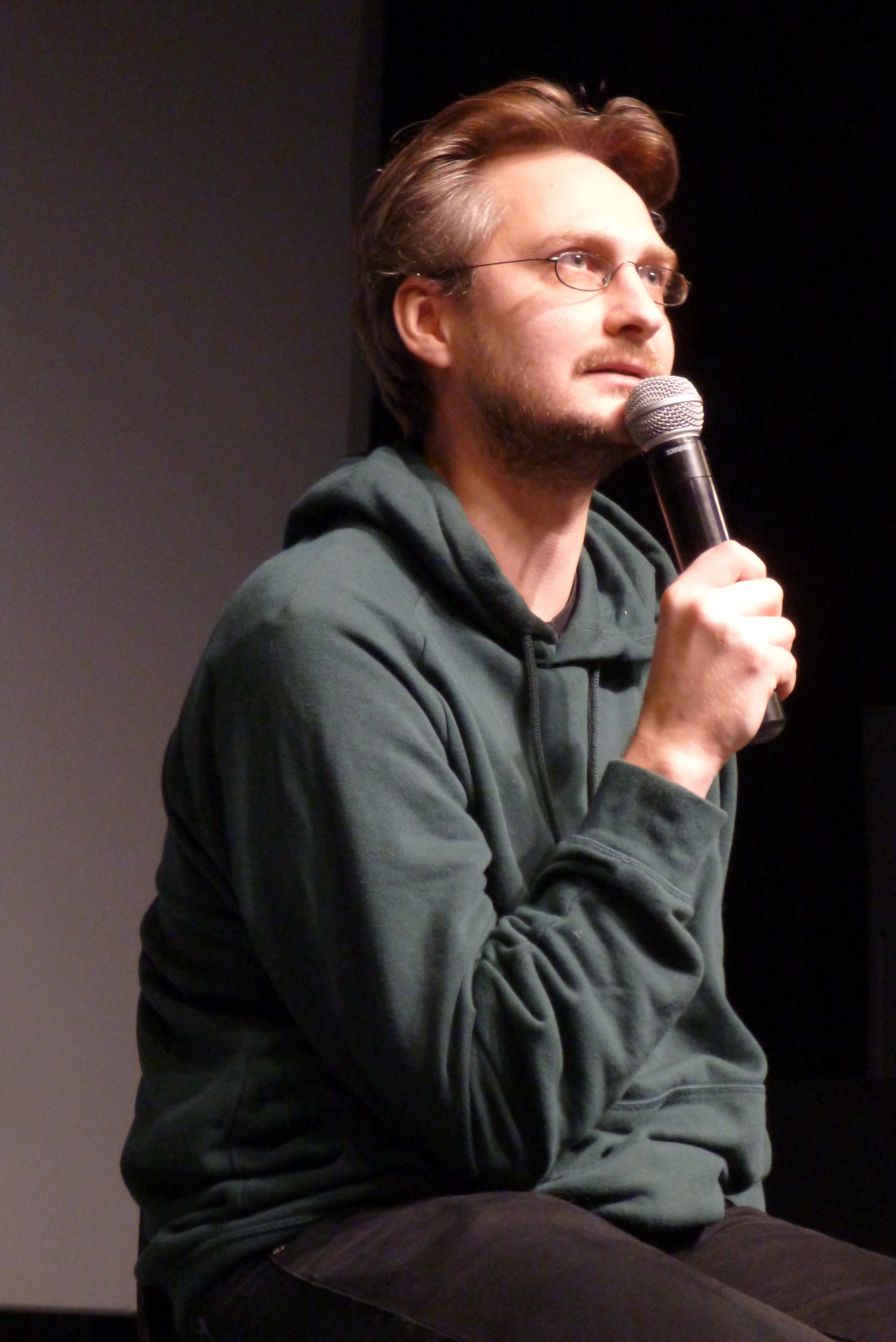
Film director Aleksandr Khant in 2018

- Sergey Bukreev as Sorokin
- Georgy Kudrenko as Mishka Kum
- Olga Lapshina as mother-in-law
- Andrey Smirnov as Platon
- Natalia Vdovina as Vera

== Awards ==
- Karlovy Vary International Film Festival: Best Director (Aleksandr Khant)
- Nika Award: Discovery of the Year (Aleksandr Khant)
