= Robert Lawton Jones =

American architect

Robert "Bob" L. Jones, Sr.
- Born: Robert Lawton Jones; May 12, 1925; McAlester, Oklahoma
- Died: September 24, 2018 (aged 93); Santa Fe New Mexico
- Education: University of Notre Dame, Illinois Institute of Technology
- Occupation: Architect
- Awards: AIA Fellow
- Buildings: Tulsa International Airport, Cox Business Center

Robert "Bob" Lawton Jones (1925-2018) was an American architect and academic recognized for his contributions to modernist architecture.

== Background and career ==
Bob Jones was born in McAlester, Oklahoma on May 12, 1925 and remained there through graduation from high school in 1943, enlisting in and serving the Navy as a midshipman during the rest of World War II. After the war, Jones attended the University of Notre Dame, where he graduated in 1949, with a bachelor's degree in architecture. While a student at Notre Dame, Jones worked for the noted architectural firm Perkins and Will in nearby Chicago during the summer, later joining that firm upon graduation.

After two years at Perkins and Will, Jones pursued graduate study in architecture at Illinois Institute of Technology under noted modernist architect Ludwig Mies van der Rohe, "one of the great figures of 20th-century architecture", who led the IIT School of Architecture from 1938 to 1958. After competing his master's degree in 1953, Jones was awarded a Fulbright Scholarship to study architecture in Germany under Egon Eiermann. While in Europe, he designed the modernistic headquarters building for Olivetti in Frankfurt, Germany.

In 1954, Jones returned to Oklahoma where he would complete many of his most notable works. His first design in Tulsa, the Tulsa Civic Center, was a critical success: one German critic declared it among the "top architectural achievements in the world during the past century." Settling in Tulsa, Oklahoma, Jones teamed with Oklahoma modernist architects and brothers David George and Lee Cloyd Murray to form the Murray Jones Murray firm.

Jones' self-designed personal residence in Tulsa attracted international attention after a photograph of the structure by Julius Shulman made the cover of Progressive Architecture (and subsequently other publications in the United States and Europe). He continued to work in a modern international style on numerous structures of varying purpose and scale, from the Tulsa International Airport (1962) to a Catholic church in Oklahoma City, along with numerous residential and commercial structures.

Before retiring from his practice of architecture in 1997, Jones also taught in the architecture and urban design programs at the University of Oklahoma and served as campus planner for the University of Tulsa. He and his wife sold their Tulsa home in 2005, and moved to Santa Fe, New Mexico.

== Works ==
- St. Patrick's Catholic Church, Oklahoma City, Oklahoma
- Robert Lawton Jones Residence, Tulsa, Oklahoma (1959)
- First National Bank Tower, Tulsa, Oklahoma
- Bishop Kelley High School, Tulsa, Oklahoma (1960)
- Cox Business Center, Tulsa, Oklahoma
- Tulsa International Airport
- Tulsa Civic Center
- Center Plaza Apartments, Tulsa Oklahoma
- Chapman Hall School of Nursing at the University of Tulsa
