= Pipe Dreams: Greed, Ego, and the Death of Enron =

2002 book by Robert Bryce

- Author: Robert Bryce
- Language: English
- Subject: Energy
- Publisher: PublicAffairs
- Publication date: 8 October 2002
- Publication place: America
- Pages: 416
- ISBN: 978-1-58648-138-4

Pipe Dreams: Greed, Ego, and the Death of Enron is a book by Robert Bryce and published in 2002 by PublicAffairs with an introduction by Molly Ivins.

== Synopsis ==
In Pipe Dreams, Byrce writes of the rise and fall of Enron, including its ties to the presidential administrations of George W. Bush and Bill Clinton. He also writes of the culture of excessive greed and sexual misconduct within the company's leadership.

== Reception ==
Fran Kelly on her radio national breakfast show for ABC said, "'Greed and sleaze' that best sums-up America's largest corporate collapse. Enron was a breeding ground for some of the worst excesses the business world has seen. It wasn't uncommon for the company's directors to send corporate jets to pick up homesick daughters in Paris, or fly themselves to major sporting events. One Enron division even spent $4 million a year on flowers, alone. But the company's executives weren't only guilty of cheating on their shareholders. Many married staff were permanent fixtures in Houston's countless strip clubs. All this and more is documented in a new book Pipe Dreams: Greed, Ego, and the Death of Enron by Austin-based investigative reporter Robert Bryce."

Andrew Leonard writing for Salon has said, "Bryce recapitulates how the press, the analysts, Enron's board of directors and its shareholders all bought into Enron's vision of itself. There were obvious reasons, as he points out, for the widespread collusion. The analysts worked for companies that also wanted Enron's investment banking business. The directors had companies of their own that were doing deals with Enron. The shareholders loved to see the stock price go up and up, and the business press, well, the business press loves a winner!"

William J. Holstein writing for The New York Times has said, "Mr. Bryce, a writer who lives in Austin, Tex., delves deeply into the long relationship among President Bush, his father, and Kenneth L. Lay, the former chairman and chief executive of Enron, whom the younger Mr. Bush nicknamed, Kenny Boy."

== See also ==
- Power Hungry: The Myths of "Green" Energy and the Real Fuels of the Future
- Gusher of Lies: The Dangerous Delusions of Energy Independence
