= 2017 Uppsala rape =

2017 gang rape in Uppsala, Sweden

On the night of 21 January 2017, in Uppsala, Sweden, a group of three men gang raped a nearly unconscious woman for around three hours and livestreamed the assault on Facebook. The stream was circulated on a closed Facebook group with around 60,000 members. Police were alerted the next morning on 22 January, when one viewer of the Facebook livefeed, who had initially believed the video to be staged, realised what was happening and phoned the police, who arrived at the apartment, where they found one of the men still filming and the woman still present. The case sparked outrage across Sweden and caused controversy about Facebook failing to report the crime and terminate the stream.

== Crime ==
The Local, an English language news website, reported that "the alleged crime took place in an apartment in the city of Uppsala early on Sunday morning. The victim was reportedly close to unconscious." It is alleged that three men entered the 31-year-old woman's apartment the prior night, armed with at least one handgun. The BBC reports that "Josefine Lundgren, 21, called the police when she saw the video. Speaking to Swedish tabloid Expressen, she said she saw one of the men tear the woman's clothes off and lie on top of her. She also said one of the men had a gun." The online newspaper Expressen went on to say that "[p]olice are investigating a case of suspected sexual abuse against a woman who was filmed and sent out live on Facebook on Sunday morning." One of the men admitted to the crime during the video itself.

Shortly after, Facebook took the video down, though there are reportedly still copies of the video being shared. Witnesses stated that there was a second video taken after the assault had occurred, wherein the woman denied that she was raped. Due to the fact that it was filmed by one of her alleged rapists, who openly demeans and belittles her throughout the video, some news outlets point out the possibility that she may have been coerced. In it, the man filming taunted the woman, yet denied having participated in the assault, claiming that the woman had hepatitis C, and attempted to convince her that no sexual assault had taken place at all. He began to mock her as she consulted a friend over the phone about the legal definition of rape, at one point repeatedly saying "Du blev våldtagen. Där fick vi fram svaret!" ("You were raped. There we have the answer!") while laughing, then, addressing the camera, states that he would "fuck her tonight" ("[Jag ska] knulla henne ikväll"), at which point police arrived at the scene.

== Aftermath ==
Two Afghan immigrants with a temporary residency grant, one 18 and one 21 years old, were arrested, and a 24-year-old Swedish citizen was held for failing to report the crime; under Swedish law, their identities could not be released at the time. Foreign media later identified the suspects respectively as Maysam Afshar, Reza Mohammed Ahmadi, and Emil Khodagholi, who was acquainted with the victim beforehand.

At their trial in April 2017, the two younger suspects admitted to having had sex with the woman, but claimed that it had been consensual. Their argument was shot down by the prosecution, as it was reported that the woman was under the effects of alcohol and drugs at the time and therefore could not have given consent. The 18-year-old was sentenced to a year in prison for rape and the 21-year-old was sentenced to 28 months; an appeal by the latter was denied. The 24-year-old, who insisted that he had "only filmed" the crime, was jailed for 6 months on charges of not reporting rape and gross defamation. The presiding judge, Nils Pålbrant, stated that even if the woman had agreed to sex as they claimed, she was in a vulnerable position and hence they would be held guilty of rape. They were also told to pay 335,000 kronor to the victim as compensation.

== See also ==
- Cybersex trafficking
- We Are Sthlm sexual assaults - a series of sexual assaults during a youth music festival in Stockholm, Sweden
