= San Andrés Preparatory School attack =

2024 school attack in Mexico

- Location: San Andrés Preparatory School, Guadalajara, Jalisco, Mexico
- Date: 30 November 2024; 10:47 a.m.
- Attack type: Bludgeoning
- Weapons: Claw hammer; Hatchet (unused); Knife (unused)
- Deaths: 0
- Injuries: 3 (including the perpetrator)
- Perpetrator: Brandon Alonso

On 30 November 2024, a 17-year-old student carried out a school attack at the San Andrés Preparatory School (Spanish: Preparatoria San Andrés) in Guadalajara, Jalisco, Mexico, injuring two classmates with a hammer before being subdued and arrested.

== Attack ==
The perpetrator started a livestream on social media at 10:46 a.m., subtitled "school massacre, enjoy the show". He is shown walking up to a group of students with a hammer in one hand, hatchet in the other, and hitting one of them with a hammer on the back of the head before turning to another one, hitting them in the face. At that point the first student to be struck stands up and grabs the perpetrator from behind by the arms, immobilizing him. The perpetrator was later arrested, whereas both victims were treated at a local hospital.

The stream, which reached 29 thousand views, was taken offline when someone turned the perpetrator's phone off, with the video archive being taken offline shortly after the student's detainment. In his belongings, a knife, a bottle of alcohol and a lighter were also found besides his two main weapons.

== Perpetrator ==
The perpetrator was identified as a 17-year-old male student of the school named Brandon Alonso. (Note: Alonso is his middle name. Given his status as a minor at the moment of the crime, his surnames have not been revealed to the public.) Classmates often described him as a loner, and he hadn't attended classes since the beginning of the school semester in October.

He had a long history of sharing violent messages through Facebook and X (where he only had 14 followers), including showing off the corpse of a mouse he had killed and a selfie taken inside of a burning church, claiming responsibility for the arson attack. He often praised Satanism, Nazism and Adolf Hitler on social media, posing in one photo while doing a Roman salute with the caption "Sieg Heil" and showing off an inverted cross in the background of his profile picture. He had also announced his plans to commit a "massacre" three days prior to the attack. Brandon finally announced his plans on social media at 8:44 a.m., telling his followers to "enjoy the show".

== Aftermath ==
The event was compared to a similar school attack occurred in the same city of Guadalajara 8 months before, also using a hatchet and knives, where the 20-year-old perpetrator killed three people (one before the attack) and injured another using a camping hatchet before being arrested. He later committed suicide while awaiting trial. Both attacks only used melee weapons, both were announced on social media hours before the events, leading to speculation about online groups' influence in their radicalization, along with critique towards the Mexican healthcare system for not giving either perpetrator proper mental health support. Some also compared both attacks to the recurring incidents of school shootings in the United States.

=== Legal process ===
After being arrested, the teenager was charged with qualified injuries, later also being charged with apologia of criminal acts. On 6 December, he was placed under preventive detention for 6 months.

== See also ==
- 2019 Volsk school attack
