= Robert Kerr Goodwin =

Robert "Bob" Kerr Goodwin is an American non-profit executive, political appointee, and publisher who was CEO of Points of Light.

== Early life and education ==
Goodwin was born in Tulsa, Oklahoma in 1948 to E.L. Goodwin, an attorney and a newspaper publisher, and Jeanne Osby Goodwin, a social worker and teacher. After graduating from Bishop Kelley High School, earned his undergraduate degree from Oral Roberts University and his masters in philosophy from San Francisco Theological Seminary.

== Career ==
After earning his graduate degree, Goodwin returned to Tulsa to join the family newspaper, The Oklahoma Eagle, one of the most influential black-owned newspapers in the United States.

=== Government and nonprofit work ===
After years working in media, Goodwin transitioned to working for colleges and universities, taking public affairs and advocacy positions at Prairie View A&M University and Texas A&M University. During the 1988 election, Goodwin led the Democrats for Bush movement. After George H. W. Bush was elected, Goodwin accepted a political appointment to serve in the United States Department of Education, where he led the White House Initiative for Historically Black Colleges. In 1992, he joined the Bush-founded Points of Light Foundation and, in 1995 became its president and CEO.
