= Aleksandr Khant =

Russian film director

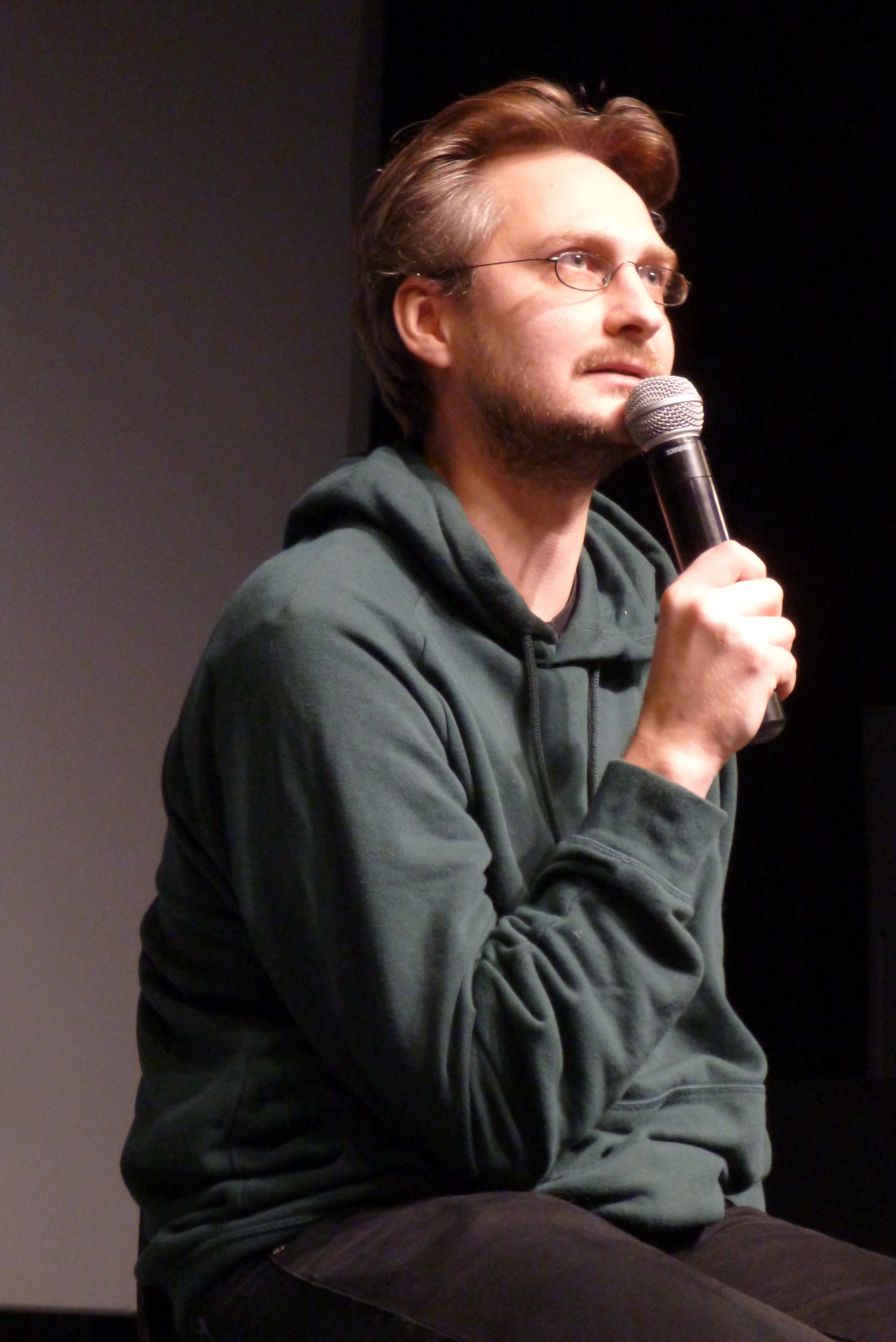
Khant in 2018

Aleksandr Nikolayevich Khant (Russian: Алекса́ндр Влади́мирович Хант; born 3 December 1985) is a Russian film director. After graduating from VGIK in 2012, he released his debut film How Vitka Chesnok Drove Lyokha Shtyr to the House for Disabled in 2017. The film went on to win prizes at film festivals in Karlovy Vary and Vyborg.
