= Philip Venables =

British composer

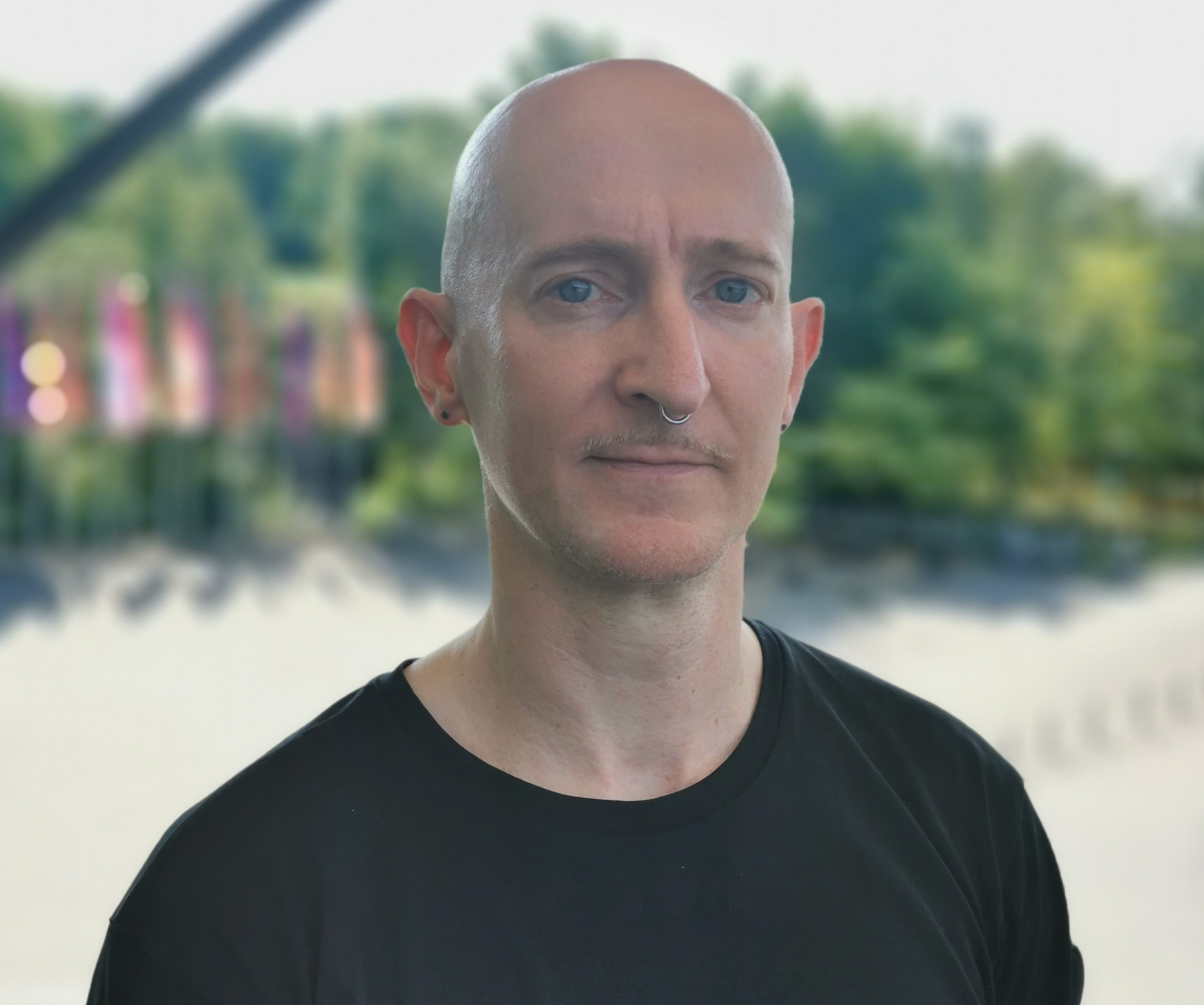
- Philip Venables
- Born: Chester, Cheshire, England, UK
- Occupation: Composer
- Notable work: Operatic adaptation of 4.48 Psychosis (2016); Bound to Hurt (2015); Illusions (2015)
- Website: philipvenables.com

Philip Venables is a British composer known for his operatic and theatrical works.

== Life and career ==
Born in Chester, Venables studied at Jesus College, Cambridge and the Royal Academy of Music, where he studied under Philip Cashian and David Sawer, and was awarded the DipRAM diploma and the Manson Fellowship in Composition.

Venables' orchestral works include Arc, written for the BBC Philharmonic; String Quartet for the Duke Quartet at Wigmore Hall; Hyaline, for the London Symphony Orchestra; and The Revenge of Miguel Cotto for the London Sinfonietta. His operatic and vocal works include In America et ego, performed at the Bregenz Festival; UNLEASHED, for Tête à Tête (opera company): The Opera Festival; va and Thalidomide for the BBC Singers. His artistic collaborations have included Bound to Hurt, with Turner Prize winner Douglas Gordon; and Illusions, with avant-garde cabaret artist David Hoyle.

Venables wrote the 2016 operatic adaptation of 4.48 Psychosis by Sarah Kane for the Royal Opera at the Lyric Hammersmith. Authorised by Kane's estate as the first operatic adaptation of her work, the opera was well received by critics and nominated for the 2017 Olivier Award for Best New Opera Production.

Venables is the Doctoral Composer in Residence at the Royal Opera House and Guildhall School of Music and Drama. In 2016, he became an Associate of the Royal Academy of Music.

Venables received an Ivor Novello Award nomination at The Ivors Classical Awards 2023. Answer Machine Tape, 1987, composed for solo piano with amplification and KeyScanner device, projection and recorded sound, was nominated for Best Small Chamber Composition. In 2024 Venables received a second Ivor Novello Award nomination at The Ivors Classical Awards 2024 for The Faggots and Their Friends Between Revolutions which received its UK premiere at the Manchester International Festival.

Venables is queer and many of his works touch on LGBT culture. He lives in London and Berlin.

== Works ==
This is an incomplete list and may not reflect the entirety of the composer's output.

| Year | Title | Genre | For | Reference |
|---|---|---|---|---|
| 2006 | String Quartet | Ensemble | String quartet | ISMN 979-0-57036-076-5 |
| 2006 | K, prelude to Mozart's Clarinet Quintet, K581 | Ensemble | Clarinet in A and string quartet | ISMN 979-0-57036-079-6 |
| 2006–2011 | Piano Studies (The boy with the moon in his eyes) | Solo | Piano | ISMN 979-0-57036-078-9 |
| 2007 | Thalidomide | Vocal | 24 voices | |
| 2008 | Time Stands Still, after John Dowland | Vocal | Soprano and guitar | ISMN 979-0-57036-162-5 |
| 2008 | ANIMA | Ensemble | 14 players | ISMN 979-0-57036-087-1 |
| 2009 | Fight music | Ensemble | 8 players | ISMN 979-0-57036-094-9 |
| 2009 | Len's music | Ensemble | Solo cello, viola, clarinet, horn | ISMN 979-0-57036-109-0 |
| 2010 | Metamorphoses after Britten | Solo | Any solo wind instrument | ISMN 979-0-57036-226-4 |
| 2010 | I ____ the body electric | Vocal | Male singer and male speaker with piano or another instrument | ISMN 979-0-57036-192-2 |
| 2011 | Flipp | Duo | Two saxophones of the same type | ISMN 979-0-57036-339-1 |
| 2011 | Klaviertrio im Geiste | Ensemble | Piano trio | ISMN 979-0-57036-233-2 |
| 2011 | Fuck Forever | Vocal | Male speaker, piano, cello and woodblock | ISMN 979-0-57036-303-2 |
| 2011 | numbers 76–80 : tristan und isolde | Vocal | 4 voices (SATB) and string quartet | ISMN 979-0-57036-304-9 |
| 2011 | numbers 91–95 | Vocal | Speaker and two tape recorders, harp, flute and woodblock | ISMN 979-0-57036-302-5 |
| 2012 | The Revenge of Miguel Cotto | Vocal | Ensemble, two male vocalists, percussion and tape | |
| 2015 | Illusions | Ensemble | Video playback (projection) and 9 players | |
| 2016 | 4.48 Psychosis | Opera | Orchestra and 6 vocalists | |
| 2019 | Denis & Katya | Opera | 2 singers and chamber orchestra | |
| 2023 | The Faggots and Their Friends Between the Revolutions | Opera | 15 singers and instrumentalists | |
| 2025 | We Are The Lucky Ones (Opera) | Opera | 8 singers and chamber orchestra | |
