= Strugi Krasnye =

Strugi Krasnye Струги Красные
- Work settlement
- Interactive map of Strugi Krasnye
- Location of Strugi Krasnye Strugi Krasnye (Pskov Oblast)
- Coordinates: 58°16′N 29°06′E
- Country: Russia
- Federal subject: Pskov Oblast
- Administrative district: Strugo-Krasnensky District
- Founded: Mid-19th century
- Urban-type settlement status since: December 7, 1958

Population (2010 Census)
  - Total: 8,447
  - Estimate (2021): 4,871 (−42.3%)

Administrative status
  - Capital of: Strugo-Krasnensky District, Strugi Krasnye Urban Settlement

Municipal status
  - Municipal district: Strugo-Krasnensky Municipal District
  - Urban settlement: Strugi Krasnye Urban Settlement
  - Capital of: Strugo-Krasnensky Municipal District, Strugi Krasnye Urban Settlement
- Time zone: UTC+3 (MSK)
- Postal code: 181110
- OKTMO ID: 58656151051

Strugi Krasnye (Russian: Стру́ги Кра́сные) is an urban locality (a work settlement) and the administrative center of Strugo-Krasnensky District of Pskov Oblast, Russia, located 87 kilometers (54 mi) northeast of Pskov. Municipally, it is incorporated as Strugi Krasnye Urban Settlement, the only urban settlement in the district. Population: 8,447 (2010 census); 8,762 (2002 census); 7,067 (1989 Soviet census).

== History ==
Named after a nearby village, the settlement was founded in the mid-19th century as the railway station of Belaya (Бе́лая) during the construction of the railroad. At the time, it belonged to Luzhsky Uyezd of Saint Petersburg Governorate. In 1905, it was renamed Strugi Belye (Стру́ги Бе́лые), after the estate of N. M. Lakhtin. In 1919, Strugi Belye was an arena of important events of the Russian Civil War. Originally, the area east of Lake Peipus was under control of the revolutionary government. On October 4, 1919 the White Army troops of Nikolai Yudenich during an advance captured the station of Strugi Belye. On November 6, 1919, it was given its present name by the order of G. A. Tomchuk, a commander of an armored train, after the village was taken from the White Guard Armies, to avoid connotations with White Army (with krasny meaning red in Russian).

On August 1, 1927, the uyezds were abolished, and Strugo-Krasnensky District was established, with the center in Strugi Krasnye. The governorates were abolished as well, and the district belonged to Luga Okrug of Leningrad Oblast. On July 23, 1930 the okrugs were abolished, and the districts became directly subordinate to the oblast. Between March 22, 1935 and September 19, 1940, Strugo-Krasnensky District was a part of Pskov Okrug of Leningrad Oblast, one of the okrugs formed at the state boundaries of Soviet Union. Between August, 1941, and February, 1944 Strugo-Krasnensky District was occupied by German troops. On August 23, 1944, Strugo-Krasnensky District was transferred to newly established Pskov Oblast. Urban-type settlement status was granted to Strugi Krasnye on December 7, 1958 by the Decision #430 of Pskov Oblast Executive Committee.

== Population ==
1926	1939	1959	1970	1979	1989 Census	2002 Census	2010 Census
1785	5118	4669	6138	6718	7067	8762	8447

== Economy ==
=== Industry ===
A forestry farm is one of the largest industrial enterprises in the settlement. Timber export is well-developed. There is also a sand quarry.

=== Transportation ===
The settlement also serves as a train station of the Warsaw – Saint Petersburg Railway.

Strugi Krasnye is connected by the road with the M20 highway between Saint Petersburg and Pskov.

== Culture and recreation ==
Strugi Krasnye hosts the Strugo-Krasnensky District Museum, the only museum in the district. A museum of local lore operates in the settlement since 1991.

== Sources ==
- Псковское областное Собрание депутатов. Закон №420-оз от 28 февраля 2005 г. «Об установлении границ и статусе вновь образуемых муниципальных образований на территории Псковской области», в ред. Закона №1542-ОЗ от 5 июня 2015 г. «О внесении изменений в Закон Псковской области "Об установлении границ и статусе вновь образуемых муниципальных образований на территории Псковской области"». Вступил в силу со дня официального опубликования. Опубликован: "Псковская правда", №41–43, №44–46, №49–51, 4 марта 2005 г., 5 марта 2005 г., 11 марта 2005 г. (Pskov Oblast Council of Deputies. Law #420-oz of February 28, 2005 On Establishing the Borders and the Status of the Newly Formed Municipal Formations on the Territory of Pskov Oblast, as amended by the Law #1542-OZ of June 5, 2015 On Amending the Law of Pskov Oblast "On Establishing the Borders and the Status of the Newly Formed Municipal Formations on the Territory of Pskov Oblast". Effective as of the official publication date.).
