= Killing of Robert Godwin =

2017 shooting in Cleveland, Ohio, US

Coordinates: 41.5397473°N 81.6247108°W

Killing of Robert Godwin Sr.
- Location: Cleveland, Ohio, U.S. Erie, Pennsylvania, U.S.
- Date: April 16, 2017; 2:01 p.m. (killing of Godwin); April 18, 2017 (suicide of Stephens) (EDT)
- Attack type: Murder-suicide, senicide, shooting
- Weapon: .45 caliber Glock 30S semi-automatic pistol
- Deaths: 2 (Godwin and the perpetrator)
- Victim: Robert Lee Godwin Sr.
- Perpetrator: Steve William Stephens
- Motive: Resentment towards ex-girlfriend
- Charges: Aggravated murder (perpetrator died before being apprehended)

On April 16, 2017, 74-year-old Robert Lee Godwin Sr. was shot and killed while walking in the Glenville neighborhood of Cleveland, Ohio, United States. The perpetrator, 37-year-old Steve William Stephens, posted a cellphone video of the shooting on his Facebook account, leading many media outlets, both during the manhunt and afterward, to dub Stephens the "Facebook killer". An arrest warrant was issued for Stephens for aggravated murder. Two days later, he died by a self-inflicted gunshot wound when cornered by police in Erie County, Pennsylvania.

== Killing ==
The shooting happened at around 2:00 p.m. EDT on April 16, 2017 (Easter Sunday), in the 600 block of East 93rd Street in Cleveland's Glenville neighborhood. Godwin, while walking around the streets, was carrying a bag to collect littered cans. Stephens uploaded a video of the event. Seconds before the shooting, Stephens exited his car, approached the victim and then asked Godwin to "say Joy Lane", the name of his long term girlfriend who had recently broke up with him. Stephens then said "She's the reason why this is about to happen to you", before fatally shooting Godwin in the head. Facebook said the video was uploaded to the website after the fact, not livestreamed as initially reported. In other Facebook posts, Stephens claimed responsibility for 13 murders, but police said they were not aware of any other victims.

== Manhunt ==
A search for Stephens began soon after the shooting, prompting lockdowns at a number of locations, including Cleveland State University. Cleveland Police Chief Calvin Williams told reporters that detectives talked with Stephens by cellphone shortly after the shooting, but had no further contact with him since that time. The manhunt expanded to other states on the morning of April 17. Residents in Pennsylvania, New York, Indiana, and Michigan were asked to be on alert, and a US$50,000 reward was offered for information leading to Stephens' arrest on a charge of aggravated murder. The FBI also aided the Cleveland Police Department.

At 11:10 a.m. on April 18, Stephens pulled into the drive-through lane of a McDonald's restaurant in Harborcreek Township, Erie County, Pennsylvania, 100 miles (160 km) from the location of the shooting. An employee recognized Stephens from news reports and, after verifying with fellow employees, provided Stephens with part of his order, but stalled him by stating that his fries were still cooking. During this time police were called to the restaurant. Stephens, wary, left without his fries.

As Stephens pulled out of the restaurant, state police gave chase heading westbound through Wesleyville, Pennsylvania. Stephens made it to the corner of Buffalo Road and Downing Avenue in the city of Erie, where Pennsylvania State Police successfully executed a tactical maneuver to bring the car to a stop. As police approached Stephens' car, he shot himself in the head, killing himself instantly.

== Perpetrator ==
Steve William Stephens (December 10, 1979 - April 18, 2017) worked as a vocational specialist at Beech Brook, a behavioral health agency for children and families. He was wearing his work ID badge and repeatedly mentioned Beech Brook in multiple videos on the day of the murder. Police confirmed there was no known connection between Godwin and Stephens prior to the shooting and that Godwin was selected at random. Stephens' mother was quoted as having told authorities that Stephens told her by phone he was "shooting people" because he was "mad with his girlfriend" of about three years, who was confirmed to be safe and was cooperating with investigators at the time.

== Criticism of Facebook ==
The graphic video of Godwin's killing remained accessible to the public on Stephens' Facebook page for more than two hours on April 16 before it was removed by Facebook, according to a timeline shared by the company. The delay generated renewed criticism of Facebook over its handling of offensive content and, in particular, public posts of video and other content related to violent crimes. "We have a lot of work [to do], and we will keep doing all we can to prevent tragedies like this from happening", Facebook CEO Mark Zuckerberg said in his April 18 keynote address at F8, Facebook's annual developers' conference. "Our hearts go out to the family and friends of Robert Godwin Sr.," Zuckerberg added.

On May 3, 2017, Facebook announced that it was adding additional personnel to its "global community operations" team to proactively screen Facebook Live content for violent and other inappropriate content. The new reviewers "will also help us get better at removing things we don't allow on Facebook like hate speech and child exploitation", Zuckerberg said.

== Tributes ==
On September 2, 2017, a section of East 146th Street, between St. Clair Avenue and Aspinwall Avenue, in Cleveland (where Godwin lived most of his adult life) was renamed "Robert Godwin Sr. Way" as a posthumous honor of his life and legacy in the neighborhood.
