= Robert Bryce (writer) =

American journalist

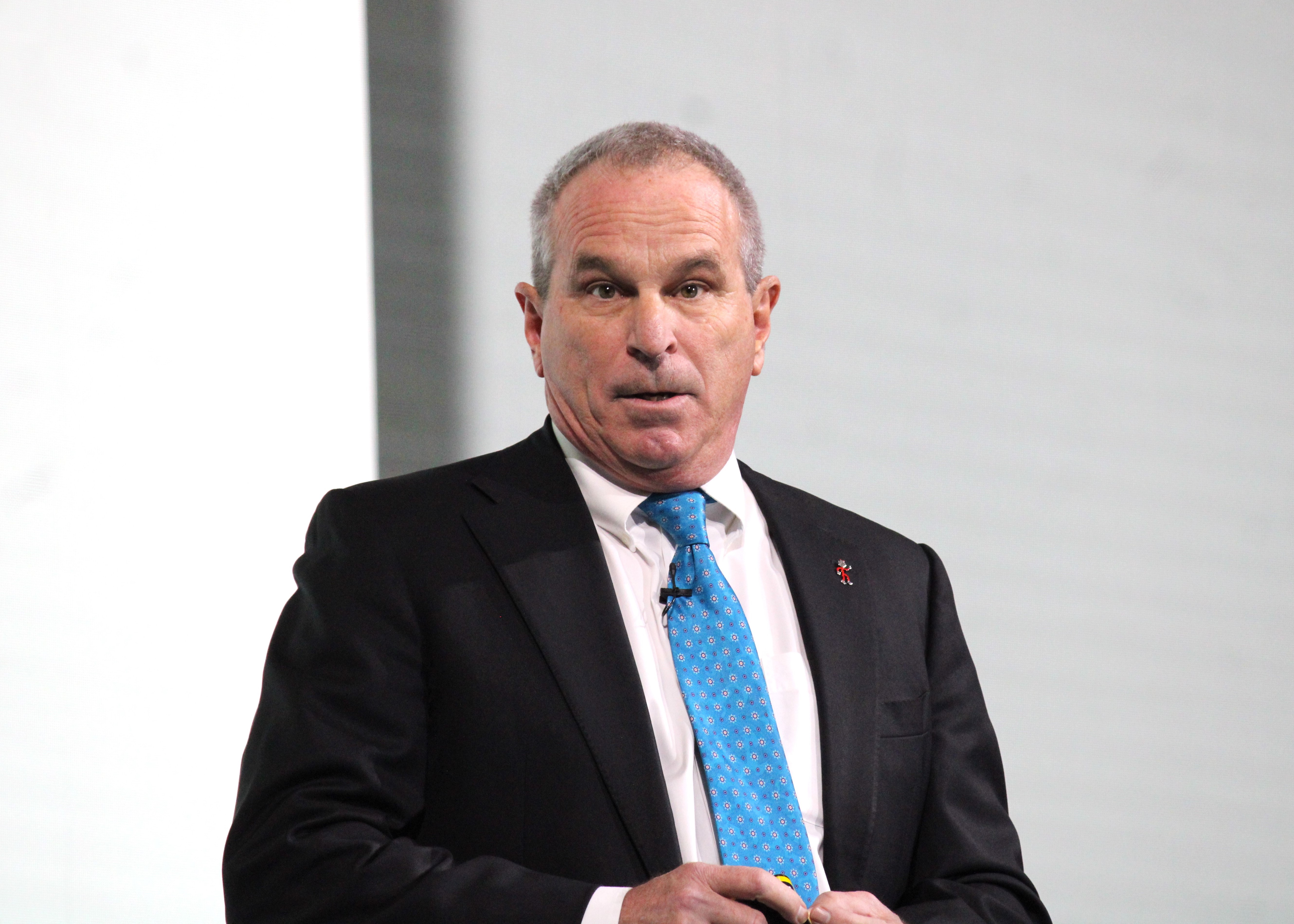
- Bryce in 2025
- Born: 1960 (age 65–66)
- Education: University of Texas (B.F.A.)
- Occupations: Author, journalist, film producer, public speaker
- Website: robertbryce.com

Robert Bryce (born 1960) is an American author, film producer, and public speaker who lives in Austin, Texas. His articles on energy, politics, and other topics have appeared in numerous publications, including The New York Times, The Washington Post, The Wall Street Journal, Forbes, Real Clear Energy, CounterPunch and National Review. He is also the author of six books.

== Career ==
Bryce has been writing about the energy business for three decades. He spent twelve years writing for The Austin Chronicle. From 2006 to 2010, he was the managing editor of the online magazine Energy Tribune. From October 2007 to February 2008 he was a fellow at the Institute for Energy Research, an organization founded by Charles Koch and funded by the fossil fuel industry. From 2010 to 2019 he was a Senior Fellow at the Manhattan Institute, a conservative think tank.

His articles have appeared in dozens of publications, including The Wall Street Journal, The New York Times, The Washington Post, The Hill, and The Guardian. Bryce has also appeared on multiple media outlets ranging from Fox News to al-Jazeera. Bryce is the executive producer of the 2019 feature-length documentary film Juice: How Electricity Explains the World,, He is also the co-producer of the five-part docuseries Juice: Power, Politics & The Grid, which has been viewed more than three million times on YouTube. Bryce has testified before the U.S. Congress seven times, and his books and articles have been translated into six languages.

== Other works ==
=== Writing on the energy industry and species protection ===
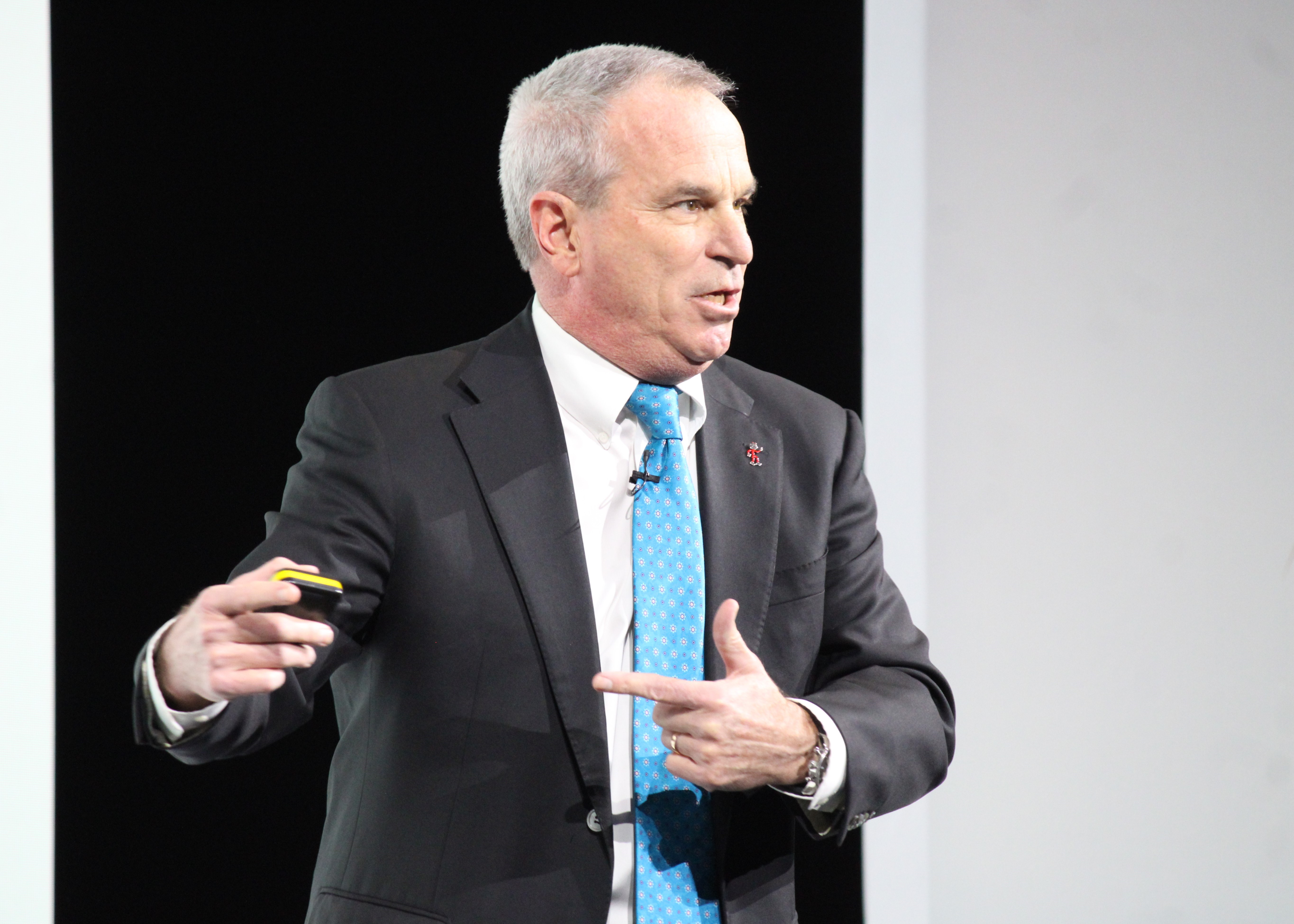
Bryce speaking at the Alliance for Responsible Citizenship, London, 2025

Bryce has written frequently about what he considers the infeasibility of the United States becoming energy independent.

In March 2009, he testified before the Senate Committee on Energy and Natural Resources, saying "no matter how you do the calculations, renewable energy by itself, can not, will not, be able to replace hydrocarbons over the next two to three decades, and that's a conservative estimate".

In a The Wall Street Journal opinion piece in March 2009 he denounced the energy policies of former United States President George W. Bush and then-president Barack Obama, claiming their rush for renewable energy will not be sufficient to cover the country's future energy needs.

Bryce has criticized special exceptions to wildlife protection laws given to renewable energy facilities in the United States, claiming that oil producers and electric utilities have repeatedly been charged and fined under the Migratory Bird Treaty Act for killing birds but wind-power companies are not.

In June 2010, in an article for Slate he expressed dismay at the corn ethanol industry's attempts to use the blowout of the Macondo well in the Gulf of Mexico as a basis to pursue more subsidies.

Bryce is an advocate for increased shale gas consumption in the US. In a June 13, 2011 piece published in the Wall Street Journal he posited that the "shale revolution now underway is the best news for North American energy since the discovery of the East Texas Field in 1930."

Bryce opposes federal corn subsidies for ethanol, citing high costs.

He has argued that electric vehicles have failed to date due to the lack of energy density in batteries, safety concerns, and relatively few sales.

==== N2N ====
In 2013, Bryce argued that renewable energy remains unready to meet real-world energy needs at a scale that can save the climate., and favors "N2N" (natural gas to nuclear), as the logical way forward for energy policy and insurance against the potential risk of climate change.

==== Carbon capture and sequestration ====
In May 2010, he published an op-ed in The New York Times that underscored the difficulties associated with large-scale carbon capture and sequestration. In 2013 he extended this line of argument in National Review Online

=== Writings on politics and current events ===
==== George W. Bush ====
In 1993, Bryce wrote a piece for the Christian Science Monitor about George W. Bush's jump into the Texas gubernatorial race arguing that Bush would "pose a formidable challenge" to then Democratic Governor Ann Richards. Bryce also referred to Karl Rove as a "savvy political consultant."

Bryce predicted that Bush would win the White House in a 1999 piece for The Austin Chronicle, and was the first journalist to report on how Bush's ownership of the Texas Rangers would become a financial asset.

Bryce also analyzed how Bush and his partners used the power of eminent domain to profit off of land they did not own.

==== "I am Sullied-No More" ====
In 2007, Bryce featured 44-year-old Colonel Theodore S. Westhusing's suicide note in an article for the Texas Observer titled, "I am Sullied-No More." In it he argues that Westhusing chose death over dishonor while faced with the Iraq war's corruption.

==== Funeral industry ====
In 1999, Bryce wrote about corruption in the funeral industry, reporting on how Robert Waltrip, CEO of the world's largest death-care company, Service Corporation International, "used the [Texas] governor's office and a state senator in an effort to crush an investigation into S.C.I.'s operations."

==== V-22 Tiltrotor ====
Bryce has been an outspoken critic of the troubled V-22 tiltrotor, or Osprey, aircraft for its safety and cost record.

== Published books ==
- A Question of Power: Electricity and the Wealth of Nations. PublicAffairs. 2020. p. 352. ISBN 978-1610397490.
- Smaller Faster Lighter Denser Cheaper: How Innovation Keeps Proving the Catastrophists Wrong. PublicAffairs. 2014. p. 400. ISBN 978-1610392051.
- Power Hungry: The Myths of "Green" Energy and the Real Fuels of the Future, published 2010 by PublicAffairs, ISBN 978-1-58648-789-8
- Gusher of Lies: The Dangerous Delusions of Energy Independence, published by PublicAffairs 2008, ISBN 978-1-58648-321-0
- Cronies: Oil, the Bushes, and the rise of Texas, America's Superstate, published by PublicAffairs in 2004, ISBN 978-1-58648-188-9.
- Pipe Dreams: Greed, Ego, and the Death of Enron, published by PublicAffairs in 2002, ISBN 978-1-58648-201-5.
