= Beltrán =

Beltrán is a Spanish-Italian surname (or given male name) of initially Italian origin (Beltrami) with the first record of the surname found at the University of Bologna. Centuries later, the surname primarily came to be found in the Catalan-speaking region of eastern Spain and southern France. It shares the same Germanic origin with Bertrand (French) and Bertram (German), ultimately deriving from the Germanic words berht ("bright") and hramn ("raven").. In non-Spanish speaking countries, the accent is usually omitted as Beltran.

== Given name ==
- Prince Beltran of Bulgaria, the second son of Kardam of Saxe-Coburg and grandson of Simeon II of Bulgaria
- Beltrán Osorio, Spanish aristocrat and jockey known as the "Iron Duke" of Alburquerque
- Beltrán de la Cueva, Spanish nobleman, suspected to be the father of Joanna "la Beltraneja", daughter of Henry IV of Castille
- Beltrán Pérez, Dominican baseball pitcher

== Surname ==
- Alfredo Beltrán Leyva (born 1971), Mexican drug lord
- Álvaro Beltrán (born 1978), Mexican racquetball player
- Carlos Beltrán (born 1977), Puerto Rican baseball outfielder
- Carlos Beltrán (musician) (born 1957), Mexican multi-keyboard player
- Crispin Beltran (1933–2008), Filipino politician and labour organizer
- Daima Beltrán (born 1972), Cuban judoka
- Dámaso Beltrán, the namesake of Beltrán, Santiago del Estero, in Argentina
- Eusebius J. Beltran (1934–2025), American Catholic bishop
- Francis Beltrán (born 1979), Dominican baseball pitcher
- Ileana Beltrán (born 1971), Cuban judoka
- Joaquín Beltrán (born 1977), Mexican football defender
- Joey Beltran (born 1981), American mixed martial artist
- José Miguel Arenas Beltrán, or Valtònyc (born 1993), Spanish rapper
- Lola Beltrán (1932–1996), Mexican actress and singer
- Lucas Beltrán (born 2001), Argentine footballer
- Luis Beltrán (1526–1581), Valencian priest, patron saint of Colombia
- Luis Beltrán (1784–1827), the namesake of Luis Beltrán, Río Negro and Fray Luis Beltrán, Santa Fe, in Argentina
- Manuel Beltrán (born 1971), Spanish road cyclist
- Manuela Beltrán (fl. 1780), Colombian woman who organized a peasant revolt against excess taxation
- María Beltrán (born 1956), Cuban javelin thrower
- Mike Beltran (born 1984), Florida State Representative and Litigator
- Monica Beltran (born 1985), U.S. soldier
- Morena Beltrán (born 1999), Argentine TV host and journalist
- Nelly Beltrán (1925–2007), Argentine actress
- Perla Beltrán (born 1986), Mexican beauty queen
- Robert Beltran (born 1953), Mexican American actor
- Santiago Beltrán (born 2004), Argentine football player
- Sister Sponsa Beltran (1925–2016), American nun
- Tito Beltrán (born 1965), Chilean tenor
- Yurizan Beltran (1986–2017), American pornographic actress
