= Beltrán (disambiguation) =

Beltrán is a Spanish-Italian surname and given male name.

Beltrán may also refer to:

- Beltrán, Santiago del Estero, a municipality in Argentina
- Luis Beltrán, Río Negro, a municipality in Argentina
- Fray Luis Beltrán, Santa Fe, a town in Argentina
- Beltran (volcano), or Cerro Beltrán, a volcano in Argentina
- Beltrán, Cundinamarca, a town in Colombia

== See also ==
- Beltran (disambiguation)
