= Eugene J. McGuinness =

American Catholic prelate (1889–1957)

His Excellency, The Most Reverend Eugene Joseph McGuinness
- Bishop of Oklahoma City-Tulsa
- Church: Catholic Church; Latin Church
- Diocese: Oklahoma City
- Installed: February 1, 1948
- Term ended: December 27, 1957
- Predecessor: Francis C. Kelley
- Successor: Victor J. Reed
- Previous posts: Bishop of Raleigh (1938 to 1944); Coadjutor Bishop of Oklahoma City-Tulsa (1945 to 1948); Titular Bishop of Ilium (1944 to 1948)

Orders
- Ordination: May 22, 1915 by Edmond Francis Prendergast
- Consecration: December 21, 1937 by Dennis Joseph Dougherty

Personal details
- Born: September 6, 1889 Hellertown, Pennsylvania, U.S.
- Died: December 27, 1957 (aged 68)
- Education: St. Charles Borromeo Seminary; University of Santo Tomas
- Motto: Omnia omnibus (All things to all men)

Styles of Eugene McGuinness
- Reference style: The Most Reverend
- Spoken style: Your Excellency
- Religious style: Monsignor
- Posthumous style: none

Eugene Joseph McGuinness (September 6, 1889 – December 27, 1957) was an American prelate of the Catholic Church. He served as bishop of the Diocese of Raleigh in North Carolina (1937–1944) and as bishop of the Diocese of Oklahoma City-Tulsa in Oklahoma (1948–1957).

== Biography ==
=== Early life ===
Eugene McGuinness was born on September 6, 1889, in Hellertown, Pennsylvania, to Daniel and Mary (née Flood) McGuinness. He received his early education at the parochial school of Holy Infancy Parish in Bethlehem, Pennsylvania. He attended St. Charles Borromeo Seminary in Philadelphia, Pennsylvania, then earned Doctor of Both Laws and Doctor of Sacred Theology degrees from the University of Santo Tomas in Manila, Philippines.

=== Priesthood ===
McGuinness was ordained to the priesthood for the Archdiocese of Philadelphia by Archbishop Edmond Prendergast on May 22, 1915. Over the next several years, McGuinness then served as a curate at St. Paul's Parish, St. Agatha's Parish, St. John's Parish, and at the Cathedral of SS. Peter and Paul, all in Philadelphia.

McGuinness was named assistant director of the local Society for the Propagation of the Faith, then as field secretary in 1919. He was name a vice-president in 1920 of the national Catholic Church Extension Society. McGuinness served as executive secretary of the American Board of Catholic Missions from 1923 to 1937, and was named a domestic prelate by the Vatican in 1929.

=== Bishop of Raleigh ===
On October 13, 1937, McGuinness was appointed bishop of Raleigh by Pope Pius XI. He received his episcopal consecration on December 21, 1937, from Cardinal Dennis Dougherty, with bishops William O'Brien and Hugh L. Lamb serving as co-consecrators.

=== Coadjutor Bishop and Bishop of Oklahoma City ===
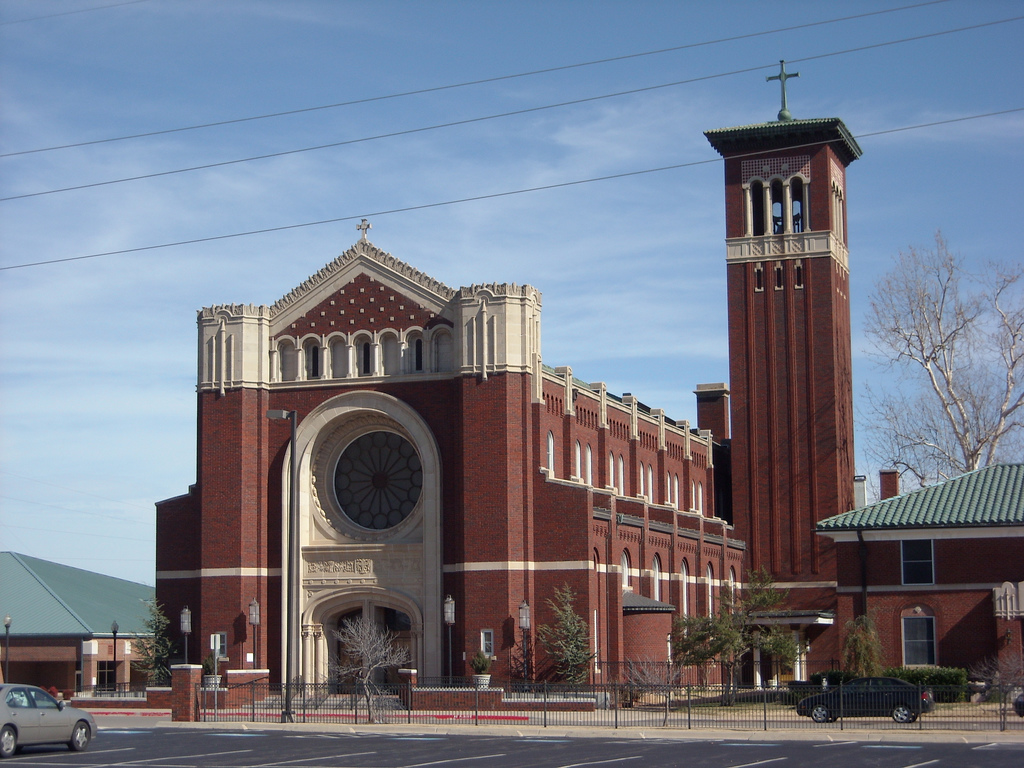
Cathedral of Our Lady of Perpetual Help, Oklahoma City, Oklahoma (2008)

McGuinness was appointed coadjutor bishop of Oklahoma City-Tulsa and titular bishop of Ilium on November 11, 1944, by Pope Pius XII. After the death of Bishop Francis Kelley on February 1, 1948, McGuinness automatically succeeded him as the third bishop of Oklahoma City-Tulsa.

During his nine-year administration, McGuinness saw the Catholic population in the state grow by almost 40 percent and received 1,242 adult converts in 1957 alone. He made trips to Ireland and Poland to recruit clergy.

=== Death and legacy ===
Eugene McGuinness died on December 27, 1957, at age 68.

== See also ==
- Catholic Church in the United States
- Hierarchy of the Catholic Church
- Historical list of the Catholic bishops of the United States
- List of Catholic bishops in the United States
- Lists of popes, patriarchs, primates, archbishops, and bishops

Catholic Church titles
Preceded by Francis Clement Kelley	Bishop of Oklahoma City-Tulsa; 1945–1957	Succeeded by Victor Joseph Reed
Preceded by William Joseph Hafey	Bishop of Raleigh; 1938–1944	Succeeded by Vincent Stanislaus Waters
