= Victor Joseph Reed =

American clergyman

Most Reverend Victor J. Reed
- Bishop of Oklahoma City-Tulsa
- Church: Roman Catholic Church
- See: Oklahoma
- In office: January 21, 1958—September 7, 1971
- Predecessor: Eugene J. McGuinness
- Successor: John R. Quinn
- Previous post: Auxiliary Bishop of Oklahoma City-Tulsa (1957-1958)

Orders
- Ordination: December 21, 1929
- Consecration: March 5, 1958

Personal details
- Born: December 23, 1905 Montpelier, Indiana
- Died: September 8, 1971 (aged 65) Oklahoma City, Oklahoma, United States

Victor Joseph Reed (December 23, 1905 – September 7, 1971) was an American clergyman of the Roman Catholic Church. He served as Bishop of Oklahoma City-Tulsa from 1958 until his death in 1971.

== Early life and education ==
Styles of Theophile Meerschaert
- Reference style: The Most Reverend
- Spoken style: Your Excellency
- Religious style: Monsignor
- Posthumous style: none

Victor Reed was born in Montpelier, Indiana, to Victor Larue and Henrietta Mary (née Collins) Reed. His father, a Protestant who moved to Indiana from Pennsylvania, worked in the oil industry and converted to Catholicism shortly before his marriage. His mother was born in Canada to Irish immigrants from County Clare. The eldest of five children, he had one sister, Mary Veronica; and three brothers, Collins Gerard, John Joseph, and Paul Joseph. In 1910, Reed and his family moved to Bald Hill, Oklahoma, on account of his father's work. They later moved to Mounds in 1912. That same year, at age seven, Reed entered St. Joseph's College in Muskogee, a boys' high school run by the Brothers of the Sacred Heart.

Following his graduation from St. Joseph's in 1924, Reed began his studies for the priesthood at St. John's Seminary in Little Rock, Arkansas. In an interview in 1963, he said, "Frankly, I had never considered any other career [than the priesthood]. I wanted to be a priest from as far back as I can remember, and that was when I was about 10 years old." In 1928, he was sent by Bishop Francis Kelley to continue his theological studies at the Pontifical North American College in Rome. He earned a Doctor of Sacred Theology degree from the Urban College of Propaganda in 1929.

== Priesthood ==
While in Rome, Reed was ordained a priest for the Diocese of Oklahoma City on December 21, 1929. Following his return to Oklahoma in 1930, he served as a curate at St. Joseph's Cathedral in Oklahoma City for five years. During this period, he was named censor of Little Flower Magazine, published by the Carmelite Fathers, in 1932. In 1935, he went to further his studies at the Catholic University of Leuven in Belgium.

After earning his Ph.D. from Leuven in 1939, he declined a teaching position at the Catholic University of America in Washington, D.C. to return to Oklahoma. Upon his return, Reed became assistant chancellor of the Diocese of Oklahoma City and pastor of St. Francis Xavier Church in Stillwater. He was named rector of Holy Family Cathedral in Tulsa in 1947. He was made a papal chamberlain in 1949, and raised to the rank of domestic prelate in 1953.

== Episcopacy ==
On December 5, 1957, Reed was appointed Auxiliary Bishop of Oklahoma City-Tulsa and Titular Bishop of Limisa by Pope Pius XII. However, before his consecration took place, Bishop Eugene J. McGuinness died and Reed was named to succeed him as the fourth Bishop of Oklahoma City-Tulsa on January 21, 1958. He was consecrated on the following March 5 by Archbishop Amleto Giovanni Cicognani, with Bishops Jeremiah Francis Minihan and Stephen Aloysius Leven serving as co-consecrators, at Holy Family Cathedral.

Reed's 13-year-long administration was a period of transition and turmoil for the diocese. Between 1962 and 1965, he attended all four sessions of the Second Vatican Council. He associated himself with the progressive wing of bishops at the Council, lending his support to the use of vernacular in the Mass and to an emphasis of pastoral over administrative skills in bishops. When he returned to Oklahoma, his attempts to implement the Council's reforms were met with both support and opposition. In 1966, Traditionalist Catholics picketed his residence and called for his removal, accusing Reed of following "un-Catholic" policies and participating in a "worldwide atheistic conspiracy for world domination" led by communists.

Reed died from a heart attack at age 65.

Bishop Reed had ordained Blessed Stanley Rother, martyred in Guatemala in 1981, to the priesthood.

Catholic Church titles
| Preceded by Eugene J. McGuinness | Bishop of Oklahoma City-Tulsa; 1958–1971 | Succeeded by John R. Quinn |
