= Beltrami =

Beltrami may refer to:

== Places in the United States ==
- Beltrami County, Minnesota
- Beltrami, Minnesota
- Beltrami, Minneapolis, a neighborhood in Minneapolis, Minnesota

== Other uses ==
- Beltrami (surname)
