= Carlos Beltrán (disambiguation) =

Carlos Beltrán (born 1977) is a Puerto Rican baseball player

Carlos Beltrán may refer to:

- Carlos Beltrán (musician) (born 1957), Mexican multi-keyboard player
- Carlos Beltrán Leyva (born 1969), Mexican drug lord
