= Cathedral of Our Lady of Perpetual Help (Oklahoma City) =

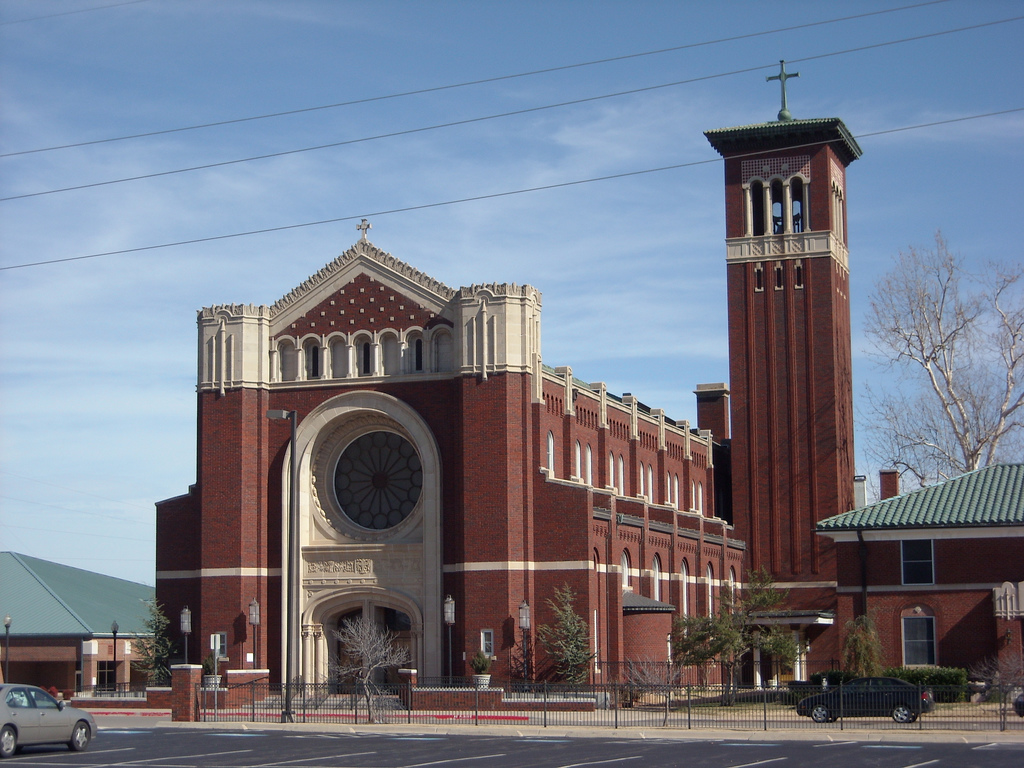

- Location in Oklahoma Cathedral of Our Lady of Perpetual Help (the United States)
- 35°30′10″N 97°31′51″W
- Location: 3214 N. Lake Ave. Oklahoma City, Oklahoma
- Country: United States
- Denomination: Roman Catholic
- Website: cathedralokc.org

History
- Status: Cathedral
- Founded: 1919

Architecture
- Style: Italianate
- Groundbreaking: July 3, 1923
- Completed: February 1924

Specifications
- Materials: Brick

Administration
- Diocese: Archdiocese of Oklahoma City

Clergy
- Archbishop: Most Rev. Paul Coakley
- Rector: Msgr. Richard Stansberry

The Cathedral of Our Lady of Perpetual Help is a Catholic cathedral in Oklahoma City, Oklahoma, in the United States. It is the seat of the Archdiocese of Oklahoma City.

== History ==
=== 1900 to 1930 ===
In January 1919, Bishop Theophile Meerschaert of the Diocese of Oklahoma City assigned Monsignor Albert Monnot to establish Our Lady of Perpetual Help in the northwestern part of Oklahoma City. At its inception, the parish had a membership of 68 families. Monnot celebrated mass in a car showroom before constructing a temporary wooden church in May 1919.

In June 1919, the parish broke ground on a school building. The school opened in September 1919 with 90 students in twelve grades; it served as the parish church for masses.Three Sisters of Mercy, who resided in a frame house across the street, served as faculty. The parish began construction of the new church in July 1923; in September of that year, a tornado twisted all the steel beams for the bell tower. The church was dedicated by Cardinal George Mundelein in February 1924. A frame rectory was completed later that year. A wing was added to the school in 1930.

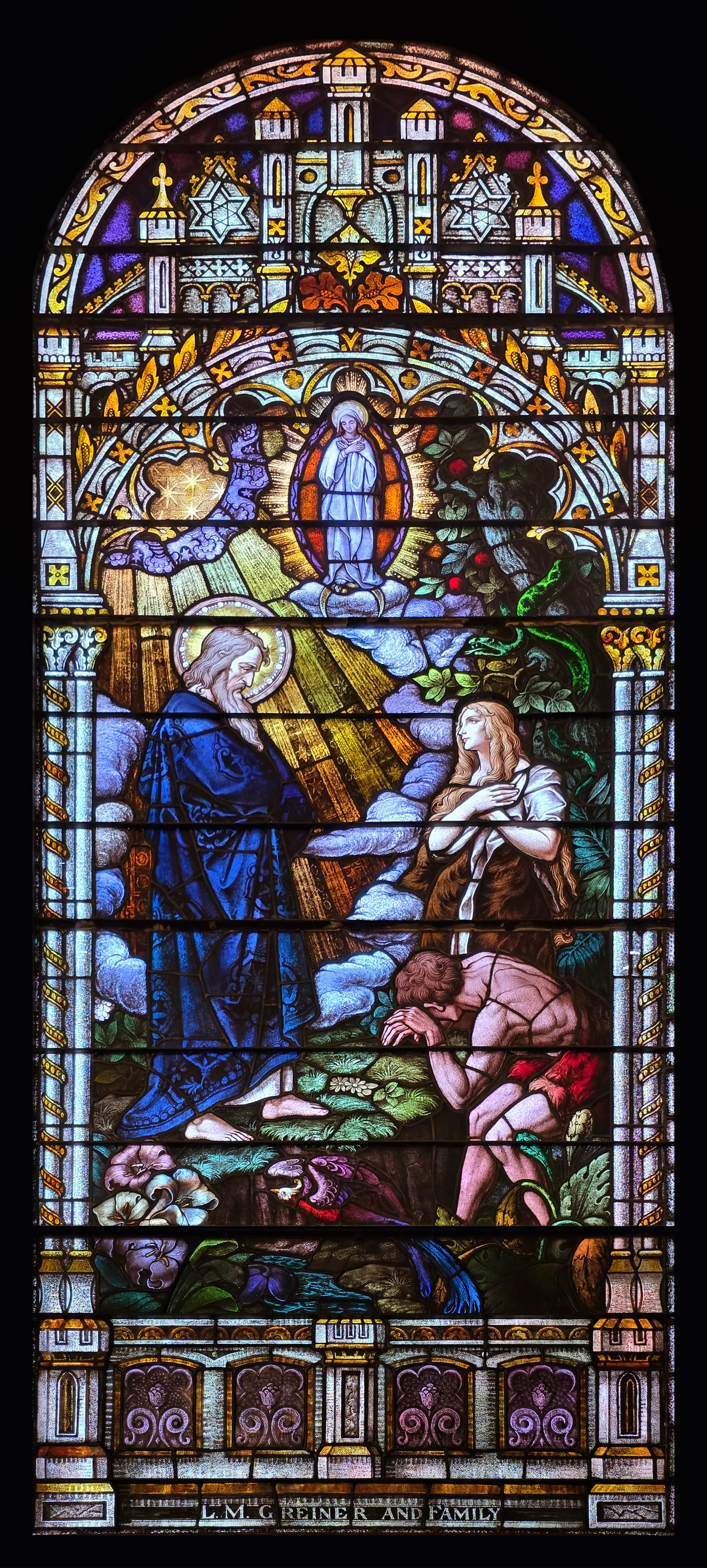
Expulsion from the Garden by Emil Frei

The stained glass windows were designed by Emil Frei of St. Louis, Missouri and installed in 1924.

=== 1930 to 2000 ===
In November 1930, Pope Pius XI suppressed the Diocese of Oklahoma City, replacing it with the Diocese of Oklahoma-Tulsa, reflecting the population growth of Tulsa. At the same time, the pope designated Our Lady of Perpetual Help as the new cathedral in Oklahoma City, replacing St. Joseph Cathedral.The parish in 1932 renamed its school as the John Carroll School. This was in honor of Archbishop John Carroll of Baltimore, the first Catholic bishop in the nation. The parish in 1941 constructed a convent for its teachers from the Sisters of Mercy.

In 1947, after the parish paid off the cathedral debt, Our Lady of Perpetual Help was consecrated. At that time, the parish replaced its main altar with a marble one and installed a wooden baldacchino over the altar.

Pope Paul VI in December 1972 split the Diocese of Oklahoma-Tulsa, erecting the Archdiocese of Oklahoma City and the Diocese of Tulsa.In 1975, 30 Vietnamese refugee families joined the Our Lady Parish. They had fled the former nation of South Vietnam after the end of the Vietnam War.

The parish undertook a renovation project in 1993 that included a new pipe organ by W. Zimmer and Sons of Charlotte, North Carolina, a new baptistery, electrical and other additions to the parish plant. The parish added a gym and classroom building to the John Carroll School.

=== 2000 to present ===
The cathedral underwent another renovation project in 2019, with the installation of a new altar and ambo as well as a reredos to hold the tabernacle. Contractors also marblelized the columns and updated the confessionals and restrooms.

In December 2025, the archdiocese launched a $3.5 million capital campaign to update the Mercy Center, which houses the ministries and parish programs. The plan was to add an elevator and make the building more accessible, add a meeting hall and expand the north wing.

== Past rectors ==
- Most Reverend Edward Weisenburger (2002 – 2012)

== See also ==
- List of Catholic cathedrals in the United States
- List of cathedrals in the United States
