= Lucy Gertrude Clarkin =

Canadian poet (1876–1947)

Lucy Gertrude Clarkin (née Kelley; 1 November 1876 – 3 February 1947) was a Canadian poet from Charlottetown, Prince Edward Island.

== Life ==
Born Lucy Gertrude Kelley on 1 November 1876 in Charlottetown, Prince Edward Island, she was the daughter of John and Mary Ann Kelley. Her brother, Francis Clement Kelley founded the Catholic Extension Society, and became the second Bishop of Oklahoma City. She moved to Michigan as a girl and taught art in parish schools.

She married Patrick William Clarkin, a telegraphist for the Canadian National Railway for 47 years, and returned to Charlottetown. The Clarkin's had four children. She contributed work to a number of Canadian publications, including Canadian Author & Bookman, Canadian Magazine, and The Charlottetown Guardian. She died in Charlottetown on 3 February 1947, aged 70.

== Themes ==
The main theme in much of her work was Catholic piety, as well as "on topics like war, songs, Ireland, Belgium, prayer, peace, family, priesthood, fulfillment, PEI heritage". She published two volumes of poetry, the first in 1923 Way O'Dreams and the second, posthumously, in 1947 Poems, in addition to having her work published in both general and religious journals.

== Publications ==
- Clarkin, L. G. (1922). Way O'Dreams. Charlottetown: Dillon & Coyle.
- Clarkin, L. G. (1947). Poems. Charlottetown P.E.I: Irwin Printing Co.
