= St. Joseph Old Cathedral (Oklahoma City) =

Historic church in Oklahoma, United States

- St. Joseph's Cathedral
- U.S. National Register of Historic Places
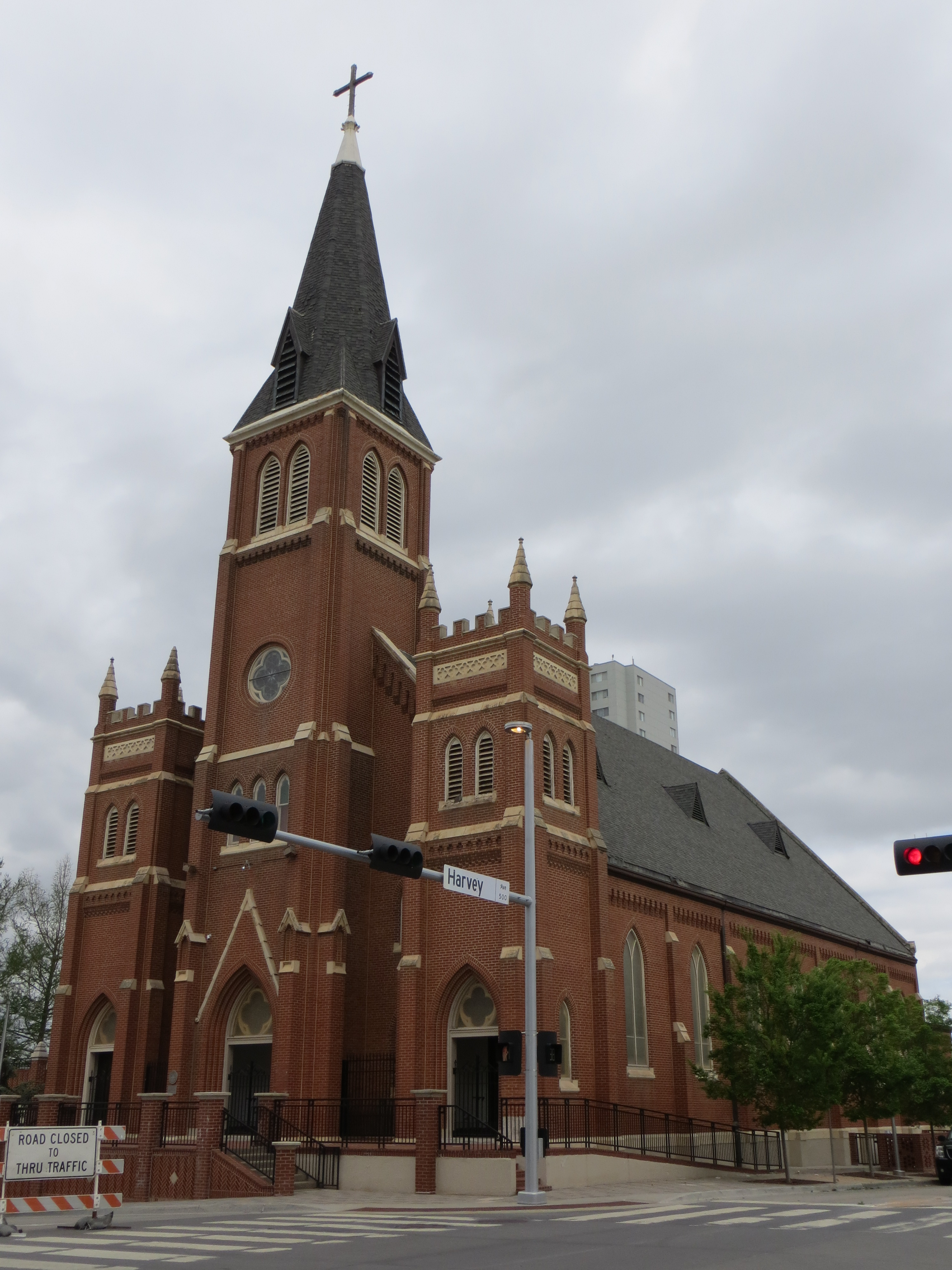

- Location within Oklahoma Location within the United States
- Location: 307 NW 4th St. Oklahoma City, Oklahoma
- Coordinates: 35°28′20″N 97°31′5″W
- Built: 1901-1902
- Architectural style: Gothic Revival
- NRHP reference No.: 78002253
- Added to NRHP: January 30, 1978

St. Joseph Old Cathedral is a parish church of the Roman Catholic Archdiocese of Oklahoma City located in downtown Oklahoma City, Oklahoma, United States. It was the seat of the 'Diocese of Oklahoma City-Tulsa' from 1905 to 1931; and it was listed on the National Register of Historic Places in 1978. The cathedral was severely damaged during the Oklahoma City bombing in 1995.

== History ==
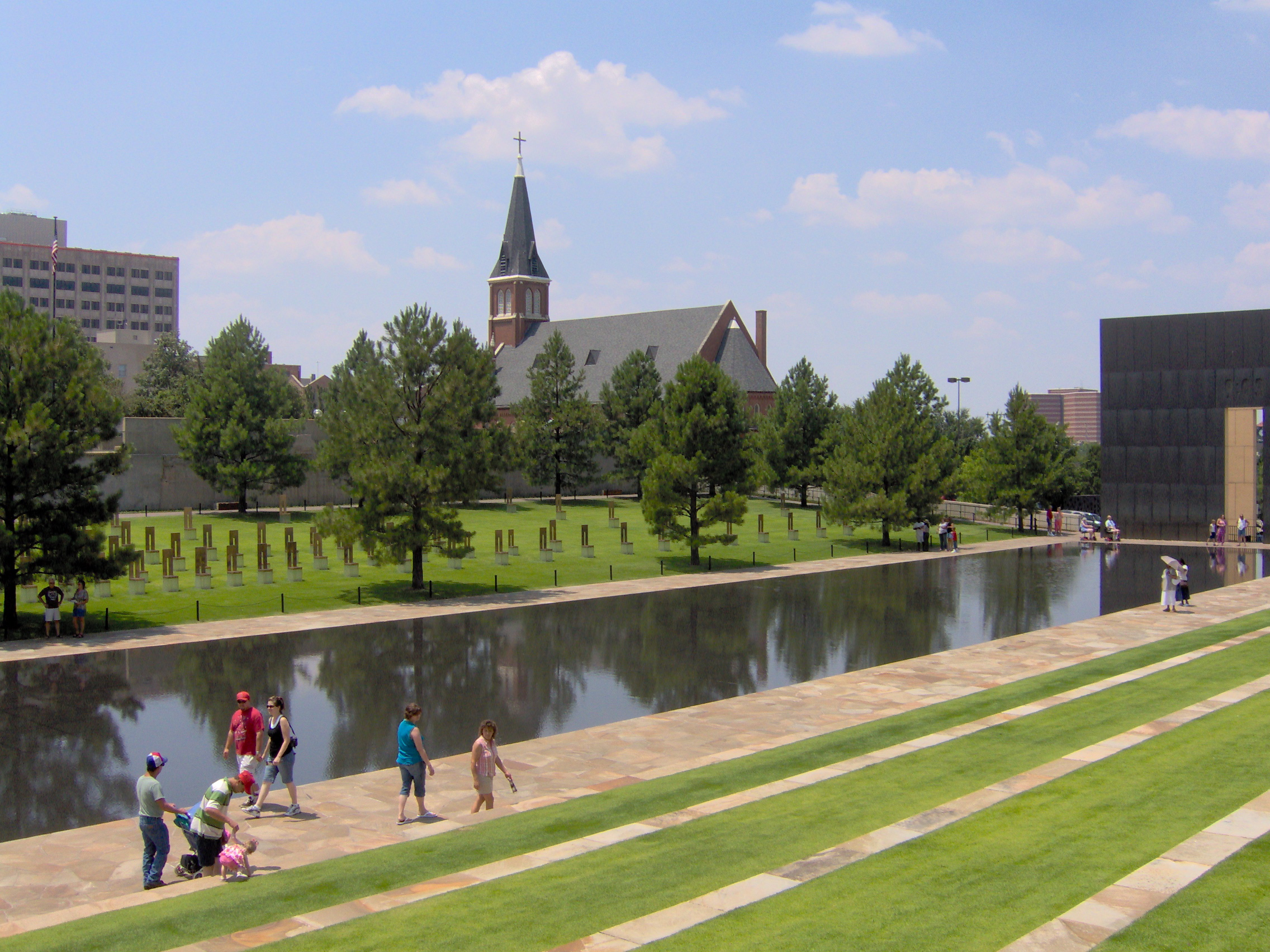
St. Joseph's Old Cathedral, seen from the adjacent Oklahoma City National Memorial.

The Rev. Nicolas F. Scallon arrived in Oklahoma City on April 22, 1889. He was the first priest to serve in the recently formed town. He located other Catholic settlers and looked for a place to celebrate Mass. For the most part in those early days Mass was celebrated in a tent that normally functioned as McGinley's General Store. Less than two weeks later three lots were purchased for $225. Construction on a church building that measured 24 by 40 feet was begun on July 1, 1889, and was completed a month later. A 650-pound bell was purchased for $101 and the first Mass was celebrated in St. Joseph's Church on August 4.

By the turn of the 20th century the congregation began to outgrow its wood-frame building and plans were made for a larger church. Work began on October 19, 1901, and it was finished the following year. It was dedicated by Bishop Theophile Meerschaert of the Vicariate Apostolic of Indian Territory on December 18, 1904. The church was constructed of Coffeyville brick in the Gothic Revival style. It features a central tower with a spire that is flanked by two shorter towers that are crenellated at the top. The building measures 137 by 64 feet.

The year after the church was dedicated St. Pius X established the Diocese of Oklahoma City on August 23, 1905. St. Joseph's became the first cathedral in Oklahoma. It served the diocese as its cathedral until 1931 when Pope Pius XI named Our Lady of Perpetual Help Church as the diocesan cathedral. St. Joseph continued to serve the downtown area as a parish church.

St. Joseph's Old Cathedral was extensively damaged when a bomb exploded at the nearby Alfred P. Murrah Federal Building on April 19, 1995. Most of the stained glass windows on the east side of the church were shattered, and the pipe organ was extensively damaged. The explosion raised the roof several inches off its steel pillars and several of the rafters were broken. Plaster fell from the walls and ceiling and the painted, symbolic plaster medallions were destroyed. The church was closed for nearly two years. A statue carved from Italian marble entitled And Jesus Wept was created to commemorate the event and is adjacent to the Oklahoma City National Memorial. It was dedicated in May 1997 and the church was rededicated on December 1 of the same year.

An interfaith prayer service was held in St. Joseph's on September 12, 2001, in the aftermath of the September 11 attacks on the World Trade Center and the Pentagon. Archbishop Eusebius J. Beltran said during the service, "This building was rebuilt as a sign of faith and remembrance of those people who were killed at the site of the Murrah Bombing. We gather here today to mourn the loss of our brothers and sisters in New York City and in Washington, D.C."

== See also ==
- List of Catholic cathedrals in the United States
- List of cathedrals in the United States
