= Meerschaert =

Meerschaert is a surname of Belgian origin. Notable people with the surname include:

- Gerald Meerschaert (born 1987), American mixed martial artist
- Theophile Meerschaert (1847–1924), Belgian-born Roman Catholic bishop
