= Sooner Catholic =

- Type: Bimonthly newspaper
- Owner: Archdiocese of Oklahoma City
- Publisher: Archbishop Paul Stagg Coakley
- Headquarters: Oklahoma City, Oklahoma, United States
- Price: $20 for non-members
- Website: Sooner Catholic Online

The Sooner Catholic is a bi-monthly newspaper (except in July and December) published by the Archdiocese of Oklahoma City. (The Sooner Catholic Online is the web-based version of the newspaper.) There is no subscription charge for Catholics in Oklahoma who request the newspaper; a subscription rate of $20 a year is requested for those persons who are not members of the Archdiocese of Oklahoma City. The current publisher of the newspaper is Paul Stagg Coakley, archbishop of Oklahoma City.

== See also ==
- Eastern Oklahoma Catholic (newspaper of the Diocese of Tulsa)
