= William David O'Brien =

American prelate

His Excellency, The Most Reverend William David O'Brien
- Titular Archbishop of Calynda; Auxiliary Bishop of Chicago
- See: Chicago
- Installed: April 25, 1934
- Term ended: February 19, 1962

Orders
- Ordination: July 11, 1903 by James Edward Quigley
- Consecration: April 25, 1934 by George Mundelein

Personal details
- Born: August 3, 1878 Chicago, Illinois, US
- Died: February 19, 1962 (aged 83) San Pierre, Indiana, US
- Denomination: Roman Catholic Church
- Education: St. Vincent's College; Kenrick Seminary
- Motto: Magnificat Dominum (Magnificent Lord)

William David O'Brien (August 3, 1878 – February 19, 1962) was an American prelate of the Roman Catholic Church in the United States. He served as an auxiliary bishop of the Archdiocese of Chicago in Illinois from 1934 until his death in 1962, and was named an archbishop in 1953.

== Early life and education ==
William O'Brien was born on August 3, 1878 in Chicago, Illinois, to Charles D. and Alice M. (née O'Hara) O'Brien. He received his early education at John H. Kinzie Elementary School, then attended the Holy Name Cathedral Preparatory High School, both in Chicago.

O'Brien then entered St. Vincent's College in Chicago, graduating in 1899. Deciding to become a priest, he went to St. Louis, Missouri, to study at the Kenrick Seminary

== Priesthood ==
O'Brien was ordained a priest for the Archdiocese of Chicago by Archbishop James Edward Quigley on July 11, 1903. After his ordination, the archdiocese assigned O'Brien as curate at St. Basil's Parish in Chicago. In 1907, Monsignor Francis Kelley, director of the Catholic Church Extension Society, appointed O'Brien as his assistant. While still working for the Extension Society, O'Brien was named as pastor of St. John's Parish in Chicago in 1924. The Vatican elevated O'Brien to the rank of papal chamberlain that same year.

With the departure of Kelley in 1925, O'Brien succeeded him as president of the Extension Society. He also served as editor of the monthly Extension Magazine. In 1926, the Vatican named O'Brien as a domestic prelate. In 1927, O'Brien attended an event sponsored by the Fascist Government of Italy. He was dressed in bishop's vestments for the occasion. During the playing of the Giovinezza, the Italian Fascist anthem, O'Brien gave a roman salute, another trademark of fascism.

== Auxiliary Bishop of Chicago ==
On February 10, 1934, O'Brien was appointed auxiliary bishop of Chicago and titular bishop of Calynda by Pope Pius XI. He received his episcopal consecration on April 25, 1934, from Cardinal George Mundelein, with Bishops Joseph Patrick Lynch and Bernard James Sheil, at Holy Name Cathedral.

As an auxiliary bishop, he continued to serve as president of the Extension Society and pastor of St. John's Parish. In 1940, during World War II, the Italian Government gave O'Brien the Commander of the Order of the Crown Award. O'Brien was named an assistant at the pontifical throne in 1947.

== Titular Bishop of Calynda ==
On November 18, 1953, O'Brien was elevated to the rank of titular archbishop of Calynda by Pope Pius XII. L'Osservatore Romano reported that his elevation was due to his "tireless work" with the Extension Society. He was the first bishop in the United States who was not the head of a diocese to be named an archbishop.

O'Brien was unanimously re-elected president of the Extension Society in 1954. In his later years, he relinquished the editorship of the Extension Magazine and delegated many of his administrative duties, but still closely following the society's activities and frequently visiting its headquarters.

O'Brien died on February 19, 1962, at Little Company of Mary Hospital in San Pierre, Indiana, at age 83.
