= Catholic Extension =

American nonprofit fundraising organization

- Formation: October 18, 1905 (121 years ago)
- Purpose: Supports poor mission dioceses across the United States
- Location: Chicago, Illinois
- Coordinates: 41.879984°N 87.636663°W
- President: John J. Wall
- Main organ: Board of Governors
- Affiliations: Roman Catholic Church
- Website: www.catholicextension.org

The Catholic Extension Society (also known as Catholic Extension and the Catholic Church Extension Society) is a national fundraising 501(c)(3) organization which supports and strengthens poor mission dioceses across the United States. They provide funding and resources to dioceses and parishes through programs and services investing in people, infrastructure and ministries. This support is given based on need, passion and commitment to the growth of the Catholic faith.

== History ==
Francis Kelley, a priest from Lapeer, Michigan, first envisioned Catholic Extension in 1904. Through his travels, he discovered places and communities that were struggling to keep the Catholic faith alive and growing. The Archbishop of Chicago, James Edward Quigley, agreed to help Kelley launch this new organization. As a result, the Catholic Church Extension Society was organized on October 18, 1905. Temporary headquarters were established in Lapeer, Michigan, where a charter was granted to the society by the state of Michigan on December 25, 1905.

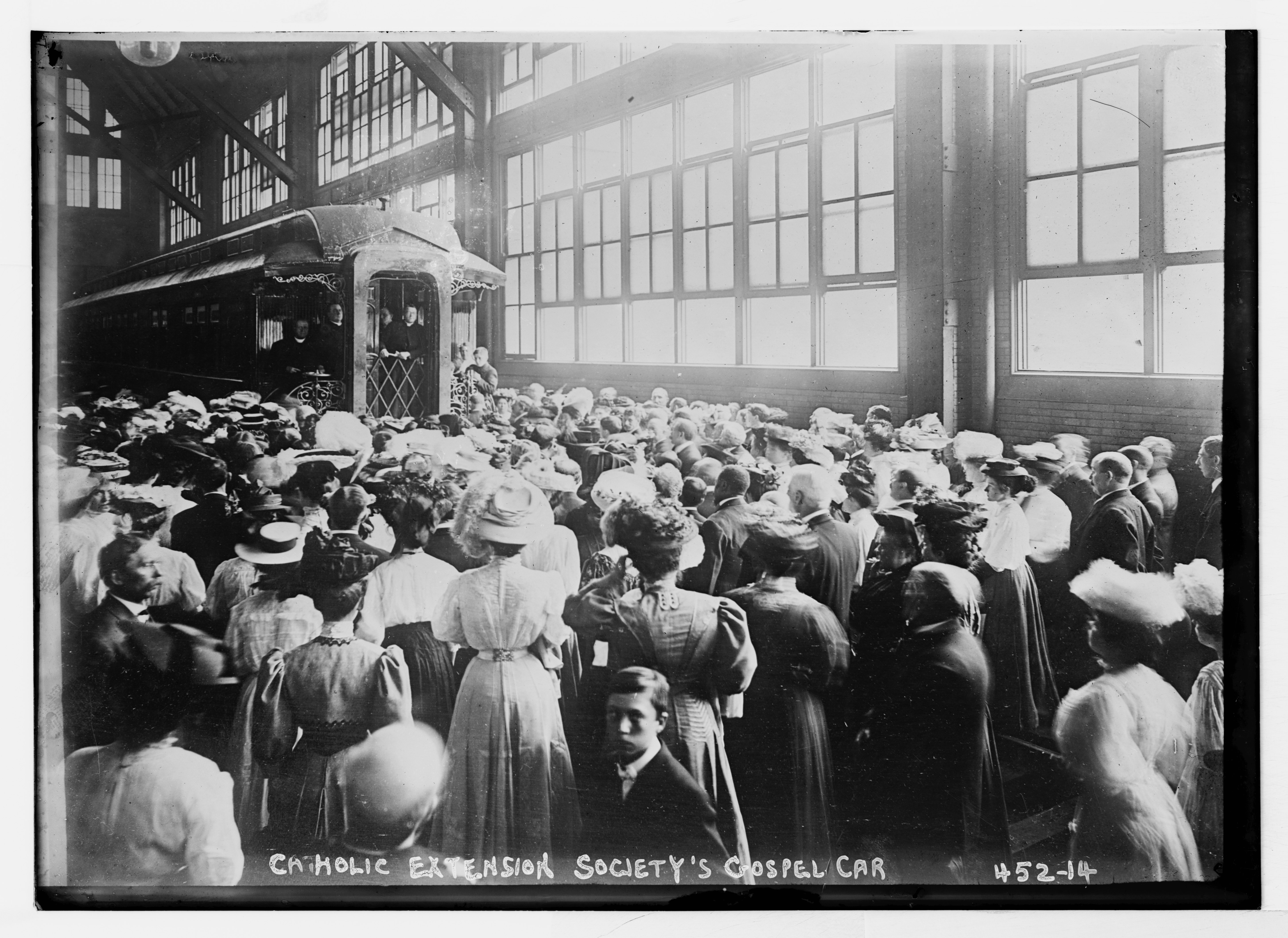
Catholic Extension Society's gospel car, c. 1908

In January 1907, society headquarters were moved to Chicago, and the president was transferred to that archdiocese. On June 7, 1907, Catholic Extension received its first papal approval by an apostolic letter of Pope Pius X addressed to the Archbishop of Chicago. Almost exactly three years later, on June 9, 1910, the Pope issued a brief by which the society was raised to the dignity of a canonical institution directly under his own guidance and protection. By the terms of this brief, the Archbishop of Chicago will always remain chancellor of the society, and the president must be appointed by the Pope himself. The president's term of office is not more than five years. The board of governors has the right to propose three names to the Holy See for this office, and to elect, according to their laws, all other officers of the society.

Mission dioceses generally are rural, cover a large geographic area, and have limited personnel and pastoral resources. Since 1905, the society has given more than $500 million to 94 mission dioceses across the country. Extension has been active in Puerto Rico for over 100 years, funding about 1,400 building projects.

== Present day ==
In 2012, Catholic Extension approved a $56,000 two year grant to the Archdiocese for the Military Services to support a faith formation program for Catholics in the United States military. In 2018, Catholic Extension launched a Mission Immersion Program for pastors from various parts of the country, which allows them to experience circumstances pastors in poor areas of the country face. Large-scale raids conducted in August 2019 by U.S. Immigration and Customs Enforcement resulted in the arrest of 680 people at various food processing plants in the state of Mississippi. Extension set up "The Holy Family" fund to financially assist families without their main breadwinner because of detention or deportation. The fund will be managed by the Roman Catholic Diocese of Jackson.

== Leadership ==
- Chancellor – Blase J. Cupich, Archbishop of Chicago
- Vice Chancellor – Gerald F. Kicanas, Bishop of Tucson
- President – John J. Wall

=== Past presidents ===
- Francis Clement Kelley – Founder, President 1905–1924
- William D. O'Brien – President 1925–1962
- Joseph B. Lux – President 1962–1966
- Kenneth G. Stack – President 1966–1968
- John L. May – President 1968–1970
- Joseph A. Cusack – President 1970–1976
- Edward J. Slattery – President 1977–1994
- Kenneth J. Velo – President 1994–2001
- William R. Houck – President 2001–2007

== Extension Magazine ==
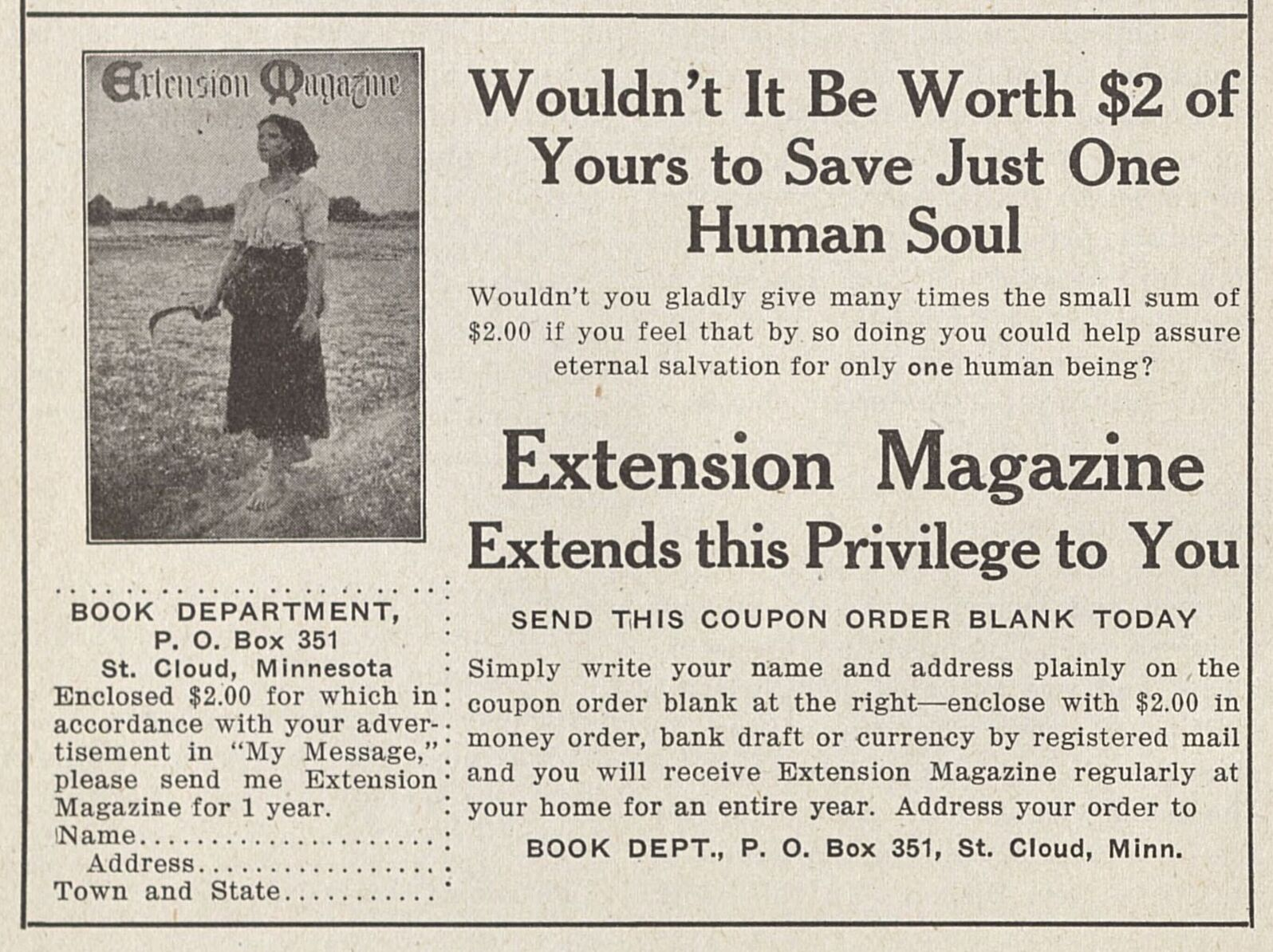
Advertisement for Extension Magazine, from My Message, Official Organ of the Diocese of St. Cloud (St. Cloud, Minnesota), Volume 1, Number 10.

In April 1906, the society began the publication of a quarterly bulletin called Extension. In May 1907, this quarterly was enlarged and changed into a monthly bulletin. Kelley served as the original writer, editor and publisher. Since then, Extension has developed to include a collection of articles illustrating the history of the Catholic Church in America. Now a quarterly publication.

== Lumen Christi award ==
Every year, Catholic Extension's Lumen Christi award honors an individual or group working in one of America's mission dioceses who demonstrates how the power of faith can transform lives and communities. The $1,000 award is accompanied by a $50,000 grant: $25,000 for the honoree and $25,000 for his or her nominating diocese. In 2018, the Lumen Christi was awarded to Marie-Paule Willem, a Franciscan Missionary of Mary, serving in the Diocese of Las Cruces, New Mexico, honored a lifetime of missionary work.
