= Eusebius J. Beltran =

American Catholic prelate (1934–2025)

His Excellency, The Most Reverend Eusebius J. Beltran
- Archbishop of Oklahoma City
- Archdiocese: Oklahoma City
- Appointed: November 24, 1992
- Installed: January 22, 1993
- Retired: December 16, 2010
- Predecessor: Charles Alexander K. Salatka
- Successor: Paul Stagg Coakley
- Previous post: Bishop of Tulsa (1978–1993)

Orders
- Ordination: May 14, 1960 by Francis Edward Hyland
- Consecration: April 20, 1978 by Charles Salatka, Thomas Andrew Donnellan, and Andrew Joseph McDonald

Personal details
- Born: August 31, 1934 Ashley, Pennsylvania, U.S.
- Died: September 12, 2025 (aged 91) Oklahoma City, Oklahoma, U.S.
- Denomination: Catholic Church
- Motto: We are one in Christ

Styles of Eusebius Joseph Beltran
- Reference style: His Excellency; The Most Reverend
- Spoken style: Your Excellency
- Religious style: Archbishop

Eusebius Joseph Beltran (August 31, 1934 – September 12, 2025) was an American Catholic prelate who served as archbishop of Oklahoma City in Oklahoma from 1993 until 2010. He previously served as bishop of Tulsa in Oklahoma from 1978 to 1992. Beltran participated in the Selma to Montgomery marches in 1965 during the American civil rights movement.

== Biography ==
=== Early life ===
Eusebius Beltran was born on August 31, 1934, in Ashley, Pennsylvania, to Joseph and Helen (née Kozlowski) Beltran. His father was a Spanish immigrant and coal miner, who later died of black lung disease. The fifth of eight children, Beltran had two siblings who entered the religious life as well; one brother also became a priest and one sister became a nun, taking the religious name Sister Sponsa and working as a missionary in Liberia. Eusebius Beltran was raised in Wilkes Barre, Pennsylvania, and attended Marymount School. He took the name Joseph as his confirmation name.

After Beltran's father contracted black lung disease from working in the mines, he moved the family to Georgia in search of different employment. Aspiring to become a missionary, Eusebius Beltran became a seminarian for the Diocese of Savannah following his graduation from high school. Beltran returned to Pennsylvania for eight years, studying at St. Charles Borromeo Seminary in Philadelphia.

=== Priesthood ===
Beltran was ordained to the priesthood by Bishop Francis Hyland on May 14, 1960, for the Diocese of Atlanta. Beltran then did pastoral and curial work in the Atlanta diocese (raised to archdiocese in 1962) until 1978. He attended the Second Vatican Council sessions in Rome during the early 1960's as a peritus to Archbishop Paul Hallinan. He also participated in the Selma to Montgomery marches in 1965 during the American civil rights movement. From 1971 to 1978, Beltran served as vicar general for the archdiocese.

=== Bishop of Tulsa ===
On February 28, 1978, Beltran was appointed bishop of Tulsa by Pope Paul VI. He was consecrated on April 20, 1978, by Archbishop Charles Salatka, with Archbishop Thomas Donnellan and Bishop Andrew McDonald serving as co-consecrators. His mother, Helen, died shortly afterwards. Most notable among his charity work were his efforts to assist persons in need, including unwed mothers, HIV/AIDS victims, homeless families, and women who had just been released from prison.

=== Archbishop of Oklahoma City ===
On November 24, 1992, Beltran was selected as archbishop of Oklahoma City by Pope John Paul II. He was installed on January 22, 1993. Beltran became the official publisher of the Sooner Catholic, a bi-monthly newspaper for Catholics in Oklahoma. Beltran's sermons were featured in each number of the newspaper during his reign.

In 1999, Reverend James Francis Rapp was arrested and pleaded no contest to sexually abusing two boys in Duncan, Oklahoma. During a subsequent civil trial, it was discovered that Beltran knew about Rapp's prior history of abuse as early as 1994. Beltran received medical documents and psychiatric evaluations of Rapp that advised the priest should not be allowed to work with children.

In 2009, Beltran expressed his opposition to President Barack Obama giving the commencement speech at and receiving an honorary degree from the University of Notre Dame in Indiana because Obama "approved of abortion and other atrocities against human life."

=== Retirement and death ===
Upon reaching his 75th birthday in 2009, Beltran submitted to the Vatican a letter of resignation as archbishop of Oklahoma City, as required by Catholic canon law. His request was accepted by Pope Benedict XVI on December 16, 2010, during a press conference at which his successor, Bishop Paul Stagg Coakley of the Diocese of Salina, Kansas, was introduced.

Beltran died in Oklahoma City on September 12, 2025, 12 days after his 91st birthday.

Catholic Church titles
Preceded by Charles A. Salatka	Archbishop of Oklahoma City; 1993–2010	Succeeded by Paul S. Coakley
Preceded by Bernard J. Ganter	Bishop of Tulsa; 1978–1993	Succeeded by Edward J. Slattery
