= Archdiocese of Oklahoma City =

Latin Catholic ecclesiastical jurisdiction in Oklahoma, USA

Coordinates: 35°33′41″N 97°38′46″W

Archdiocese of Oklahoma City Archidioecesis Oclahomensis
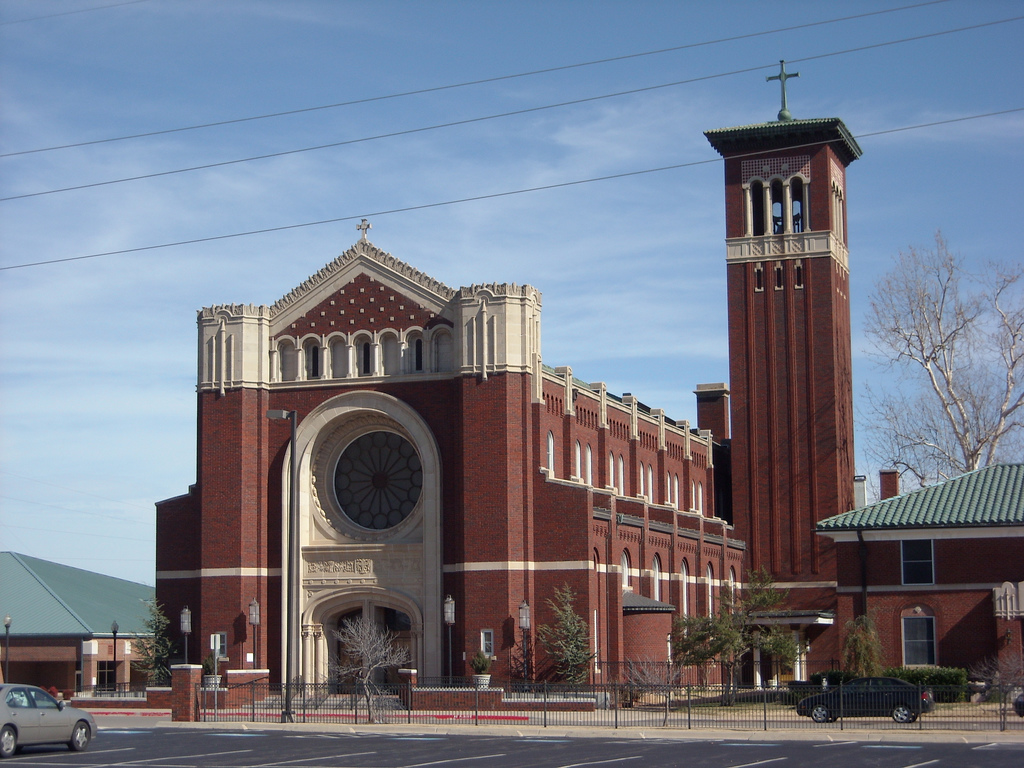
- The Cathedral of Our Lady of Perpetual Help

- Coat of Arms of the Archdiocese of Oklahoma City

Location
- Country: United States
- Ecclesiastical province: Archdiocese of Oklahoma City

Statistics
- Area: 42,470 sq mi (110,000 km^{2})
- Population: Total; Catholics: (as of 2021); ▲2,231,272; ▲178,502 (▲8%)

Information
- Denomination: Catholic
- Sui iuris church: Latin Church
- Rite: Roman Rite
- Established: August 23, 1905
- Cathedral: Cathedral of Our Lady of Perpetual Help

Current leadership
- Pope: Leo XIV
- Archbishop: Paul Stagg Coakley
- Vicar General: Very Rev. William Novak, V.G.
- Judicial Vicar: Reverend William Banowsky

Map
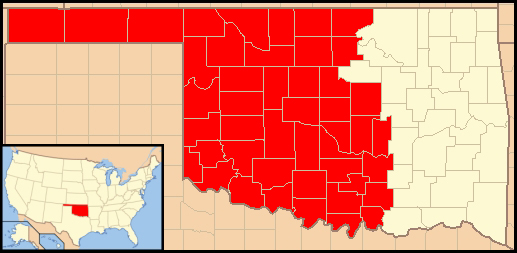

Website
- archokc.org

The Archdiocese of Oklahoma City (Latin: Archidioecesis Oclahomensis) is a Catholic archdiocese of western Oklahoma in the United States. The mother church of the archdiocese is the Cathedral of Our Lady of Perpetual Help in Oklahoma City. Paul Coakley is the archbishop of Oklahoma City.

== History ==
=== 1500 to 1875 ===
The first Catholic presence in present-day Oklahoma may have been the expeditions of the Spanish explorers Francisco Vásquez y Coronado and Hernando de Soto in 1541 and 1542. However, there is no evidence of missionary activity in the region until the 1830s. With the passage by the US Congress of the Indian Removal Act of 1830, tens of thousands of Native Americans from the southern and midwestern states were moved west to the Indian Territory, which included Oklahoma.

The first Catholic presence in present-day Oklahoma, then known officially as the Indian Territory, was in 1830. Charles Van Quickenborne, a Jesuit priest, traveled from St. Louis, Missouri, to minister to Osage Nation people in the Cabin Creek area. At this time, the Indian Territory was under the official Catholic jurisdiction of the Diocese of Little Rock. Over the next several decades, missionary priests from Arkansas would make periodic trips into the territory to visit the Native American peoples.

=== 1875 to 1905 ===
In 1875, Isadore Robot, a French Benedictine priest arrived in the Indian Territory. His goal was to establish an abbey for other members of their order being persecuted in France. In 1876, Pope Pius IX erected the Apostolic Prefecture of Indian Territory, removing the Indian Territory from the Diocese of Little Rock. The pope named Robot as the first prefect of the territory. The Benedictines later opened the Sacred Heart Mission on the land of the Potawatomi Nation. That mission later became St. Gregory's Abbey and College.

In 1880, Robot opened a girls school at the Potawatomi Nation, staffed by several nuns from New Orleans. In 1884, Robot opened Our Lady of Good Counsel Parish at Lehigh, the second Catholic church in Indian Territory. Robot resigned as prefect in 1887. The Vatican replaced him with the Benedictine Ignatius Jean. In 1889, Jean invited the Benedictine Sisters from Iowa to open a monastery in present-day Guthrie.

In 1891, recognizing the increasing population of the Indian Territory, Pope Leo XIII elevated the Apostolic Prefecture of Indian Territory to the Apostolic Vicariate of Indian Territory. The pope named Theophile Meerschaert from the Diocese of Natchez as the apostolic vicar. At the time of Meerschaert's arrival, the new vicariate had three diocesan priests, 23 Benedictine monks, 21 churches, seven day schools, five Native American boarding schools, one college, one monastery, six convents and a Catholic population of approximately 5,000. The first Catholic church in Oklahoma City, St. Joseph's, was completed in 1889.

=== 1905 to 1972 ===
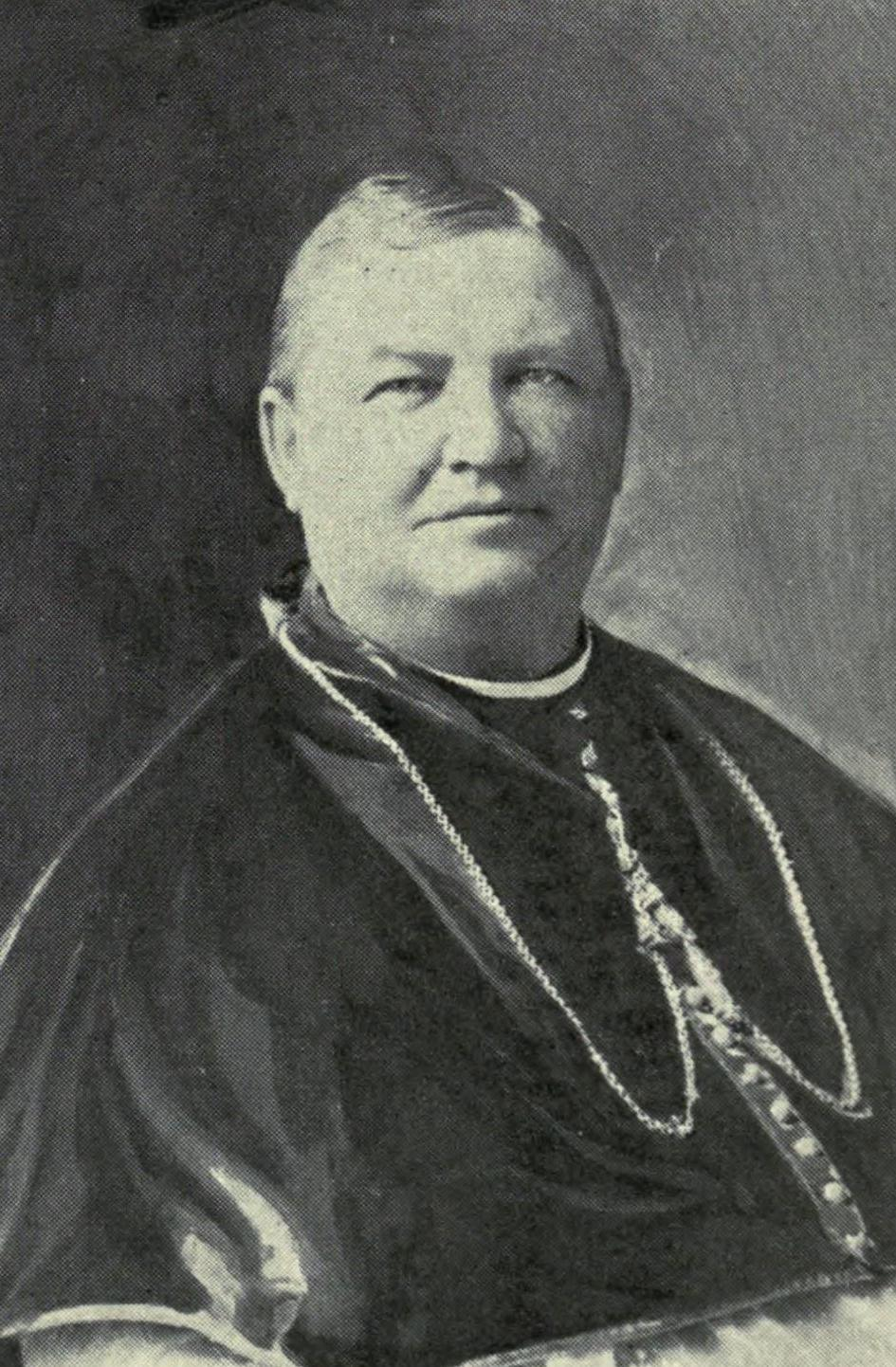
Bishop Meerschaert (1903)

In 1905, Pope Pius X erected the Diocese of Oklahoma City, suppressing the apostolic vicariate. The pope named Meerschaert as its first bishop of the new diocese. St. Joseph's Church was designated as its cathedral. The Indian Territory in the east and the Oklahoma Territory in the west became the State of Oklahoma in 1907. Meerschaert dedicated about 100 new churches and recruited over 12 American-born clergy during his tenures as vicar and bishop. By the time of his death in 1924, the Catholic population in the diocese had increased elevenfold.

The second bishop of Oklahoma was Francis Kelley, a Vatican diplomat elevated to the episcopacy in 1924. He successfully resisted the agitation of the Ku Klux Klan in the diocese and worked as the "Extension Bishop." In 1930, Pius XI renamed the Diocese of Oklahoma as the Diocese of Oklahoma City-Tulsa, reflected population trends in Oklahoma. Kelley remained as bishop. In 1931, Our Lady of Perpetual Help Church in Oklahoma City became the new cathedral for the diocese. Bishop Eugene J. McGuinness from the Diocese of Raleigh was appointed coadjutor bishop of Oklahoma City-Tulsa in 1944 by Pope Pius XII to assist Kelley. When Kelley died in 1948, McGuiness succeeded him as bishop.

In 1949, McGuiness established the National Shrine of the Infant Jesus of Prague at St. Wenceslaus Parish in Prague, Oklahoma. During his nine-year administration, McGuinness saw the Catholic population in the state grow by almost 40 percent and received 1,242 adult converts in 1957 alone. Priestly and religious vocations increased and he made trips to Ireland and Poland to recruit clergy.

In December 1957, Pius XII selected Victor Reed as an auxiliary bishop in Oklahoma City-Tulsa. However, McGuinness died before Reed was consecrated. The pope named Reed in January 1958 to serve instead as bishop of the diocese. After the Second Vatican Council in Rome between 1962 and 1965, Reed introduced the use of vernacular in the mass and an emphasis on pastoral over administrative skills in bishops. In 1966, a group picketed his residence and called for his removal. They accused Reed of following "un-Catholic" policies and participating in a "worldwide atheistic conspiracy for world domination" led by communists. Reed died in 1971. Auxiliary Bishop John R. Quinn from the Diocese of San Diego succeeded Reed in 1971.

=== 1972 to 1992 ===
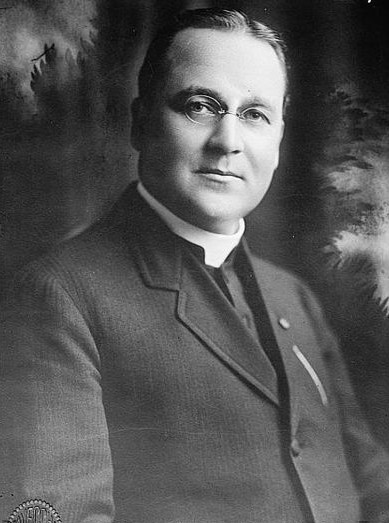
Bishop Kelley (pre-1948)

On December 13, 1972, Paul VI elevated the Diocese of Oklahoma City-Tulsa to the Archdiocese of Oklahoma City. At the same time, he erected the Diocese of Tulsa, consisting of eastern Oklahoma. The new archdiocese now contained the counties of central and western Oklahoma. The Dioceses of Little Rock and Tulsa became suffragan dioceses of the archdiocese. Quinn became the first archbishop of Oklahoma City. Quinn became archbishop of San Francisco in 1977.

The second archbishop of Oklahoma City was Bishop Charles Salatka from the Diocese of Marquette, appointed by Paul VI in 1977. He founded the Office of Hispanic Ministry in the 1970s and learned to speak Spanish at age 68 so that he could celebrate mass in that language. In October 1981, Salatka celebrated a funeral mass in Oklahoma City for Stanley Rother, a priest from the diocese. Rother had been murdered by three assassins in July 1981 while on a mission in Guatemala. Salatka had recalled Rother to Oklahoma in January 1981 due to threats on his life. However, Rother persuaded him to allow his return to Guatemala. Salatka retired in 1992.

=== 1992 to present ===
Pope John Paul II named Bishop Eusebius J. Beltran of Tulsa as archbishop of Oklahoma City in 1992. Beltran became the official publisher of the Sooner Catholic, a bimonthly newspaper for Catholics in Oklahoma. Beltran's sermons were featured in each number of the newspaper during his tenure. Beltran retired in 2009.

Bishop Paul Coakley of the Diocese of Salina became the next archbishop of Oklahoma City, named by Pope Benedict XVI in 2010. In 2014, Coakley sued a Satanist group in Oklahoma City, saying that they had stolen consecrated host from a church to use in a so-called black mass ceremony at the Civic Center Music Hall in Oklahoma City. However, when the host was returned to the archdiocese a few days later, Coakley dropped the lawsuit. In 2017, Rother was beatified during a mass at the Cox Convention Center in Oklahoma City. Pope Francis had declared him a martyr, saying he had been killed in odium fidei (in hatred of the faith).

The Blessed Stanley Rother Shrine in Oklahoma City was dedicated by Coakley in February 2023.The Oklahoma Statewide Virtual Charter School Board in October 2023 approved the creation of the St. Isidore of Seville Catholic Virtual School, the first religious charter school in the nation. It was immediately challenged in court as violating the separation of church and state. The Oklahoma Supreme Court ruled against St. Isidore in June 2025.As of 2026, Coakley is the archbishop of Oklahoma City.

=== Sex abuse ===
In 1999, James Rapp, a priest of the Archdiocese of Oklahoma City, pleaded no contest to sexually abusing two boys during the 1990s and was sentenced to 40 years in state prison.

The archdiocese in October 2019 released an investigative report by an outside law firm on allegations of sexual abuse of minors by archdiocesan clergy. The report named 11 priests with credible accusations of sexual abuse.

== Bishops ==
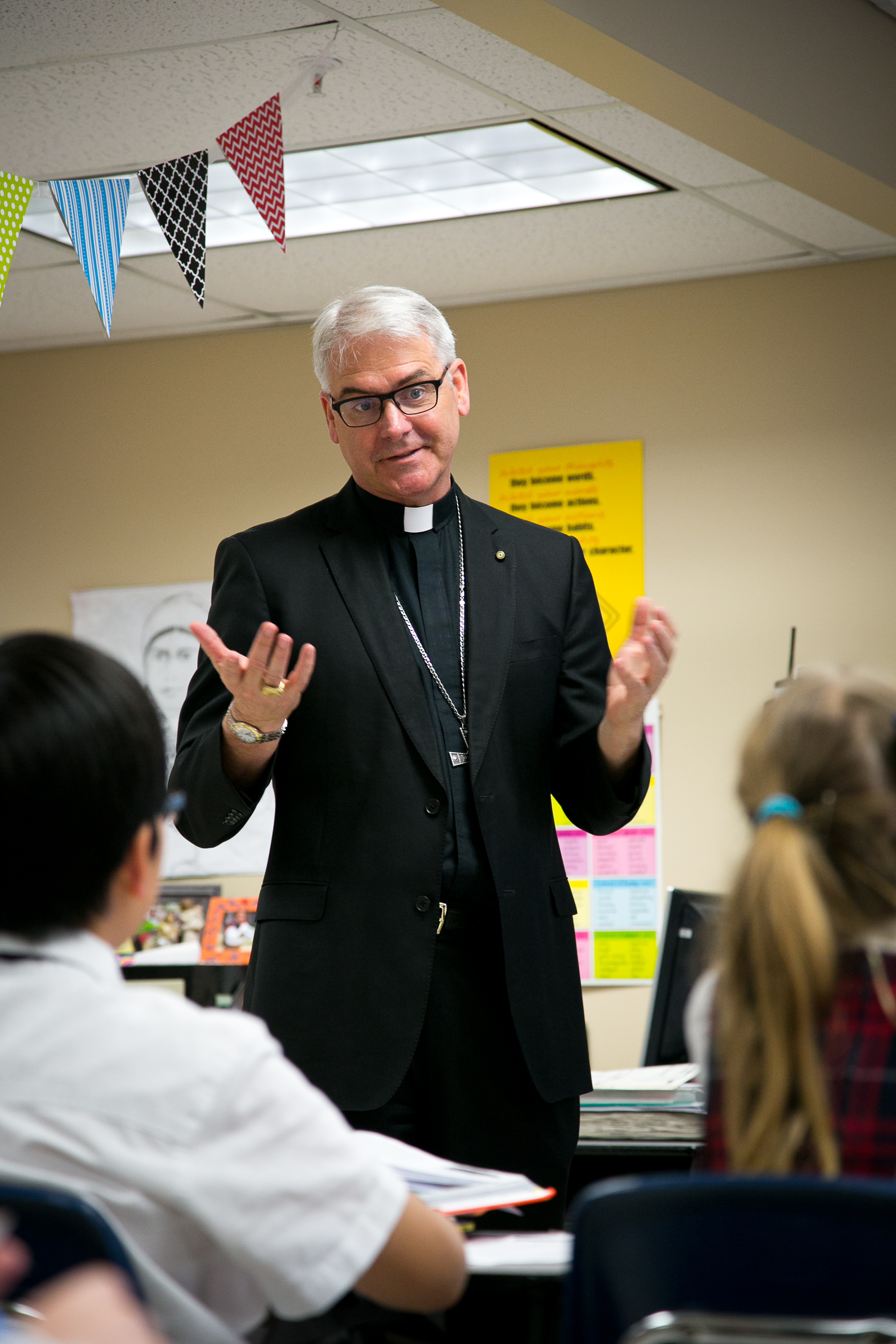
Archbishop Coakley (2015)

=== Apostolic Prefects of Indian Territory ===
1. Isidore Robot (1876–1887)
2. Ignatius Jean (1887–1890)

=== Apostolic Vicar of Indian Territory ===
Theophile Meerschaert (1891–1905), appointed Bishop of Oklahoma

=== Bishops of Oklahoma ===
1. Theophile Meerschaert (1905–1924)
2. Francis Kelley (1924–1930), title changed with title of diocese

=== Bishops of Oklahoma City-Tulsa ===
1. Francis Kelley (1930–1948)
2. Eugene J. McGuinness (1948–1957; coadjutor bishop 1944–1948)
3. Victor Reed (1958–1971)
4. John R. Quinn (1971–1972), elevated to archbishop and title changed with title of diocese

=== Archbishops of Oklahoma City ===
1. John R. Quinn (1972–1977), appointed Archbishop of San Francisco
2. Charles Salatka (1977–1992)
3. Eusebius J. Beltran (1992–2010)
4. Paul Stagg Coakley (2011–present)

=== Other diocesan priests who became bishops ===
- Stephen Aloysius Leven, appointed auxiliary bishop of San Antonio in 1955 and Bishop of San Angelo in 1969
- Charles Albert Buswell, appointed Bishop of Pueblo in 1959
- John Joseph Sullivan, appointed Bishop of Grand Island in 1972 and Bishop of Kansas City-St. Joseph in 1977
- Anthony Basil Taylor, appointed Bishop of Little Rock in 2008
- Edward Joseph Weisenburger, appointed Bishop of Salina in 2012, Bishop of Tucson in 2017, and Archbishop of Detroit in 2025

== Newspaper ==
The official news and information publication of the diocese is the Sooner Catholic.

== High schools ==
- Bishop McGuinness High School – Oklahoma City
- Cristo Rey OKC – Oklahoma City
- Mount St. Mary High School – Oklahoma City

== Closed university ==
St. Gregory's University – Shawnee (closed 2017)

== Ecclesiastical province ==
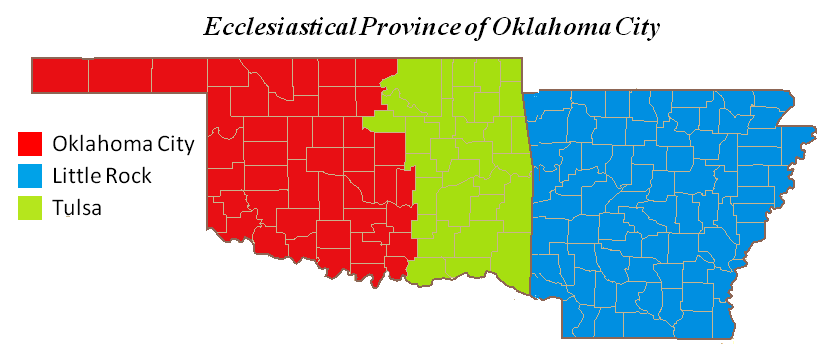
Ecclesiastical Province of Oklahoma City

See: List of the Catholic bishops of the United States
