= Sister Sponsa Beltran =

American missionary (1925–2016)

- Born: Rosarie Beltran; March 25, 1925
- Died: April 6, 2016 (aged 91); Reading, Pennsylvania, U.S.
- Education: College Misericordia
- Organization: Bernardine Sisters of St. Francis
- Relatives: Eusebius J. Beltran (brother)

Sister Sponsa Beltran (born Rosarie Beltran; March 25, 1925 – April 6, 2016) was an American missionary who was part of the Bernardine Sisters of St. Francis. She was known for her work in Liberia as a nurse and caregiver for abandoned, displaced children and children with disabilities. She founded Our Lady of Fatima Rehabilitation Facility outside of Monrovia in 1998 and later, that work was taken over by the Jerry Cebulski African Disability Foundation (JCADF) which still operates to this day.

== Biography ==
Beltran was born Rosarie Beltran on March 25, 1925, and grew up in Wilkes-Barre, Pennsylvania. Beltran was the eldest of eight children and was the sister of the Archbishop Eusebius J. Beltran. She attended St. Leo's School in Ashley, Pennsylvania.

Afterward, she attended Marymount High School and planned to become a nun after graduation. Beltran became part of the Bernadine Franciscan Sisters in 1944. In 1964, she graduated from College Misericordia and also became a registered nurse. She began to work with people with disabilities in the area.

Beltran went to Liberia as a missionary in 1970. She started working in Cape Palmas at a clinic for the poor. In 1977, she left Liberia because of her macular degeneration and returned after treatment in 1986.

In 1989, Beltran and her students were forcibly relocated to the Ivory Coast after she was involved in a confrontation between soldiers in the First Liberian Civil War. Later in 1989, she founded a new center. She and the children were in exile in the Ivory Coast for around five years. While in exile, she contacted Muhammad Ali for help in donations for the children in her care. In 1997, he came to San Pedro to deliver supplies and food to the 105 children who were staying at the Centre Bon Berger Catholic Mission.

Beltran bought 13 acres of land where she built a small community called Our Lady of Fatima Rehabilitation Facility near Monrovia that included a school, clinic and chapel. It was opened in 1998 and the children that had been displaced to the Ivory Coast were returned to Liberia. The facility was created to provide education and care to displaced or abandoned young people and people with disabilities.

Beltran retired from her work after becoming fully blind in 2007. In order to continue the work she started, the Jerry Cebulski African Disability Foundation (JCADF) was created. Beltran came back to the United States and moved into St. Joseph's Villa, a retirement home for Bernadine Sisters in Reading, Pennsylvania.

Beltran died on April 6, 2016, in Reading, at the age of 91. JCADF continues to operate in Liberia, providing food, supplies and assistive devices for people with disabilities.
