= Beltrami (surname) =

Beltrami is an Italian surname first originating from Bologna, the surname has since spread across numerous regions and cities throughout Northern and Southern Italy The highest number of people with the surname Beltrami are found in Emilia Romagna and Lombardy. The Surname can also be found in Tuscany, Lazio and Parts of Calabria.

The surname Beltrami is a patronymic derived from the given name Beltramo, which originated during the Frankish rule of the Kingdom of the Lombards when the Frankish conquerors brought the name Bertrand/Bertram to Italy. Over time, this evolved into the Italianized form Beltramo, which finally became the patronymic surname Beltrami from the 12th century onward. The origin of the name, in turn, lies in an old Germanic name meaning "shining shield" or "shining raven" (Old High German: berht - bright/shining and rand for shield or hramn for raven).

Notable people with the surname include:

- Eugenio Beltrami (1835–1900), Italian mathematician
- Filippo Beltrami (1908–1944), Italian officer and Resistance leader during World War II
- Giacomo Beltrami (1779–1855), Italian count for whom the Minnesota county is named, and who claimed (inaccurately) to have discovered the Mississippi River headwaters
- Giuseppe Beltrami (1889–1973) Italian cardinal
- Hugo Beltrami, Canadian natural scientist
- Ivan Beltrami (born 1969), Italian former cyclist
- Joseph Beltrami (1932–2015), Scottish lawyer
- Luca Beltrami (1854–1933), Italian architect, restorer
- Marco Beltrami (born 1966), Italian-American film composer
- Mario Beltrami (1902–1987), Italian painter
