= Hugo Beltrami =

Canadian natural scientist

Hugo Beltrami is a Canadian natural scientist, currently a Canada Research Chair in Climate Dynamics at St. Francis Xavier University. He works as a professor in the Climate & Atmospheric Sciences Institute at St. Francis Xavier University.

Beltrami has a bachelor of Science in Physics from the University of Winnipeg, a Master of Science in Theoretical Astrophysics from Queen's University and a PhD in Environmental Science's from the Université du Québec à Montréal. His research focuses on energy exchange between the atmosphere and the shallow subsurface of the Earth's continental crust.
