= Francis Kelley =

Canadian-born Catholic bishop (1870–1948)

Francis Clement Kelley
- Bishop of Oklahoma City-Tulsa
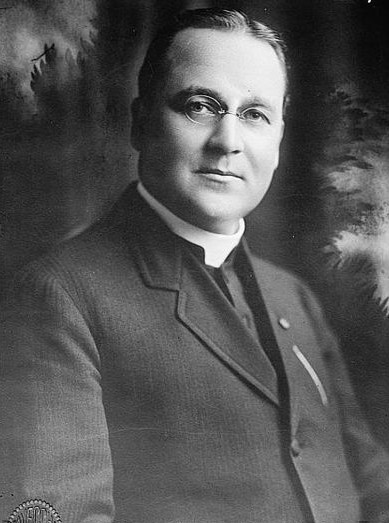
- See: Oklahoma City
- In office: June 25, 1924 — February 1, 1948
- Predecessor: Theophile Meerschaert
- Successor: Eugene J. McGuinness

Orders
- Ordination: August 23, 1893

Personal details
- Born: October 23, 1870 Vernon River, Prince Edward Island, Canada
- Died: February 1, 1948 (aged 77) Oklahoma City, Oklahoma, U.S.
- Occupation: Priest, author

Francis Clement Kelley (October 23, 1870 – February 1, 1948) was a Canadian-born Catholic bishop. He was the second Bishop of Oklahoma City, as well as an author and diplomat. He was a Catholic priest for 54 years, and bishop for 23 years.

== Early life ==
Francis Clement Kelley was born in Vernon River, Prince Edward Island, Canada, to John and Mary Kelley. His sister was poet Lucy Gertrude Clarkin. He was educated at St. Dunstan's College, Prince Edward Island, and ordained a priest for the diocese of Detroit, Michigan, in 1893. Father Kelley served as a military chaplain during the Spanish–American War, as a captain with the Michigan National Guard. He was later promoted to the rank of colonel. Kelley served as vice commander general of the Military Order of Foreign Wars, a veterans' group, for five years.

While pastor in Lapeer, Michigan in 1905, he founded the Catholic Church Extension Society of the United States with the help of James Edward Quigley, Archbishop of Chicago. Kelley was elected its first president. The Extension Society continues to promote the mission of the Catholic Church in rural and mission areas of the United States and abroad. Kelley also founded and edited the quarterly Extension Magazine, which had more than 3 million subscribers during his administration. In addition to his editorial duties, he authored numerous books.

As a diplomat, Kelley represented the bishops of Mexico during the World War I Peace Conference in Paris. He also initiated unofficial negotiations between the Vatican and the Italian government for a settlement of the Roman Question. Two years after the war, Kelley was sent to England by the Vatican to settle postwar differences over German and American missions. As president of the Extension Society, Kelley also represented the Mexican bishops during the Carranza Revolution. He established a seminary in Texas for exiled Mexican seminarians and clergy.

== Episcopacy ==
Styles of Francis Kelly
- Reference style: The Most Reverend
- Spoken style: Your Excellency
- Religious style: Monsignor
- Posthumous style: none

Bishop Kelley's coat of arms

Kelley was consecrated Bishop of Oklahoma in 1924. During his years as Bishop, he successfully resisted the agitation of the KKK and continued his work as the "Extension Bishop." Like other missionary dioceses in the country, Oklahoma received funds from the Catholic Extension to build and to furnish churches. In 1931, Our Lady of Perpetual Help Church became the new cathedral for the diocese, which had become the Diocese of Oklahoma City-Tulsa in 1930.

In 1932, Kelley succeeded Bishop Joseph H. Conroy of Ogdensburg, New York as Chairman of the Bishops Catholic Committee on Scouting. Under his leadership the Catholic Committee expanded to include 22 Archbishops and Bishops, one from each Ecclesiastical Province in the United States. In 1934 the American hierarchy approved a "Plan of Cooperation" recognizing Scouting as serving the church's interest in the spiritual welfare of Catholic youth, and approving it as an approved youth program in the Church. Bishop Kelly was recognized by the Boy Scouts of America with the Silver Buffalo Award in 1939, the first member of the catholic clergy to be so recognized.

== Death and legacy ==
Bishop Kelley died in Oklahoma City on February 1, 1948, aged 77.

Bishop Kelley High School (in Tulsa, Oklahoma) and Bishop Kelley Catholic School (in Lapeer, Michigan) are named for Bishop Francis Kelley.

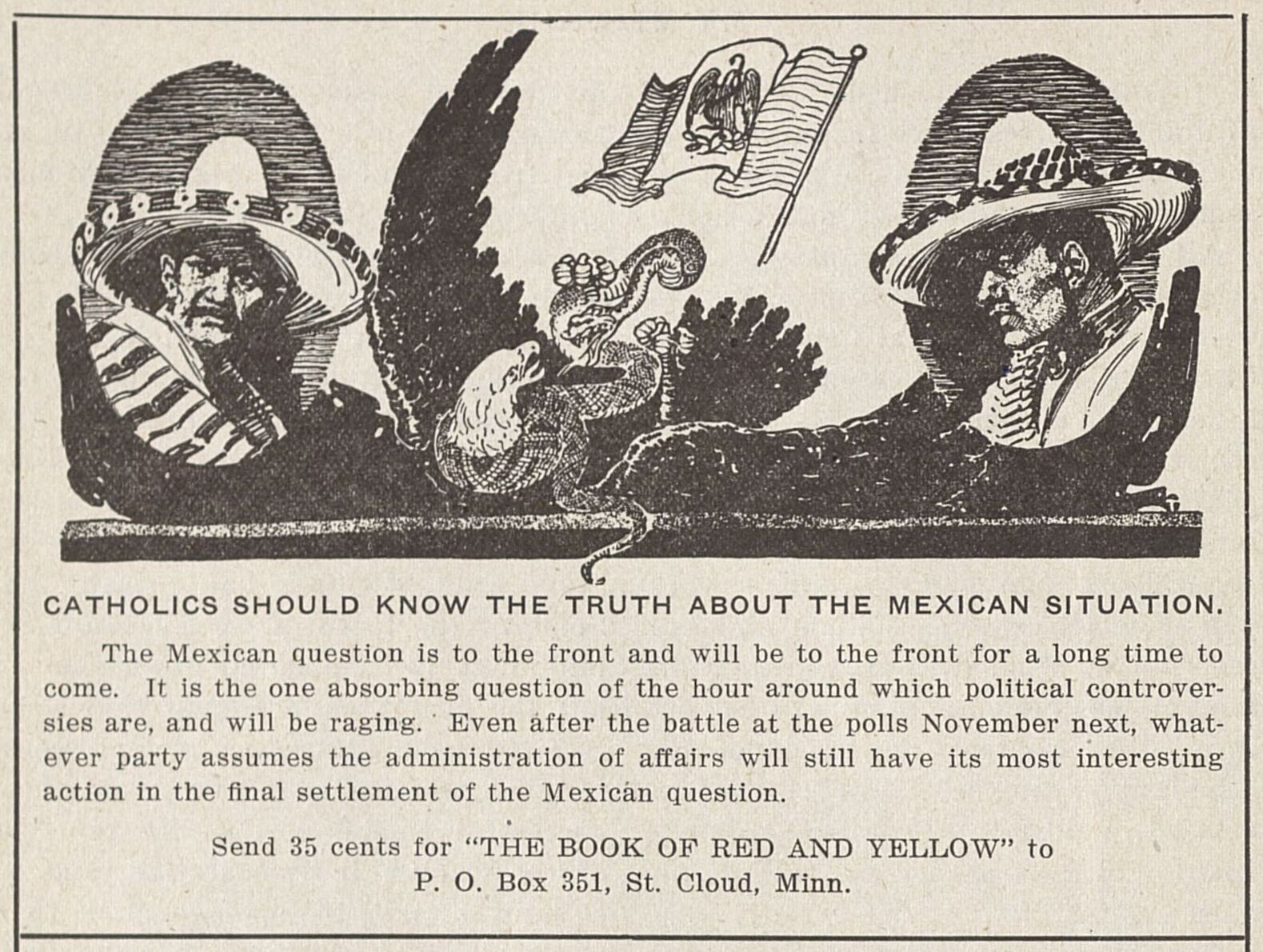
Advertisement for The Book of Red and Yellow, from My Message, Official Organ of the Diocese of St. Cloud (St. Cloud, Minnesota), Volume 1, Number 10.

== Select bibliography ==
Blood Drenched Altars (1933) is an historical overview of Catholicism in Mexico. Problem Island (1937), is a science fiction novel set on a tropical Island where a Lost Race is found. In Pack Rat: A Metaphoric Phantasy (1942), rats parody humans, but lack souls.

- The Last Battle of the Gods (1907)
- The City and the World (1913, 1919)
- The Book of Red and Yellow: Being a Story of Blood and a Yellow Streak (1915) located at HathiTrust digital Library
- Letters to Jack (1917)
- Charred Wood (1917) (published under the name of Myles Muredach)
- Dominus Vobiscus (1922)
- Story of Extension (1922)

Catholic Church titles
Preceded by Theophile Meerschaert	Bishop of Oklahoma City-Tulsa; 1924–1948	Succeeded by Eugene J. McGuinness
