= Beltrán, Cundinamarca =

Beltrán
- Municipality and town
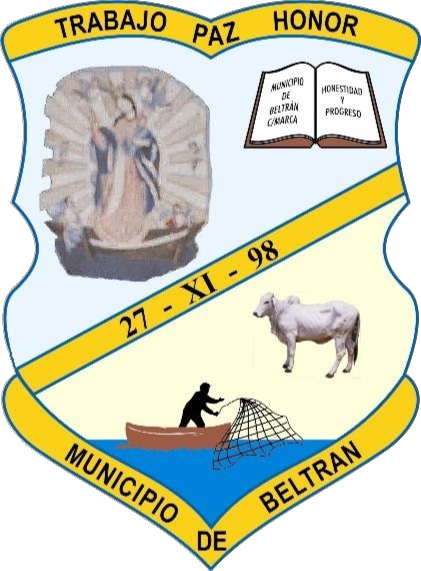
- Flag Coat of arms

- Location of the municipality and town inside Cundinamarca Department of Colombia

- Location in Colombia
- Coordinates: 4°48′5″N 74°44′35″W
- Country: Colombia
- Department: Cundinamarca
- Elevation: 235 m (771 ft)
- Time zone: UTC-5 (Colombia Standard Time)

Beltrán is a municipality and town of Colombia in the department of Cundinamarca.
