= Beltrán, Santiago del Estero =

Coordinates: 27°50′S 64°04′W

Beltrán (Santiago del Estero)
- Municipality and village
- Country: Argentina
- Province: Santiago del Estero

Government
  - Mayor: Daniel Manzano, PNC

Population (2001)
  - Total: 5,321
- Time zone: UTC−3 (ART)
- Postal code: 4308
- Area code: 0385

Beltrán (Santiago del Estero) is a municipality and village in Santiago del Estero in Argentina.

== History ==
There are archaeological deposits of the Mercedes and Averias cultures of the years 400 and 1100. They reveal the settlement of native peoples. The most studied and important areas include Vilmer, Beltran and Robles.

== Population ==
Beltrán has a population of 5,321 according to the 2001 census, which represents and increase of 21.87% over the previous census in 1991 when the population was 4,366.

== Economic activity ==
The main economic activities in Beltrán are livestock breeding, agriculture and forestry.
