= Carlos Beltrán (musician) =

Mexican keyboardist (born 1957)

Carlos Beltrán Martínez de Castro (born 1957) is a multi-instrumentalist from Mexico.

Martínez de Castro undertook classical training during his childhood that would influence his later composing. In the early 1970s, he was attracted to the sound of progressive rock of bands like Renaissance and Focus, and also to the soft rock produced by performers like America and James Taylor. In 1987, Carlos released his only album to date, "Jericho", where he played keyboards and percussion, whose sound was reminiscent of Klaus Schulze. The album didn't receive any attention in his native Mexico, but it was critically acclaimed first in Japan, then in other progressive quarters of Europe. Before he retired, he distributed a home-made tape simply called "Familia Carbajal". In 1997 "Jericho" appeared in CD format.
