= Paul Coakley =

American Catholic prelate (born 1955)

His Excellency, The Most Reverend Paul Coakley
- Archbishop of Oklahoma City; President of the United States Conference of Catholic Bishops
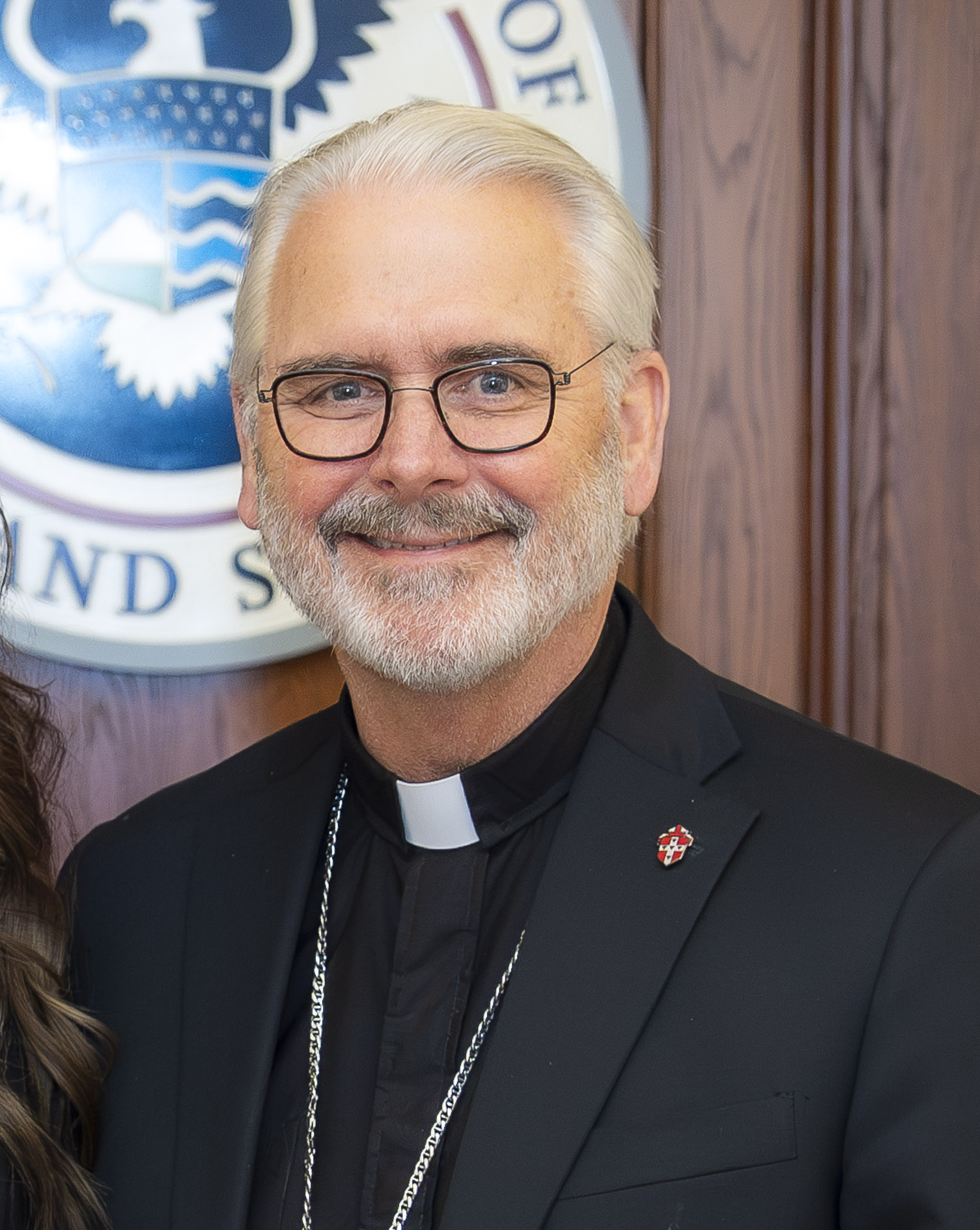
- Coakley in 2026
- Archdiocese: Oklahoma City
- Appointed: December 16, 2010
- Installed: February 11, 2011
- Predecessor: Eusebius J. Beltran
- Previous post: Bishop of Salina (2004–2010)

Orders
- Ordination: May 21, 1983 by Eugene John Gerber
- Consecration: December 28, 2004 by James Patrick Keleher, George Kinzie Fitzsimons, and Eugene John Gerber

Personal details
- Born: Paul Stagg Coakley; June 3, 1955 (age 71) Norfolk, Virginia, US
- Motto: Duc in altum (Latin for 'Put out into the deep')
- Styles
- Reference style: His Excellency; The Most Reverend
- Spoken style: Your Excellency
- Religious style: Archbishop

Paul Stagg Coakley (born June 3, 1955) is an American Catholic prelate who serves as Archbishop of Oklahoma City. He has been President of the United States Conference of Catholic Bishops since November 2025. He previously served as Bishop of Salina from 2004 to 2010.

== Early life and education ==
Coakley was born on June 3, 1955, in Norfolk, Virginia, to John and Mary Coakley. His mother was of French descent, and his father of Irish descent. Paul Coakley has an older brother, John, and a younger sister, Mary Christina. At age 2, he and his family moved to Metairie, Louisiana, where Coakley attended St. Mary Magdalen School from 1960 to 1965.

The Coakley family then moved to Overland Park, Kansas in 1965, where he attended Cherokee Elementary School for two years. He entered Broadmoor Junior High School in 1967, then graduated in 1970 to Shawnee Mission West High School in Overland.

After graduating from high school in 1973, Coakley enrolled at the University of Kansas (KU) in Lawrence, Kansas, earning a Bachelor of Arts in English and Classical Antiquities in 1977. During this period, he was also a student in KU's Integrated Humanities Program.

After graduating from KU, Coakley traveled in Europe. He briefly considered a monastic vocation at the Abbey of Notre Dame de Fontgombault in France. He then returned to the United States, where he entered St. Pius X Seminary in Erlanger, Kentucky, in 1978.

On April 8, 1982, Coakley was ordained a deacon by Bishop David M. Maloney. He studied at Mount St. Mary's Seminary in Emmitsburg, Maryland, earning a Master of Divinity in 1983.

== Priesthood ==
Coakley was ordained a priest for the Diocese of Wichita by Bishop Eugene John Gerber on May 21, 1983, at the Cathedral of the Immaculate Conception in Wichita.

After his ordination, the diocese assigned Coakley as chaplain at St. Francis Regional Medical Center in Wichita from June to August 1983, and then as associate pastor at St. Mary's Parish in Derby, from 1983 to 1985. Coakley then furthered his studies in Rome at the Pontifical Gregorian University, where he received a Licentiate of Sacred Theology in 1987.

Upon his return to Wichita, Coakley served as chaplain at Kansas Newman College in Wichita from 1987 to 1989. He also worked as director of the Office of Youth and Young Adult Ministries (1987–1991), and pastor of Our Lady of Guadalupe Church (1989–1990). From 1990 to 1995, he served as associate director of the Spiritual Life Center and associate pastor of St. Thomas Aquinas Parish. Coakley served as pastor of the Church of the Resurrection Parish from 1995 to 1998 before returning to Mount St. Mary's Seminary in Maryland, where he was appointed director of spiritual formation in 1998.

Coakley returned to Wichita after he was appointed director of the Spiritual Life Center in 2002. In January 2004, Bishop Michael Owen Jackels named Coakley as vice-chancellor of the diocese. He also served as administrator of the Church of the Magdalen Parish from July to December 2004.

== Bishop of Salina ==
On October 21, 2004, Coakley was appointed the ninth bishop of Salina by Pope John Paul II. He was consecrated on December 28, 2004, at Sacred Heart Cathedral in Salina by Archbishop James P. Keleher, with Bishops George K. Fitzsimons and Gerber serving as co-consecrators. He selected as his episcopal motto Duc in altum, meaning 'Put out into the deep' (Luke 5:4)

Within the United States Conference of Catholic Bishops (USCCB), Coakley sat on the Subcommittee on Home Missions; Committee on Clergy, Consecrated Life and Vocations; and Committee on Evangelization and Catechesis. He is also a fourth degree Knight of Columbus, and a member of the Equestrian Order of the Holy Sepulchre of Jerusalem.

== Archbishop of Oklahoma City ==
On December 16, 2010, Pope Benedict XVI appointed Coakley as Archbishop of Oklahoma City. He was installed on February 11, 2011, replacing retiring Eusebius J. Beltran. After the announcement, Coakley remarked:

"This new pastoral responsibility is an opportunity and a challenge that I certainly had not sought, but one which I will eagerly embrace with all my heart."

In August 2018, Coakley responded to Archbishop Carlo Maria Viganò's letter describing a series of warnings to the Vatican regarding sexual misconduct by Cardinal Theodore McCarrick. Coakley professed to having "the deepest respect for Archbishop Viganó and his personal integrity" and called for an investigation and a "purification" of the Church.

On November 15, 2022, Coakley was elected secretary of the USCCB, the third-highest position in the conference. He defeated Cardinal Joseph W. Tobin in a vote of 130–104, and succeeded Archbishop Timothy Broglio, who had been elected president.

On November 11, 2025, Coakley was elected to succeed Broglio for a three-year term as president of the USCCB. After three rounds of voting, he defeated Bishop Daniel E. Flores in a vote of 128–109; Flores was subsequently elected vice president. Coakley had been viewed as a leading conservative contender for the presidency, as outgoing vice president William E. Lori was ineligible due to his age.

== Catholic Relief Services ==
On November 18, 2013, at the USCCB General Assembly, Coakley was announced as the new chair of the board of Catholic Relief Services (CRS), succeeding Bishop Gerald Kicanas. The international relief and humanitarian agency of the US Catholic Church, CRS operates in about 91 countries, and the board stewards a budget of over $700 million. Coakley had been on the board since 2012, and at the time of his appointment, the agency was in the midst of responding to the impact of Typhoon Haiyan in the Philippines. Coakley described himself as "humbled" and "honored" to chair the 70-year-old organization.

In his first months as chair, Archbishop Coakley undertook visits to Palestine and the Philippines to observe the agency's programs and meet with local staff and beneficiaries.

== Viewpoints ==
Coakley has been described as having socially conservative views by the Associated Press.

=== Abortion ===
During the 2008 U.S. presidential election, Coakley declared,

"To vote for a candidate who supports an intrinsic evil, such as abortion or genocide, would require a proportionately grave moral reason for ignoring such a flaw."

Coakley later stated that House Speaker Nancy Pelosi and Senator Joe Biden "misrepresented Catholic teaching on abortion" in their respective interviews on the TV program Meet the Press.

Calling the victory of President Barack Obama in 2008 an "undeniable irony," Coakley said that the election of the first African-American president "signals that our nation has crossed a threshold in the struggle for civil rights". However, Coakley noted what he termed Obama's "denial of civil rights and legal protection to a whole class of persons as well, unborn human beings."

In March 2009, Coakley described Obama's reversal of the Mexico City Policy and the nomination of Kansas Governor Kathleen Sebelius as Secretary of Health and Human Services as "serious assaults against the rights of conscience and our efforts to protect innocent human life."

=== Capital punishment ===
In September 2023, Coakley condemned the execution of Anthony Sanchez that same month by the State of Oklahoma. Sanchez had raped and murdered a 21-year-old University of Oklahoma student in 1996. Coakley remarked:

"Today the state of Oklahoma has once again delivered what it deems 'justice' with the execution of Anthony Sanchez. No matter how heinous a crime a person commits, they do not forfeit their human dignity bestowed upon them by God, the author of life."

In October 2026, Coakley expressed "shock and great sorrow" from the U.S. Department of War decision to livestream the execution of Nidal Hasan, who was sentenced to death for the 2009 Fort Hood Shooting. Coakley said:

“In no way can Hassan's actions be condoned, but this decision is a barbaric promotion of a culture of death and must be reconsidered. The word of God exhorts us: ‘do not repay anyone evil for evil' (Romans 12:17). The public execution even of one who has done grave harm will only further undermine the moral fabric of our nation and be a blight on the conscience of its people."

=== January 6 attack ===
Following the January 6 United States Capitol attack, Coakley issued a statement on behalf of the USCCB, as chairman of the Committee on Domestic Justice and Human Development. In his statement, he condemned the attack and declared,

"Look at the images of the events on January 6. Look at the messages that accompanied them on social media. Look at the symbols of racial hatred in the crowd. If you supported this, or are considering further actions in the coming week, ask: is what I intend the fruit of the Holy Spirit? Are my intentions expressions of love for others, including those I may consider enemies? Are they reflections of joy? Will they lead to peace? Do they exhibit patience, kindness, gentleness, and self-control? The violence of January 6, and the many voices that urged it on, including some political leaders, were the opposite of these things."

=== LGBTQ+ ===
In 2023, Coakley expressed his approval of Governor Kevin Stitt signing a bill that prohibited hormone therapy and gender reassignment surgery for children under age 18 in Oklahoma. Coakley wrote,

"It is always heart-wrenching to see a child in pain. There aren't quick fixes to gender dysphoria, but through unconditional love, patience, and humility, families can navigate these tough topics."

=== Mass deportation ===
Coakley has criticized the mass deportation efforts during the second presidency of Donald Trump. In a February 2025 statement, he agreed that "renewed efforts should be considered to protect our nation's borders," but declared that deportations were "creating fear and even distress for our immigrant, migrant, and refugee neighbors who have arrived in search of the same dreams that awaited many of our ancestors at a different moment in time." He added that "the majority of undocumented immigrants in Oklahoma are upstanding members of our communities and churches, not violent criminals."

On the day after Coakley's election as USCCB President, the conference issued a special message on immigration that also criticized the Trump administration's deportation efforts. The message, a rare move by the country's Catholic bishops that Coakley strongly supported, stated,

"We oppose the indiscriminate mass deportation of people. We pray for an end to dehumanizing rhetoric and violence, whether directed at immigrants or at law enforcement. We pray that the Lord may guide the leaders of our nation, and we are grateful for past and present opportunities to dialogue with public and elected officials. In this dialogue, we will continue to advocate for meaningful immigration reform."

=== War in Iran ===
In April 2026, Coakley expressed his opposition to the United States' war in Iran, issuing a statement in which he called on President Trump to "step back from the precipice of war and negotiate a just settlement for the sake of peace and before more lives are lost."

== See also ==
- Catholic Church hierarchy
- Catholic Church in the United States
- Historical list of the Catholic bishops of the United States
- List of Catholic bishops of the United States
- Lists of patriarchs, archbishops, and bishops

== Episcopal succession ==
Catholic Church titles
| Preceded by Eusebius J. Beltran | Archbishop of Oklahoma City; 2011–present | Succeeded by Incumbent |
| Preceded by George Kinzie Fitzsimons | Bishop of Salina; 2004–2010 | Succeeded by Edward Weisenburger |
