= Theophile Meerschaert =

Flemish-American Catholic bishop (1847–1924)

The Right Reverend Theophile Meerschaert
- Bishop of Oklahoma
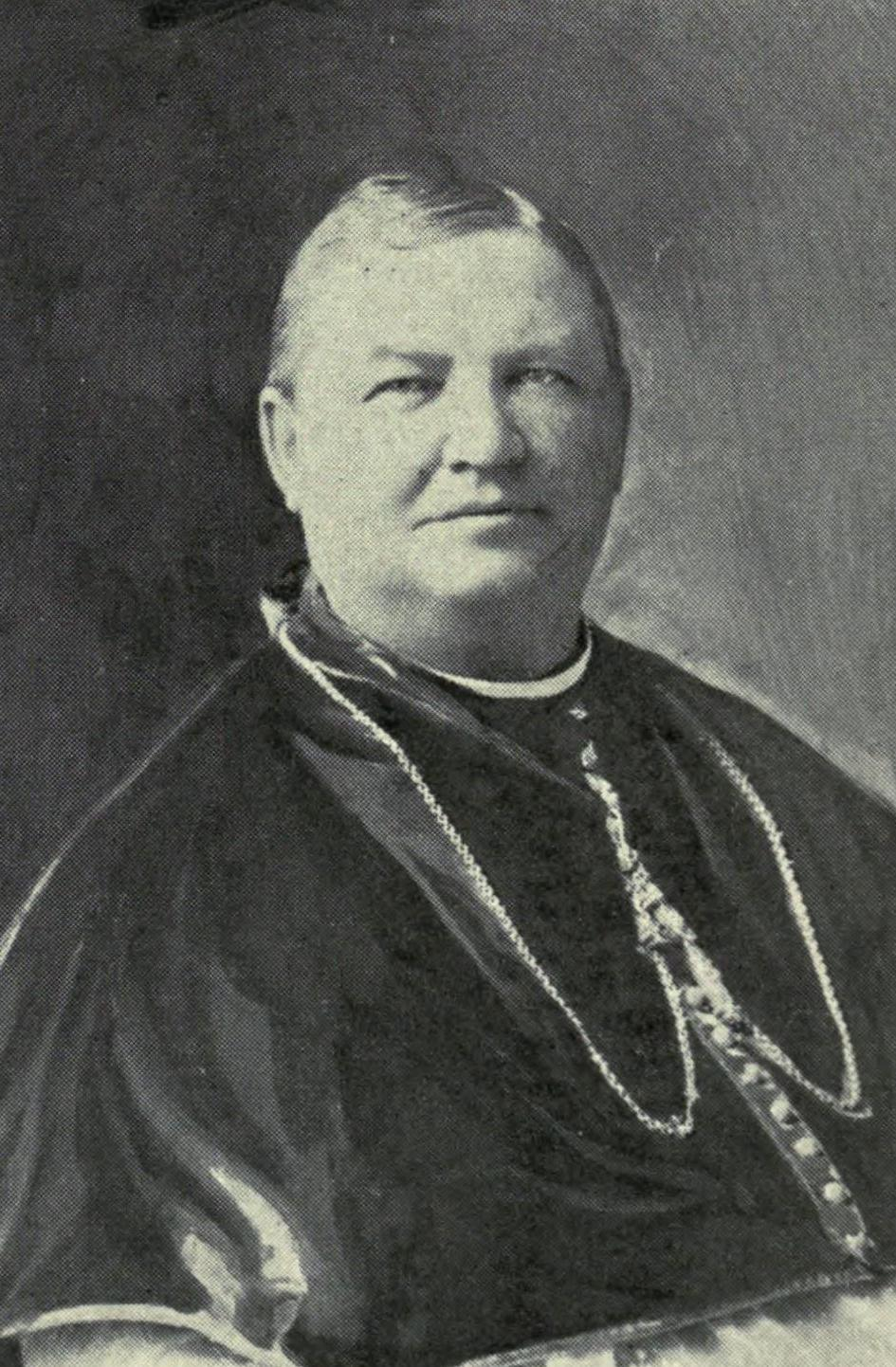
- Church: Catholic Church
- Diocese: Archdiocese of Oklahoma
- In office: 2 June 1891 – 21 February 1924
- Predecessor: Ignatius Jean, O.S.B.
- Successor: Francis Kelley
- Previous posts: Vicar Apostolic of Indian Territory; Titular Bishop of Sidyma

Orders
- Ordination: 23 December 1847 by Charles Andre Anthonis
- Consecration: 8 September 1891 by Francis Janssens

Personal details
- Born: 24 August 1847 Russignies, East Flanders, Belgium
- Died: 21 February 1924 (aged 76) Oklahoma City, Oklahoma, United States
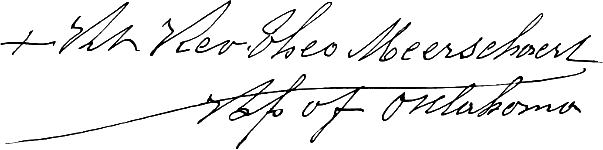
- Signature

Styles of Theophile Meerschaert
- Reference style: The Most Reverend
- Spoken style: Your Excellency
- Religious style: Monsignor
- Posthumous style: none

Theophile Meerschaert (24 August 1847 – 21 February 1924) was a Belgian-born prelate of the Catholic Church. He served as the Bishop of the Diocese of Oklahoma (and its predecessor) in the United States from 1891 until his death in 1924.

== Early life and education ==
Théophile Meerschaert was born on 24 August 1847 in Russignies, a farming village near Renaix, in the province of East Flanders in Belgium. He was the eighth of nine children of the peddler from Renaix, Pierre François Meerschaert, and his wife from Russeignies, Marie Therèse Gabreau. After studying at the College of Renaix (1859–1864) and the College of Audenarde (1864–1868), he entered the American College of Louvain in 1868, having been moved by word of the needs and opportunities in the American missions.

== Ordination and ministry ==
Meerschaert was ordained to the priesthood on 23 December 1871 in Mechelen, Belgium. He left for the United States in September 1872, arriving at Natchez, Mississippi in the following October. For the next 19 years he labored among the difficult circumstances of the Southern Reconstruction. He was appointed to Hancock and Harrison Counties in November 1872, and transferred to Ocean Springs in August 1874. In October 1875, Meerschaert was felled by yellow fever and his case thought hopeless, but he eventually recovered. He worked in Bay St. Louis for a year before returning to Natchez in August 1880. He became vicar general of the Diocese of Natchez on 18 April 1887, and later apostolic administrator (1888–1889) after Bishop Francis Janssens was promoted to Archbishop of New Orleans in 1888. He also served as rector of St. Mary's Cathedral.

== Vicar Apostolic in Oklahoma ==
On 2 June 1891, Meerschaert was appointed Vicar Apostolic of Indian Territory in Oklahoma and Titular Bishop of Sidyma by Pope Leo XIII. He received his episcopal consecration on the following 8 September from Archbishop Janssens, with Bishops Edward Fitzgerald and Thomas Heslin serving as co-consecrators, at St. Mary's Cathedral. En route to his new assignment, he celebrated the first Pontifical High Mass in Oklahoma Territory on 20 September 1891, at Guthrie.

At the time of his arrival, the vicariate had three diocesan priests, 23 Benedictine monks, 21 churches, seven day schools, five Indian boarding schools, one college, one monastery, six convents and about 5,000 Catholics. By the time of his death, the Church in Oklahoma had an elevenfold increase in Catholics, and churches and schools multiplied by some seven and five times respectively. Meerschaert also dedicated about 100 new churches and recruited around a dozen American-born clergy during his tenure.

== Bishop of Oklahoma ==
Meerschaert was named the first Bishop of Oklahoma on 23 August 1905, when Pope Pius X raised the vicariate to the rank of a diocese.

For thirty-two years as the Bishop, Meerschaert kept a detailed diary about his life and career in Oklahoma. It was edited and published as a book seventy years after his death.

Meerschaert died on 21 February 1924 at St. Anthony's Hospital in Oklahoma City, aged 76. Originally buried at Fairlawn Cemetery in Oklahoma City, his remains were transferred to the Bishops' Vault at Resurrection Cemetery, also in Oklahoma City.

== Writings ==
Theophile Meerschaert, author, and James D. White, editor, Diary of a frontier bishop: The journals of Theophile Meerschaert (Tulsa, Oklahoma: Sarto Press, 1994), ISBN 0964170205

== See also ==
- Hierarchy of the Catholic Church
- Historical list of the Catholic bishops of the United States
- List of Catholic bishops in the United States
- Lists of popes, patriarchs, primates, archbishops, and bishops

Catholic Church titles
Preceded by none (diocese erected)	Bishop of Oklahoma; 1905–1924	Succeeded by Francis Kelley
Preceded by Igantius Jean, O.S.B.	Vicar Apostolic of Indian Territory; 1891–1905	Succeeded by none
